= Idol (Swedish TV series) =

Swedish reality television series

- Also known as: Swedish Idol
- Created by: Simon Fuller
- Presented by: Pär Lernström (2011–); Mauri Hermundsson (sidekick, 2024-); Amie Bramme Sey (sidekick, 2023); Anis Don Demina (sidekick, 2021-2022); Gina Dirawi (2017–2019); Kakan Hermansson (sidekick, 2013); Cecilia Forss (sidekick, 2011); Peter Jihde (2007–2010); Carolina Gynning (2007); Carina Berg (2007); Sanna Bråding (2006); Mogge Sseruwagi (2006); Tobbe Blom (2005); Johan Wiman (2005); David Hellenius (2004); Peter Magnusson (2004)
- Judges: Peg Parnevik (2024-); Katia Mosally (2021-); Alexander Kronlund (2017–2023); Fredrik Kempe (2016); Quincy Jones III (2016); Nikki Amini (2016–2020); Alexander Bard (2011–2015); Anders Bagge (2008–2015, 2017–); Laila Bagge (2008–2015); Pelle Lidell (2011); Andreas Carlsson (2008–2010); Daniel Breitholtz (2004–2007); Peter Swartling (2004–2007); Kishti Tomita (2004–2007, 2017–2023); Claes af Geijerstam (2004–2006)
- No. of seasons: 19

Production
- Production locations: Television Studios, Stockholm (2004–2023); Filadelfiakyrkan, Stockholm (2024-); Globen, Stockholm (finale) (2007–2019, 2021, 2023); Tele2 Arena, Stockholm (finale) (2022); Scandinavium, Gothenburg (semi-final) (2009–2011); Malmö Arena, Malmö (quarter-final) (2009–2011)
- Running time: Auditions/performance show 90 minutes, 120 minutes, 60 minutes Elimination show 15 minutes (Both shows include commercials)

Original release
- Network: TV4
- Release: 2 September 2004 – present

Idol is a Swedish reality-competition talent show broadcast on TV4. It was first aired in August 2004, and became one of the most popular shows on Swedish television. Part of the Idols franchise, it originated from the reality program Pop Idol created by British entertainment executive Simon Fuller, which was first aired in 2001 in the United Kingdom.

The program seeks to discover the best singer in Sweden through a series of nationwide auditions. The outcomes of the later stages of the competition are determined by public phone voting. The format features three judges who give critiques of the contestants' performances. Since Idol started in 2004, the show has featured five different line-ups of judges, a total of nine different judges, as well as twelve different presenters (including sidekicks in 2011 and 2013). From 2004 to 2007, each season had two hosts who stayed for just one season. However, since 2008, each season only has one host. For the 2011 season, the eighth season of Idol, Pär Lernström was the host. For the 2013 season, Pär Lernström returned as host and Karin "Kakan" Hermansson as his sidekick.

The winners of the first nine series were Daniel Lindström, Agnes Carlsson, Markus Fagervall, Marie Picasso, Kevin Borg, Erik Grönwall, Jay Smith, Amanda Fondell, and Kevin Walker. Smith is the oldest winner at 29 whilst Fondell and Carlsson are the youngest at only 17. To date, Idol contestants have collectively sold over 1.1 million albums in Sweden alone.

Following the completion of its eighth season, Idol was put on indefinite hiatus alongside Talang and replaced in 2012 by two reality singing competitions: The Voice and X Factor, the latter of which also originated from the United Kingdom's version, created by music executive Simon Cowell. However, in January 2013, TV4 announced that Idol would return in 2013 and that neither The Voice nor X Factor would continue, due to low ratings for both shows.

== Audition cities ==
- Season 1: Karlstad, Gothenburg, Malmö, Umeå, Stockholm
- Season 2: Malmö, Sundsvall, Gothenburg, Piteå, Stockholm
- Season 3: Malmö, Gothenburg, Falun, Umeå, Stockholm
- Season 4: Gothenburg, Skellefteå, Malmö, Borlänge, Stockholm
- Season 5: Gothenburg, Luleå, Karlstad, Lund, Stockholm
- Season 6: Gothenburg, Gävle, Malmö, Umeå, Stockholm
- Season 7: Gothenburg, Karlstad, Malmö, Luleå, Stockholm
- Season 8: Linköping, Gothenburg, Lund, Falun, Stockholm
- Season 9: Stockholm, Linköping, Malmö, Gothenburg, Sundsvall
- Season 10: Malmö, Karlstad, Stockholm, Sundsvall, Gothenburg
- Season 11: Kiruna, Arvidsjaur, Åre, Malmö, Stockholm, Gothenburg, Visby, Växjö, Mjölby, Strömstad, Åmål, Rättvik
- Season 12: Malmö, Östersund, Gothenburg, Skövde, Stockholm

== Season synopses ==
=== Season 1 ===
The first season of Idol debuted in the summer of 2004 and was an instant phenomenon, following in the success of other Idol competitions from around the world. The show's co-hosts were comedians David Hellenius and Peter Magnusson, and the four judges were Sony BMG manager Daniel Breitholtz, record producer Peter Swartling, vocal coach Kishti Tomita and musician Claes af Geijerstam. Towards the end of the final stages of the season, Sony BMG released the album Det Bästa Från Idol 2004 which included covers of some of the songs that the final 11 contestants had sung during the competition. The album became a success and was certified gold in Sweden for sales of 20,000 copies.

Winner Daniel Lindström signed a recording contract with Sony BMG, the label in partnership with the show's management. Immediately after the grand final, Lindström released the coronation song "Coming True" which debuted at number 1 on the Swedish singles chart, held the top spot for seven weeks and was certified double platinum. His self-titled debut album Daniel Lindström was released in early December and this too hit number 1. It went on to be certified Platinum, selling over 50,000 copies. His second album Nån slags verklighet was released in August 2006 and peaked at number 3. Recorded completely in his native language, it was less successful than his debut but gained a gold certification. After over two years away from the music industry, Lindström's third album D-Day was released on January 29, 2009. Despite critical acclaim however, the album failed to achieve commercial success, peaking at number 25 and selling less than 5,000 copies.

Runner-up Darin Zanyar also signed a recording contract with Sony BMG and has gone on to enjoy huge success in Sweden, Finland and Germany. His debut album The Anthem was released in February 2005, charted at number 1 and was certified platinum, selling over 50,000 copies in Sweden. The first single "Money For Nothing" was also a huge number 1 hit. His second, self-titled album Darin was released later the same year and surpassed the success of its predecessor, gaining platinum status with sales of almost 80,000 copies and producing Zanyar's second Swedish number 1 single. Break the News was released in late 2006, became his third chart-topping album, was certified gold and gave Zanyar his third number 1 single with "Desire". On December 3, 2008, after almost a two-year break from the music industry, Zanyar's fourth album, Flashback was released. It peaked at number 10, becoming his first not to reach number 1 or gain a certification, despite the huge success of its lead single "Breathing Your Love" featuring Kat DeLuna. In 2009, Zanyar parted ways with Sony BMG and signed a new recording contract with Universal Music. His fifth studio album, LoveKiller was released on August 18, 2010. It debuted at number 2, and reached number 1 in its second week, becoming Zanyar's fourth number 1 album.

Fourth-placer Loreen signed a recording contract with Warner in Sweden shortly after being eliminated from the competition. Loreen returned to the public eye when she took part in the Melodifestivalen 2011 with her song "My Heart is Refusing Me", but failed to represent Sweden in the Eurovision Song Contest 2011. Loreen entered the Melodifastivalen 2012 with her single "Euphoria", written by Thomas G:son and Peter Boström. She won the national final on 10 March with a combined total of 268 points and represented Sweden in the Eurovision Song Contest 2012 held in Baku, Azerbaijan. The song also won the Eurovision Song Contest 2012 with a total of 372 points from 40 voting countries. Loreen received all 12 marks from Austria, Belgium, Denmark, Estonia, Finland, France, Germany, Hungary, Iceland, Ireland, Israel, Latvia, Netherlands, Norway, Russia, Slovakia, Spain and United Kingdom. She also won the Marcel Bezençon Awards for the Artist Award and the Composer Award. After the competition, "Euphoria" received critical acclaim from most music critics, who enjoyed the style of music. Commercially, the song was an instant success, not only in Sweden, but worldwide in Europe and the Oceania. It debuted at number twelve in her home country Sweden, until reaching number one, staying there for six weeks. The song has been certified 5 times Platinum, selling over 100,000 copies in Sweden. In 2023, Loreen returned to Melodifestivalen for a third time. With her song ‘Tattoo’ she won the Swedish ticket to Eurovision for the second time in her career. In Liverpool, UK, Loreen secured her second victory at the Eurovision Song Contest for Sweden. She is the only woman to win the contest twice, and only the second person to do so, following Ireland's Johnny Logan. Tattoo was a streaming and chart success across Europe and the wider world, achieving 400+ million streams to date, and became the fastest Eurovision song to surpass 100 million streams.

=== Season 2 ===
The second season of Idol debuted in the summer of 2005, and carried on the show's huge success. Television personalities Tobbe Blom and Johan Wiman emerged as the new hosts of the show but the judging panel remained the same. As in season one, Sony BMG released a compilation album towards the end of the finals that included cover versions of some of the songs that the final 11 contestants had sung. The album, Idol 2005 - My Own Idol was a huge success, earning double platinum status in Sweden for the sale of 80,000 copies.

Winner Agnes Carlsson signed with Sony BMG and released her coronation song "Right Here, Right Now", which spent six weeks at number 1 and gained double platinum status. Her self-titled debut album Agnes was released in mid-December and held the top spot for two weeks. It was certified platinum in its first week due to enormous sales and has to date sold over 90,000 copies, making it the highest-selling album by an Idol contestant. Less than a year later, in October 2006, Carlsson released her second album, Stronger, which also peaked at number 1, sold over 50,000 copies and was certified platinum. In late 2007, she covered and released the song "All I Want For Christmas Is You" with fellow Idol contestant Måns Zelmerlöw, which peaked at number 3 on the singles chart. Carlsson's departed from Sony BMG in late 2007 and signed a deal with Stockholm-based independent label Roxy Records. Her third studio album Dance Love Pop was released on October 29, 2008, peaked at number 5 and was certified platinum, making Carlsson the first Idol contestant to achieve three platinum albums. It was preceded by the gold-selling single "On and On" which peaked at number 8 for four weeks. Carlsson became the first Idol contestant to receive international recognition when the second single from the album, "Release Me" was launched worldwide during 2009. It reached the top ten in seventeen countries, including the number 1 spot on the US Hot Dance Club Songs chart and sold over 4 million copies worldwide. Carlsson's highly anticipated fourth studio album was expected in the last quarter of 2010 or the first quarter of 2011.

Runner-up Sebastian Karlsson also signed with Sony BMG and his first single "Do What You're Told" peaked at number 1 for four weeks. His self-titled debut album Sebastian was released in March 2006, hit number 1 and gained gold certification, selling over 30,000 copies. His second effort The Vintage Virgin was released a year later in March 2007 and peaked at number two on the Swedish albums chart. It yielded two top 3 singles and was also certified gold for sales exceeding 30,000. Karlsson's third studio album, The Most Beautiful Lie was released on January 29, 2009, but failed to match the success of his previous efforts. The Most Beautiful Lie stalled at number 32 and spent only one week on the Top 60 albums chart.

Third place finisher Sibel Redzep did not initially release any music. Unlike most other previous Idol contestants, she did not sign a recording contract with Sony BMG, but instead chose to sign a deal with Warner Bros. Records. In March 2008, over two years after her appearance on Idol, her debut album, The Diving Belle was finally released. The critically acclaimed album peaked at number 9 for two weeks on the Swedish albums chart and was accredited gold after selling just over 20,000 copies.

Fifth place finisher Måns Zelmerlöw signed with Warner Bros. Records but didn't release his debut single "Cara Mia" until February 2007. The song reached number 1 in Sweden and also gained chart success in Finland, where it peaked at number 4. His first album, Stand By For... was released a month later and it too reached number 1, selling almost 50,000 copies to gain platinum certification. In late 2007, he covered and released the song "All I Want For Christmas Is You" with season two winner Agnes Carlsson, which peaked at number 3. His second album MZW was released on March 25, 2009, and after debuting at number 4, it made a sudden jump from number 26 to number 1 in its ninth week, becoming Zelmerlow's second chart-topping album. It has so far been certified gold with sales in excess of 30,000 copies. Zelmerlow would go onto enter the Melodifestivalen 2015 with the song "Heroes" and would win the competition with 288 points. He went on to the 2015 Eurovision Song Contest in Vienna where he won the competition with a total of 365. He would then host the 2016 Eurovision Song Contest in Stockholm alongside Petra Mede.

Eighth place finisher Ola Svensson signed a record contract with Universal and released his debut album Given To Fly in March 2006. The album peaked at number one, yielded two number one singles and was certified gold. His second album Good Enough came in October 2007 and peaked at number 6. It was re-released in early 2008 under the name Good Enough - the Feelgood Edition and hit a new peak of number 2. The album became more successful than Svensson's debut and provided him with his third number 1 single in "S.O.S". It sold over 35,000 copies and was accredited gold. Scensson's third album is slated for release in 2010, with the preceding singles "Sky's the Limit" and "Unstoppable" both peaking at number 1 in Sweden.

Semifinalist Jim Almgren Gândara became the guitarist of Swedish/American rock band Carolina Liar, signing a contract with Atlantic Records. Their debut album Coming To Terms was released in the US on May 19, 2008, and peaked at number 148 on the Billboard Hot 200. Their debut single "I'm Not Over" peaked at number 3 on the US Rock Chart and their second single "Show Me What I'm Looking For" reached number 69 on the Billboard Hot 100 and number 7 on the Irish Singles Chart.

=== Season 3 ===
The third season of Idol premiered on August 29, 2006, and holds the record for the most successful season launch, with 1.1 million viewers tuning into the first episode. Tobbe Blom and Johan Wiman returned to host once again, but were joined by actress Sanna Bråding and actor Mogge Sseruwagi. 6000 people auditioned for the third season, and the finalists' compilation album, Det Bästa Från Idol 2006, sold over 40,000 copies.

Winner Markus Fagervall signed with Sony BMG and released his coronation song "Everything Changes" immediately after his win. The single held the number 1 spot for seven weeks and was certified double platinum. His debut album Echo Heart was released in mid-December 2006 and was a massive success. Not only did it stay at number 1 for three weeks, it sold over 80,000 copies, and was accredited double platinum. His second album Steal My Melody was released on 15 October 2008 and was much less successful than his debut, peaking at number 11 but selling just over 20,000 copies to go gold.

Runner-up Erik Segerstedt also signed with Sony BMG and released his first album, A Different Shade in February 2007. The album peaked at number 2, gave Segerstedt his a number 1 single and was accredited gold for selling over 25,000 copies. In early 2008 it was announced that Segerstedt had joined with fellow season three contestant Danny Saucedo and season four fifth-place finisher Mattias Andréasson to form the boyband E.M.D. The group have achieved massive success in Sweden, with four consecutive number 1 hit singles. The first, "All for Love" held the number 1 spot for 6 weeks and was certified triple platinum, becoming the highest selling single in Sweden by an Idol contestant. Their debut album, A State of Mind was released in May 2008 and it too hit number 1. It was certified double platinum for sales of over 80,000 copies and spent more weeks on the chart than any other Idol contestant album. The group's second studio album, a compilation of Christmas songs titled Välkommen Hem was released in November 2009 and became the highest-selling album ever by an Idol alumnus after being certified quadruple platinum for the sale of a massive 160,000 copies.

Sixth place finisher Danny Saucedo was signed to Sony BMG music, and his debut album Heart Beats was released in May 2007. The record peaked at number 1, produced two chart-topping singles and was certified gold for the sale of over 30,000 copies. In early 2008, Saucedo formed the boyband E.M.D with fellow season three contestant Erik Segerstedt and season four fifth-place finisher Mattias Andréasson to form the boyband E.M.D. In late 2008, Saucedo released "Radio", the lead single from his second solo album, which became his third number one single. The album, Set Your Body Free was released on Christmas Eve and debuted at number 2. In its second week on the chart however, it fell to number 36 and spent only five weeks on the chart.

=== Season 4 ===
Season four of Idol launched on September 3, 2007, with a brand new hosting team made up of television personalities Peter Jihde, Carolina Gynning and Carina Berg. The series also saw the judging panel reduce to three, with musician Claes af Geijerstam bowing out of the series for personal reasons. Another change from previous seasons was the grand finale venue. For the first time it was moved from the usual television studios to the 16,000-seat Globen Arena in Stockholm. The finale contestants' compilation album Det Bästa Från Idol 2007 was released at the end of November and was certified platinum after selling over 40,000 copies.

Winner Marie Picasso was signed to Sony BMG and her coronation song "This Moment" was released immediately after her victory. The single spent two weeks at number one and was certified platinum. Her debut album The Secret was released in mid-December and held the number 1 spot for three weeks. It sold just over 60,000 copies and was accredited platinum. However, the album failed to yield any other successful singles, with the second and final song released, "Winning Streak" missing the Top 60.

Runner-up Amanda Jenssen also signed a recording contract with Sony BMG and released her debut album Killing My Darlings in May 2008. The album peaked at number 1 on the Swedish albums chart and has since been certified double platinum for the sale of over 80,000 copies. So far she has been more commercially successful than winner Picasso, with all four singles released from Killing My Darlings making it into the top fifteen, including a number 1 with "Do You Love Me?" Jenssen's highly anticipated second album Happyland was released on October 28, 2009. The album debuted at number 3 and has gone on to sell over 60,000 copies, spending more weeks on the official albums chart than her debut.

Fourth place finisher Daniel Karlsson released his first single, "Would You Believe?" in late 2008, which peaked at number 8. His debut album was originally set for release in early 2009 but is yet to appear.

Fifth place finisher Mattias Andréasson joined with season three Idol contestants Erik Segerstedt and Danny Saucedo to form the boyband E.M.D in early 2008.

=== Season 5 ===
Season five of Idol launched on September 3, 2008, with host Peter Jihde returning to the show. The season saw a dramatic line-up change on the juding panel, with all three judges, Daniel Breitholtz, Peter Swartling and Kishti Tomita departing from the show for various personal reasons. They were replaced by Sony BMG manager Laila Bagge, record producer Anders Bagge and songwriter Andreas Carlsson. The change made Idol the first series in the franchise to completely replace its entire judging panel. For the second time, the grand finale was held in Stockholm's Globen, which set a new record for the largest live audience at an Idol finale anywhere in the world, with an estimated crowd of 16,000 people. It also marked only the second time in worldwide Idol history where neither of the final two contestants were born in the host country. Kevin Borg was born in Malta and Alice Svensson was born in Vietnam. The only other Idol contest to have this occur was Greece's Super Idol in 2004.

Winner Kevin Borg was signed to Sony BMG, and his coronation song "With Every Bit of Me" was released immediately as his debut single. Like the previous four winners' singles, Borg's debuted at number 1 on the singles chart. It went on to hold the top spot for five weeks and was certified double platinum. Unlike his four predecessors, who had their first albums released only weeks after their victories, Borg was given longer to record his own debut. The lead single, "Street Lights" was released in late February 2009 and peaked at number 10 on the Swedish singles chart. The album The Beginning followed on March 4 and debuted at number 3. Although it sold over 10,000 copies in its first week of release, The Beginning was the first Idol winner's album not to debut or peak at number 1. It gained a gold certification for sales in excess of 35,000 copies, but is the only debut Idol winner album not to reach platinum status.

Fourth place contestant Johan Palm signed with Epic Records and his debut single "Emma-Lee", released in early April 2009, reached the number 1 spot on the Swedish singles chart in its third week. His first album, My Antidote was released on 22 May 2009 and debuted at number 3. After nine weeks on the chart it was certified gold for sales in excess of 20,000 copies.

Fifth place contestant Anna Bergendahl was signed by Universal Records at the end of 2009, a year after season five of Idols. She was selected to compete in Melodifestivalen 2010, going on to win the contest and represent Sweden in the 2010 Eurovision Song Contest in Oslo, Norway. Her winning song "This Is My Life" debuted at number one on the Swedish singles chart, a position it held for four consecutive weeks. Her debut album, Yours Sincerely was released on April 21, 2010, and also hit the number one spot in its first week, making Bergendahl the only season five Idol contestant to achieve a chart-topping album. The record was certified gold for Swedish sales of over 20,000 copies.

=== Season 6 ===
Season six of Idol premiered on September 8, 2009, with Peter Jihde once again returning to host the show, along with judges Laila Bagge, Anders Bagge and Andreas Carlsson. An Idol record of 11,000 people auditioned for the series, which included an 'audition tour' around Sweden by judge Anders Bagge in order to find talent outside the most densely populated areas. The series marked a new change to the format of the show, whereby the bottom two contestants in each week of the finals were required to sing again. Their previous votes were wiped clean and the public re-cast their votes. The rule was brought in as an attempt to prevent 'shock eliminations' of the more talented contestants, and had already proved successful in other countries. The grand finale was once again held in Stockholm's Globen, with guest performers including season two winner Agnes Carlsson, who in 2009 had become the first Idol alumni to achieve worldwide success.

Winner Erik Grönwall signed with Sony BMG and released his coronation song ""Higher"", which spent five weeks at number one and was certified platinum. Like all previous Idol winners (with the exception of Kevin Borg), his self-titled debut album Erik Grönwall was released only two weeks after his victory, and went into the official Swedish chart at number one, a position it held for four weeks. The album was certified platinum for the sale of over 40,000 copies. His second album, Somewhere Between a Rock and a Hard Place was released in June 2010 and peaked at number two.

Runner-Up Calle Kristiansson also signed a recording contract with Sony BMG and released his self-titled debut album Calle Kristiansson on December 21, 2009. The album debuted at number two, held off the top spot by season six winner Erik Grönwall. The album held the number two spot for a total of four weeks and was accredited gold for sales of over 20,000 copies.

Third placer Tove Styrke released her debut album in November 2010 named Tove Styrke, peaking at number 10 on the Swedish Albums Chart. The second single of the album, White Light Moment, peaked at number 5 on the Swedish Singles Chart and was nominated to the Song of the Year category on 2012 Swedish Grammis Awards.

=== Season 7 ===
Season seven of Idol premiered in September 2010 with Peter Jihde returning as host the show, along with judges Laila Bagge, Anders Bagge and Andreas Carlsson. A new Idol record was set during the April and May auditions, with a total of 11,700 applicants. The series was won by Jay Smith.

=== Season 8 ===
Season eight premiered on TV4 on September 4, 2011, Pär Lernström was the new host of the series, after Peter Jihde declined to return as host after Idol 2010. Judge Andreas Carlsson left and was replaced by Alexander Bard and Pelle Lidell. The series was won by Amanda Fondell.

=== Season 9 ===
In January 2013, TV4 announced that Idol returns in 2013, following a one-year hiatus. Pär Lernström returned as host, and had Karin "Kakan" Hermansson as sidekick. Alexander Bard, Laila Bagge and Anders Bagge returned as judges. Winner of this season was Kevin Walker, a professional footballer who played for GIF Sundsvall at the time.

=== Season 10 ===
After the completion of season 9, TV4 announced a tenth season, Idol 2014, airing in 2014. The season, in addition to the competition, also celebrated the show's 10th anniversary. Alexander Bard, Laila Bagge and Anders Bagge returned as judges from last season. The season's host was Pär Lernström. The winner of the title was Lisa Ajax.

=== Season 11 ===
The eleventh season started airing on 17 August 2015. This was the last season with the current jury of Anders Bagge, Laila Bagge Wahlgren and Alexander Bard. The title was won by Martin Almgren.

=== Season 12 ===
The twelfth season started airing on 12 August 2016. This season there was a new jury made up of Fredrik Kempe, Nikki Amini and Quincy Delight Jones III. The title was won by Liam Cacatian Thomassen.

=== Season 13 ===
The 13th season aired in 2017. The judging panel was made up of Anders Bagge, Nikki Amini, Alexander Kronlund and Kishti Tomita. Title was won by Christoffer Kläfford.

=== Season 14 ===
The 14th season aired in 2018. The judging panel was made up of Anders Bagge, Nikki Amini, Alexander Kronlund and Kishti Tomita. Title was won by Sebastian Walldén.

=== Season 15 ===
The 15th season aired in 2019. The judging panel was made up of Anders Bagge, Nikki Amini, Alexander Kronlund and Kishti Tomita. Title was won by Tousin Michael Chiza (Tusse).

=== Season 16 ===
The 16th season aired in 2020. The judging panel was made up of Anders Bagge, Nikki Amini, Alexander Kronlund and Kishti Tomita. The title was won by Nadja Holm on 4 December 2020. Due to coronavirus, this season was run differently and was filmed without an audience.

=== Season 17 ===
The 17th season aired on 23 August 2021. The judging panel was made up of Anders Bagge, Katia Mosally, Alexander Kronlund and Kishti Tomita. The title was won by Birkir Blær.

=== Season 18 ===
The 18th season aired in 2022. The judging panel was made up of Anders Bagge, Katia Mosally, Alexander Kronlund and Kishti Tomita. The title was won by Nike Sellmar.

=== Season 19 ===
The 19th season aired in 2023. The judging panel was made up of Anders Bagge, Katia Mosally, Alexander Kronlund and Kishti Tomita. New for this season was that four singers would coach the auditinees, those where Hanna Ferm, Chris Kläfford, Pa Modou Badjie and Maxida Märak.

== Season details ==
| Season | Year | Winner | Runner-up |
|---|---|---|---|
| 1 | 2004 | Daniel Lindström | Darin Zanyar |
| 2 | 2005 | Agnes Carlsson | Sebastian Karlsson |
| 3 | 2006 | Markus Fagervall | Erik Segerstedt |
| 4 | 2007 | Marie Picasso | Amanda Jenssen |
| 5 | 2008 | Kevin Borg | Alice Svensson |
| 6 | 2009 | Erik Grönwall | Calle Kristiansson |
| 7 | 2010 | Jay Smith | Minnah Karlsson |
| 8 | 2011 | Amanda Fondell | Robin Stjernberg |
| 9 | 2013 | Kevin Walker | Elin Bergman |
| 10 | 2014 | Lisa Ajax | Mollie Lindén |
| 11 | 2015 | Martin Almgren | Amanda Winberg |
| 12 | 2016 | Liam Cacatian Thomassen | Rebecka Karlsson |
| 13 | 2017 | Christoffer Kläfford | Hanna Ferm |
| 14 | 2018 | Sebastian Walldén | Kadiatou Holm Keita |
| 15 | 2019 | Tusse Chiza | Freddie Liljegren |
| 16 | 2020 | Nadja Holm | Paulina Pancenkov |
| 17 | 2021 | Birkir Blær | Jacqline Mossberg Mounkassa |
| 18 | 2022 | Nike Sellmar | Albin Tingwall |
| 19 | 2023 | Cimberly Wanyonyi | Saga Ludvigsson |
| 20 | 2024 | Margaux Flavet | Joel Nordenberg |
| 21 | 2025 | Tuva Råwall | Love Stenmarck |
| 22 | 2026 | | |

== Top Selling Idol Alumni ==
This list only includes contestants with at least one certified album, and the totals do not include EPs, digital-only albums or pre-Idol recordings.

Swedish Gold, Platinum, and/or Multi-Platinum certifications (Worldwide Sales)

| | Former contestant Total sales | Debut album | Second album | Third album | Fourth album | Fifth album |
|---|---|---|---|---|---|---|
| 1. | Agnes Carlsson (Season 2, Winner); 355,000 | Agnes (December 19, 2005); Columbia; 93,000; 2xPlatinum; Peak: #1 | Stronger (October 11, 2006); Columbia; 52,000; Platinum; Peak: #1 | Dance Love Pop (October 29, 2008); Roxy Records; 200,000; Platinum; Peak: #5 | Veritas (September 5, 2012); Roxy Records; 10,000; N/A; Peak: #3 | |
| 2. | E.M.D (Erik Segerstedt, Mattias Andréasson and Danny Saucedo); 260,000 | A State of Mind (May 14, 2008); Ariola; 90,000; 2xPlatinum; Peak: #1 | Välkommen Hem (November 9, 2009); Ariola; 160,000; 4xPlatinum; Peak: N/A^{1} | Rewind (December 3, 2010); Ariola; 10,000; N/A; Peak: #20 | | |
| 3. | Amanda Jenssen (Season 4, Runner-Up); 203,000 | Killing My Darlings (May 7, 2008); Epic; 84,000; 2xPlatinum; Peak: #1 | Happyland (October 28, 2009); Epic; 94,000; 2xPlatinum; Peak: #3 | Hymns for the Haunted (November 14, 2012); Sony Music Entertainment; 25,000; Gold; Peak: #2 | | |
| 4. | Darin Zanyar (Season 1, Runner-Up); 186,000 | The Anthem (February 14, 2005); RCA; 52,000; Platinum; Peak: #1 | Darin (September 28, 2005); Columbia; 71,000; Platinum; Peak: #1 | Break the News (November 22, 2006); Columbia; 22,000; Gold; Peak: #1 | Flashback (December 3, 2008); Epic; 16,000; N/A; Peak: #10 | LoveKiller (August 18, 2010); Universal; 25,000; Gold; Peak: #1 |
| 5. | Markus Fagervall (Season 3, Winner); 102,000 | Echo Heart (December 18, 2006); RCA; 81,000; 2xPlatinum; Peak: #1 | Steal My Melody (October 15, 2008); RCA; 21,000; Gold; Peak: #11 | | | |
| 6. | Måns Zelmerlöw (Season 2, 5th Place); 83,000 | Stand By For... (March 23, 2007); Warner Records; 48,000; Platinum; Peak: #1 | MZW (March 25, 2009); Warner Records; 35,000; Gold; Peak: #1 | | | |
| 7. | Daniel Lindström (Season 1, Winner); 77,000 | Daniel Lindström (December 9, 2004); RCA; 53,000; Platinum; Peak: #1 | Nån Slags Verklighet (August 16, 2006); RCA; 22,000; Gold; Peak: #3 | D-Day (January 29, 2009); LaLuff; 3,000; N/A; Peak: #25 | | |
| 8. | Sebastian Karlsson (Season 2, Runner-Up); 72,000 | Sebastian (March 1, 2006); RCA; 38,000; Gold; Peak: #1 | The Vintage Virgin (March 7, 2007); RCA; 32,000; Gold; Peak: #2 | The Most Beautiful Lie (January 29, 2009); Roxy Records; 2,000; N/A; Peak: #32 | | |
| 9. | Ola Svensson (Season 2, 8th Place); 71,000 | Given to Fly (May 31, 2006); Universal; 22,000; Gold; Peak: #1 | Good Enough (October 3, 2007); Universal; 37,000; Gold; Peak: #2 | Ola (September 15, 2010); Universal; 12,000; N/A; Peak: #3 | | |
| 10. | Marie Picasso (Season 4, Winner); 62,000 | The Secret (December 19, 2007); RCA; 62,000; Platinum; Peak: #1 | | | | |
| 11. | Erik Grönwall (Season 6, Winner); 53,000 | Erik Grönwall (December 16, 2009); Columbia; 43,000; Platinum; Peak: #1 | Somewhere Between a Rock and a Hard Place (June 2, 2010); Columbia; 10,000; N/A; Peak: #2 | | | |
| 12. | Danny Saucedo (Season 3, 6th Place); 49,000 | Heart Beats (May 30, 2007); Ariola; 32,000; Gold; Peak: #1 | Set Your Body Free (December 24, 2008); Ariola; 17,000; N/A; Peak: #2 | | | |
| 13. | Loreen (Season 1, 4th Place); 40,000 | Heal (October 22, 2012); Warner Records; 40,000; Platinum; Peak: #1 | | | | |
| 13. | Kevin Borg (Season 5, Winner); 37,000 | The Beginning (March 4, 2009); Ariola; 37,000; Gold; Peak: #3 | | | | |
| 14. | Anna Bergendahl (Season 5, 5th Place); 34,000 | Yours Sincerely (April 21, 2010); Universal; 34,000; Gold; Peak: #1 | | | | |
| 15. | Calle Kristiansson (Season 6, Runner-Up); 31,000 | Calle Kristiansson (December 23, 2009); Columbia; 31,000; Gold; Peak: #2 | | | | |
| 16. | Erik Segerstedt (Season 3, Runner-Up); 28,000 | A Different Shade (February 21, 2007); Epic; 28,000; Gold; Peak: #2 | | | | |
| 17. | Johan Palm (Season 5, 4th Place); 27,000 | My Antidote (May 20, 2009); Epic; 27,000; Gold; Peak: #3 | | | | |
| 18. | Sibel Redzep (Season 2, 3rd Place); 21,000 | The Diving Belle (March 12, 2008); Warner Records; 21,000; Gold; Peak: #9 | | | | |

- ^{1} Välkommen Hem by E.M.D was ineligible to chart as it had been sold exclusively by ICA AB retail stores.
