= Idol 2005 (Sweden) =

- Season 2005
- Hosted by: Tobbe Blom; Johan Wiman
- Judges: Daniel Breitholtz; Kishti Tomita; Claes Af Geijerstam; Peter Swartling
- Winner: Agnes Carlsson
- Runner-up: Sebastian Karlsson
- Location: Magasin 7, Stockholm

Release
- Original network: TV4
- Original release: August 2005 – 2 December 2005

Season chronology
- ← Previous; Season 2004 Next → Season 2006

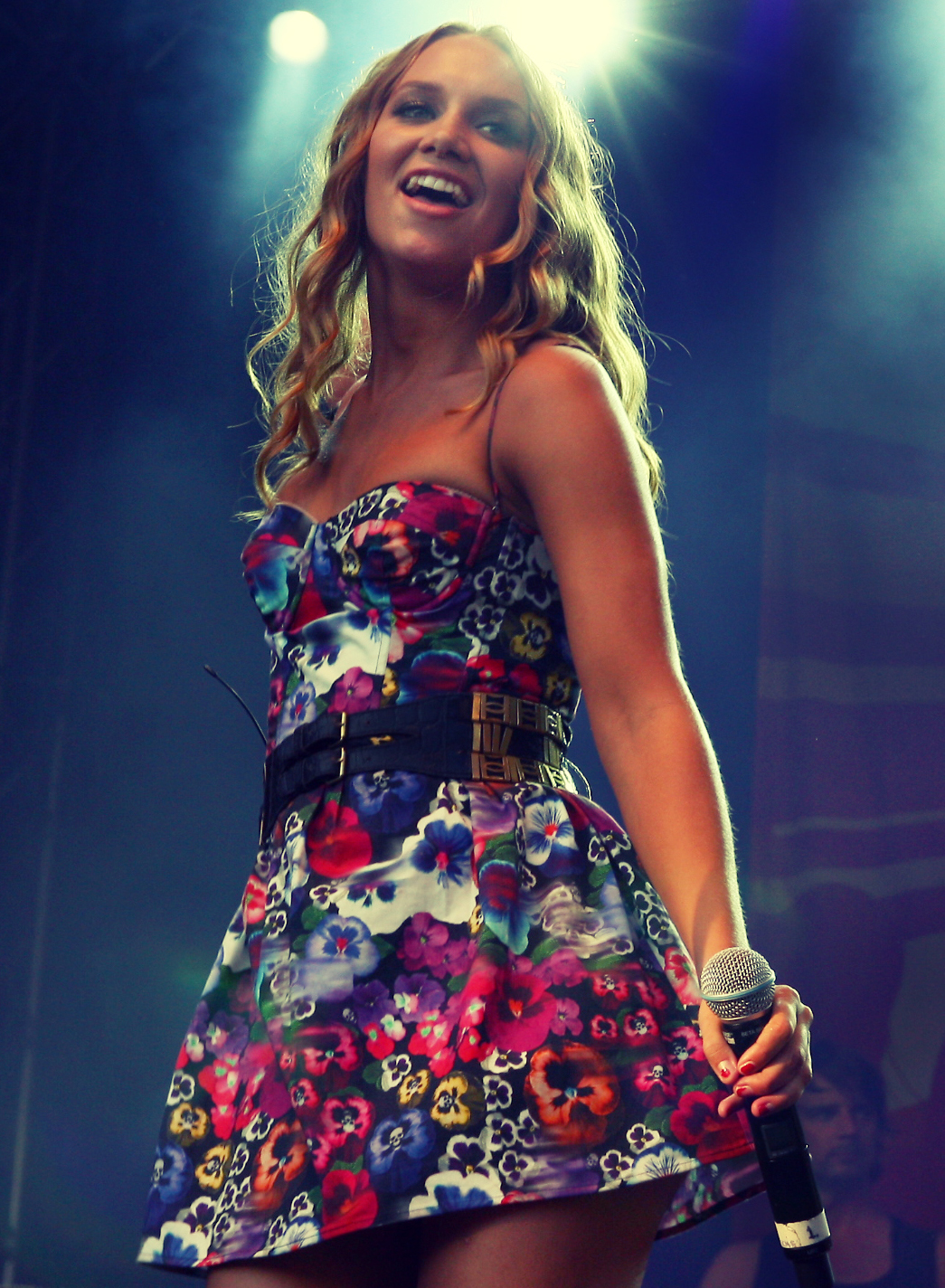

The second season of Swedish Idol ended on 2 December, when 17-year-old Agnes Carlsson from Vänersborg was crowned winner. The series was the first to crown a female Idol and is to date the sole season to be won by either a public or judges' wildcard contestant. Of the over 120 Idol winners worldwide, Carlsson is one of only three who gained a place in the finals as a judges' wildcard. The others are 2003 Canadian Idol winner Ryan Malcolm and 2007 Australian Idol winner Natalie Gauci. Carlsson has since become the most successful recording artist in the show's history.

== Auditions ==
Auditions were held in the Swedish cities of Stockholm, Gothenburg, Malmö, Piteå and Sundsvall during the spring of 2005.

== Finalists ==
(ages stated at time of contest)

| Contestant | Age | Hometown | Voted Off | Liveshow Theme |
|---|---|---|---|---|
| Agnes Carlsson | 17 | Vänersborg | Winner | Grand Finale |
| Sebastian Karlsson | 20 | Morgongåva | 2 December 2005 | Grand Finale |
| Sibel Redžep | 18 | Kristianstad | 25 November 2005 | Judges' Choice |
| Jens Pääjärvi | 17 | Altersbruk | 18 November 2005 | Love Songs |
| Måns Zelmerlöw | 19 | Lund | 11 November 2005 | Rock |
| Elina Nelson | 17 | Torna Hällestad | 4 November 2005 | Cocktail |
| Jonah Hallberg | 24 | Haninge | 28 October 2005 | Disco |
| Ola Svensson | 19 | Lund | 21 October 2005 | Pop Hits |
| Marième Niang | 20 | Farsta | 14 October 2005 | Swedish Hits |
| Maria Albayrak | 18 | Örebro | 7 October 2005 | 80s Hits |
| Cindy Lamréus | 19 | Malmö | 30 September 2005 | My Idol |

== Live show details ==
Two out of eight semi-finalists made it to the live finals each day, based on public phone voting. An additional semi-finalist contestant who had not gained enough public votes was also chosen by the judges to advance to the finals.

=== Heat 1 (19 September 2005) ===
| Order | Artist | Song (original artists) | Result |
|---|---|---|---|
| 1 | Karin Törngren | "Respect" (Aretha Franklin) | Eliminated |
| 2 | Jens Pääjärvi | "Moments" (Westlife) | Eliminated |
| 3 | Cindy Lamréus | "His Eye Is on the Sparrow" (Lauryn Hill & Tanya Blount) | Advanced |
| 4 | Eddie Razaz | "You've Got a Friend" (James Taylor) | Eliminated |
| 5 | Sarah Razzaq | "I Will Remember You" (Sarah McLachlan) | Eliminated |
| 6 | Jonah Hallberg | "Hello" (Lionel Richie) | Advanced |

Notes

- Jonah Hallberg and Cindy Lamréus advanced to the top 11 of the competition. The other 4 contestants were eliminated.
- Jens Pääjärvi and Sarah Razzaq returned for a second chance at the top 11 in the Wildcard Round.

=== Heat 2 (20 September 2005) ===
| Order | Artist | Song (original artists) | Result |
|---|---|---|---|
| 1 | Hilda Eidhagen | "Son of a Preacher Man" (Dusty Springfield) | Eliminated |
| 2 | Jim Almgren Gândara | "Change the World" (Eric Clapton) | Eliminated |
| 3 | Marième Niang | "How Come You Don't Call Me" (Alicia Keys) | Eliminated |
| 4 | Marsha Songcome | "Can't Fight the Moonlight" (LeAnn Rimes) | Eliminated |
| 5 | Måns Zelmerlöw | "Flying Without Wings" (Westlife) | Advanced |
| 6 | Maria Albayrak | "You Had Me" (Joss Stone) | Advanced |

Notes

- Måns Zelmerlöw and Maria Albayrak advanced to the top 11 of the competition. The other 4 contestants were eliminated.
- Marième Niang returned for a second chance at the top 11 in the Wildcard Round.

=== Heat 3 (21 September 2005) ===
| Order | Artist | Song (original artists) | Result |
|---|---|---|---|
| 1 | Ola Svensson | "Show Me Heaven" (Maria McKee) | Advanced |
| 2 | Hanna Nilsson | "Just Like a Pill" (Pink) | Eliminated |
| 3 | Anton Hård af Segerstad | "You Are Not Alone" (Michael Jackson) | Eliminated |
| 4 | Lina Pålsson | "You'll Be in My Heart" (Phil Collins) | Eliminated |
| 5 | Johan Larsson | "I Love It When We Do" (Ronan Keating) | Eliminated |
| 6 | Sibel Redzep | "The Power of Love" (Jennifer Rush) | Advanced |

Notes

- Sibel Redzep and Ola Svensson advanced to the top 11 of the competition. The other 4 contestants were eliminated.
- Hanna Nilsson and Johan Larsson returned for a second chance at the top 11 in the Wildcard Round.

=== Heat 4 (22 September 2005) ===
| Order | Artist | Song (original artists) | Result |
|---|---|---|---|
| 1 | Agnes Carlsson | "Together Again" (Janet Jackson) | Eliminated |
| 2 | Sebastian Karlsson | "Bad Day" (Daniel Powter) | Advanced |
| 3 | Martina Braun Wolgast | "I Wish" (Stevie Wonder) | Eliminated |
| 4 | Viktor Andersson | "These Are the Days" (Jamie Cullum) | Eliminated |
| 5 | Elina Nelson | "The Voice Within" (Christina Aguilera) | Advanced |
| 6 | James Gamba | "Man in the Mirror" (Michael Jackson) | Eliminated |

Notes

- Sebastian Karlsson and Elina Nelson advanced to the top 11 of the competition. The other 4 contestants were eliminated.
- Agnes Carlsson, Martina Braun Wolgast and James Gamba returned for a second chance at the top 11 in the Wildcard Round.

=== Wildcard round (23 September 2005) ===
| Order | Artist | Song (original artists) | Result |
|---|---|---|---|
| 1 | Sarah Razzaq | "Let's Get It On" (Marvin Gaye) | Eliminated |
| 2 | Johan Larsson | "(Everything I Do) I Do It for You" (Bryan Adams) | Eliminated |
| 3 | Martina Braun Wolgast | "Wish I Didn't Miss You" (Angie Stone) | Eliminated |
| 4 | Agnes Carlsson | "Små rum" (Lisa Nilsson) | Advanced |
| 5 | James Gamba | "I Believe I Can Fly" (R. Kelly) | Eliminated |
| 6 | Hanna Nilsson | "You're the Storm" (The Cardigans) | Eliminated |
| 7 | Marième Niang | "Bridge Over Troubled Water" (Simon & Garfunkel) | Advanced |
| 8 | Jens Pääjärvi | "Angels" (Robbie Williams) | Advanced |

Notes

- The judges selected Agnes Carlsson to move on into the Top 11 of the competition, before the hosts revealed the Top 3 vote getters. Jens Pääjärvi and Marième Niang received the most votes, and completed the Top 11.

=== Live Show 1 (30 September 2005) ===
Theme: My Idol

| Order | Artist | Song (original artists) | Result |
|---|---|---|---|
| 1 | Jens Pääjärvi | "Let Me Entertain You" (Robbie Williams) | Bottom two |
| 2 | Elina Nelson | "Torn" (Natalie Imbruglia) | Safe |
| 3 | Jonah Hallberg | "Hard to Say I'm Sorry" (Chicago) | Safe |
| 4 | Marième Niang | "As" (Stevie Wonder) | Bottom three |
| 5 | Sibel Redzep | "Imagine" (John Lennon) | Safe |
| 6 | Sebastian Karlsson | "It's Only Rock 'n' Roll (But I Like It)" (The Rolling Stones) | Safe |
| 7 | Cindy Lamréus | "A Moment Like This" (Kelly Clarkson) | Eliminated |
| 8 | Maria Albayrak | "Truly, Madly, Deeply" (Savage Garden) | Safe |
| 9 | Ola Svensson | "My All" (Mariah Carey) | Safe |
| 10 | Måns Zelmerlöw | "Millennium" (Robbie Williams) | Safe |
| 11 | Agnes Carlsson | "My Everything" (Jennifer Brown) | Safe |

=== Live Show 2 (7 October 2005) ===
Theme: The 80s

| Order | Artist | Song (original artists) | Result |
|---|---|---|---|
| 1 | Elina Nelson | "Sweet Dreams (Are Made of This)" (Eurythmics) | Safe |
| 2 | Måns Zelmerlöw | "The Look" (Roxette) | Bottom three |
| 3 | Maria Albayrak | "Tell It to My Heart" (Taylor Dayne) | Eliminated |
| 4 | Agnes Carlsson | "I'm So Excited" (The Pointer Sisters) | Safe |
| 5 | Ola Svensson | "True Colors" (Phil Collins) | Safe |
| 6 | Marième Niang | "I Wanna Dance with Somebody (Who Loves Me)" (Whitney Houston) | Bottom two |
| 7 | Jens Pääjärvi | "I Promised Myself" (Nick Kamen) | Safe |
| 8 | Sibel Redzep | "Papa Don't Preach" (Madonna) | Safe |
| 9 | Sebastian Karlsson | "Don't You (Forget About Me)" (Simple Minds) | Safe |
| 10 | Jonah Hallberg | "Sign Your Name" (Terence Trent D'Arby) | Safe |

=== Live Show 3 (14 October 2005) ===
Theme: Swedish Hits

| Order | Artist | Song (original artists) | Result |
|---|---|---|---|
| 1 | Marième Niang | "Oh, vilken härlig dag" (Ted Gärdestad) | Eliminated |
| 2 | Jonah Hallberg | "Magaluf" (Orup) | Safe |
| 3 | Agnes Carlsson | "Himlen runt hörnet" (Lisa Nilsson) | Safe |
| 4 | Sebastian Karlsson | "Musik non stop" (Kent) | Safe |
| 5 | Ola Svensson | "Kom igen, Lena!" (Håkan Hellström) | Safe |
| 6 | Sibel Redzep | "Sista morgonen" (Niklas Strömstedt) | Safe |
| 7 | Måns Zelmerlöw | "Astrologen" (Magnus Uggla) | Safe |
| 8 | Jens Pääjärvi | "Snart tystnar musiken" (Tomas Ledin) | Bottom three |
| 9 | Elina Nelson | "Ängeln i rummet" (Eva Dahlgren) | Bottom two |

=== Live Show 4 (21 October 2005) ===
Theme: Pop

| Order | Artist | Song (original artists) | Result |
|---|---|---|---|
| 1 | Sibel Redzep | "Strong Enough" (Cher) | Safe |
| 2 | Ola Svensson | "Cry Me a River" (Justin Timberlake) | Eliminated |
| 3 | Elina Nelson | "These Words" (Natasha Bedingfield) | Safe |
| 4 | Jens Pääjärvi | "Better Man" (Robbie Williams) | Bottom three |
| 5 | Måns Zelmerlöw | "Escape" (Enrique Iglesias) | Bottom two |
| 6 | Agnes Carlsson | "I'm Outta Love" (Anastacia) | Safe |
| 7 | Jonah Hallberg | "Señorita" (Justin Timberlake) | Safe |
| 8 | Sebastian Karlsson | "It Takes a Fool to Remain Sane" (The Ark) | Safe |

=== Live Show 5 (28 October 2005) ===
Theme: Disco

| Order | Artist | Song (original artists) | Result |
|---|---|---|---|
| 1 | Jonah Hallberg | "Got to Be Real" (Cheryl Lynn) | Eliminated |
| 2 | Agnes Carlsson | "Young Hearts Run Free" (Candi Staton) | Safe |
| 3 | Sebastian Karlsson | "She Works Hard for the Money" (Donna Summer) | Safe |
| 4 | Måns Zelmerlöw | "Relight My Fire" (Dan Hartman) | Safe |
| 5 | Elina Nelson | "I Will Survive" (Gloria Gaynor) | Bottom three |
| 6 | Jens Pääjärvi | "Fantasy" (Earth, Wind & Fire) | Bottom two |
| 7 | Sibel Redzep | "Upside Down" (Diana Ross) | Safe |

=== Live Show 6 (4 November 2005) ===
Theme: Big Band

| Order | Artist | Song (original artists) | Result |
|---|---|---|---|
| 1 | Måns Zelmerlöw | "It's Not Unusual" (Tom Jones) | Safe |
| 2 | Agnes Carlsson | "Can't Take My Eyes Off You" (Frankie Valli) | Safe |
| 3 | Elina Nelson | "What a Wonderful World" (Louis Armstrong) | Eliminated |
| 4 | Sebastian Karlsson | "Quando, quando, quando" (Michael Bublé) | Safe |
| 5 | Sibel Redzep | "I Wanna Be Loved by You" (Marilyn Monroe) | Bottom three |
| 6 | Jens Pääjärvi | "Moondance" (Van Morrison) | Bottom two |

=== Live Show 7 (11 November 2005) ===
Theme: Rock

| Order | Artist | First song (original artists) | Second song | Result |
|---|---|---|---|---|
| 1 | Sebastian Karlsson | "Walk This Way" (Aerosmith) | "Life on Mars" (David Bowie) | Safe |
| 2 | Sibel Redzep | "Since U Been Gone" (Kelly Clarkson) | "Nothing Else Matters" (Metallica) | Safe |
| 3 | Jens Pääjärvi | "You Give Love a Bad Name" (Bon Jovi) | "Stairway to Heaven" (Led Zeppelin) | Bottom two |
| 4 | Agnes Carlsson | "Sk8er Boi" (Avril Lavigne) | "Wonderwall" (Oasis) | Safe |
| 5 | Måns Zelmerlöw | "Beautiful Day" (U2) | "The Reason" (Hoobastank) | Eliminated |

=== Live Show 8 (18 November 2005) ===
Theme: Love Songs

| Order | Artist | First song (original artists) | Second song | Result |
|---|---|---|---|---|
| 1 | Agnes Carlsson | "Heaven" (Bryan Adams) | "The Trouble with Love Is" (Kelly Clarkson) | Safe |
| 2 | Sebastian Karlsson | "With or Without You" (U2) | "You're Beautiful" (James Blunt) | Safe |
| 3 | Sibel Redzep | "All by Myself" (Celine Dion) | "Hero" (Mariah Carey) | Safe |
| 4 | Jens Pääjärvi | "Your Song" (Elton John) | "You Are Not Alone" (Michael Jackson) | Eliminated |

| Order | Artists | Song (original artists) |
|---|---|---|
| 1 | Jens Pääjärvi & Sibel Redzep | "Endless Love" (Lionel Richie & Diana Ross) |
| 2 | Agnes Carlsson & Sebastian Karlsson | "Tears Never Dry" (Lisa Nilsson & Stephen Simmonds) |

=== Live Show 9: Semi-final (25 November 2005) ===
Theme: Judge's Choice

| Order | Artist | First song (original artists) | Second song | Result |
|---|---|---|---|---|
| 1 | Sebastian Karlsson | "Start Me Up" (The Rolling Stones) | "Nothing Compares 2 U" (Sinéad O'Connor) | Safe |
| 2 | Sibel Redzep | "Stop!" (Sam Brown) | "How You Remind Me" (Nickelback) | Eliminated |
| 3 | Agnes Carlsson | "Beautiful" (Christina Aguilera) | "Flashdance... What a Feeling" (Irene Cara) | Safe |

=== Live final (2 December 2005) ===
| Order | Artist | First song | Second song (original artists) | Third song | Result |
|---|---|---|---|---|---|
| 1 | Agnes Carlsson | "This Is It" | "My Everything" | "Right Here, Right Now (My Heart Belongs to You)" | Winner |
| 2 | Sebastian Karlsson | "Born to Run" | "Life on Mars" | "Right Here, Right Now (My Heart Belongs to You)" | Runner-up |

== Elimination chart ==
| Stages: | | Semi-Finals | | | | WC | Finals | | | | | | | | | |
| Weeks: | | 09/19 | 09/20 | 09/21 | 09/22 | 09/23 | 09/30 | 10/7 | 10/14 | 10/21 | 10/28 | 11/4 | 11/11 | 11/18 | 11/25 | 12/2 |
| Place | Contestant | Result | | | | | | | | | | | | | | |
| 1 | Agnes Carlsson | | | | Elim | JC | | | | | | | | | | Winner |
| 2 | Sebastian Karlsson | | | | 1st | | | | | | | | | | | Runner-up |
| 3 | Sibel Redzep | | | 1st | | | | | | | | Btm 3 | | | Elim | |
| 4 | Jens Pääjärvi | Elim | | | | 1st | Btm 2 | | Btm 3 | Btm 3 | Btm 2 | Btm 2 | Btm 2 | Elim | | |
| 5 | Måns Zelmerlöw | | 1st | | | | | Btm 3 | | Btm 2 | | | Elim | | | |
| 6 | Elina Nelson | | | | 2nd | | | | Btm 2 | | Btm 3 | Elim | | | | |
| 7 | Jonah Hallberg | 1st | | | | | | | | | Elim | | | | | |
| 8 | Ola Svensson | | | 2nd | | | | | | Elim | | | | | | |
| 9 | Marième Niang | | Elim | | | 2nd | Btm 3 | Btm 2 | Elim | | | | | | | |
| 10 | Maria Albayrak | | 2nd | | | | | Elim | | | | | | | | |
| 11 | Cindy Lamréus | 2nd | | | | | Elim | | | | | | | | | |
| Wild; Card | James Gamba | | | | Elim | Elim | | | | | | | | | | |
| Wild; Card | Martina B. Wolgast | | | | Elim | Elim | | | | | | | | | | |
| Wild; Card | Hanna Nilsson | | | Elim | | Elim | | | | | | | | | | |
| Wild; Card | Johan Larsson | | | Elim | | Elim | | | | | | | | | | |
| Wild; Card | Sarah Razzaq | Elim | | | | Elim | | | | | | | | | | |
| Semi | Viktor Andersson | | | | Elim | | | | | | | | | | | |
| Semi | Anton H. a. Segerstad | | | Elim | | | | | | | | | | | | |
| Semi | Lina Pålsson | | | Elim | | | | | | | | | | | | |
| Semi | Hilda Eidhagen | | Elim | | | | | | | | | | | | | |
| Semi | Jim A. Gândara | | Elim | | | | | | | | | | | | | |
| Semi | Marsha Songcome | | Elim | | | | | | | | | | | | | |
| Semi | Eddie Razaz | Elim | | | | | | | | | | | | | | |
| Semi | Karin Törngren | Elim | | | | | | | | | | | | | | |

Legend
| Women | Men | Top 11 | Eliminated | Safe | not performed |
