= Idol 2004 (Sweden) =

- Season 2004
- Hosted by: David Hellenius; Peter Magnusson
- Judges: Daniel Breitholtz; Kishti Tomita; Claes Af Geijerstam; Peter Swartling
- Winner: Daniel Lindström
- Runner-up: Darin Zanyar

Release
- Original network: TV4
- Original release: August 2004 – 26 November 2004

Season chronology
- Next → Season 2005

The first season of Sweden's Idol premiered in August 2004 and continued until its grand finale on 26 November, when 26-year-old Daniel Lindström from Umeå was crowned winner.

== Auditions ==
Auditions were held in the Swedish cities of Stockholm, Gothenburg, Malmö, Umeå and Karlstad during the spring of 2004.

== Finals ==
=== Finalists ===
(ages stated at time of contest)

Contestant	Age	Hometown	Voted Off	Liveshow Theme
Daniel Lindström	26	Umeå	Winner	Grand Finale
Darin Zanyar	17	Vällingby	26 November 2004	Grand Finale
Fillip Williams	20	Alingsås	24 September 2004; 19 November 2004	My Idol; Judges' Choice
Lorén Talhaoui	20	Västerås	12 November 2004	My Birth Year
Stina Joelsson	20	Lessebo	5 November 2004	Film Songs
Geraldo Sandell	16	Alingsås	29 October 2004	Cocktail
Paul Lötberg	21	Katrineholm	22 October 2004	Max Martin
Nathalie Schmeikal	19	Gothenburg	15 October 2004	Swedish Hits
Cornelia Dahlgren	26	Stockholm	8 October 2004	Soul
Alex Falk	24	Stockholm	1 October 2004	Billboard Number Ones
Angel Hansson	22	Helsingborg	Withdrew	My Idol

=== Live Show Details ===
Two out of eight semi-finalists made it to the live finals each day, based on public phone voting. An additional semi-finalist contestant who had not gained enough public votes was also chosen by the judges to advance to the finals.

==== Heat 1 (12 September 2004) ====
Artist	Song (original artists)	Result
Diana Tillström	"Run Baby Run" ()	Eliminated
Mikael Landby	"If You're Not the One" (Daniel Bedingfield)	Eliminated
Ninos Yakoub	"Here Without You" (3 Doors Down)	Eliminated
Angelique Nordvall	"Paradise" ()	Eliminated
Geraldo Sandell	"Flying Without Wings" (Westlife)	Advanced
Cornelia Dahlgren	"New World" (Björk)	Advanced
Nina Svensson	"For Once in My Life" (Stevie Wonder)	Eliminated
Sibel Redzep	"Vision of Love" (Mariah Carey)	Eliminated

==== Heat 2 (13 September 2004) ====
Artist	Song (original artists)	Result
Kerima Holm	"Fallin'" (Alicia Keys)	Eliminated
Simon Norrsveden	"Big Sur" (The Thrills)	Eliminated
Alex Falk	"What's Going On" (Marvin Gaye)	Advanced
Sara Holmström	"I Wanna Dance with Somebody (Who Loves Me)" (Whitney Houston)	Eliminated
Elisabeth Dittrich	"Lost Without You" (Delta Goodrem)	Eliminated
Darin Zanyar	"Beautiful" (Christina Aguilera)	Advanced
Liza Gustafsson	"Impossible" (Christina Aguilera)	Eliminated
Emelie Carsten	"Hero" (Mariah Carey)	Eliminated

==== Heat 3 (14 September 2004) ====
Artist	Song (original artists)	Result
Mikael Kärnberg	"I Swear" (All-4-One)	Eliminated
Linda Kjellén	"A Thousand Miles" (Vanessa Carlton)	Eliminated
Johan Thulin	"I Can't Make You Love Me" (George Michael)	Eliminated
Stina Joelsson	"The Greatest Love of All" (Whitney Houston)	Advanced
Emma Christensen	"Proud Mary" (Ike & Tina Turner)	Eliminated
Nathalie Schmeikal	"A Song for Mama" (Boyz II Men)	Advanced
Sam Hagberth	"When a Man Loves a Woman" (Percy Sledge)	Eliminated
Lorén Talhaoui	"Love Is On the Way" (Celine Dion)	Eliminated

==== Heat 4 (15 September 2004) ====
Artist	Song (original artists)	Result
Sanna Lund	"Hand in My Pocket" (Alanis Morissette)	Eliminated
Paul Lötberg	"Bridge over Troubled Water" (Simon & Garfunkel)	Advanced
Matilda Adolfsson	"Heaven" (Bryan Adams)	Eliminated
Viktor Andersson	"Kiss from a Rose" (Seal)	Eliminated
Linus Bornlöf	"Home" (Brian McKnight)	Eliminated
Maria Jonsson	"How Am I Supposed to Live Without You" (Laura Branigan)	Eliminated
Linda Luspa	"I Surrender" (Celine Dion)	Eliminated
Fillip Williams	"Over My Shoulder" (Mike + The Mechanics)	Advanced

==== Heat 5 (16 September 2004) ====
Artist	Song (original artists)	Result
Emelie Fjällström	"Not That Kind" (Anastacia)	Eliminated
Ellinor Asp	"Ain't No Sunshine" (Bill Withers)	Eliminated
Sebastian Normark	"Anytime" (Brian McKnight)	Eliminated
Lisa Modin	"(You Make Me Feel Like) A Natural Woman" (Aretha Franklin)	Eliminated
Angel Hansson	"Can't Take My Eyes Off You" (Frankie Valli)	Advanced
Sara Falkevik	"Your Song" (Elton John)	Eliminated
Frida Karlsson	"The Winner Takes It All" (ABBA)	Eliminated
Daniel Lindström	"Lately" (Stevie Wonder)	Advanced

==== Live Show 1 (24 September 2004) ====
Theme: My Idol

Artist	Song (original artists)	Result
Alex Falk	"Celebration" (Kool & The Gang)	Bottom two
Cornelia Dahlgren	"What It Feels Like for a Girl" (Madonna)	Safe
Fillip Williams	"This Love" (Maroon 5)	Eliminated
Angel Hansson	"Hello" (Lionel Richie)	Bottom three
Nathalie Schemikal	"Total Eclipse of the Heart" (Bonnie Tyler)	Safe
Paul Lötberg	"She's So High" (Tal Bachman)	Safe
Lorén Talhaoui	"If I Ain't Got You" (Alicia Keys)	Safe
Geraldo Sandell	"I Believe I Can Fly" (R. Kelly)	Safe
Stina Joelsson	"Torn" (Natalie Imbruglia)	Safe
Daniel Lindström	"Fastlove" (George Michael)	Safe
Darin Zanyar	"It's Gonna Be Me" (*NSYNC)	Safe

==== Live Show 2 (1 October 2004) ====
Theme: Billboard Number Ones

Artist	Song (original artists)	Result
Angel Hansson	N/A	Withdrew
Paul Lötberg	"MMMBop" (Hanson)	Safe
Geraldo Sandell	"Feel" (Robbie Williams)	Bottom two
Stina Joelsson	"If You Had My Love" (Jennifer Lopez)	Safe
Alex Falk	"Pride (In the Name of Love)" (U2)	Eliminated
Darin Zanyar	"Un-Break My Heart" (Toni Braxton)	Safe
Cornelia Dahlgren	"Don't Speak" (No Doubt)	Safe
Daniel Lindström	"Crazy" (Seal)	Safe
Nathalie Schmeikal	"Black or White" (Michael Jackson)	Safe
Fillip Williams	"Hero" (Enrique Iglesias)	Safe
Lorén Talhaoui	"Just Like a Pill" (Pink)	Bottom three

==== Live Show 3 (8 October 2004) ====
Theme: Soul

Artist	Song (original artists)	Result
Cornelia Dahlgren	"Blame It on the Boogie" (The Jackson 5)	Eliminated
Fillip Williams	"My Girl" (The Temptations)	Bottom three
Lorén Talhaoui	"I Wish" (Stevie Wonder)	Safe
Daniel Lindström	"If You Don't Know Me by Now" (Harold Melvin and the Blue Notes)	Safe
Paul Lötberg	"The Way You Make Me Feel" (Michael Jackson)	Safe
Geraldo Sandell	"I Want You Back" (The Jackson 5)	Safe
Stina Joelsson	"Sexual Healing" (Marvin Gaye)	Safe
Darin Zanyar	"Stand by Me" (Ben E. King)	Safe
Nathalie Schmeikal	"Easy" (The Commodores)	Bottom two

==== Live Show 4 (15 October 2004) ====
Theme: Swedish Hits

Artist	Song (original artists)	Result
Nathalie Schmeikal	"Varje gång jag ser dig" (Lisa Nilsson)	Eliminated
Darin Zanyar	"När vi två blir en" (Gyllene Tider)	Safe
Stina Joelsson	"Ska vi gå hem till dig" (Lasse Tennander)	Safe
Lorén Talhaoui	"Vill ha dig" (Freestyle)	Safe
Paul Lötberg	"Hos dig är jag underbar" (Patrik Isaksson)	Safe
Fillip Williams	"Under ytan" (Uno Svenningsson)	Bottom three
Geraldo Sandell	"Du får göra som du vill" (Patrik Isaksson)	Bottom two
Daniel Lindström	"Sarah" (Mauro Scocco)	Safe

==== Live Show 5 (22 October 2004) ====
Theme: Max Martin

Artist	Song (original artists)	Result
Daniel Lindström	"That's the Way It Is" (Celine Dion)	Safe
Paul Lötberg	"Quit Playing Games (with My Heart)" (Backstreet Boys)	Eliminated
Geraldo Sandell	"As Long as You Love Me" (Backstreet Boys)	Bottom two
Darin Zanyar	"Show Me the Meaning of Being Lonely" (Backstreet Boys)	Safe
Lorén Talhaoui	"Stronger" (Britney Spears)	Safe
Fillip Williams	"I Want It That Way" (Backstreet Boys)	Bottom three
Stina Joelsson	"Oops!... I Did It Again" (Britney Spears)	Safe

==== Live Show 6 (29 October 2004) ====
Theme: Cocktail

Artist	Song (original artists)	Result
Darin Zanyar	"When I Fall in Love" (Nat King Cole)	Bottom three
Fillip Williams	"Ain't That a Kick in the Head?" (Dean Martin)	Safe
Stina Joelsson	"Fever" (Peggy Lee)	Bottom two
Daniel Lindström	"Fly Me to the Moon" (Frank Sinatra)	Safe
Geraldo Sandell	"Unforgettable" (Nat King Cole)	Eliminated
Lorén Talhaoui	"(Where Do I Begin?) Love Story" (Shirley Bassey)	Safe

==== Live Show 7 (5 November 2004) ====
Theme: Movie Soundtracks

Artist	Song (original artists)	Result
Fillip Williams	"Against All Odds (Take a Look at Me Now)" (Phil Collins)	Safe
Lorén Talhaoui	"(I've Had) The Time of My Life" (Bill Medley & Jennifer Warnes)	Bottom two
Stina Joelsson	"Eye of the Tiger" (Survivor)	Eliminated
Darin Zanyar	"I Don't Want to Miss a Thing" (Aerosmith)	Safe
Daniel Lindström	"Licence to Kill" (Gladys Knight)	Safe

==== Live Show 8 (12 November 2004) ====
Theme: My Birth Year

Artist	First song (original artists)	Second song	Result
Daniel Lindström	"September" (Earth, Wind & Fire)	"Just the Way You Are" (Billy Joel)	Safe
Lorén Talhaoui	"Every Breath You Take" (The Police)	"Thriller" (Michael Jackson)	Eliminated
Fillip Williams	"Purple Rain" (Prince)	"Careless Whisper" (George Michael)	Bottom two
Darin Zanyar	"Didn't We Almost Have It All" (Whitney Houston)	"Bad" (Michael Jackson)	Safe

==== Live Show 9: Semi-final (19 November 2004) ====
Theme: Judges' Choice

Artist	First song (original artists)	Second song	Result
Darin Zanyar	"Paradise City" (Guns N' Roses)	"Show Me Heaven" (Maria McKee)	Safe
Fillip Williams	"Rock DJ" (Robbie Williams)	"Always on the Run" (Lenny Kravitz)	Eliminated
Daniel Lindström	"Lately" (Stevie Wonder)	"Glorious" (Andreas Johnson)	Safe

==== Live final (26 November 2004) ====
Artist	First song	Second song	Third song	Result
Darin Zanyar	"Coming True"	"(You Drive Me) Crazy"	"Bad"	Runner-up
Daniel Lindström	"Coming True"	"Virtual Insanity"	"Sarah"	Winner

== Elimination chart ==
Stages:		Semi-Finals					WC (Note: No Wildcard show was held. The judges chose Lorén among the top 4 vote getters from each semifinal in the week before the first live final show was held.)	Finals									
Weeks:		09/13	09/14	09/15	09/16	09/17	WC	09/23	10/1	10/8	10/15	10/22	10/29	11/5	11/12	11/19	11/26
Place	Contestant	Result															
1	Daniel Lindström					1st											Winner
2	Darin Zanyar		1st										Btm 3				Runner-up
3	Fillip Williams				2nd			Elim (Note: Angel J. Hansson withdrew from the competition between weeks 1 and 2 of the finals. He was in the bottom 3 but first saved on 09/23. As a result, eliminated contestant Fillip Williams was re-instated.)		Btm 3	Btm 3	Btm 3			Btm 2	Elim	
4	Lorén Talhaoui			Elim			JC		Btm 3					Btm 2	Elim		
5	Stina Joelsson			1st									Btm 2	Elim			
6	Geraldo Sandell	2nd							Btm 2		Btm 2	Btm 2	Elim				
7	Paul Lötberg				1st							Elim					
8	Nathalie Schmeikal			2nd						Btm 2	Elim						
9	Cornelia Dahlgren	1st								Elim							
10	Alex Falk		2nd					Btm 2	Elim								
11	Angel Hansson					2nd		WD									
Wild; Card	Emelie Fjällström					Elim	Elim										
Wild; Card	Frida Karlsson					Elim	Elim										
Wild; Card	Linda Luspa				Elim		Elim										
Wild; Card	Sanna Lund				Elim		Elim										
Wild; Card	Sam Hagberth			Elim			Elim										
Wild; Card	Emelie Carsten		Elim				Elim										
Wild; Card	Simon Norrsveden		Elim				Elim										
Wild; Card	Ninos Yakub	Elim					Elim										
Wild; Card	Sibel Redzep	Elim					Elim										
Semi Final 5	Ellinor Asp					Elim											
Semi Final 5	Lisa Modin					Elim											
Semi Final 5	Sara Falkevik					Elim											
Semi Final 5	Sebastian Normark					Elim											
Semi Final 4	Linus Bornlöf				Elim												
Semi Final 4	Maria Jonsson				Elim												
Semi Final 4	Matilda Adolfsson				Elim												
Semi Final 4	Viktor Andersson				Elim												
Semi Final 3	Emma Christensen			Elim													
Semi Final 3	Johan Thulin			Elim													
Semi Final 3	Linda Kjellén			Elim													
Semi Final 3	Mikael Kärnberg			Elim													
Semi Final 2	Elisabeth Dittrich		Elim														
Semi Final 2	Kerima Holm		Elim														
Semi Final 2	Liza Gustafsson		Elim														
Semi Final 2	Sara Holmström		Elim														
Semi Final 1	Angelique Nordvall	Elim															
Semi Final 1	Diana Tillström	Elim															
Semi Final 1	Mikael Landby	Elim															
Semi Final 1	Nina Svensson	Elim															
Place	Contestant	Result															
Weeks:		09/13	09/14	09/15	09/16	09/17	WC	09/23	10/1	10/8	10/15	10/22	10/29	11/5	11/12	11/19	11/26
Stages:		Semi-Finals					WC	Finals									

Legend
Women	Men	Top 11	Eliminated	Withdrew	Safe	not performed
