= Idol 2016 (Sweden) =

- Season 2016
- Hosted by: Pär Lernström
- Judges: Fredrik Kempe; Nikki Amini; Quincy Delight Jones III
- Winner: Liam Cacatian Thomassen
- Runner-up: Rebecka Karlsson

Release
- Original network: TV4
- Original release: 22 August – 9 December 2016

Season chronology
- ← Previous; Season 2015 Next → Season 2017

Idol 2016 is the twelfth season of the Swedish Idol series. This is the first year with a new jury consisting of Fredrik Kempe, Nikki Amini and Quincy Delight Jones III. Presenter of the show is as previous Pär Lernström. The show is broadcast on TV4.

== Elimination chart ==
Stage:		Semi Finals						Finals										
Date:		14/9	15/9	16/9	17/9	18/9		30/9	7/10	14/10	21/10	28/10	4/11	11/11	18/11	25/11^{1}	2/12	9/12
Place	Competitor	Results																
1	Liam Cacatian Thomassen				3:a	WC 1												Winner
2	Rebecka Karlsson																	Runner-Up
3	Charlie Grönvall																	3rd Place
4	Oskar Häggström																Out.	
5	Jesper Petersson		3:a			WC 5									Out.			
6	Renaida Braun													Out.				
7	Greg G Curtis												Out.					
8	Nicole Touma											Out.						
9	Adrian Johansson		3:a			WC 4					Out.							
10	Feliks Parik				3:a	WC 2				Out.								
11	Cameron Jai								Out.									
12	Zeana Muratovic							Out.										
13	Norea Sandberg					WC 3	Out.											
Semi	Daniel Poopuu				3:a	Out.												
Semi	Frida Kropp Lindh			3:a		Out.												
Semi	Mabel Zewdie			3:a		Out.												
Semi	Victoria Björling			3:a		Out.												
Semi	Gabriel Danielsson		3:a			Out.												
Semi	Hanna Löwenborg	3:a				Out.												
Semi	Julie Yu	3:a				Out.												
Semi	Saga Brännlund	3:a				Out.												

Legend
Top 12	Top 21	Wildcard	Bottom 2	Eliminated	Withdrew	Safe	Not participated

^{1} All four acts Liam, Charlie, Oskar and Rebecka were declared Safe and progressed to the Semi Final
