= Idol 2006 (Sweden) =

- Season 2006
- Hosted by: Sanna Bråding; Mogge Sseruwagi
- Judges: Daniel Breitholtz; Kishti Tomita; Claes Af Geijerstam; Peter Swartling
- Winner: Markus Fagervall
- Runner-up: Erik Segerstedt

Release
- Original network: TV4
- Original release: August 29 – December 1, 2006

Season chronology
- ← Previous; Season 2005 Next → Season 2007

The third season of Idol premiered in Sweden on August 29, 2006, and continued until its grand finale on December 1, when 24-year-old Markus Fagervall from Övertorneå was crowned winner. The series gained a record-breaking 1.1 million viewers during its first episode, and was the last season to feature Claes af Geijerstam as a judge, who left the series citing financial issues.

== Judges ==
- Daniel Breitholtz – Sony BMG manager
- Peter Swartling – record producer
- Kishti Tomita – vocal coach
- Claes af Geijerstam – musician

== Hosts ==
- Sanna Bråding
- Mogge Sseruwagi

== Auditions ==
- Malmö: April 6, 2006
- Gothenburg: April 22, 2006
- Falun: April 30, 2006
- Umeå: May 6, 2006
- Stockholm: May 13, 2006

More than 6000 people auditioned.

== Top 11 finalists ==
- Cissi Ramsby, 20, Järvsö | Audition song: "Ain't No Sunshine"
- Danny Saucedo, 20, Stockholm | Audition song: "I Swear"
- Erik Segerstedt, 23, Uddevalla | Audition song: "Feeling Good"
- Felicia Brandström, 19, Floda | Audition song: "Dreams Come True"
- Jessica Myrberg, 22, Gothenburg | Audition song: "Because Of You"
- Johan Larsson, 18, Vänersborg | Audition song: "Show Me Heaven"
- Jonas Snäckmark, 20, Halmstad | Audition song: "You Raise Me Up"
- Linda Seppänen, 21, Tungelsta | Audition song: "Sick Of It All"
- Markus Fagervall, 24, Övertorneå | Audition song: "Red"
- Natalie Kadric, 21, Bålsta | Audition song: "Hot Stuff"
- Sara Burnett, 19, Karlstad | Audition song: "I Know What Love Is"

== Semi-final qualifyings ==
Top 20
Format: Two out of five semi-finalists made it to the live finals each day (competing in gender-divided groups), based on public phone voting. Two additional semi-final contestants who had not initially gained enough votes were also chosen by the public to advance to the finals, along with a wildcard chosen by the judges.

Date	First	Second
September 18	Linda Seppänen	Jessica Myrberg
September 19	Markus Fagervall	Danny Saucedo
September 20	Sara Burnett	Felicia Brandström
September 21	Johan Larsson	Jonas Snäckmark
September 22 (Public Wildcards)	Cissi Ramsby	Erik Segerstedt
Judges' Wildcard	Natalie Kadric

== Finals elimination chart ==
Date	Theme	Bottom three
September 29	My Idol	Sara Burnett	Jessica Myrberg	Erik Segerstedt
October 6	Swedish Hits	Natalie Kadric	Jonas Snäckmark	Jessica Myrberg (2)
October 13	Millennium Hits	Jessica Myrberg (3)	Linda Seppänen	Johan Larsson
October 20	Rock	Jonas Snäckmark (2)	Cissi Ramsby	Johan Larsson (2)
October 27	Audition Songs	Linda Seppänen (2)	Cissi Ramsby (2)	Johan Larsson (3)
		Bottom two
November 3	Unplugged	Danny Saucedo	Cissi Ramsby (3)
November 10	Motown	Cissi Ramsby (4)	Erik Segerstedt (2)
		Eliminated contestant
November 17	Love Songs	Felicia Brandström
November 24	Jury's Choices	Johan Larsson (4)
December 1		Erik Segerstedt (3)	Markus Fagervall

== Elimination chart ==
Stages:		Semi-finals				WC	Finals									
Dates:		09/18	09/19	09/20	09/21	09/22	09/29	10/6	10/13	10/20	10/27	11/3	11/10	11/17	11/24	12/1
Place	Contestant	Result														
1	Markus Fagervall		1st													Winner
2	Erik Segerstedt				Elim	2nd	Btm 3						Btm 2			Runner-up
3	Johan Larsson				1st				Btm 3	Btm 3	Btm 3				Elim	
4	Felicia Brandström			2nd										Elim		
5	Cissi Ramsby			Elim		1st				Btm 2	Btm 2	Btm 2	Elim			
6	Danny Saucedo		2nd									Elim				
7	Linda Seppänen	1st							Btm 2		Elim					
8	Jonas Snäckmark				2nd			Btm 2		Elim						
9	Jessica Myrberg	2nd					Btm 2	Btm 3	Elim							
10	Natalie Kadric			Elim		JC		Elim								
11	Sara Burnett			1st			Elim									
Wild; Card	Patrizia Helander			Elim		Elim										
Wild; Card	John-A. Eriksson		Elim			Elim										
Wild; Card	Emma Fällman	Elim				Elim										
Semi	Noel Filipinas				Elim											
Semi	Robert Hanna				Elim											
Semi	David Fjällborg		Elim													
Semi	Dennis Lindberg		Elim													
Semi	Cosima Lamberth	Elim														
Semi	Lisa Mårtensson	Elim														

== Idol 2006 album ==
Det bästa från Idol 2006 (The Best from Idol 2006) is a sampling Swedish Idol 2007 shows. It was released on 21 November 2007.
