= Amwin =

Swedish singer-songwriter, model, and influencer

- Born: Amanda Linnéa Cecilia Winberg; 20 June 1996 (age 30); Särö, Sweden
- Origin: Stockholm, Sweden
- Genres: Pop; electronica; hip hop
- Occupations: Singer-songwriter; model; influencer
- Years active: 2015–present
- Labels: UMG; Island; Dew Process

Amanda Linnéa Cecilia Winberg (born 20 June 1996), performing as Amwin (stylized in uppercase), is a Swedish pop singer-songwriter, model, and influencer who first came to prominence as runner-up of the eleventh season of Swedish Idol in 2015, which led to her being signed to Universal Sweden, Island Records for UK, and Dew Process for Australia and New Zealand. Her debut EP AMWIN in Wonderland was released in 2019.

== Early life ==
Amanda Linnéa Cecilia Winberg was born south of Gothenburg in Särö, Kungsbacka Municipality, Halland County, Sweden on 20 June 1996. Winberg stated she took a while to realize her passion for music, and had originally planned to become a lawyer.

== Career ==
=== 2015–2017: Early years and Swedish Idol ===
In August 2015 at the age of 18, Amanda Winberg successfully auditioned for the eleventh season of Swedish Idol where she covered Rita Ora's "R.I.P." On 20 November, during the finals, Winberg performed her original song "Rule the World" which got her through to the grand final, the song was later released as a single. During the grand final with Martin Almgren, she lost to his original song "Can't Hold Me Down". On 27 November, Winberg was featured on the Christmas compilation album Jul med Idol performing "Ave Maria", and "Last Christmas" featuring the other top 12 Swedish Idol co-stars.

Signing onto Universal Sweden in 2016, Winberg released three singles under her own name. Her debut single "Shutdown" was released on 23 March alongside an accompanying music video. Her second single "Clouds" was released on 23 September alongside an accompanying music video. Her third and final single under her own name, "Goodbye" was released on 2 December alongside an accompanying music video.

=== 2018–present: Name change and AMWIN in Wonderland ===
In 2018, Amanda begun performing under the moniker 'Amwin', an abbreviation of her given and surname. Her debut single as Amwin, "Uber", produced by Martin René Falkebo, was released on 13 March alongside an accompanying music video. Her next single, "Living Mistake" was released on 12 July alongside an accompanying music video. The single "DeLorean" was released on 10 October alongside its music video. Finding a DeLorean proved to be difficult however as they are a rare sight, in Sweden especially, Amwin and her team eventually got in contact with the only person in Stockholm who owned one who later agreed to have it used in the music video. Amanda also became an influencer, using her presence on social media to promote anything from clothing lines to charities.

In February 2019, at the Stockholm Fashion Week, Winberg modeled in her stylist Selam Fessahaye's show. On 15 February, Australian electronic musician and producer Alice Ivy released a remix of Amwin's track "DeLorean". Her debut EP AMWIN in Wonderland was released on 29 March and contained her previously singles released under her 'Amwin' moniker. Making the EP, Amwin collaborated with songwriters and producers like Carli Löf (Robyn, Galantis), Jay Weathers (Not3s, Jacob Banks), and Carl Lehman (Liam Payne, Panic at the Disco!). On 3 April, Amwin released the single "Dua Lipa" (named after the British singer of the same name), alongside an accompanying music video. The single is a self-proclaimed love song to the British artist. Amwin then went on to perform a summer tour in her home country of Sweden in May, she does plan to touring internationally in the future. In June, Amwin participated in Midem's second annual Songwriting Camp.

== Musical style ==
Amwin's genre of music is described as being a mix of pop, electronic, and hip-hop. Amwin states she grew up listening to, and being influence by, a variety of music and genres ranging from Nirvana to Sinéad O'Connor, to the Fugees, Madonna and Britney Spears. Amwin also says she draws inspiration from the artists FKA Twigs' fashion and rapper M.I.A. Often her songs contain overly sexual lyrics and themes, they've also been described as blunt and straightforward.

== Discography ==
=== Extended plays ===
List of extended plays
| Title | EP details |
|---|---|
| AMWIN in Wonderland | Released: 29 March 2019; Label: Universal Sweden, Island UK, Dew Process; Format: Digital download |

=== Singles ===
| Title | Year | Album |
|---|---|---|
as Amanda Winberg
| "Rule the World" | 2015 | non-album singles |
| "Shutdown" | 2016 | non-album singles |
| "Clouds" | 2016 | non-album singles |
| "Goodbye" | 2016 | non-album singles |
as AMWIN
| "Uber" | 2018 | AMWIN in Wonderland |
| "Living Mistake" | 2018 | AMWIN in Wonderland |
| "DeLorean" | 2018 | AMWIN in Wonderland |
| "Dua Lipa" | 2019 | AMWIN in Wonderland |

=== Album appearances ===
List of album appearances
| Title | Year | Album |
|---|---|---|
| "Last Christmas" (with Swedish Idol Top 12) | 2015 | Jul med Idol |
| "Ave Maria" | 2015 | Jul med Idol |

=== Music videos ===
| Title | Year | Director(s) |
|---|---|---|
| "Shutdown" | 2016 | Mauri Chifflét |
| "Clouds" | 2016 | August Segerholm |
| "Goodbye" | 2016 | Simon Jung Krestesen |
| "Living Mistake" | 2018 | Amwin; Simon Jung Krestesen |
| "DeLorean" | 2018 | Unknown |
| "Dua Lipa" | 2019 | Nicolina Knapp |
