= Gathania Holmgren =

Gathania
- Born: Gathania Holmgren; 1 August 1986 (age 39)
- Origin: Stockholm, Sweden
- Genres: Pop, R&B
- Occupation: Singer
- Instrument: Vocals
- Years active: 2007–present
- Labels: EMI (Sweden), Hard2Beat (United Kingdom)

Gathania Holmgren, known professionally as Gathania (born 1 August 1986, Stockholm), is a Swedish pop singer who competed on Idol 2007, the fourth season of Swedish Idol.

Before finding success on Idol, Sweden's adaptation of the popular music competition, Holmgren worked as a waitress. Holmgren was 20 years old when she auditioned for Idol in Stockholm. She performed "Rhythm of the Night" and was chosen by the judges to advance to the next round. Holmgren advanced to the finals of the competition, finishing in ninth place overall.

Holmgren is currently signed with EMI in Sweden, and Hard2Beat Records in the United Kingdom. She cites Madonna, Whitney Houston, Earth Wind and Fire, Kool and the Gang, and Michael Jackson as some of her musical influences. Her first single was "Get It Out" released in February 2009, and it charted in DigiListan for four weeks. Her second single, "Blame It On You", was released later that year.

== Singles ==
Year	Title	Chart Positions
Year	Title	SWE
2009	"Get It Out"	27
2009	"Blame It On You"	39
