= Daniel Breitholtz =

Swedish record producer

- Born: 18 October 1977 (age 48); Sweden
- Occupations: Record producer, television personality

Daniel Breitholtz (born 18 October 1977) is a Swedish former A&R-manager at Sony BMG. Together with voice coach Kishti Tomita, manager and talent scout Peter Swartling and producer, musician and disc jockey Claes "Clabbe" af Geijerstam, he was part of the Idol 2004, Idol 2005, Idol 2006 and Idol 2007 jury.

Breitholtz has a history with artists like Whitney Houston, Westlife, Outkast and Toni Braxton. Breitholtz has also been a publisher for some of the most successful songwriters, who have written music for Celine Dion, Britney Spears, Westlife and Christina Aguilera among others. Since April 2016 Breitholtz has worked as the Senior Music Programmer at Spotify.
