= This Moment (Marie Picasso song) =

Single by Marie Picasso

from the album The Secret
- Released: 8 December 2007
- Recorded: 2007
- Genre: Pop
- Length: 3:36
- Label: Sony BMG
- Songwriter(s): Mårten Eriksson; Lina Eriksson
- Producer(s): Mårten Eriksson

Marie Picasso singles chronology
"This Moment" (2007)	"Winning Streak" (2008)

"This Moment" is a ballad that was released as the debut single of Marie Picasso, the winner of the fourth series of the Swedish singing competition Idol in 2007. The song was written by Swedish songwriters Mårten and Lina Eriksson, and produced by the former. The song debuted and peaked at number one on the Swedish Singles Chart, holding the top spot for two consecutive weeks. It was certified double platinum for sales of over 40,000 copies.

With the song, Picasso also scored a Svensktoppen hit, charting between 13 January and 10 February 2008. It peaked at number three on the chart. It also charted at Trackslistan, peaking at number seven, while topping Digilistan.

The song was originally intended to have been performed at Melodifestivalen 2008 by Carola Häggkvist, who rejected the song during the autumn of 2007.

== Track listing ==
CD single

1. "This Moment" – 3:36
2. "This Moment" [Instrumental] – 3:36

== Charts ==
Chart (2007–2008)	Peak position
Sweden (Sverigetopplistan)	1
