= The Moniker =

Swedish singer and songwriter (born 1981)

The Moniker (earlier as Daniel Karlsson)
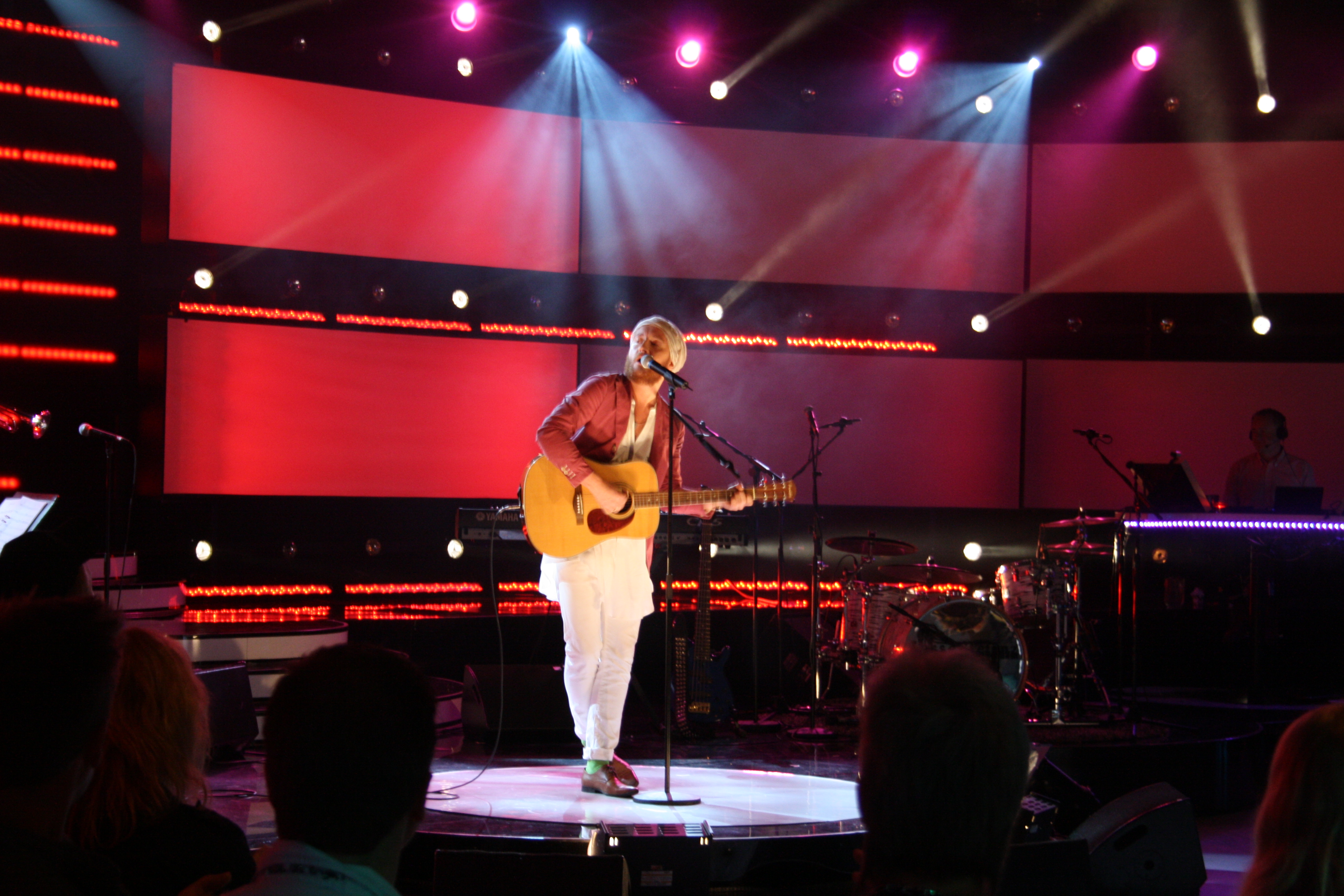

Background information
- Born: Daniel Karlsson; 31 August 1981 (age 44)
- Origin: Jönköping, Sweden
- Genres: Rock; pop
- Occupations: Singer, songwriter
- Instruments: Vocals, guitar
- Years active: 2007–present
- Labels: 5 'O Clock Records/Warner Music

Daniel Karlsson (born 31 August 1981 in Norrahammar, Jönköping, Sweden) is a Swedish singer and songwriter. He later on took the name The Moniker as his stage name.

== As Daniel Karlsson ==
Karlsson participated in Idol 2007. He finished in fourth place behind winner Marie Picasso, runner-up Amanda Jenssen and third-placed Andreas Sjöberg. His interpretation of John Farnham's "You're the Voice" was included in the album Det bästa från Idol 2007 (The Best from Idol 2007).

In October 2008, Karlsson released his first single, called "Would You Believe". A music video was also released to accompany the song.

== As The Moniker ==
In March 2011, under the name The Moniker, he took part in the Melodifestivalen 2011 with his a song he had composed entitled "Oh My God!" and coming third behind winner Eric Saade with "Popular" and runner-up Danny Saucedo with "In the Club".

He again took part in 2012 with the song "I Wanna Be Chris Isaak (This Is Just the Beginning)." After the first round of voting it was revealed that he came last, failing to advance further in the competition.

== In popular culture ==
Daniel Karlsson took part, alongside Karl Martindahl and Robin Bengtsson in the charity single "Wake Up World", the official release for "Hjälp Haiti".

== Discography ==
=== Albums ===
as The Moniker

Year	Album	Peak positions	Certification
Year	Album	SWE	Certification
2011	Maktub	9	

=== Singles ===
As Daniel Karlsson

Title	Year	Peak positions	Album
Title	Year	SWE	Album
"You're the Voice"	2007	41	
"Would You Believe"	2008	9	

As The Moniker

Year	Single	Peak positions	Certifications	Album
Year	Single	SWE	Certifications	Album
"Oh My God!"	2011	4	GLF: Platinum	Maktub
"I Want to Be Chris Isaak"	2012	–		
"Strange"	2014	55		
