= Ayesha Quraishi =

Swedish rapper

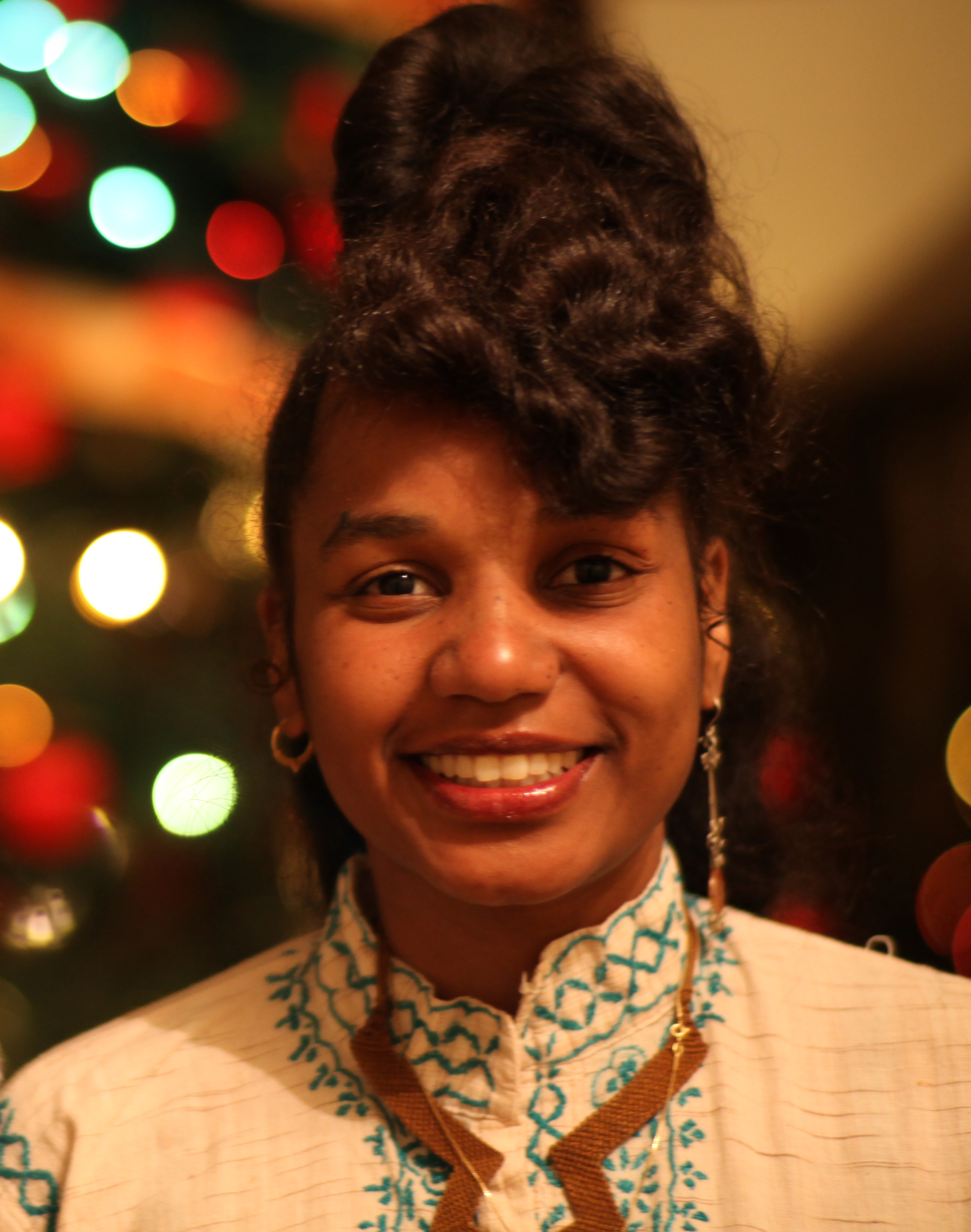
- Ayesha in Stockholm 2016
- Born: Ayesha Quraish; 8 July 1981 (age 44); Gaborone, Botswana
- Occupations: Presenter; singer; rapper; record executive
- Organization: AsystemQ AB
- Children: 1

Ayesha Quraishi (also known only as Ayesha, born 8 July 1981) is a Botswana-born Swedish presenter, singer and rapper. She also owns the recording company Aqueen Entertainment. She was born in Botswana to a non-resident Indian father and Motswana mother, and was raised in Hässelby, Stockholm.

Quraishi has released an album called Jade Fever and participated in Melodifestivalen 2005. In the summer of 2006 she hosted an installment of Sommar, one of Sweden's most popular radio shows, and in 2007 co-hosted the music program Sommartoppen with Mogge Sseruwagi.

== Early life and education ==
Quraishi was born in Botswana, to an Indian father who was an engineer and an entrepreneur mother from Botswana. Her father worked for Swedish and Nordic aid organisations like Sida and Danida. This led to the family living in Botswana, Tanzania, Zimbabwe and Sweden where their family was based during her upbringing and she was in Stockholm to do her A levels in Science and pursue her career after graduation.

== Career ==
Quraishi started her professional career in the Fine Arts as part of the performance Art collective "The Dragonz" and landed music collaborations with The Royal Music College, where she wrote and performed the piece "W.P.O" with a 140 piece orchestra at the Stockholm Arts and Science festival 2002. She experimented with drum orchestras Oheema and other local bands throughout this period.

Working out of the Royal College of Art in Stockholm she struck up a collaboration with producer Datafork. They went on to create Quraishi's debut rap album "Jade Fever" that they released independently on the label K-Werks in collaboration with Aqueen Enterprisez, her own label she founded 2001. The album earned critical acclaim and was nominated for several national awards.

Aqueen Ent. grew to a roster of artists including singer songwriter Sona Jarjusey, Reggaeton artists Lady V and Linda Pira that were released as a duo. And also R&B singer Bes. The label produced the duo Kwaanza with Sona and Ayesha writing and performing together in the Eurovision song contest. She was one of five film subjects and produced and performed the music for Mia Engberg's theatrical documentary release "165 Hässelby".

Quraishi started developing the project Q which was at the time an online social platform around 2005. The project established her in the start up world but did not succeed in raising funding. The idea had a philosophical, system theoretical core to it that led her to establish a career as a public and motivational speaker winning her the praise, Best inspirational speaker and other accolades from business and mainstream publications. Her communication skills led her to work on several national television shows, including Swedish morning news in the culture sector, be a side kick to Malou's "Efter 10" on Tv4, and a panel member on Studio pop a cultural niche show on Swedish public service TV. Quraishi led programs on Swedish national radio and was a summer speaker on the popular Swedish radio show "Sommar i P1" 2006. She published several article series in publications from political magazines to mainstream newspapers and was part of several future trend spotting panels for Sweden's equivalence to Financial times Daganes Industri and government initiatives.

Quraishi went on to release her second studio album The Lobby to critical acclaim. She studied production and film in Los Angeles where she coproduced the award-winning short fil "Four of a Qind".

She has worked as artistic director for Stockholm's theatre The House of Culture. There she headed such projects as Mapei's critically-acclaimed musical monologue "Råttkungen" and directed the play "Svaret" that sold out before the premiere and was praised for its depiction of female blackness. The play went on to win the year's political award at the Swedish "Scenkonstgalan" and "Play of the year" from entertainment publication Nöjesguiden.

She is on the board of Skap, the membership association for music creators in Sweden, and is involved in grant committees and consults in diversity and inclusion.

In 2024, she was one of 1,005 artists to sign a letter calling for Israel to be excluded from Eurovision due to the ongoing humanitarian crisis in Gaza.
