= Nikki Amini =

Iranian-born Swedish marketer (born 1984)

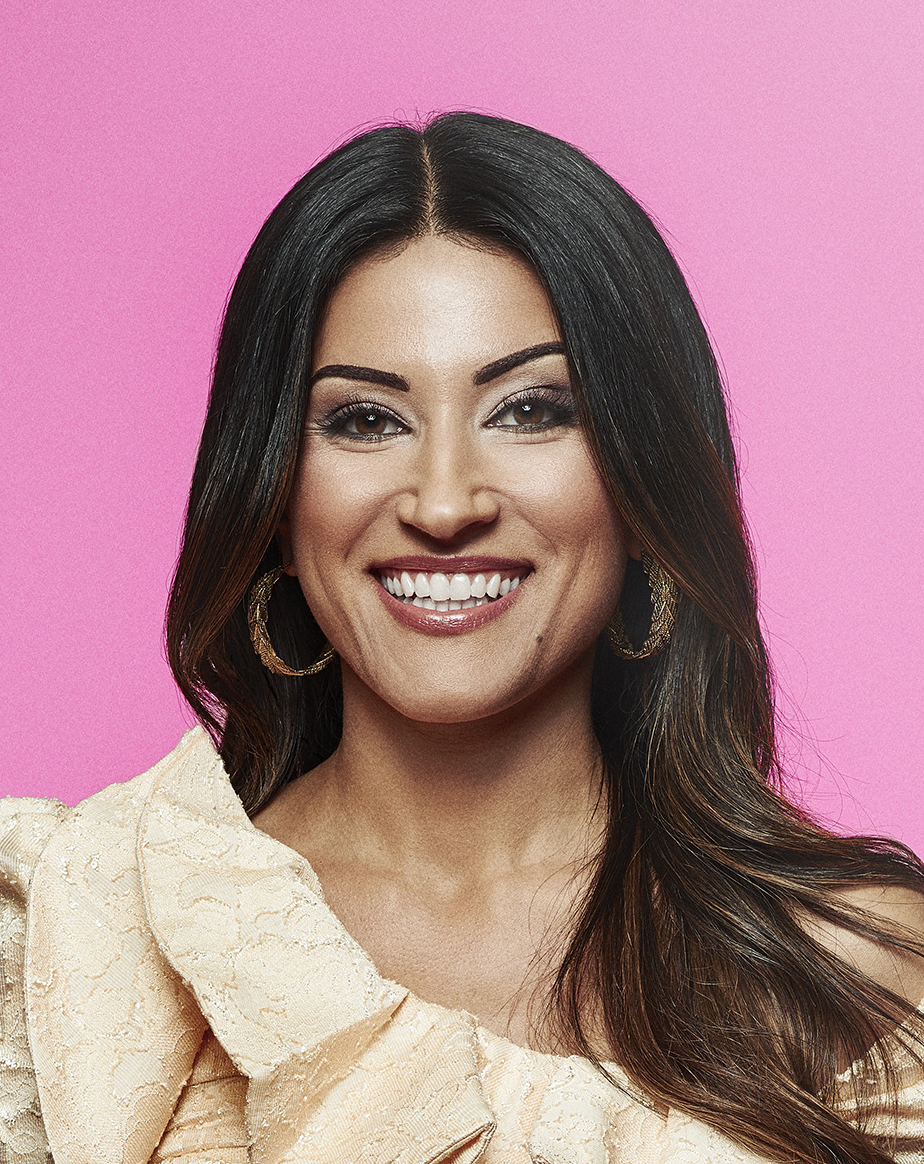
- Nikki Amini, 2018
- Born: Negar Nikki Amini; October 23, 1984 (age 42); Tehran, Iran
- Occupations: marketer; TV personality; musician
- Spouse: Niklas Twetman (m. 2017)

Negar Nikki Amini (born 23 October 1984) is an Iranian-born Swedish marketer at Universal Music Groups office in London. Since 2016, she has served as a judge on the Swedish version of Idol broadcast on TV4 - 2016 alongside Fredrik Kempe and Quincy Jones III, and since 2017 alongside Kishti Tomita, Alexander Kronlund and Anders Bagge. She confirmed after 2020's final show that she will not appear in the next season of the show. Having begun her career as a marketer for the record label Warner Music, Amini has worked with musicians including Rihanna, Taylor Swift, Avicii and Justin Bieber. She participated in Let's Dance 2018, which was broadcast on TV4.

== Personal life ==
Amini was born in Tehran, Iran in 1984, and moved to Sweden with her parents when she was one year old. She was raised in Akalla district of Stockholm.
