= A Hole in My Heart =

2004 Swedish experimental drama film

A Hole In My Heart
- Theatrical release poster
- Directed by: Lukas Moodysson
- Written by: Lukas Moodysson
- Produced by: Lars Jönsson
- Starring: Thorsten Flinck; Sanna Bråding; Björn Almroth; Goran Marjanovic
- Cinematography: Malin Fornander; Jesper Kurlandsky; Lukas Moodysson; Karl Strandlind
- Edited by: Michal Leszczylowski
- Production company: Memfis Film
- Distributed by: Sonet Film
- Release dates: 10 September 2004 (TIFF); 17 September 2004
- Running time: 98 minutes
- Country: Sweden
- Language: Swedish

A Hole in My Heart (Swedish: Ett hål i mitt hjärta) is a 2004 Swedish experimental drama film written and directed by Lukas Moodysson, starring Thorsten Flinck, Sanna Bråding, Björn Almroth and Goran Marjanovic. The story revolves around a man who makes a pornographic film in his apartment with a male friend and a woman, while his teenage son stays in his room and listens to ambient noise music.

The film is notable for its explicit imagery, including close-ups of vaginal reconstruction surgery, an uncomfortable anal sex scene, a masturbation scene with a toothbrush, and an extended scene about the woman's vagina. Moodysson leaves the interpretation of the film to the viewer: "I have cooked you a delicious meal, but I'm not going to chew it for you."

== Plot ==
In an apartment somewhere in Sweden, a woman, a man and his friend are recording an amateur porn movie, while the one man's teenage son is trying to stay out of their way in his room. As time progresses, their filming gets out of hand. All the while, the father is concerned that his son has no respect for him, and the son is concerned about how his father treats the woman.

== Cast ==
- Thorsten Flinck as Rickard
- Sanna Bråding as Tess
- Björn Almroth as Erik
- Goran Marjanovic as Geko

== Production ==
Moodysson's original intent was to have the film taking place in the United States, using an American cast. Research was made about the American porn industry, but eventually Moodysson decided to set the story in Sweden: "I was, like, hit by a truck — and that truck was Lilya 4-ever. When I tried to return to that American version, some kind of story that takes place in the American porn industry, I discovered I couldn’t do it. I had to transform it into this much smaller and more claustrophobic Swedish story."

Filming took place during 4 weeks in Trollhättan. The film was shot digitally with DVCams. After the first day of filming, Thorsten Flinck went to a hospital and lied to a doctor about having an aching back, which prompted the doctor to give him three morphine pills. When Flinck woke up the next morning he started the day by swallowing all three pills. He was nearly fired when he arrived at the set on drugs, but was given a second chance. The rest of the production was free from incidents.

== Release ==
The film premiered at the 2004 Toronto International Film Festival. It was released in Sweden on 17 September 2004. The theatrical poster featured a warning sign about strong images. Lukas Moodysson has expressed disapproval over the future VHS and DVD releases of the film (the decision to release it was out of his hands) — he would have preferred a theatres-only release, to avoid children being exposed to it.

=== Critical response ===
The Swedish reception was split. With a few reservations, Malena Janson at Svenska Dagbladet rated the film 5 out of 6 and praised Moodysson for his daring approach: "A Hole in My Heart consolidates Moodysson's role as the fearless innovator, border stretcher and truth teller in European cinema - who fully masters, and isn't reluctant to use, the film medium's artistic and political possibilities. To the delight of those who dare to watch." Jens Peterson at Aftonbladet respected the film for being uncompromising, but couldn't give it a higher rating than 2 out of 5: "Several times, the narrative style stands in the way of the story. A Hole in My Heart is both more overly obvious and stranger than Moodysson's three earlier, better, films. Occasionally even tedious, a word you never could have used about Moodysson."

The film was poorly received by English-language critics. On Rotten Tomatoes it has an approval rating of 44% based on reviews from 18 critics. Metacritic, which uses a weighted average, assigned the film a score of 32 out of 100, based on 10 critics, indicating "generally unfavorable" reviews.

== See also ==
- 2004 in film
- Cinema of Sweden

== Sources ==
- Kenny, Oliver. (2020). Moodysson, Ardenne, Derrida: Reading Genre, Extremity And Controversy Through The Art–Pornography of A Hole in My Heart. Journal of Scandinavian Cinema, 10(1), 67–83. https://doi.org/10.1386/jsca_00014_1
- Larsson, Mariah. (2011). ‘Close Your Eyes and Tell Me What You See’: Sex and Politics in Lukas Moodysson’s Films. In T. Horeck & T. Kendall (Eds.), The New Extremism in Cinema: From France to Europe (pp. 142–153). Edinburgh University Press.
