= Fårbo =

- Location within Kalmar Location within Sweden
- Coordinates: 57°23′N 16°29′E
- Country: Sweden
- Province: Småland
- County: Kalmar County
- Municipality: Oskarshamn Municipality

Area
  - Total: 0.84 km^{2} (0.32 sq mi)

Population (31 December 2010)
  - Total: 517
  - Density: 617/km^{2} (1,600/sq mi)
- Time zone: UTC+1 (CET)
  - Summer (DST): UTC+2 (CEST)

Fårbo is a locality situated in Oskarshamn Municipality, Kalmar County, Sweden with 517 inhabitants in 2010.

Idol participant Mollie Lindén was born in Fårbo.

== Sport ==
Fårbo FF is the name of the local football team
