= Idol 2014 (Sweden) =

- Season 2014
- Hosted by: Pär Lernström
- Judges: Anders Bagge; Laila Bagge Wahlgren; Alexander Bard
- Winner: Lisa Ajax
- Runner-up: Mollie Lindén

Release
- Original network: TV4
- Original release: August 18 – December 5, 2014

Season chronology
- ← Previous; Season 2013 Next → Season 2015

Idol 2014 will be the Swedish Idol series' tenth season, which will likely premiere in August 2014 and end in December 2014. After the completion of season 9, TV4 announced a tenth season, Idol 2014, airing in 2014. The season will, in addition to the competition, also celebrate the show's 10th anniversary. Alexander Bard, Laila Bagge and Anders Bagge will return as judges from last season. The season's host is the same as 2011 and 2013, Pär Lernström.

Contestant who made the Top 24 Tristan Björling died in November 2014.

The finalists became Lisa Ajax and Mollie Lindén. and Lisa Ajax won.

== Elimination Chart ==
The diagram shows how each participant placed during the qualifying week and the weekly finals.

Stadium:		Stage		Semi-Finals						Finals										
Date:		pgm 1-9	10/9	15/9	16/9	17/9	18/9	19/9		26/9	3/10	10/10	17/10	24/10	31/10	7/11	14/11	21/11	28/11	5/12
Place	Competitor	Result																		
1	Lisa Ajax																			Winner
2	Mollie Lindén																			Runner-Up
3	Josefine Myrberg	WC																	Out.	
4	Ludvig Turner							WC 5										Out.		
5	Fanny de Aguiar			3:a				WC 2									Out.			
6	Petter Hedström						3:a	WC 4								Out.				
7	Matilda Gratte	WC													Out.					
8	Philip Spångberg													Out.						
9	Niklas Musco												Out.							
10	Rolf Öhlen				3:a			WC 1				Out.								
11	Charlie Diar	WC									Out.									
12	Twyla Lidén					3:a		WC 3		Out.										
13	Saranda Hasani								Out.											
Semi	Thomas Lundell						3:a	Out.												
Semi	Tristan Björling						3:a	Out.												
Semi	Jennie Thellberg					3:a		Out.												
Semi	May Yamani					3:a		Out.												
Semi	Hampus Ewel				3:a			Out.												
Semi	Samuel Marshall				3:a			Out.												
Semi	Fannie Anderberg	WC		3:a				Out.												
Semi	Mikaela Samuelsson			3:a				Out.												

Legend
Top 12	Top 21	Wildcard contestant	Bottom 2	Eliminated	Quit	safe	Not participated
