= Idol 2015 (Sweden) =

- Season 2015
- Hosted by: Pär Lernström
- Judges: Anders Bagge; Laila Bagge Wahlgren; Alexander Bard
- Winner: Martin Almgren
- Runner-up: Amanda Winberg

Release
- Original network: TV4
- Original release: August 22 – December 4, 2015

Season chronology
- ← Previous; Season 2014 Next → Season 2016

Idol 2015 is the eleventh season of the Swedish Idol series, which began on 17 August 2015 and ended with the final on 4 December 2015. This was the last season with the current jury which consisted of Laila Bagge, Anders Bagge and Alexander Bard. Martin Almgren won the competition, Amanda Winberg became the runner-up and Simon Zion came third.

== Contestants ==
- Anna Sofia Monroy, 16 - Eliminated 4th
- Adam Torsell, 25 - Eliminated 2nd
- Amanda Winberg, 19 - Runner-Up
- Axel Schylström, 23 - 4th Place
- Bori Shoyebo, 16 - Eliminated 5th
- Frans Walfridsson, 17 - Eliminated 7th
- Ida Da Silva, 20 - Eliminated 6th
- Lina Ryden, 21 - Eliminated 1st
- Martin Almgren, 27 - Winner
- Magnus Englund, 20 - Eliminated 3rd
- Simon Zion, 26 - 3rd Place
- Tove Burman, 16 - Eliminated 8th

== Elimination Chart ==
The diagram shows how each participant placed during the qualifying week and the weekly finals.

Stage:		Semi-Finals						Finals										
Date:		14/9	15/9	16/9	17/9	18/9		25/9	2/10	9/10	16/10	23/10	30/10	6/11	13/11	20/11	27/11^{1}	4/12
Place	Competitor	Result																
1	Martin Almgren																	Winner
2	Amanda Winberg																	Runner-Up
3	Simon Zion																	3rd Place
4	Axel Schylström				3rd	WC 4										out		
5	Tove Burman	3rd				WC 3									out			
6	Frans Walfridsson				3rd	WC 2								out				
7	Ida da Silva												out					
8	Bori Shoyebo											out						
9	Anna-Sofia Monroy										out							
10	Magnus Englund									out								
11	Adam Torssell					WC 5			out									
12	Lina Rydén							out										
13	Rebecka Alestig Thunborg			3rd		WC 1	out											
Semi	Herman Gardarfve				3rd	out												
Semi	Lisa Westberg			3rd		out												
Semi	Soha Akile			3rd		out												
Semi	Bahoz Gül		3rd			out												
Semi	Jonathan Jaarnek Norén		3rd			out												
Semi	Johan Hammenfors		3rd			out												
Semi	Arineh Karimi	3rd				out												
Semi	Malikah Semakula	3rd				out												

Legend
Top 12	Top 21	Wildcard contestant	Bottom 2	Eliminated	Quit	safe	Not participated

^{1} All 3 acts Martin Almgren, Amanda Winberg and Simon Zion were declared safe and progressed to the final
