= Jonas Snäckmark =

Swedish metal-singer (born 1986)

- Born: 27 January 1986 (age 39)
- Origin: Halmstad, Halland, Sweden
- Genres: Metal

Jonas "Snäckan" Snäckmark (born 27 January 1986 in Halmstad, Halland County, Sweden) is a Swedish metal-singer who stood out as one of the eleven finalists in Idol 2006 - the Swedish version of Idol.

== Idol 2006 Performances ==
- Auditions, Gothenburg: "You Raise Me Up" - Josh Groban
- Auditions, Stockholm: "Sorry Seems To Be The Hardest Word" - Elton John (Trio)
- Semi Finals: "One" - U2
- Top 11: "Higher" - Creed
- Top 10: "Vi har bara varandra" - Thomas Di Leva
- Top 9: "Here Without You" - 3 Doors Down
- Top 8: "Alive" - Pearl Jam
