= Göran Fristorp =

Swedish singer and songwriter (1948–2024)

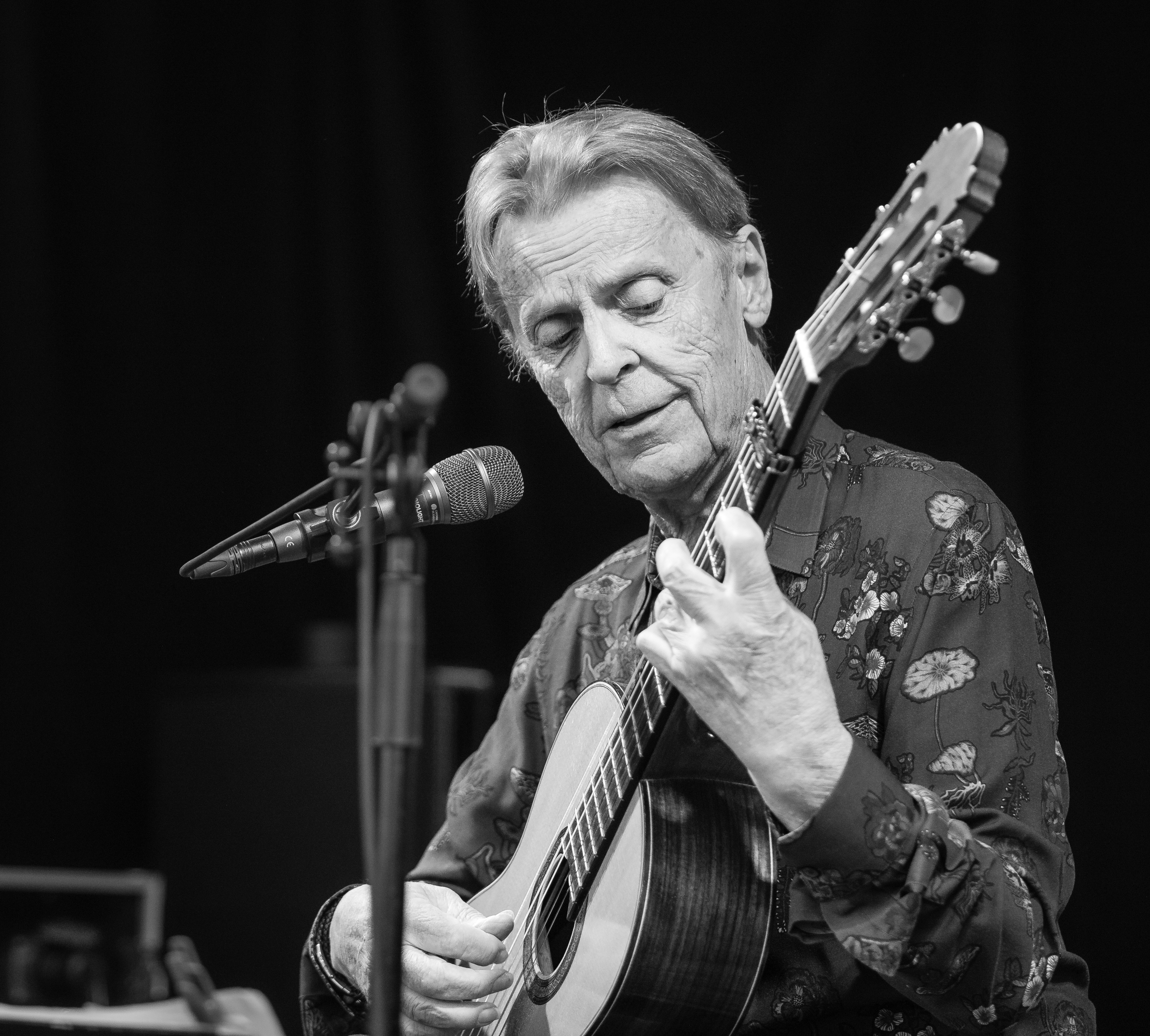
Fristorp in 2022

Karl Göran Fristorp (26 May 1948 – 3 September 2024) was a Swedish singer and songwriter. Fristorp along with Claes af Geijerstam as the duo Malta won Melodifestivalen 1973 with the song "Sommarn som aldrig säger nej". They then represented Sweden in the Eurovision Song Contest 1973 in Luxemburg placing fifth. Fristorp was the pre-act for the Dutch group Ekseption during their German tour between 1974 and 1975. Fristorp died on 3 September 2024, at the age of 76.
