= The Secret (Marie Picasso album) =

Studio album by Marie Picasso
- Released: 19 December 2007
- Genre: pop
- Length: 36:17
- Label: Sony BMG

The Secret, released on 19 December 2007, is the debut album by Marie Picasso.

== Track listing ==
1. Winning Streak
2. Good Thing
3. Earth And Sky
4. This Moment
5. Miracle
6. Romeo
7. Out of My Hands
8. Weak
9. It's Over Now
10. I'll Be There

== Chart positions ==
Chart (2007–2008)	Peak position
Sweden	1
