= Mollie Lindén =

Mollie Minott
- Born: March 6, 1996 (age 30); Fårbo, Sweden
- Genres: Pop
- Occupations: Singer, songwriter
- Years active: 2014–present

Mollie Maxine Lindén (born 6 March 1996) is a Swedish singer, mostly known as an Idol 2014 participant. Lindén also auditioned for X Factor in 2012 which was broadcast on TV4 and made it to the bootcamp round before being eliminated. During 2014 she auditioned for Idol also broadcast on TV4, where she made it to the Top 11 and later to the final at Globen Arena. During her time at Idol she also released the music single "Losing Myself Without You" which was specially written for her during the series.

On 5 December 2014, Lindén was placed second in the Idol 2014 finale against the eventual winner Lisa Ajax.

In 2011, when Lindén was fifteen years old she participated in the television show "Kvällen är din" hosted by Martin Stenmarck. There she sang a duet with James Blunt.

In 2017, she changed her artist name from Mollie Lindén to Mollie Minot.

== Discography ==
=== Singles ===
Title	Year	Peak chart positions	Album
Title	Year	SWE	Album
"Losing Myself Without You"	2014	—	Non-album singles
