= Idol 2007 (Sweden) =

- Season 2007
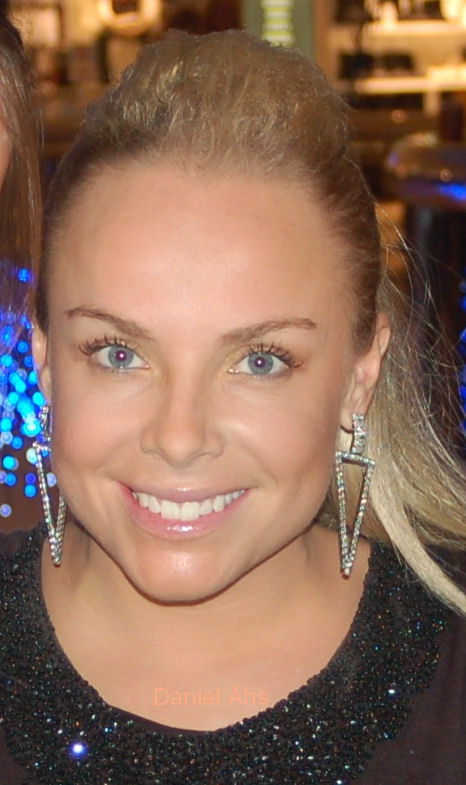
- Marie Picasso
- Hosted by: Peter Jihde; Carina Berg; Carolina Gynning
- Judges: Daniel Breitholtz; Kishti Tomita; Peter Swartling
- Winner: Marie Picasso
- Runner-up: Amanda Jenssen
- Finals venue: Globen

Release
- Original network: TV4
- Original release: 3 September – 7 December 2007

Season chronology
- ← Previous; Season 2006 Next → Season 2008

The fourth season of Swedish Idol premiered on September 3, 2007, and continued until its grand finale on 7 December, when 28-year-old Marie Picasso was crowned winner. It was the first season to feature an all-female finale, and is to date the only season to crown a winner who had previously fallen into the 'bottom three' during the finals, with Picasso landing there twice. It was the first season to hold its grand finale at the Globen Arena in Stockholm, and to date holds the record for the largest live audience at an Idol final anywhere in the world, with a crowd of 16,000 people. The finale also featured a live performance by Kelly Clarkson. It was the final season to feature judges Daniel Breitholtz, Peter Swartling and Kishti Tomita, who all bowed out for various personal reasons. Season 4 of Idol is also credited with discovering the unique talent of runner-up Amanda Jenssen, who went on to achieve enormous commercial and critical success in Sweden.

== Judges ==
- Daniel Breitholtz - Sony BMG manager
- Peter Swartling - Record producer
- Kishti Tomita - Vocal coach

== Hosts ==
- Peter Jihde - Auditions (voiceover) and Finals
- Carolina Gynning - Auditions and Semi-finals
- Carina Berg - Auditions and Semi-finals
- Hannah Graaf - Companion shows Idol Halvtid and Idol Eftersnack
- Doreen Månsson - Companion shows Idol Halvtid and Idol Eftersnack

== Auditions ==
- Gothenburg: April 14, 2007
- Skellefteå: April 22, 2007
- Malmö: April 28, 2007
- Borlänge: May 6, 2007
- Stockholm: May 12, 2007

== Eliminated Semi-finalists ==
- Pär Stenhammar - Eliminated September 24
- Särla Berntson - Eliminated September 25
- Michel Zitron - 1st eliminated September 28
- Tamela Hedström - 2nd eliminated September 28
- Knut Berggren - 3rd eliminated September 28

== Elimination chart ==
Stages:		Semi-Finals					Finals									
Weeks:		09/24	09/25	09/26	09/27	09/28	10/5	10/12	10/19	10/26	11/2	11/9	11/16	11/23	11/30	12/7
Place	Contestant	Result														
1	Marie Picasso								Btm 3				Btm 3			Winner
2	Amanda Jenssen									Btm 2				Btm 2		Runner-up
3	Andreas Sjöberg										Btm 3	Btm 3	Btm 2		Elim	
4	Daniel Karlsson													Elim		
5	Mattias Andréasson								Btm 2	Btm 3	Btm 2	Btm 2	Elim			
6	Christoffer Hiding						Btm 3					Elim				
7	Sam Hagberth							Btm 2			Elim					
8	Evelina Sewerin				Btm 2		Btm 2			Elim						
9	Gathania Holmgren							Btm 3	Elim							
10	Patrizia Helander							Elim								
11	Anastasia Robool						Elim									
Semi	Knut Berggren			Btm 2		Elim										
Semi	Tamela Hedström				Btm 2	Elim										
Semi	Michel Zitron			Btm 2		Elim										
Semi	Särla Berntson		Elim													
Semi	Pär Stenhammar	Elim														

Legend
Women	Men	Top 11	Top 16	Eliminated	Wildcard	Safe	not performed

== Idol 2007 album ==
Det bästa från Idol 2007 (The Best from Idol 2007) is a sampling Swedish Idol 2007 shows. It was released on 21 November 2007.
