= Sanna Bråding =

Swedish actress

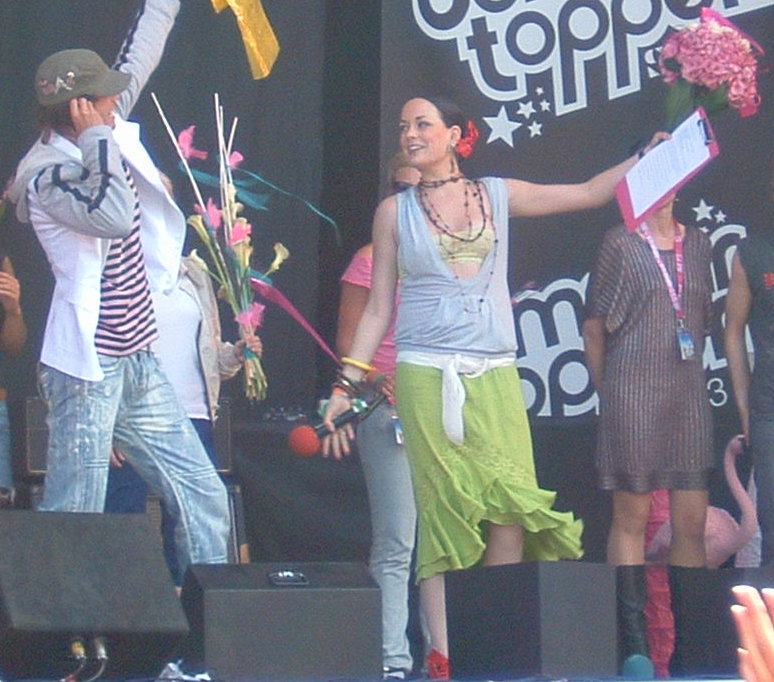
- Born: Sanna Bråding; 5 March 1980; Saltsjö-Boo, Nacka, Sweden
- Occupation(s): Soap opera participant, actress, presenter

Sanna Bråding (born 5 March 1980, in Saltsjö-Boo, Nacka, Stockholm County) is a Swedish actress. Her first appearance was in the soap opera Tre kronor during the 1990s. In 2004, she starred in the film A Hole in My Heart. In 2006, she became a presenter for Idol 2006, the Swedish version of Pop Idol.

On 27 June 2008, Bråding was sentenced to three months in jail with parole supervision following the jail sentence. She was found guilty on three drug charges by Södertörn District Court. Three other people were also sentenced, among them, her boyfriend who received one year and eight months in jail. On appeal, the sentence was reduced to one month.

== Filmography ==
=== Film ===
- 1997 - Reine & Mimmi i fjällen! ("Reine and Mimmi in the mountains")
- 2004 - Ett hål i mitt hjärta ("A hole in my heart")
- 2005 - Som man bäddar ("As you make your bed")
- 2007 - 7 miljonärer ("Seven millionaires")

=== Television ===
- 1995 - Tre Kronor ("Three Crowns")
