= Mugambwa Sseruwagi =

Kenyan-Swedish actor/musician/presenter (born 1978)

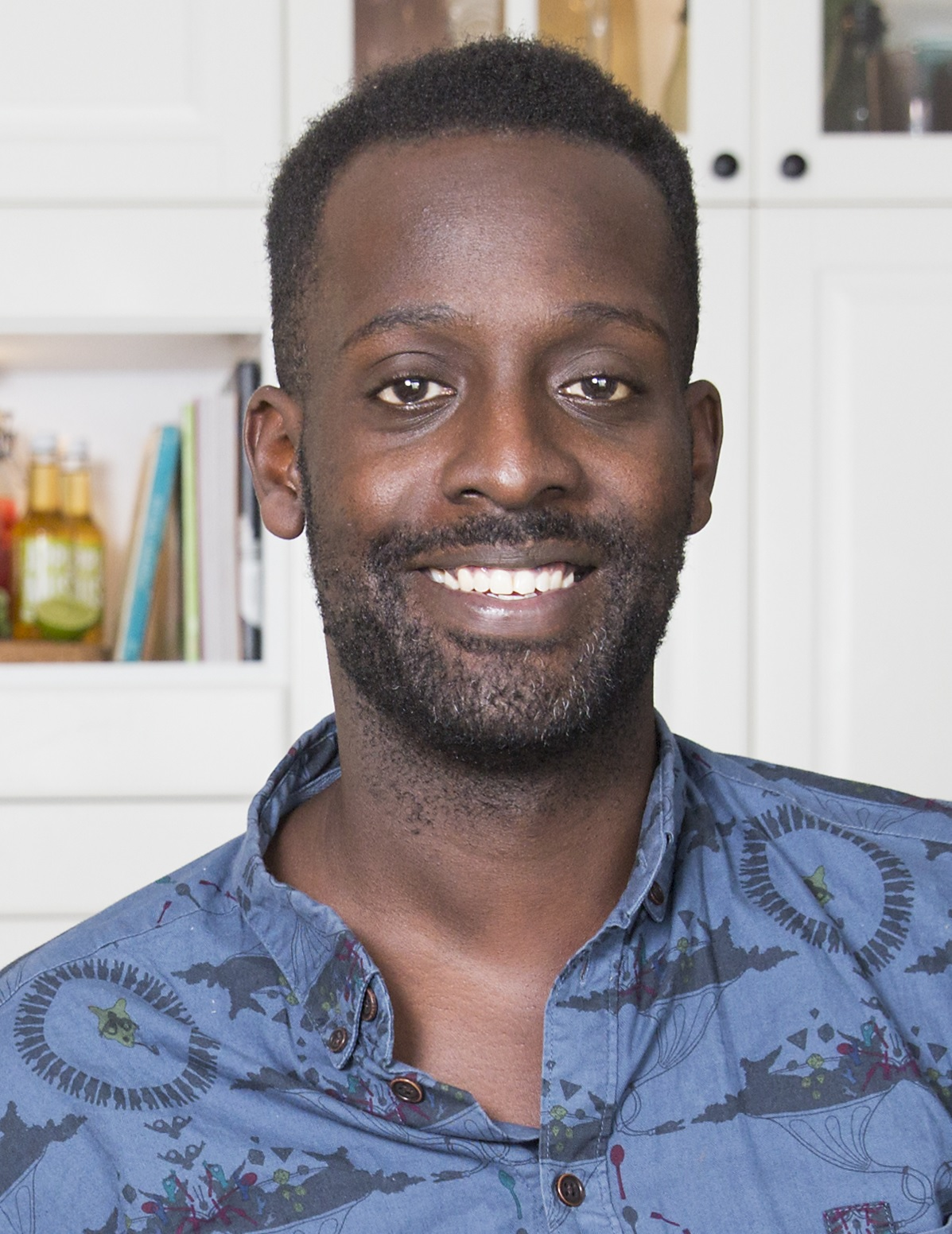
Mugambwa Sseruwagi

Mugambwa "Mogge" Sseruwagi (born 17 May 1978, in Kenya) is a Kenyan-Swedish actor/musician/television presenter. He appeared in the soap opera Tre Kronor. As an artist, he is known as Masayah and has released two records. In 2006, he became a presenter on the Swedish version of Pop Idol, Idol 2006. In January 2007, Sseruwagi was appointed "Best dressed man" by the Swedish Elle magazine. In the summer of that year, he co-hosted the radio show Sommartoppen alongside Ayesha Quraishi.
