= Marie Picasso =

Swedish singer, host and model (born 1979)

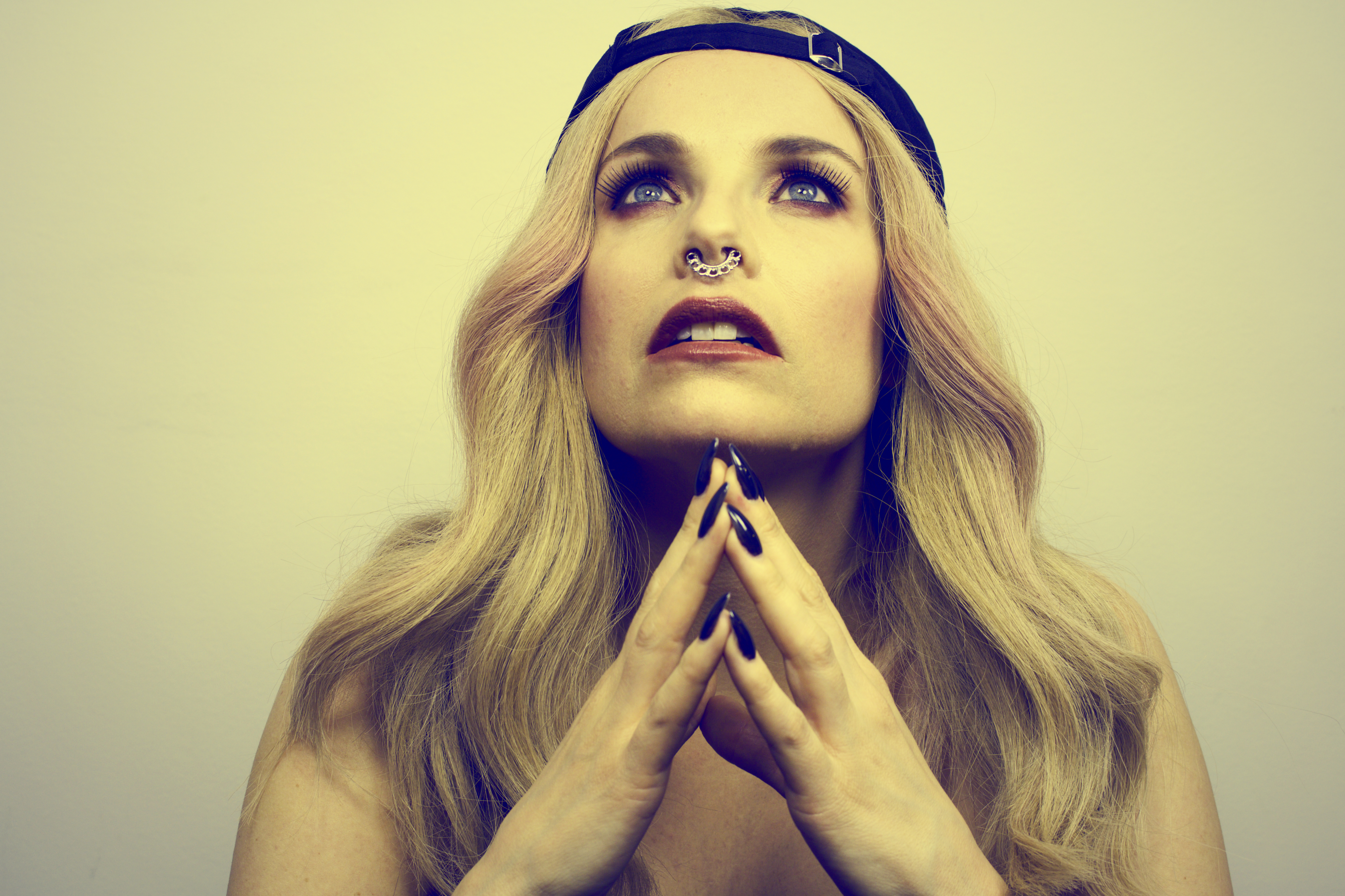

Background information
- Born: Lilly Marie Pettersson; 24 April 1979 (age 47)
- Origin: Sweden
- Genres: Pop, pop rock
- Occupations: Singer, presenter, model
- Instrument: Singing
- Years active: 1999–present
- Label: Sony BMG (2007–present)
- Website: mariepicasso.se/marie

Marie Picasso (born Lilly Marie Pettersson on 24 April 1979) is a Swedish singer, host and model who first rose to fame as a housemate on the popular reality television show Big Brother, before going on to win the fourth series of the Swedish singing competition Idol.

== Biography ==
=== Big Brother ===
In 2002, Picasso appeared as a housemate on the reality television show Big brother. After leaving the house, she went on to host several game shows on TV4, and also released a single titled "Do it again" in Germany, which was used to promote a local soap opera ” Eva ganz mein fall”

=== Idol 2007 ===
In the summer of 2007, Picasso auditioned for the fourth series of the popular Swedish singing competition Idol in Stockholm, singing "Beautiful" by Christina Aguilera. The three judges were impressed by her emotion-filled voice and she passed through to the next stage of the contest with a unanimous "yes" vote. Several weeks later, Picasso made it into the top 11 contestants, and her powerful voice continued to wow the judges and the public. Picasso made it through to the finale at the Globen Arena, and on 7 December, she was crowned as the fourth Swedish Idol, defeating runner-up Amanda Jenssen by a margin of only 2%. It was the biggest IDOL final in the world at that point, and maybe to this day with around 14.000 thousand people in the audiance. TV4 received some criticism for including Picasso in the series as she had worked for TV4 as a presenter and also had a professional singing career before entering Idol.

==== Idol performances ====
- Stockholm Auditions: "Beautiful" by Christina Aguilera
- Top 16 "I Can't Make You Love Me" by Mike Reid and Allen Shamblin
- Top 14 "The Power of Love" by Jennifer Rush
- Top 11 1-Hit Wonders: "Baby Love" by Mother's Finest
- Top 10 Movie Themes: "Flashdance...What a Feeling" by Irene Cara
- Top 9 Hitlist: "Big Girls Don't Cry" by Fergie – Bottom 3
- Top 8 Blood, Sweat and Tears: "I'll Be There" by The Jackson 5
- Top 7 Dedicated To...: "Always on My Mind" by Willie Nelson
- Top 6 Disco: "Ain't Nobody" by Chaka Khan
- Top 5 Gospel: "How Will I Know" by Whitney Houston – Bottom 3
- Top 4 Rock: "Weak" by Skunk Anansie
- Top 4 Rock: "You Oughta Know" by Alanis Morissette
- Top 3 Judge's Choice: "I Have Nothing" by Whitney Houston
- Top 3 Judge's Choice: "Maneater" by Nelly Furtado
- Top 2 Grand Finale: "All By Myself" by Eric Carmen
- Top 2 Grand Finale: "I'll Be There" by The Jackson 5
- Top 2 Grand Finale: "This Moment" by Marie Picasso – Declared 4th Swedish Idol

== Post-Idol Career ==
=== 2007–2008: The Secret ===
Immediately after winning Idol, Picasso signed a recording contract with Sony BMG and her debut single, "This Moment", was released. A week later, the song debuted at number one on the Swedish singles chart, and after holding the top spot for two weeks, the single was certified double platinum for the sale of 40,000 copies. Her debut album, The Secret, was quickly recorded and released on 19 December, only weeks after her victory. Like its lead single, The Secret also debuted at number one. After only one week on the chart, Picasso's album was certified gold for the sale of almost 30,000 copies. The album went on to hold the top spot for three consecutive weeks, longer than any other Idol winner.

In early January 2008, Picasso announced her first national tour titled The Secret Tour to support her debut album. The tour commenced on 25 January in Vasteras and ended on 5 April in Örebro, with Picasso performing a total of 23 sold-out shows across Sweden. In March 2008, The Secret was certified platinum, having sold just over 60,000 copies since its release. As the supportive tour neared its end, Picasso released "Winning Streak", the second single to be taken from her debut album. However, the song failed to gain popularity and as a result did not sell enough copies to reach the official top 60 of the Swedish singles chart. The single's failure to chart was all the more surprising because Picasso had previously attained multi-platinum sales from her first single and debut album, and only recently completed a hugely successful, sell-out tour.

=== 2008–present: record rumours and second album ===
Throughout the early summer of 2008, Picasso continued to promote her debut album with appearances on both Swedish television and summer festivals, performing a variety of tracks from the album. Toward the end of the summer, rumours began to circulate that Sony BMG were planning to release Picasso from her record contract. The failure of her second single was cited as one of the reasons, as was the apparently greater success of Amanda Jenssen, whom Picasso has defeated in the finale of Idol.

During an interview in September 2008, Sony BMG marketing manager Magnus Klint stated that the label was "in discussions with Picasso" about her future with the label and that although they hoped to co-operate with her, nothing was set. She also made an appearance on I Survived, a Japanese game show, in 2009.

Picasso was announced as a songwriter for the song "Alive", to be performed by singer Jasmine Abela in the Maltese national selection for the Eurovision Song Contest 2016.

== Discography ==
Marie Picasso discography
- Studio albums: 1
- Singles: 2
- Music videos: 2
- B-sides: 2
- Other Charted Songs: 1
- Tours: 1

The following is a complete discography of every album and single released by Swedish pop and pop-rock singer Marie Picasso.

=== Albums ===
Year	Information	Sweden	Sales and Certifications
2007	The Secret: First studio album; Released: 19 December 2007; Label: Sony BMG; Format: CD	1	Swedish sales: 62,000 IFPI: Platinum

=== Singles ===
Year	Song	Sweden	Certification	Album
2007	"This Moment"	1	2xPlatinum (IFPI)	The Secret
2008	"Winning Streak"	—	—	The Secret

=== Other charted songs ===
Year	Song	Sweden
2007	"Flashdance... What a Feeling"	54

=== Tours ===
2008: The Secret Tour

Preceded by Markus Fagervall	Idol winner Marie Picasso (2007)	Succeeded by Kevin Borg

== Sources ==
- TV4s idol page- Retrieved from Tv4 homepage
- Marie Picasso tittarnas favorit – retrieved from aftonbladet
