= Kishti Tomita =

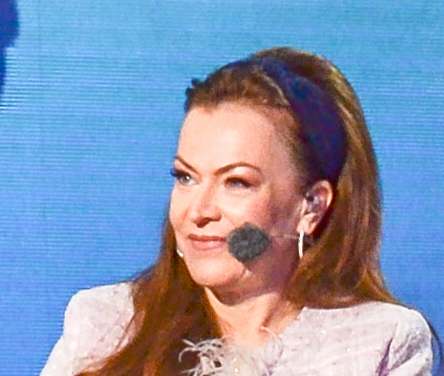

Background information
- Born: Kirsti Sylvia Margareta Olsén; 19 November 1963 (age 62)
- Origin: Farsta, Sweden
- Genre: Soul
- Website: kishtitomita.se

Kishti Tomita (born 19 November 1963) is a Swedish voice coach, TV personality and singer. Together with A&R manager Daniel Breitholtz and manager and talent scout Peter Swartling, she was a part of the Swedish Idol 2004, Idol 2005, Idol 2006 and Idol 2007,’’ 2017- 2023 jury.

On 26 February 2008, it was revealed that Tomita had quit the Idol jury and would not appear in Idol 2008; none of the other two jury members attended the next season.

On 10 May, Tomita was a background singer and Voice Coach for the Russian entry in the Eurovision Song Contest 2011 after one of the other Swedish background singers became ill. In 2014, she discovered that she had Asperger syndrome.

Tomita returned as a judge in Idol 2017.

Kishti Tomita placed third in the final of the fifth season of Masked Singer Sverige, which was broadcast on TV4.
