= Claes af Geijerstam =

Swedish DJ

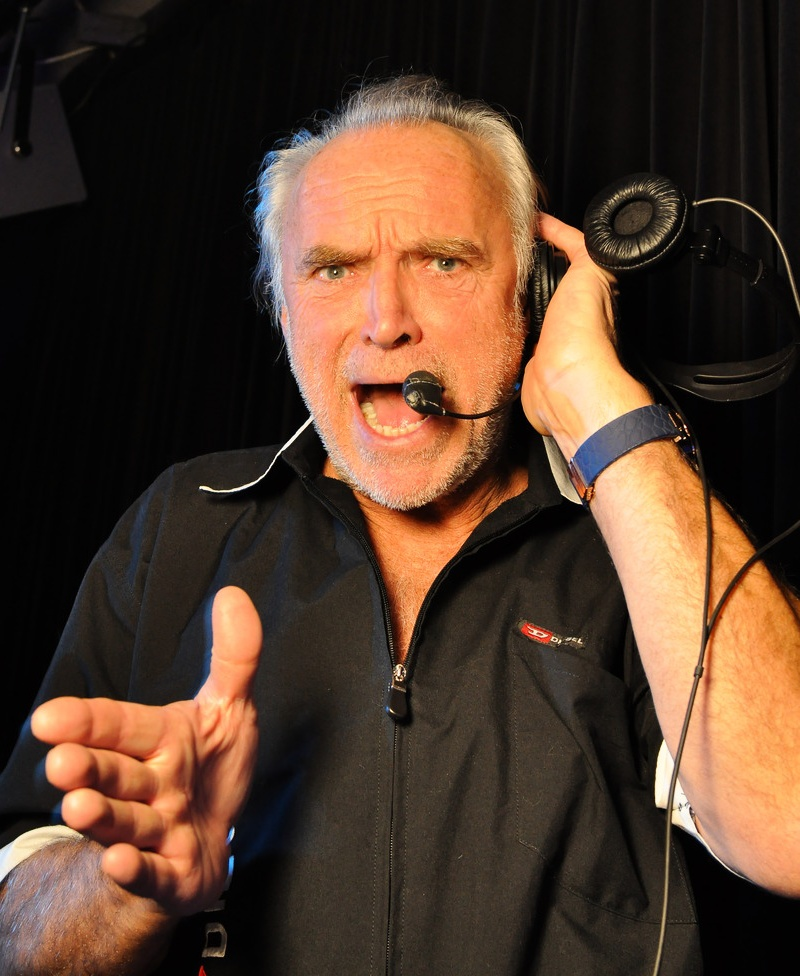
- Claes af Geijerstam in Umeå, Sweden in January 2010
- Born: 6 February 1946 (age 80); Sweden
- Occupations: Musician, radio personality

Claes Olof af Geijerstam (Swedish pronunciation: [ˈklɑːs ɑːv ˈjɛ̂jːɛˌʂʈam]; born 6 February 1946), nicknamed Clabbe (IPA: [ˈklâbːɛ]), is a Swedish musician, radio personality and DJ who is mostly famous for his talent of rapid speech and his many years as a radio DJ.

He is also known for his role as jury member on the popular Swedish version of Pop Idol during 2004–2006. After the 2006 season, he decided to leave the programme.

Af Geijerstam was part of the pop group Ola & the Janglers in the 1960s.

He formed the group Malta together with Göran Fristorp. They competed in Melodifestivalen 1973 with the song "Sommar'n som aldrig säger nej." They won the contest while a little known group of four called "Agnetha, Anni-Frid, Björn, and Benny" finished in third place with their song "Ring Ring (Bara du slog en signal)." As a result of that victory, the duo represented Sweden in the Eurovision Song Contest 1973 under the name of "Nova and the Dolls", where they translated their song into English with the title "You're Summer (You Never Tell Me No)" and finished fifth.

In 1979, af Geijerstam was the sound engineer for ABBA's North American and European tour.

== See also ==
- Idol
