= Peter Swartling =

Swedish record producer

- Born: 18 November 1964 (age 61); Sweden
- Occupations: Television personality, record producer

Peter Swartling (born 18 November 1964) was one of the Swedish judges on the TV talent show Idol on TV4. He made it clear that he wouldn't participate in the fourth season of Idol due to him being forced to commute between Sweden and United States, where he currently lives. However, despite this, he remains to be a judge on the show.

He is considered to be one of the most successful talent scouts and producers in Swedish music and is behind the breakthrough of artists like Robyn, Petter and Just D. On 26 February 2008 it was revealed that Peter quit as a judge during Idol 2008, none of the other two judges will attend the next season.
