= Norra Vram =

Locality in Skåne County, Sweden

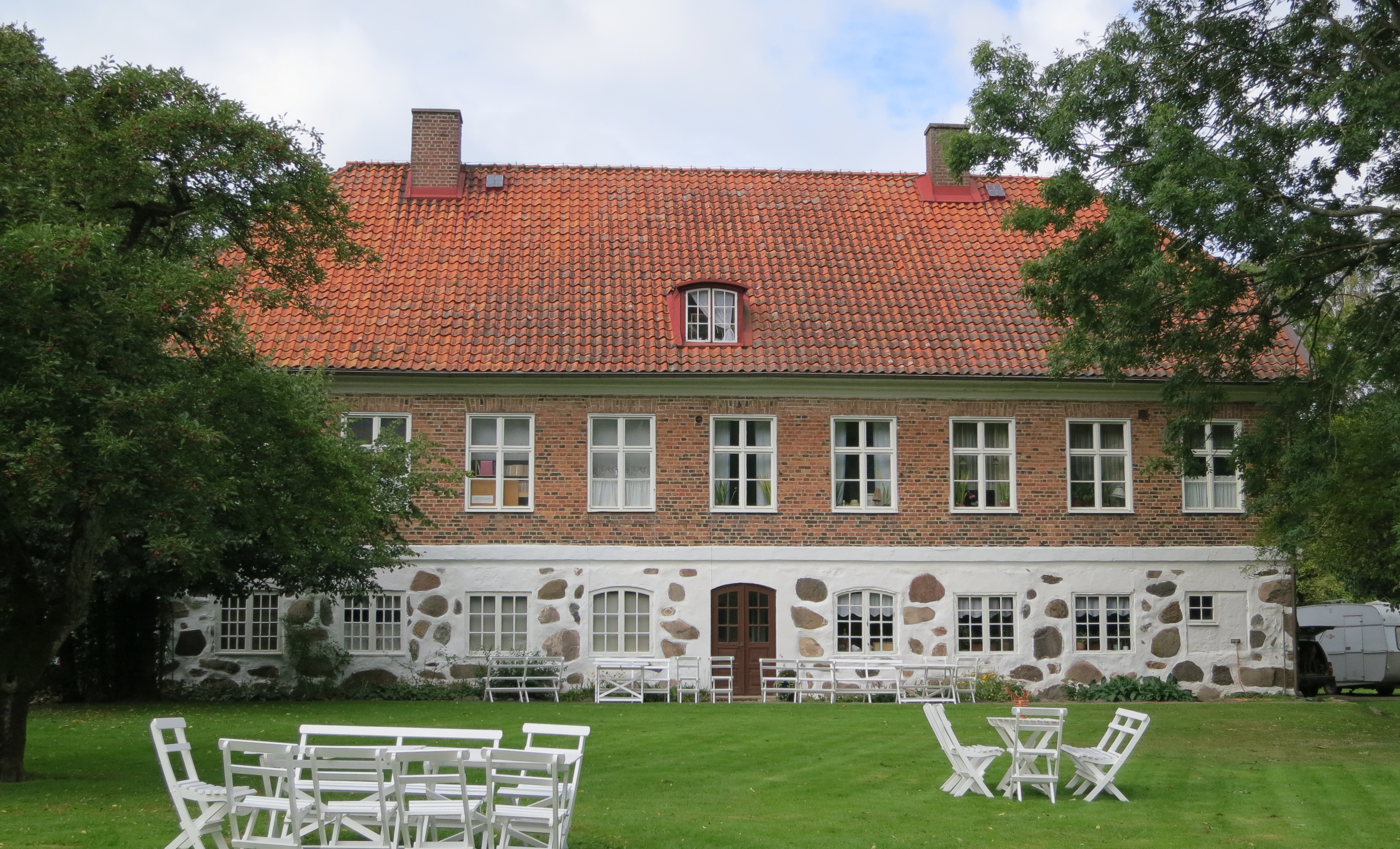
- The Rectory in Norra Vram

- Location within Skåne Location within Sweden
- Coordinates: 56°5′N 12°58′E
- Country: Sweden
- Province: Skåne
- County: Skåne County
- Municipality: Bjuv Municipality

Area
  - Total: 0.4 km^{2} (0.15 sq mi)

Population (2023)
  - Total: 134
- Time zone: UTC+1 (CET)
  - Summer (DST): UTC+2 (CEST)

Norra Vram (North Vram) is a village in Bjuv Municipality, Skåne County, southern Sweden, and the parish village of Norra Vram Parish.

== History and description ==
Norra Vram is located northeast of Bjuv at the foot of the ridge Söderåsen. Norra Vram Church (Norra Vrams kyrka) is located there. Danish nobleman and poet, Jens Bille (1531-1575), is buried in Norra Vram Church.

In Norra Vram, there are plenty of prehistoric archaeological sites, indicating that the area offered favorable conditions and was settled early on. The village is mentioned in a 1322 survey (Landebogen) as “Wraam” and as early as 1330 as “Norrae Vraam.

The 1933 Swedish Summer Grand Prix was held in Norra Vram.

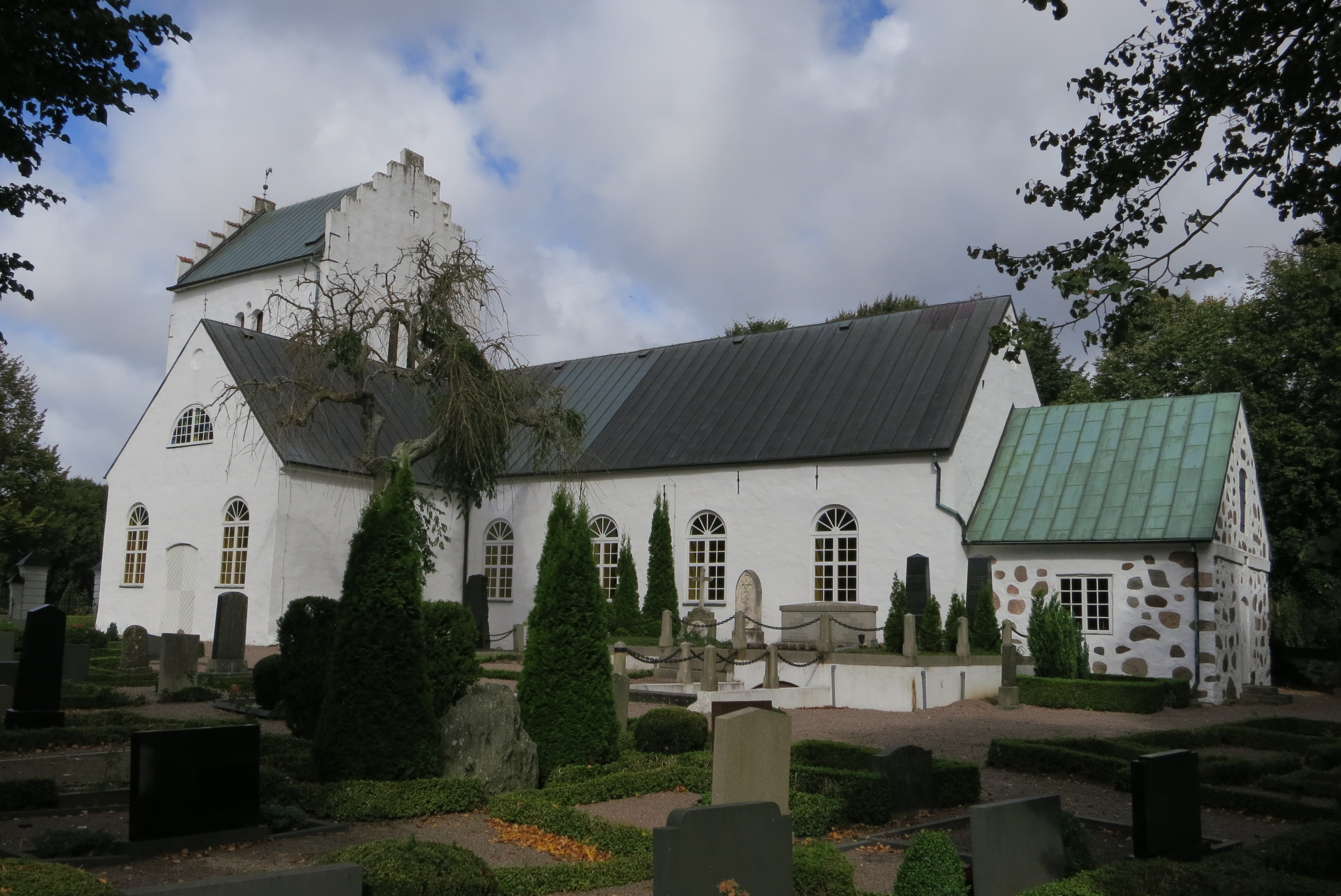
Norra Vram church
