= Suzi P =

Swedish singer (born 2002)

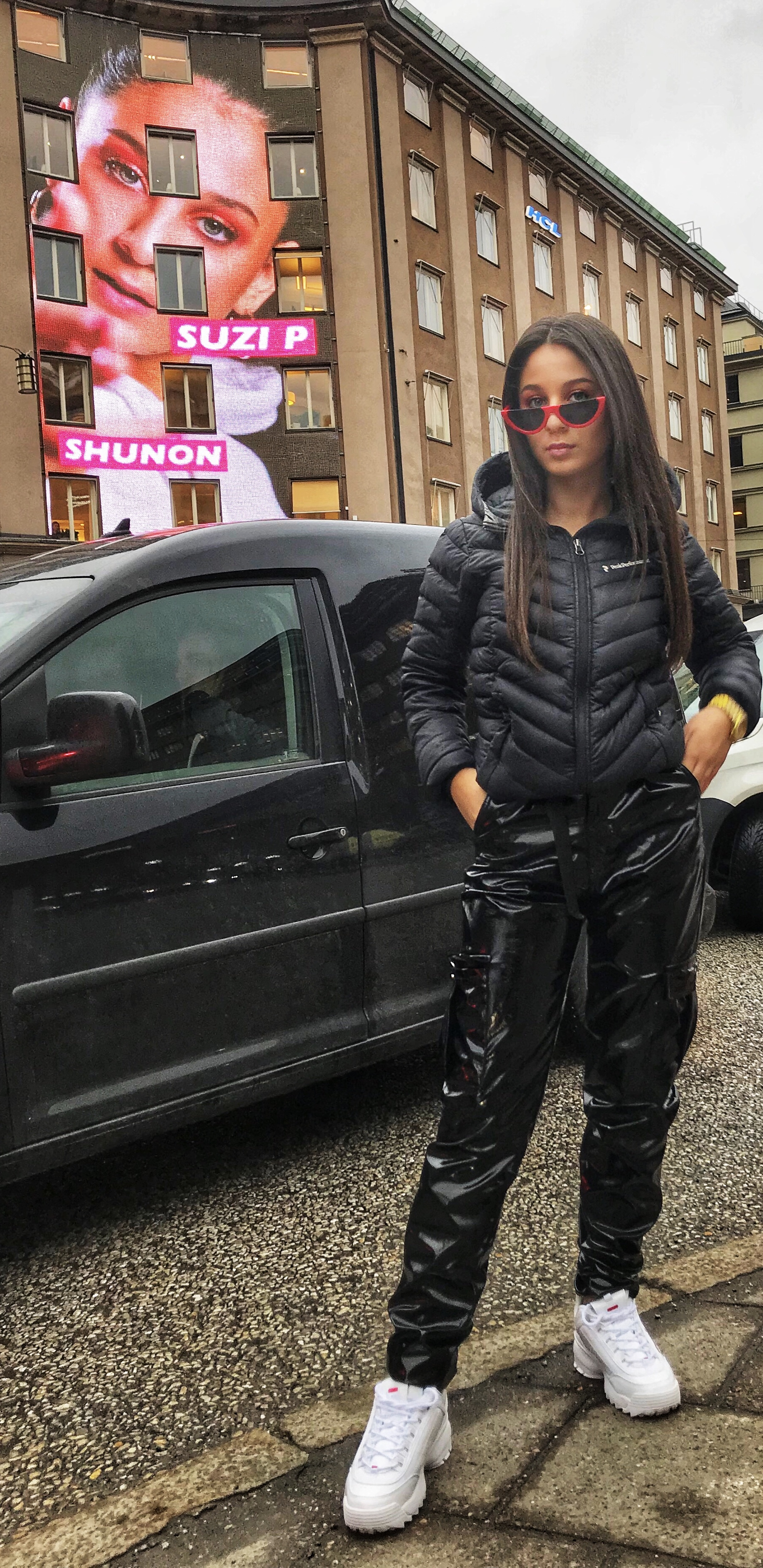
- Suzi P in 2019

Background information
- Born: Suzi Estera Pancenkov; 11 December 2002 (age 23)
- Origin: Bjuv, Sweden
- Genres: Pop, hip hop
- Occupation: Singer

Suzi Estera Pancenkov, better known as Suzi P (born 11 December 2002) is a Swedish pop and hip hop singer. She is the younger sister of Swedish Idol runner-up Paulina Pancenkov. She was born in Bjuv, Sweden.

== Career ==
Suzi grew up in Bjuv, Skåne. She is of Croatian descent. In 2017, she got the attention of Linda Pira after she sang in a live Facebook video with her sister. She then started to upload covers and her own music on her Instagram account.

In March 2019, she released the music single ”Shunon” under the name Suzi P. The music video for the song was directed by Alexandra Dahlström. In April 2019, Suzi became "Singer of the week" in the Sveriges Radio show P3 Din Gata, and in October 2019 she released her second music single ”Livin' La Vida” produced by Joy Deb.

In August 2019, Suzi appeared in her first televised performance in the children's morning show Sommarlov at SVT. The performance got attention by Aftonbladet and Expressen because her song "Shunon" was considered controversial for that format.

Suzi P participated in Melodifestivalen 2020 which was broadcast on SVT. She performed the song "Moves" which placed seventh in the first semi final.

Suzi P was one of the songwriters for the song "Adrenalina" that represented San Marino in the Eurovision Song Contest 2021, performed by Senhit and Flo Rida.

== Discography ==
=== Singles ===
| Title | Year | Peak chart positions | Album |
| Title | Year | SWE | Album |
|---|---|---|---|
| "Moves" | 2020 | — | Non-album single |
