= Södra Vrams fälad =

- Location within Skåne Location within Sweden
- Coordinates: 56°03′N 13°00′E
- Country: Sweden
- Province: Skåne
- County: Skåne County
- Municipality: Bjuv Municipality

Area
  - Total: 0.42 km^{2} (0.16 sq mi)

Population (31 December 2010)
  - Total: 249
  - Density: 599/km^{2} (1,550/sq mi)
- Time zone: UTC+1 (CET)
  - Summer (DST): UTC+2 (CEST)

Södra Vrams fälad was a locality situated in Bjuv Municipality, Skåne County, Sweden with 249 inhabitants in 2010. By 2015 it has merged with Bjuv and lost its status as a separate locality.
