= Elsa Grave =

Swedish novelist, poet and artist

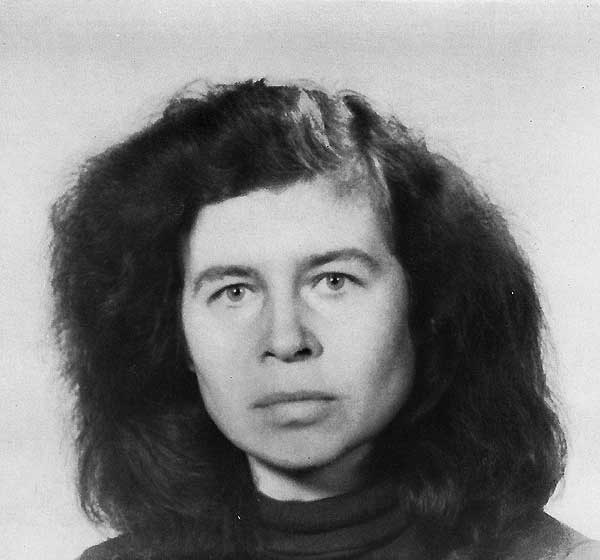
Elsa Grave in the 1950s

Elsa Grave (17 January 1918 – 17 June 2003) was a Swedish novelist, poet and artist.

== Biography ==
Born in 1918, Grave's father, Carl Wolrath Grave, was a mining engineer and her mother, Elsa Regina Järle, a teacher. The family first lived in Gunnarstorp in Scania, moved to Billesholm in 1929 and to Nyvång near Åstorp in 1932. In 1938, Grave studied art in Paris and at Isaac Grünewald's school in Stockholm. In 1942, she graduated in Romance languages and history of art from Lund University.

In 1943, she established herself as an early modernist with her collection Inkräktare (Intruders). Grave developed her own special symbolic style in poems often critical of Western civilization. She gained fame in 1948 when she published her third collection, Bortförklaring (Excuse) in 1948, with the poem Svinborstnatt (Hog's Bristle Night) depicting pigs in a sty which achieve almost human characteristics. A topic she frequently addresses is motherhood, evoking an angry, sorrowful mother painfully performing her tasks, as in Den blåa himlen (The Blue Sky, 1949), especially in the poem Djuphausmakerad (Deep Sea Masquerade). By 1989, when she published Sataneller, many critics had had enough of her cruel litanies, full of anger and despondency.

Grave also wrote a novel, Ariel, in 1955 in which the narrator, Marina, seeks freedom from conventional women's roles. Her play Fläsksabbat (Bacon Sabbath), published in Tre lyriska gräl (1962), is a devastating criticism of Western materialism conveyed by presenting the gluttonous behaviour of a family at Christmastime.

== Works ==
- Inkräktare 1943
- Som en flygande skalbagge 1945
- Bortförklaring 1948
- Den blåa himlen 1949
- Medusan och djävulen 1949
- Avskedsövning 1951
- Påfågeln 1952
- Isskåpet 1952
- 9 elegier 1953
- Ariel 1955
- Lufthav 1956
- Från taggarnas värld 1958
- Luciafirarna 1959
- Positiv försvarspolitik 1959
- Isdityramb 1960
- Höstfärd 1961
- Tre lyriska gräl 1962
- Dikter 1943–1963
- Sphinxen 1963
- Höjdförlust 1965
- Medan vi låg och sov 1966
- Hungersöndag 1967
- Dikter 1968
- Vid nödläge 1969
- Mödrar som vargar 1972
- Avfall. Från och till 1974
- Slutförbannelser 1977
- En tid i paradiset 1981
- Evighetens barnbarn 1982
- För isdemoner är fan en snögubbe 1985
- Sataneller 1989
- Elsa Grave, Dikter, urval 2004
