= Vrams Gunnarstorp Castle =

Castle in Sweden

- Vrams Gunnarstorps slott
- Bjuv Municipality
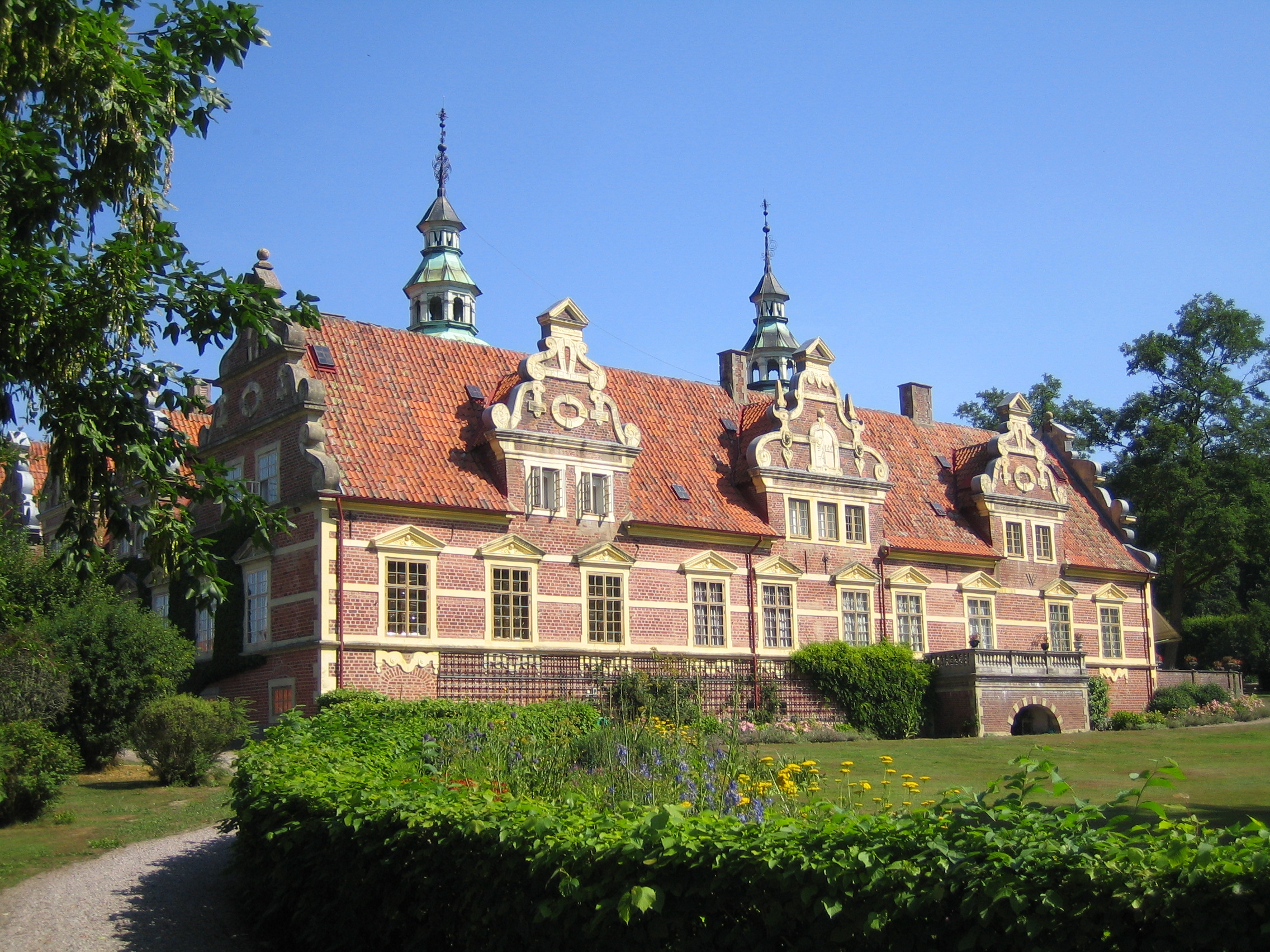
- Vrams Gunnarstorp Castle

Site information
- Type: Castle
- Open to the public: By appointment

Location
- Scania, Sweden
- Location within Skåne
- Coordinates: 56.1036°N 12.9692°E

Site history
- Built: 1633

Vrams Gunnarstorp Castle (Swedish: Vrams Gunnarstorps slott) is a 17th-century castle located in Bjuv Municipality in Skåne County, Sweden. The estate is located in Norra Vrams parish on the south side of Söderåsen in northwestern Skåne.

== History ==
It was originally built by Danish nobleman Jørgen Vind (1593–1644), who had the castle constructed starting during 1633. In 1838, it came into possession of Rudolf Tornérhjelm (1814–1885) who was a member of the Swedish Parliament. It was exchanged by the members of the Berch family in exchange for Össjö Castle and 17 barrels of gold. Current appearance of the castle dates to the mid 1800s. Vrams Gunnarstorp underwent a thorough restoration in the 1850s under the direction of the Danish architect Michael Gottlieb Bindesbøll (1800–1856).

== See also ==
- List of castles in Sweden
