= Gunnarstorp =

- Location within Skåne Location within Sweden
- Coordinates: 56°06′N 12°55′E
- Country: Sweden
- Province: Skåne
- County: Skåne County
- Municipality: Bjuv Municipality

Area
  - Total: 0.42 km^{2} (0.16 sq mi)

Population (31 December 2010)
  - Total: 401
  - Density: 950/km^{2} (2,500/sq mi)
- Time zone: UTC+1 (CET)
  - Summer (DST): UTC+2 (CEST)

Gunnarstorp (Swedish pronunciation: [ˈɡɵ̂nːaʂˌtɔrp]) was a locality situated in Bjuv Municipality, Skåne County, the southernmost province in Sweden.

There were 401 inhabitants in 2010, up from 360 five years earlier. By 2015 it merged with Bjuv and lost its status as a separate locality.

The town grew up around a mine that was sunk in 1910 and worked between 1913 and 1946.
