= Paulina Pancenkov =

Swedish singer

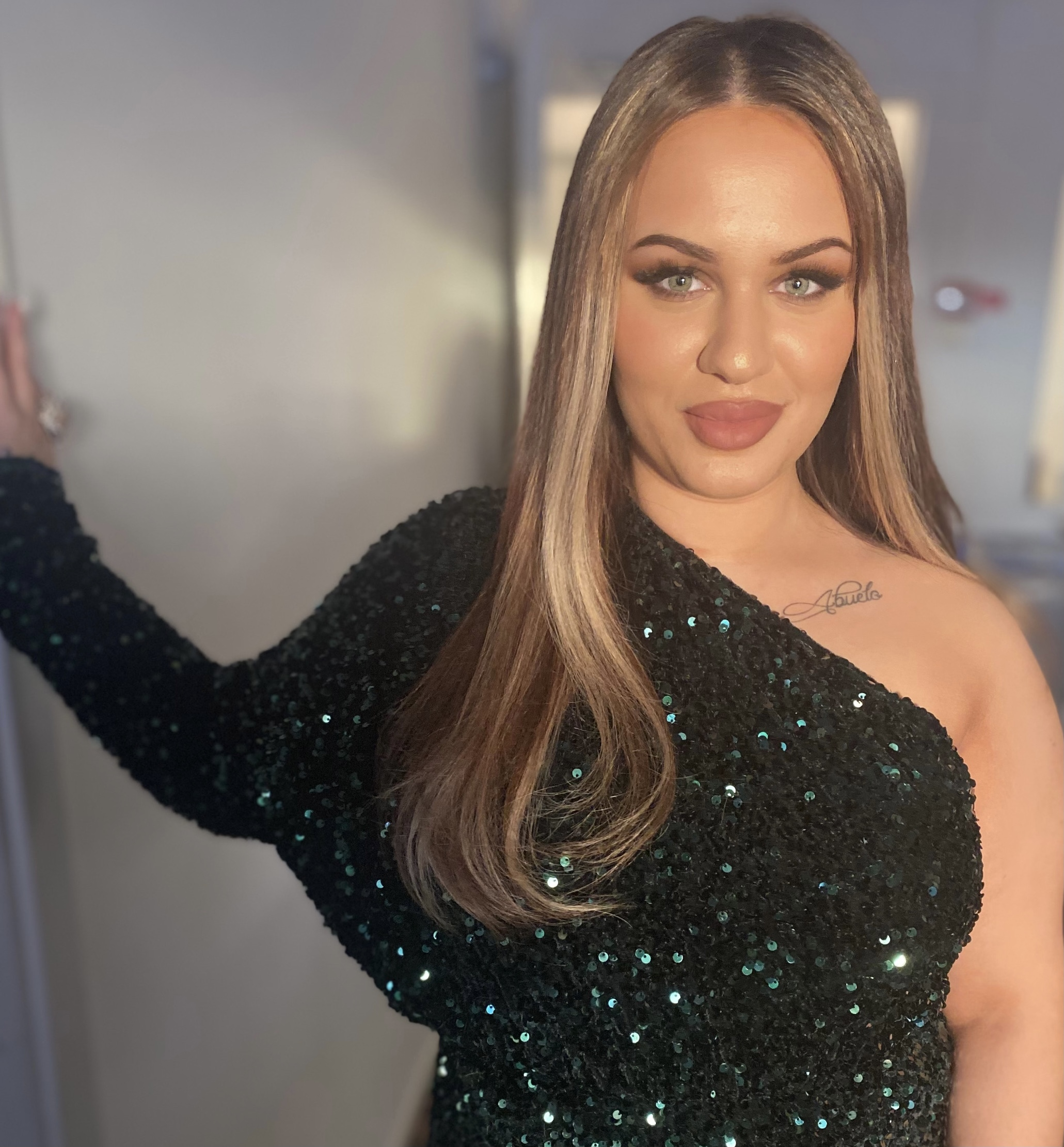
- Paulina Pancenkov in 2020
- Born: 29 November 1999 (age 26); Bjuv, Sweden
- Occupation: Singer

Paulina Pancenkov (born 29 November 1999) is a Swedish singer and finalist in Idol 2020. She grew up in Bjuv. On 27 November, 2020, she along with Nadja Holm made it to the final of the TV4 singing competition Idol 2020. In the final she placed second. She is the sister of singer Suzi P.

Pancenkov competed as a singer in Lilla Melodifestivalen in 2014.
