= Stenestad =

Village in Svalöv Municipality, Sweden

Coordinates: 56°03′N 13°05′E

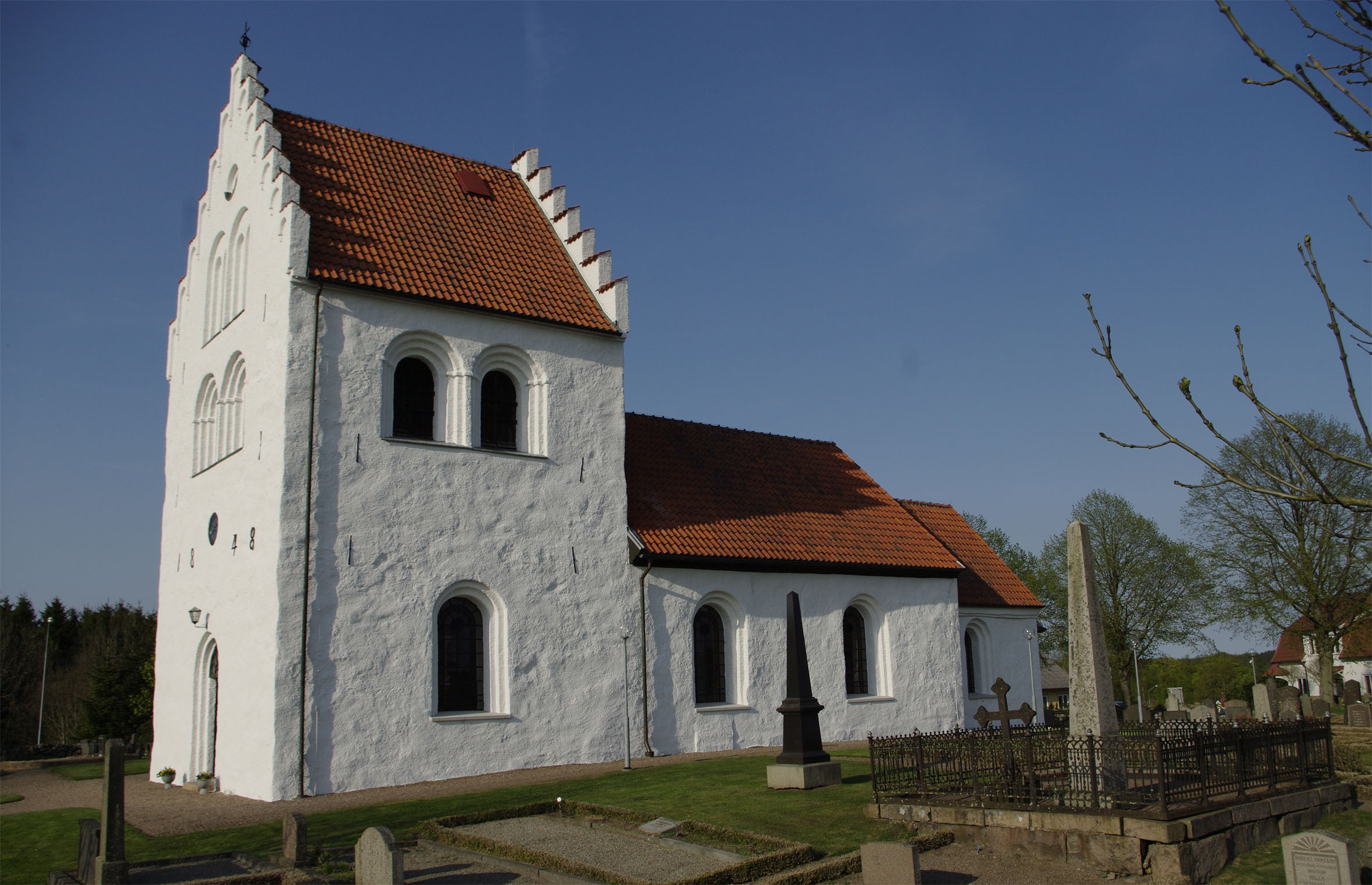
Stenestad Church, Sweden

Stenestad is a village in Svalöv Municipality in southern Sweden. The village has a population of 240 as of 2025. The Norra Vram circuit for the 1933 Swedish Summer Grand Prix went through the village.
