= Röstånga =

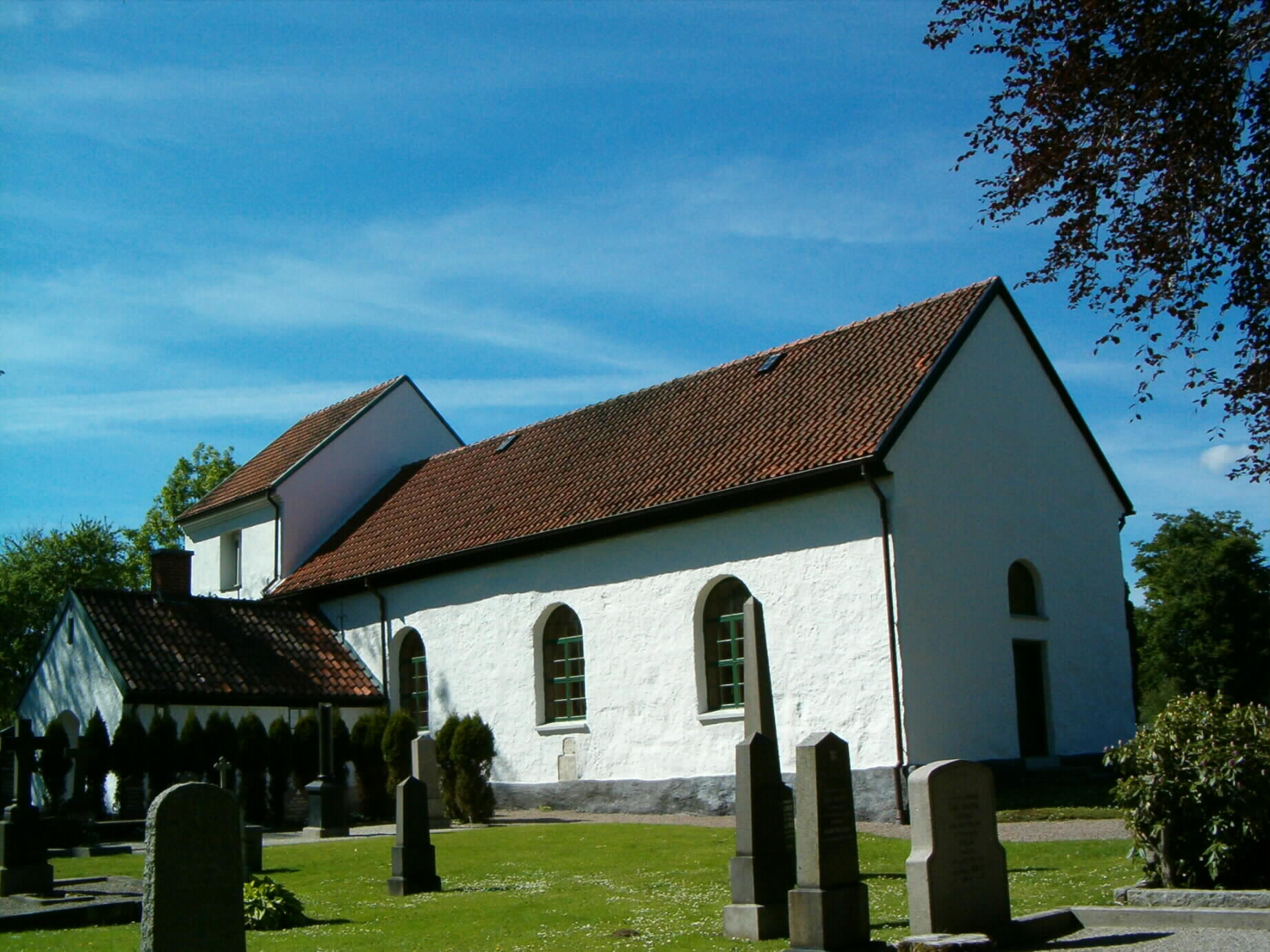
- Röstånga Church

- Location within Skåne Location within Sweden
- Coordinates: 56°00′N 13°17′E
- Country: Sweden
- Province: Skåne
- County: Skåne County
- Municipality: Svalöv Municipality

Area
  - Total: 1.32 km^{2} (0.51 sq mi)

Population (2021-12-31)
  - Total: 1,111
  - Density: 637/km^{2} (1,650/sq mi)
- Time zone: UTC+1 (CET)
  - Summer (DST): UTC+2 (CEST)

Röstånga (Swedish pronunciation: [ˈrø̌ːstɔŋa]) is a locality situated in Svalöv Municipality, Skåne County, Sweden with around 1100 inhabitants.

At Röstånga there is an entrance to the Söderåsen National Park. The main entrance is at Skäralid, 5 km further north. There is also a valley called Nackarpsdalen, at the end of which there is a lake called Odensjön.

To get to Röstånga by public transport, one can take a local train to Stehag, then bus (directions Klippan, Skäralid and Ljungbyhed). There are also bus connections with Svalöv and Teckomatorp.
