= 1933 Swedish Summer Grand Prix =

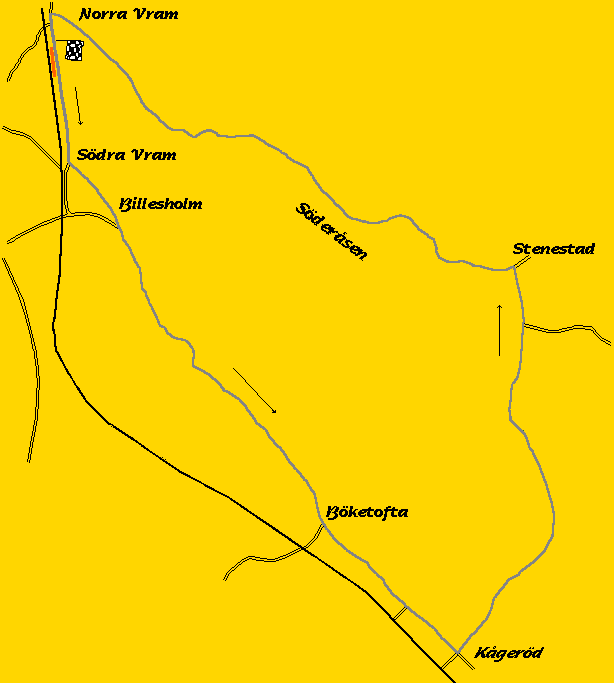
Map of the circuit

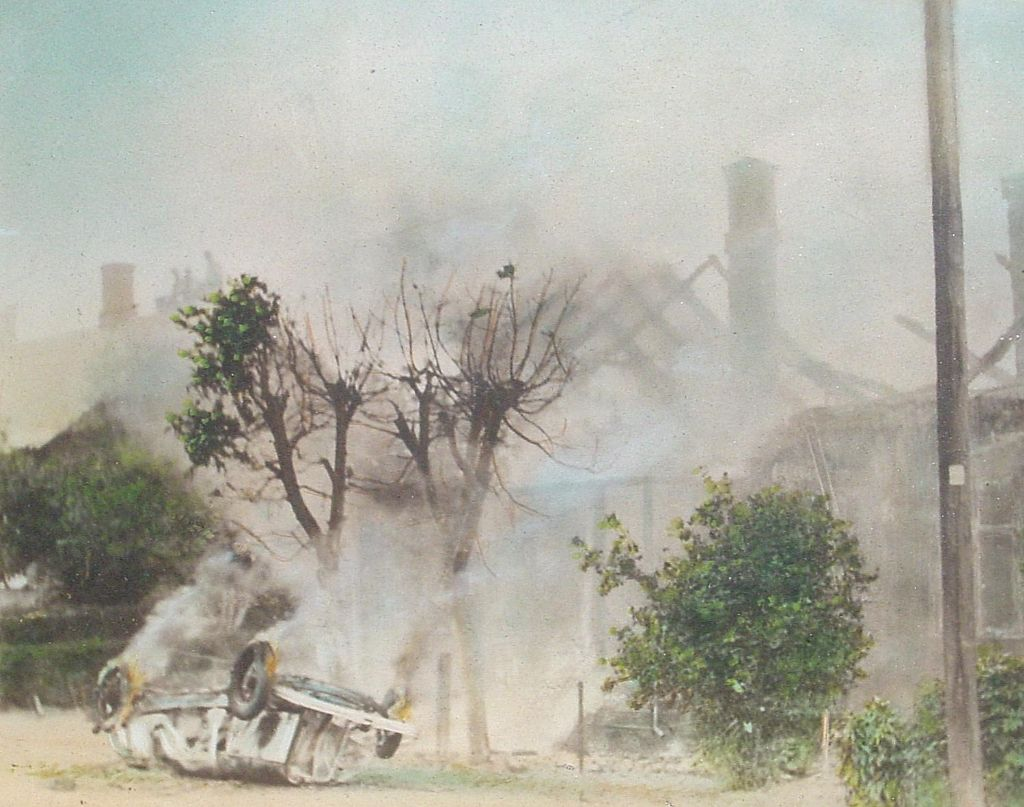

The 1933 Swedish Summer Grand Prix (Swedish: Sveriges sommar-Grand Prix för automobiler) was arranged by the Royal Automobile Club (KAK) and held at 6 August on a 29.7 km (18.5 mi) circuit at Norra Vram. The circuit was made up at regular countryside roads at a place very close to present day closed circuit Ring Knutstorp in Kågeröd. 12 laps were driven, making the distance 356.4 km (221.5 mi). The 10,000 krona prize to the winner was the largest offered yet for any race in Scandinavia.

The lap followed the straight road from Norra Vram south to Södra Vram (now Billesholm) for 1.2 km (0.75 mi) before a part with more turns towards Kågeröd, were the circuit turned sharply left and started to go north-east uphill for many km. At this part the asphalt ended and the circuit continued on gravel roads. When the circuit reached Stenestad there was another sharp left turn and then there was a long, twisty downhill road back to Norra Vram.

Astrid Lindgren was race secretary, and 160 policemen and 60 track marshals worked around the course.

The opening lap saw a seven-car pile-up, set off by the wreck of the Mercedes-Benz SSK of Börje Dahlin, in which several drivers were injured, two seriously, and riding mechanic Erik Lafrenz killed. One of the crashed cars caught fire; it spread to a nearby house, which burned down. The race continued while emergency services attended the scene and the race was eventually won by Antonio Brivio, driving an Alfa Romeo for Scuderia Ferrari. Major racing came to a halt after that.

== Result of the Swedish Summer Grand Prix 1933 ==
Most entrants (as can be seen in the list below) were private entrants.

Place	No.	Driver	Entrant	Car	Laps	Time/status
1	19	(Italy) Antonio Brivio	Scuderia Ferrari	Alfa Romeo Monza 2.6 S-8	12	2h51m55s (124.45 km/h)
2	22	(United States) Whitney Straight	B. Rubin	Maserati 8CM 3.0 S-8	12	2h54m43s
3	3	(Norway) Eugen Bjørnstad	Eugen Bjørnstad	Alfa Romeo Monza 2.3 S-8	12	3h03m43s
4	14	(Finland) Karl Ebb	Karl Ebb	Mercedes-Benz SSK 7.1 S-6	12	3h06m51s
5	10	(Sweden) Åke Johansson	Åke Johansson	Bugatti T37A 1.5 S-4	12	3h16m06s
6	24	(Sweden) Harry Larsson	Harry Larsson	Ford Special 3.6 S-4	12	3h22m51s
7	20	(Sweden) Walter Görtz	Walter Görtz	Ford Special 3.6 S-4	12	4h12m27s
DNF	26	(Denmark) Morian Hansen	Morian Hansen	Ford Special 3.6 V-8	11	engine failure
DNF	18	(Sweden) Martin Strömberg	Martin Strömberg	Chevrolet Special 3.2	7	engine failure
DNF	9	(Sweden) Otto Wihlborg	Otto Wihlborg	Bugatti T35B 2.3 S-8	6	crash
DNF	27	(Denmark) Poul Tholstrup	Poul Tholstrup	Ford Special 3.6 V-8	5	steering
DNF	8	(Sweden) Helmer Carlsson	Bertil Carlsson	De Soto Special 3.4 S-8	4	clutch
DNF	6	(Sweden) Carl-Gustaf Johansson	C-G. Johansson	Ford Special 3.6 V-8	4	valves
DNF	4	(Sweden) Axel Johnsson	Axel Johnsson	Bugatti T43 2.3 S-8	4	–
DNF	25	(Sweden) Tore Wistedt	Tore Wistedt	MG C 0.7 S-4	0	clutch
DNF	15	(Monaco) Louis Chiron	Scuderia CC	Alfa Romeo P3 2.6 S-8	0	crash
DNF	12	(Sweden) PeWe Widengren	P-V. Widengren	Alfa Romeo Monza 2.3 S-8	0	crash
DNF	11	(Sweden) John Forsberg	John Forsberg	Ford Special 3.6 V-8	0	crash
DNF	7	(Finland) Asser Wallenius	Asser Wallenius	Ford Special 3.6 V-8	0	crash
DNF	2	(Sweden) Olle Bennström	S. O. Bennström	Ford Special 3.6 V-8	0	crash
DNF	1	(Sweden) Börje Dahlin	Börje Dahlin	Mercedes-Benz SSK 7.1 S-6	0	crash
DNF	23	(Sweden) Oscar Wickberg	Oscar Wickberg	Bugatti T35 2.0 S-8	0	crash
DNS	5	(Sweden) Bo Lindh	Bo Lindh	Hudson Special 4.9	–	engine failure
DNA	16	(Sweden) Karl-Gustav Sundstedt	K-G Sundstedt	Bugatti T35B 2.3 S-8	–	illness
DNS	17	(Finland) S.P.J. Keinänen	S.P.J. Keinänen	Chrysler Special 5.1 S-6	–	engine failure
DNA	28	(Italy) Mario Umberto Borzacchini	Scuderia Ferrari	Alfa Romeo Monza 2.6 S-8	–	illness
DNS	21	(Sweden) Gösta Askergren	Gösta Askergren	Chevrolet Special 3.2	–	crash

Fastest lap: Brivio – 13m51s – 128.7 km/h (80.0 mph)

Preceded by None	Swedish Grand Prix; 1933	Succeeded by 1949 Swedish Summer Grand Prix
