= Idol 2020 (Sweden) =

- Season 2020
- Hosted by: Pär Lernström
- Judges: Kishti Tomita; Alexander Kronlund; Nikki Amini; Anders Bagge
- Winner: Nadja Holm
- Runner-up: Paulina Pancenkov
- Finals venue: The Idol Studio in Spånga, Stockholm, Sweden

Release
- Original network: TV4
- Original release: 17 August – 4 December 2020

Season chronology
- ← Previous; Season 2019 Next → Season 2021

Idol 2020 was the sixteenth season of the Swedish Idol series. Like earlier seasons, the season was broadcast on TV4. New for this year is that one person got to audition for this season already during the final of Idol 2019 in Globen, Rebecka Assio made it through to the final audition in Stockholm.

On 22 September, contestant Caspar Camitz tested positive for COVID-19 and would miss the first Top 13 performance. On 25 September, just a few hours away from the airing of the first Friday show, Affe Hagström, Nadja Holm and Herman Silow also tested positive for the virus, which led to changes to the week's show. The contestants therefore performed their songs from their suites at their hotel. Affe Hagström, who was going to sing the song "Sun Is Shining (Band of Gold)" by Vargas & Lagola, made the decision to not perform that week.

On 26 September, it was announced that contestant Indra Elg, who just had left the competition one day earlier, also tested positive for COVID-19, just like Caspar Camitz, Affe Hagström, Nadja Holm and Herman Silow.

On 16 October, just a few hours away from airing the fourth Friday show, contestant Affe Hagström made the decision to leave the competition.

On 12 November, it was announced that, because of COVID-19, the final would not be held in the Globen Arena on 4 December, like it has been since 2007, and would instead be held in the Idol Studio in Spånga. It is the first time since 2006 that the final has been held in the Idol Studio.

Nadja Holm and Paulina Pancenkov made it to the final on 4 December. Nadja Holm was the winner. It was also Nikki Amini's last season as a judge member of the show, which means that she would no longer be a part of the show. She was later replaced by Katia Mosally, who has been a judge member since the season of 2021 and onwards.

== Top 22 ==
=== From Stockholm auditions ===
- Affe Hagström, Värmdö
- Caspar Camitz, Norrtälje
- Ella Hedström, Täby
- Gabriel Abdulahad, Norrköping
- Herman Silow, Stockholm
- Isabella Ohlsson, Stockholm
- Kong Phan, Stockholm
- Linnéa Samuelsson, Tyresö
- Nova Luther, Stockholm
- Simon Karlsson, Stockholm
- Tara Naderpour, Upplands Väsby

=== From Gothenburg auditions ===
- Edvin Hakimzadeh, Borås
- Felix Enghult, Gothenburg
- Indra Elg, Växjö
- Melissa Lund, Äspered
- Rebecka Assio, Falköping (did not audition in Gothenburg, but took part in the final part of the auditions in the city)
- Tess Gustafsson, Landvetter

=== From Sundsvall auditions ===
- Maya Arctaedius, Umeå
- Nadja Holm, Piteå

=== From Helsingborg auditions ===
- Mattias Nederman, Skurup
- Niklas Hultberg, Karlskrona
- Paulina Pancenkov, Bjuv

== Elimination chart ==
Stage:		Qualification Week						Weekly Finals											Final
Date:		14/9	15/9	16/9	17/9	WC	18/9	25/9	2/10	9/10	16/10	23/11	30/10	6/11	13/11	20/11	27/11		4/12
Place	Contestant	Result																	
1	Nadja Holm		1																Winner
2	Paulina Pancenkov					WC													Runner-up
3	Caspar Camitz			1														Out.	
4	Nova Luther		2														Out.		
5	Simon Karlsson			2												Out.			
6	Herman Silow					WC									Out.				
7	Ella Hedström					WC								Out.					
8	Niklas Hultberg	2											Out.						
9	Mattias Nederman					WC					Out.								
10	Affe Hagström	1																	
11	Maya Arctaedius				1					Out.									
12	Gabriel Abdulahad					WC			Out.										
13	Indra Elg					WC		Out.											
14	Tess Gustafsson				2		Out.												
Top 22	Felix Enghult					Out.													
Top 22	Kong Phan					Out.													
Top 22	Isabella Ohlsson					Out.													
Top 22	Linnéa Samuelsson					Out.													
Top 22	Rebecka Assio					Out.													
Top 22	Edvin Hakimzadeh					Out.													
Top 22	Melissa Lund					Out.													
Top 22	Tara Naderpour					Out.													

Legend
1st	Safe	Not Safe / Bottom 2 / Bottom 3	Wild Card	Withdrew	Judges Save	Knocked Out

Top 13	Top 22	Still in running, did not perform	Will appear at this stage	Stage not reached

=== Top 12 (originally Top 13) - This is Me ===
Order	Contestant	Song	Result
1	Herman Silow	"Get Lucky"	Safe
2	Indra Elg	"Just a Girl"	Eliminated
3	Caspar Camitz	"Watermelon Sugar"	Safe
4	Gabriel Abdulahad	"Dance Monkey"	Safe
5	Paulina Pancenkov	"Side to Side"	Safe
6	Niklas Hultberg	"Chandelier"	Bottom two
7	Ella Hedström	"Välkommen in"	Safe
8	Mattias Nederman	"In Your Eyes"	Safe
9	Nova Luther	"I Wish"	Safe
10	Maya Arctaedius	"Sorry Not Sorry"	Safe
11	Simon Karlsson	"The Cave"	Safe
12	Nadja Holm	"Freedom"	Safe

Affe Hagström did not perform that week.

=== Top 12 - On Swedish ===
Order	Contestant	Song	Result
1	Ella Hedström	"Jag blir hellre jagad av vargar"	Bottom two
2	Maya Arctaedius	"Passa dig"	Safe
3	Herman Silow	"Ta mig tillbaka"	Safe
4	Simon Karlsson	"Din tid kommer"	Safe
5	Nadja Holm	"Det bästa kanske inte hänt än"	Safe
6	Gabriel Abdulahad	"Lakan"	Eliminated
7	Mattias Nederman	"Tusen bitar"	Safe
8	Nova Luther	"Så som i himlen"	Safe
9	Caspar Camitz	"Strövtåg i hembygden"	Safe
10	Niklas Hultberg	"Svag"	Safe
11	Affe Hagström	"Vintersaga"	Safe
12	Paulina Pancenkov	"Säg mig var du står"	Safe

=== Top 11 - My Idol ===
Order	Contestant	Song	Result
1	Nadja Holm	"Show Me How You Burlesque"	Safe
2	Mattias Nederman	"In the Ghetto"	Safe
3	Nova Luther	"I Wanna Dance with Somebody (Who Loves Me)"	Safe
4	Paulina Pancenkov	"All by Myself"	Safe
5	Niklas Hultberg	"Bohemian Rhapsody"	Safe
6	Ella Hedström	"Aldrig mer vara du"	Bottom two
7	Herman Silow	"Stayin' Alive"	Safe
8	Affe Hagström	"Lost"	Safe
9	Maya Arctaedius	"Effortless"	Eliminated
10	Simon Karlsson	"If I Ain't Got You"	Safe
11	Caspar Camitz	"Go Your Own Way"	Safe

=== Top 9 - Winnersongs ===
Order	Contestant	Song	Result
1	Paulina Pancenkov	"Survivor"	Safe
2	Herman Silow	"Crazy in Love"	Safe
3	Niklas Hultberg	"We Are Young"	Bottom two
4	Caspar Camitz	"Fallin'"	Safe
5	Ella Hedström	"Bad Guy"	Safe
6	Nadja Holm	"Finesse"	Safe
7	Mattias Nederman	"Stay with Me"	Eliminated
8	Simon Karlsson	"When You Were Young"	Safe
9	Nova Luther	"Dancing on My Own"	Safe

Affe Hagström withdrew from the competition that week.

=== Top 8 (First Week) - 80s & 90s ===
Order	Contestant	Song	Result
1	Simon Karlsson	"Iris"	Safe
2	Nova Luther	"I'm Outta Love"	Safe
3	Ella Hedström	"Vill ha dej"	Judges save
4	Nadja Holm	"Thunderstruck"	Safe
5	Caspar Camitz	"What's Love Got to Do with It"	Safe
6	Herman Silow	"Song 2"	Safe
7	Paulina Pancenkov	"Genie in a Bottle"	Safe
8	Niklas Hultberg	"You're the Voice"	Bottom two

=== Top 8 (Second Week) - Viewers Choice ===
Order	Contestant	Song	Result
1	Niklas Hultberg	"Heroes"	Eliminated
2	Nadja Holm	"Listen"	Safe
3	Simon Karlsson	"Hold Back the River"	Safe
4	Herman Silow	"This Love"	Bottom two
5	Ella Hedström	"Rosa himmel"	Safe
6	Paulina Pancenkov	"Stone Cold"	Safe
7	Caspar Camitz	"Hallelujah"	Safe
8	Nova Luther	"Flashlight"	Safe

=== Top 7 - Back to Top ===
Order	Contestant	Song	Result
1	Paulina Pancenkov	"Bang Bang"	Safe
2	Caspar Camitz	"Cold Train" (Original Song)	Safe
3	Ella Hedström	"Eloise"	Eliminated
4	Nova Luther	"Runnin' (Lose It All)"	Safe
5	Herman Silow	"Older" (Original Song)	Bottom two
6	Nadja Holm	"Something's Got a Hold on Me"	Safe
7	Simon Karlsson	"Crossing the Waters" (Original Song)	Safe

=== Top 6 - Powerwomans & Duets ===
Order	Contestant	Song	Result
1	Nadja Holm	"It's Raining Men"	Safe
2	Simon Karlsson	"Blåmärkshårt (Mi Amor)"	Bottom two
3	Nova Luther	"River"	Safe
4	Casper Camitz	"Killing Me Softly with His Song"	Safe
5	Paulina Pancenkov	"Nobody's Perfect"	Safe
6	Herman Sillow	"La vie en rose"	Eliminated

Order	Duet	Song
1	Paulina Pancenkov & Herman Silow	"If the World Was Ending"
2	Nadja Holm & Simon Karlsson	"Rewrite the Stars"
3	Caspar Camitz & Nova Luther	"I Knew You Were Waiting (For Me)"

=== Top 5 – Love ===
Order	Act	First song	Order	Second song	Result
1	Nova Luther	"Without You"	6	"Mirrors"	Safe
2	Simon Karlsson	"To Noise Making (Sing)"	7	"Precis som du vill"	Eliminated
3	Caspar Camitz	"When We Were on Fire"	8	"A Song For You"	Safe
4	Paulina Pancenkov	"A Song for You"	9	"Kärleksvisan"	Safe
5	Nadja Holm	"Love On Top"	10	"I (Who Have Nothing)"	Safe

=== Top 4 – Semifinal: Jurys Choice & Free Choice ===
Order	Act	Jurys Choice song	Result	Order	Free Choice song	Result
1	Casper Camitz	"River Deep – Mountain High"	Safe	5	"Bang Bang"	Eliminated
2	Nadja Holm	"Never Forget You"	Safe	6	"Greedy"	Safe
3	Paulina Pancenkov	"And I Am Telling You I'm Not Going"	Safe	7	"Addicted to You"	Safe
4	Nova Luther	"Blow Your Mind (Mwah)"	Eliminated	N/A (Already Eliminated)		

in this semifinal will 2 acts leave the competition.

=== Top 2 – Final: Free Choice, Da Capo & Winner's Single ===
Order	Act	Da Capo Song	Order	Free Choice Song	Order	Winner's Single	Result
1	Paulina Pancenkov	"Side to Side"	3	Hurt"	5	"(Better Get) Used To Me"	Runner-up
2	Nadja Holm	"Freedom"	4	"Never Enough"	6	"(Better Get) Used To Me"	Winner
