= Kågeröd =

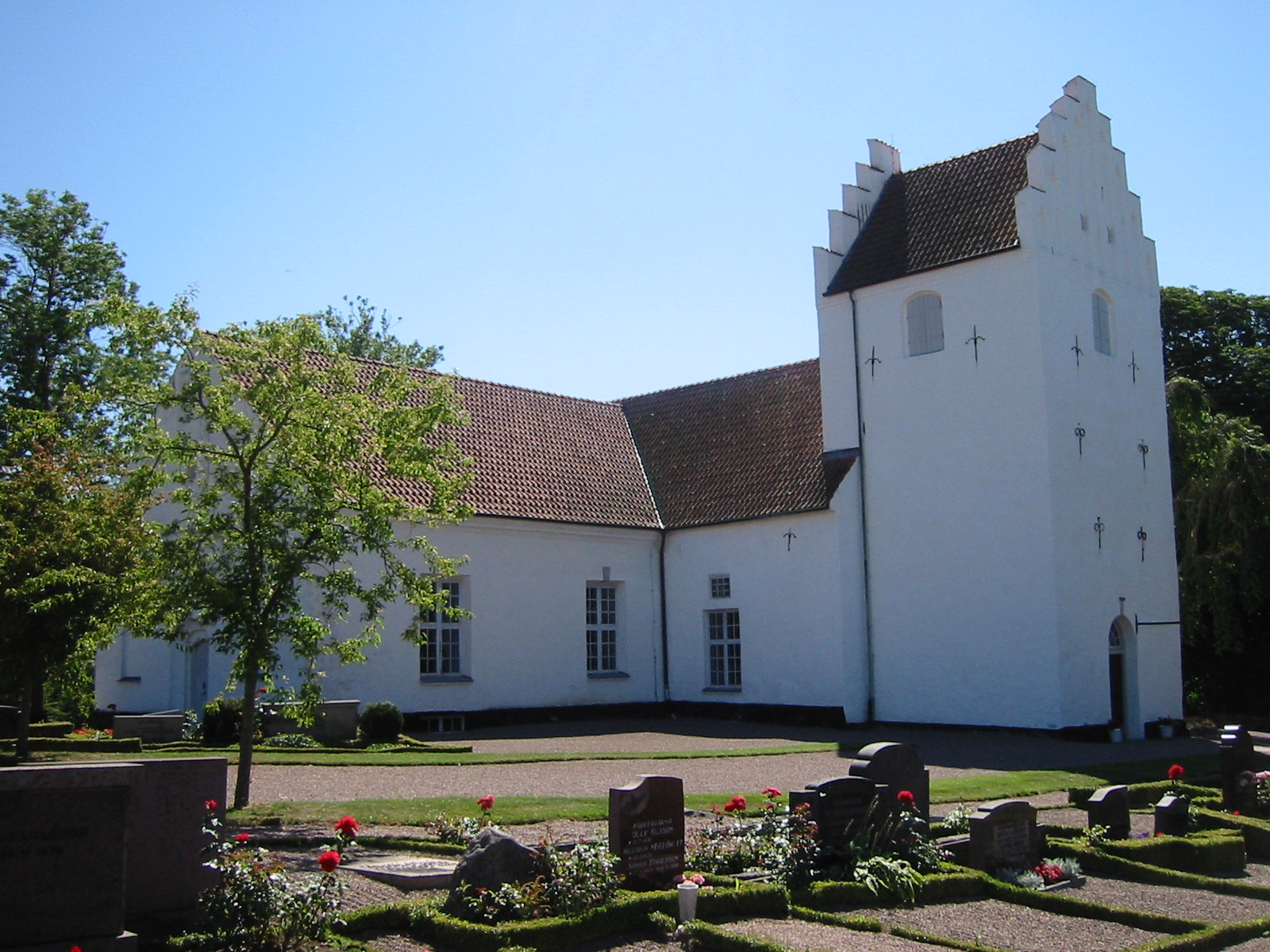
- Kågeröd Church

- Location within Skåne Location within Sweden
- Coordinates: 56°01′N 13°06′E
- Country: Sweden
- Province: Skåne
- County: Skåne County
- Municipality: Svalöv Municipality

Area
  - Total: 1.61 km^{2} (0.62 sq mi)

Population (31 December 2010)
  - Total: 1,446
  - Density: 897/km^{2} (2,320/sq mi)
- Time zone: UTC+1 (CET)
  - Summer (DST): UTC+2 (CEST)

Kågeröd is a locality situated in Svalöv Municipality, Skåne County, Sweden with 1,446 inhabitants in 2010.

The permanent motor circuit Ring Knutstorp is situated at Kågeröd and the Norra Vram road circuit of the 1933 Swedish Summer Grand Prix went through the village.

== Sports ==
The following sports clubs are located in Kågeröd:

- Kågeröds BoIF
