= Indra Elg =

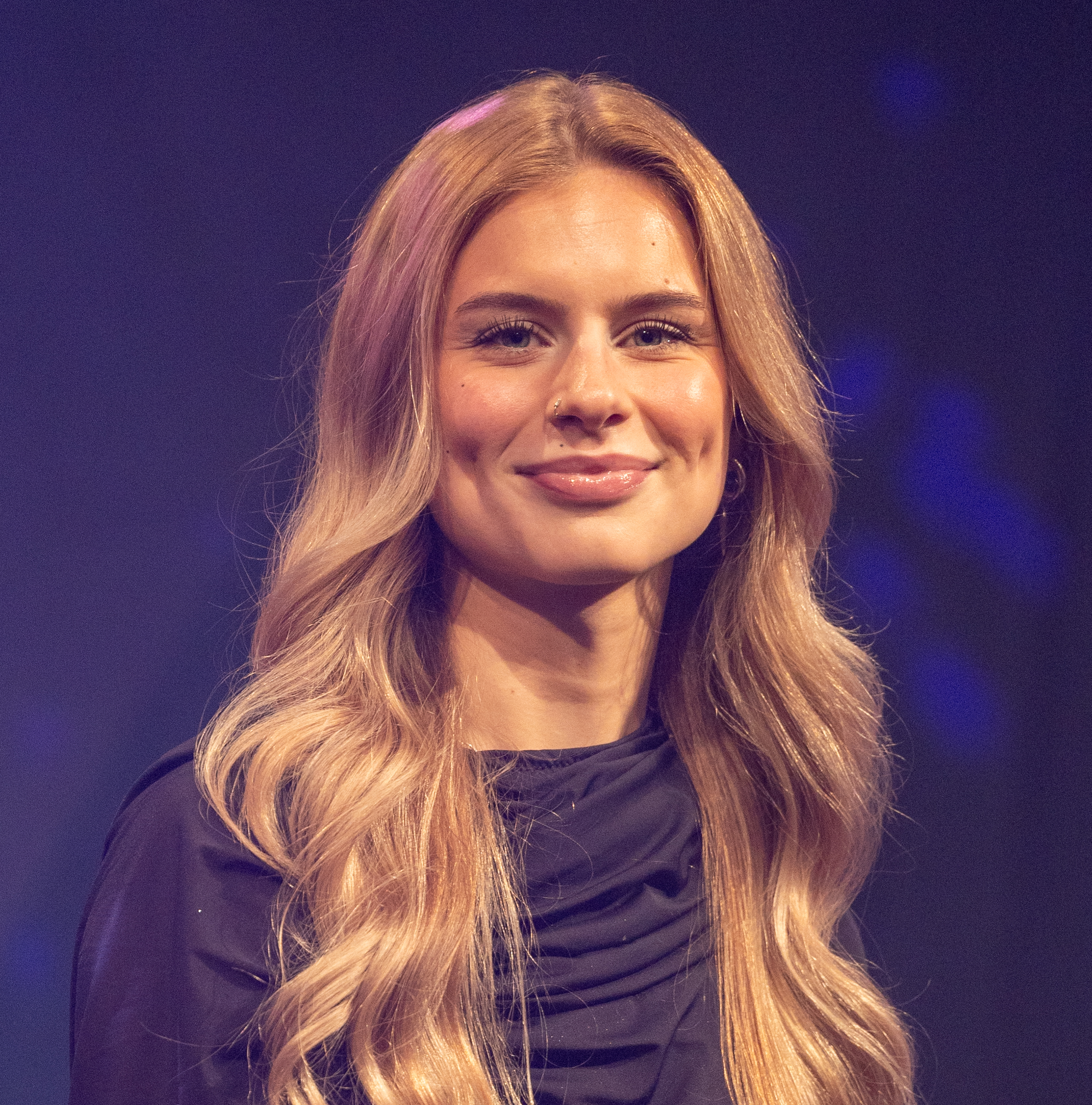
- Indra Elg in 2026

Background information
- Also known as: Indra
- Born: Indra Louise Blümchen Elg; 15 September 2003 (age 22); Växjö, Sweden
- Occupation: Singer

Indra Louise Blümchen Elg (15 September 2003) is a Swedish singer. She was a contestant in Idol 2020, which was broadcast on TV4. She was the first to be eliminated in the Top 13. Because of COVID-19 infection she performed from a hotel room in isolation. In Melodifestivalen 2026 she performed the song ”Beautiful Lie”.

== Discography ==
=== Singles ===
Title	Year	Peak chart positions	Album
Title	Year	SWE	Album
"Beautiful Lie"	2026	36	Non-album singles
