= Ekeby, Bjuv =

Ekeby
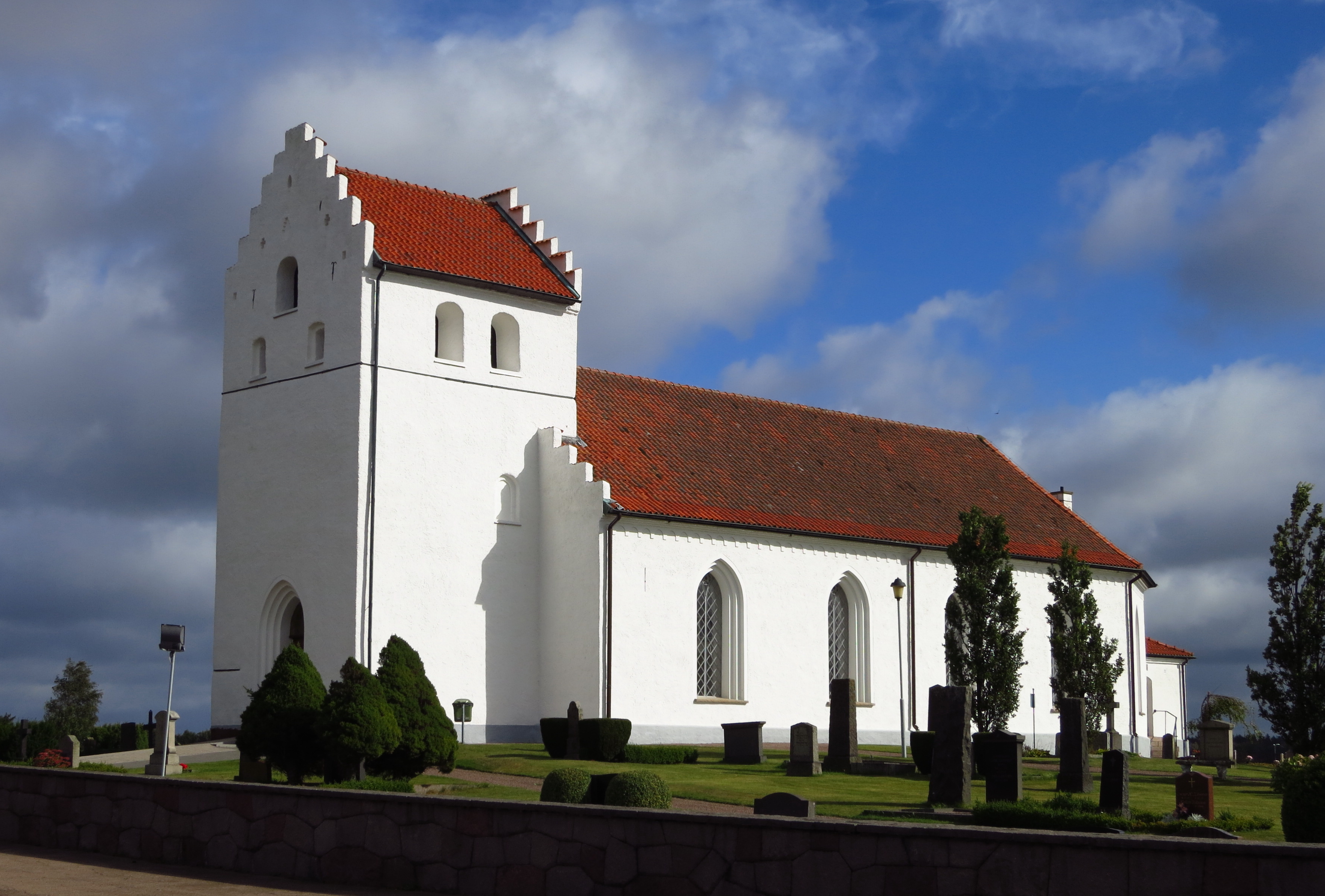
- Ekeby Church

- Location in Bjuv Municipality in Skåne County Ekeby (Sweden)
- Coordinates: 56°01′N 12°57′E
- Country: Sweden
- Province: Skåne
- County: Skåne County
- Municipality: Bjuv Municipality

Area
  - Total: 3.03 km^{2} (1.17 sq mi)

Population (31 December 2010)
  - Total: 3,230
  - Density: 1,064/km^{2} (2,760/sq mi)
- Time zone: UTC+1 (CET)
  - Summer (DST): UTC+2 (CEST)

Ekeby is a locality situated in Bjuv Municipality, Skåne County, Sweden with 3,230 inhabitants in 2010.
