= Bjuv Church =

- Bjuvs kyrka
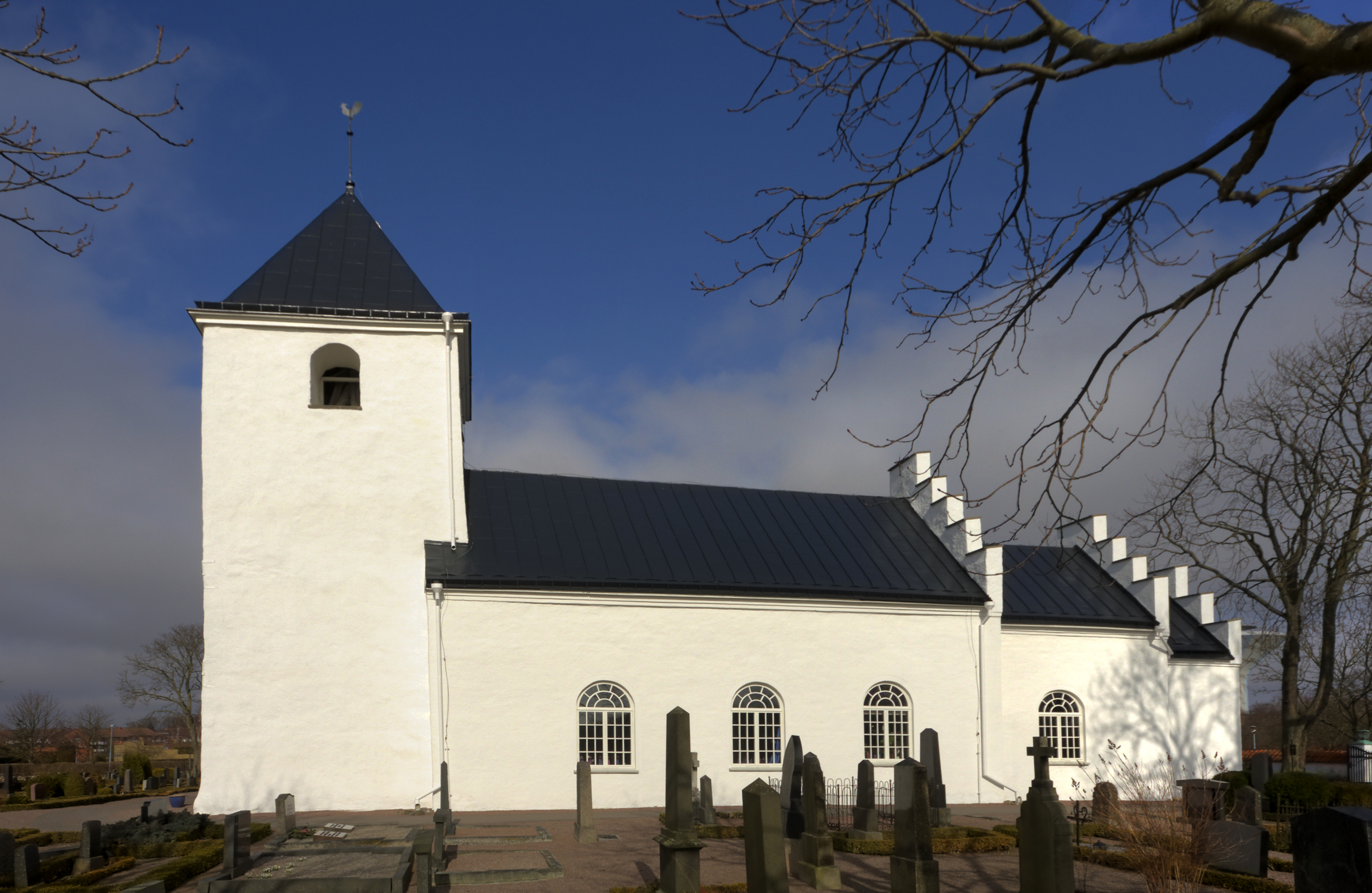
- Bjuv Church

- 56°04′37″N 12°55′36″E
- Country: Sweden
- Denomination: Church of Sweden

Bjuv Church (Swedish: Bjuvs kyrka) is a medieval church in Bjuv in the province of Skåne, Sweden.

== History ==
The church in Bjuv dates from the late 12th century and originally consisted of a nave, chancel and an apse. The church tower was added during the 13th century, but largely rebuilt during the 18th century. During the 15th century the original ceiling was replaced with the currently visible vaults. In 1800 a single transept was added, facing north, and in 1867 the apse was demolished and replaced by the current structure housing the vestry.

== Description ==
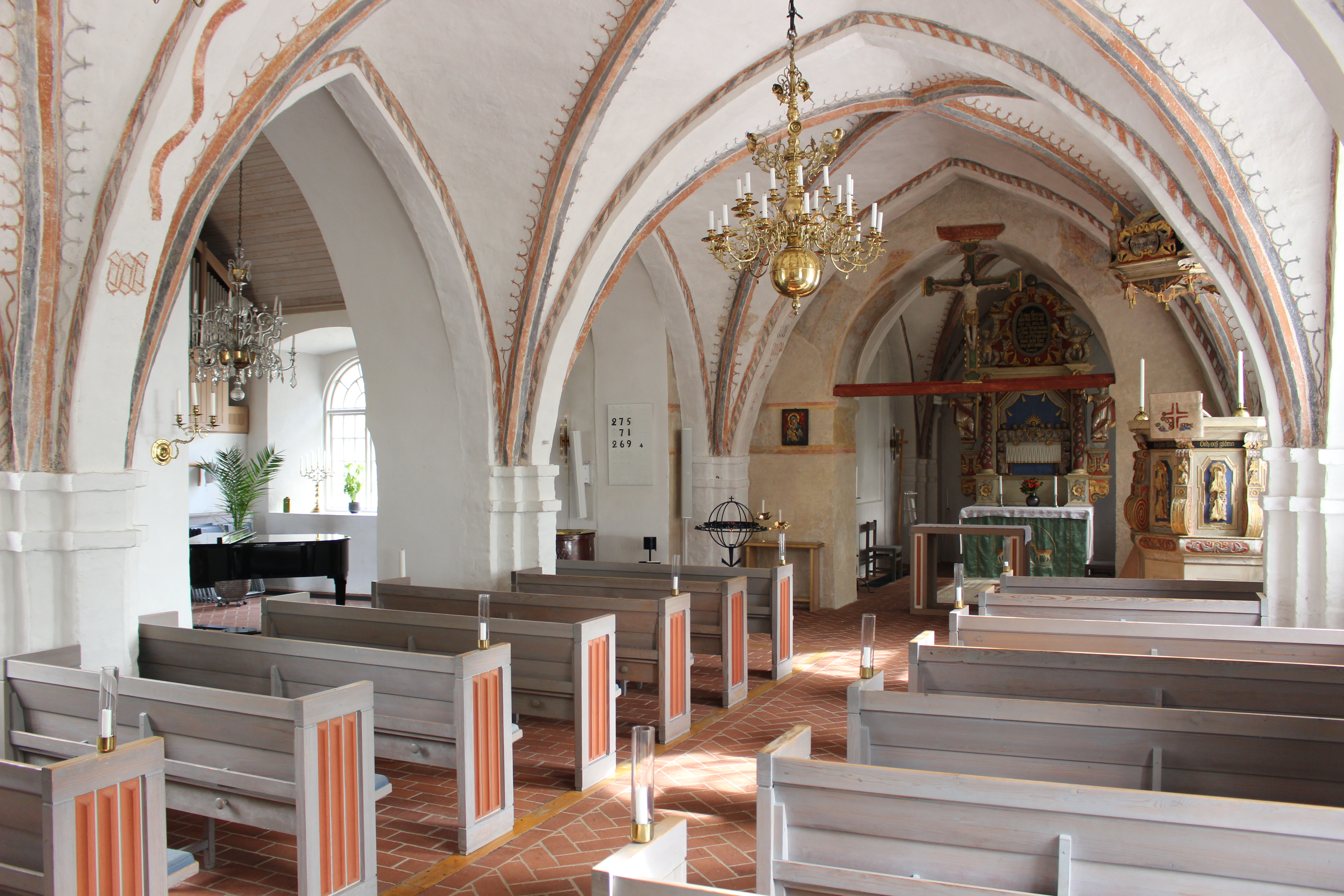
View of the interior

The church contains medieval murals from two periods: the vaults in the nave were decorated when they were built in the 15th century; in addition, the wall that separates the chancel from the nave contains fragmentary remains of murals from the 13th century. The altarpiece and pulpit are both from 1756 and made by Johan Ullberg. The church has a rood cross from around 1500, and two baptismal fonts, one of which is medieval.
