= Kågeröds BoIF =

Swedish football club

- Full name: Kågeröds Boll och Idrottsförening
- Nickname: KBIF
- Founded: 1934
- Ground: Brahevallen; Kågeröd; Sweden
- Chairman: Magnus Olofsson
- Head coach: Robin Sääski
- Coach: Richard Nennebrandt, Jörgen "Kokko" Olsson
- League: Division 5
Home colours

Kågeröds BoIF is a Swedish football club located in Kågeröd.

== Background ==
Kågeröds BoIF currently plays in Division 5 Nordvästra Skåne which is the seventh tier of Swedish football. They play their home matches at the Brahevallen in Kågeröd.

The club is affiliated to Skånes Fotbollförbund.

== Season to season ==
Season	Level	Division	Section	Position	Movements
2005	Tier 5	Division 4	Skåne Nordvästra	5th	
2006*	Tier 6	Division 4	Skåne Västra	3rd	Promotion Playoffs
2007	Tier 6	Division 4	Skåne Mellersta	7th	
2008	Tier 6	Division 4	Skåne Norra	4th	
2009	Tier 6	Division 4	Skåne Norra	8th	
2010	Tier 6	Division 4	Skåne Nordvästra	7th	
2011	Tier 6	Division 4	Skåne Nordvästra	12th	Relegated

* League restructuring in 2006 resulted in a new division being created at Tier 3 and subsequent divisions dropping a level.
