= Nadja Holm =

Swedish singer and winner of Idol 2020 (born 1997)

- Born: Nadja Kasanesh Holm; 10 October 1997 (age 28); Ethiopia
- Occupation: Singer

Nadja Kasanesh Holm, (born 10 October 1997) is a Swedish singer and winner of Idol 2020. She was born in Ethiopia and grew up in Roknäs outside of Piteå. On 27 November 2020, she along with Paulina Pancenkov made it to the final of the TV4 singing competition Idol 2020. Nadja Holm won the final.

In 2022, Holm played the leading role in the musical "The bodyguard – The musical", at Chinateatern in Stockholm.

== Discography ==
=== Singles ===
Title	Year	Peak chart positions	Album
Title	Year	SWE	Album
"(Better Get) Used to me"	2020	—	Non-album singles
