= Svalöv Municipality =

Svalöv Municipality Svalövs kommun
- Municipality
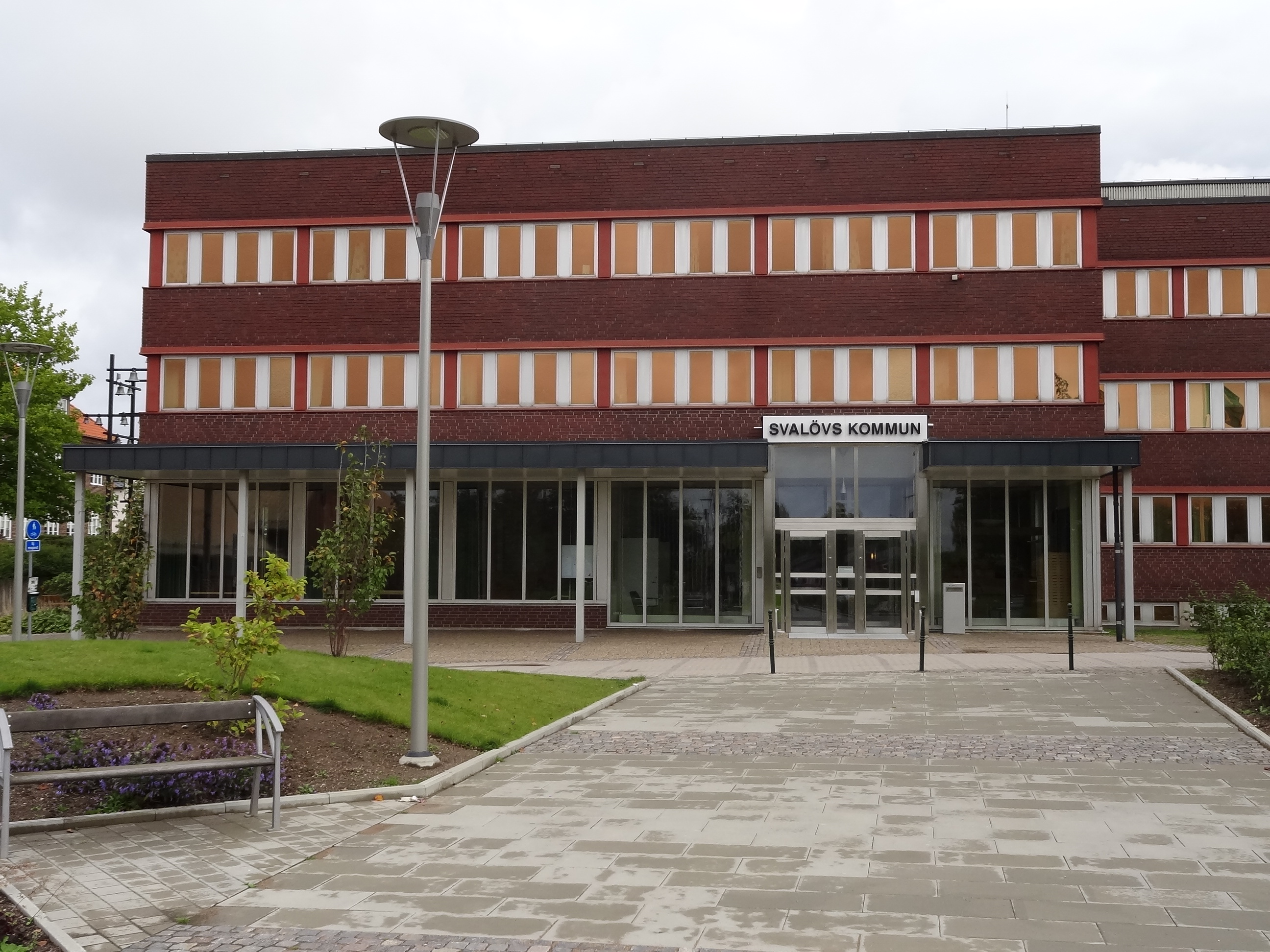
- Municipal Hall

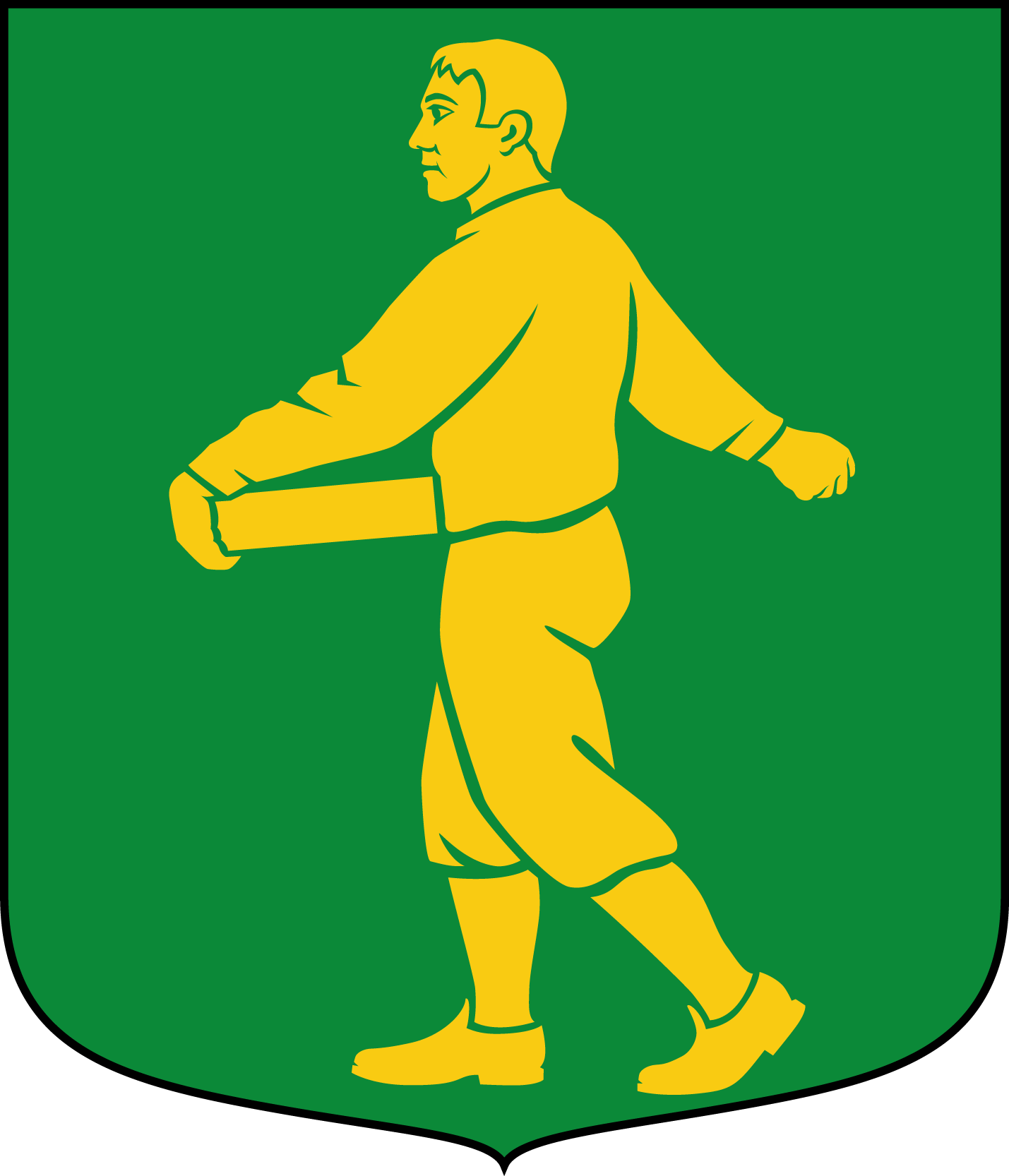
- Flag Coat of arms Logotype

- Coordinates: 55°55′N 13°07′E
- Country: Sweden
- County: Skåne County
- Seat: Svalöv

Government
  - Mayor: Teddy Nilsson (Sweden Democrats)

Area
  - Total: 388.62 km^{2} (150.05 sq mi)
  - Land: 387.3 km^{2} (149.5 sq mi)
  - Water: 1.32 km^{2} (0.51 sq mi)
- Area as of 1 January 2014.

Population (30 June 2025)
  - Total: 14,402
  - Density: 37.19/km^{2} (96.31/sq mi)
- Time zone: UTC+1 (CET)
  - Summer (DST): UTC+2 (CEST)
- ISO 3166 code: SE
- Province: Scania
- Municipal code: 1214
- Website: www.svalov.se

Svalöv Municipality (Swedish: Svalövs kommun) is a municipality in Skåne County in southern Sweden. Its seat is located in the town Svalöv.

The local government reform of 1952 grouped the 15 original entities into six larger municipalities. In two steps, 1969 and 1971 they were amalgamated to form the present municipality.

The most common housing category is one-family houses.

There are local pågatåg trains connecting Teckomatorp, in the south of the municipality, with Malmö, Lund and Helsingborg. To get to the town of Svalöv, one can take a bus (approximately 15 minutes) from Teckomatorp.

The villages Röstånga, Kågeröd, Teckomatorp, Svalöv itself and parts of Söderåsen National Park are located in the municipality. The villages are all connected via local buses.

Knutstorp Castle is situated in the municipality along with the Ring Knutstorp race track. The famous astronomer Tycho Brahe was born there.

== Urban areas ==
There are 6 urban areas (also called a Tätort or locality) in Svalöv Municipality.

In the table they are listed according to the size of the population as of December 31, 2005. The municipal seat is in bold characters.

#	Locality	Population
1	**Svalöv**	3,344
2	Teckomatorp	1,644
3	Kågeröd	1,413
4	Billeberga	948
5	Röstånga	846
6	Tågarp	434

== Demographics ==
This is a demographic table based on Svalöv Municipality's electoral districts in the 2022 Swedish general election sourced from SVT's election platform, in turn taken from SCB official statistics.

In total there were 14,398 residents, including 10,158 Swedish citizens of voting age. 38.7% voted for the left coalition and 59.6% for the right coalition. Indicators are in percentage points except population totals and income.

Location	Residents	Citizen adults	Left vote	Right vote	Employed	Swedish parents	Foreign heritage	Income SEK	Degree
Location			%	%					
Billeberga-Tågarp	2,335	1,689	35.5	62.7	82	81	19	26,378	37
Kågeröd-Stenestad	2,337	1,709	33.7	65.0	81	86	14	25,657	33
Röstånga - Konga-Ask	1,920	1,422	42.0	56.6	80	84	16	25,042	44
Svalöv N	1,888	1,285	40.0	57.8	74	65	35	22,747	30
Svalöv V	1,741	1,262	36.8	61.6	87	79	21	27,053	34
Svalöv Ö	1,521	947	44.8	51.5	71	64	36	20,928	27
Teckomatorp-Norrvidinge	2,656	1,844	40.5	58.5	79	76	24	25,240	36
Source: SVT
