= Össjö Castle =

Swedish manor house

- Össjö slott
- Ängelholm Municipality
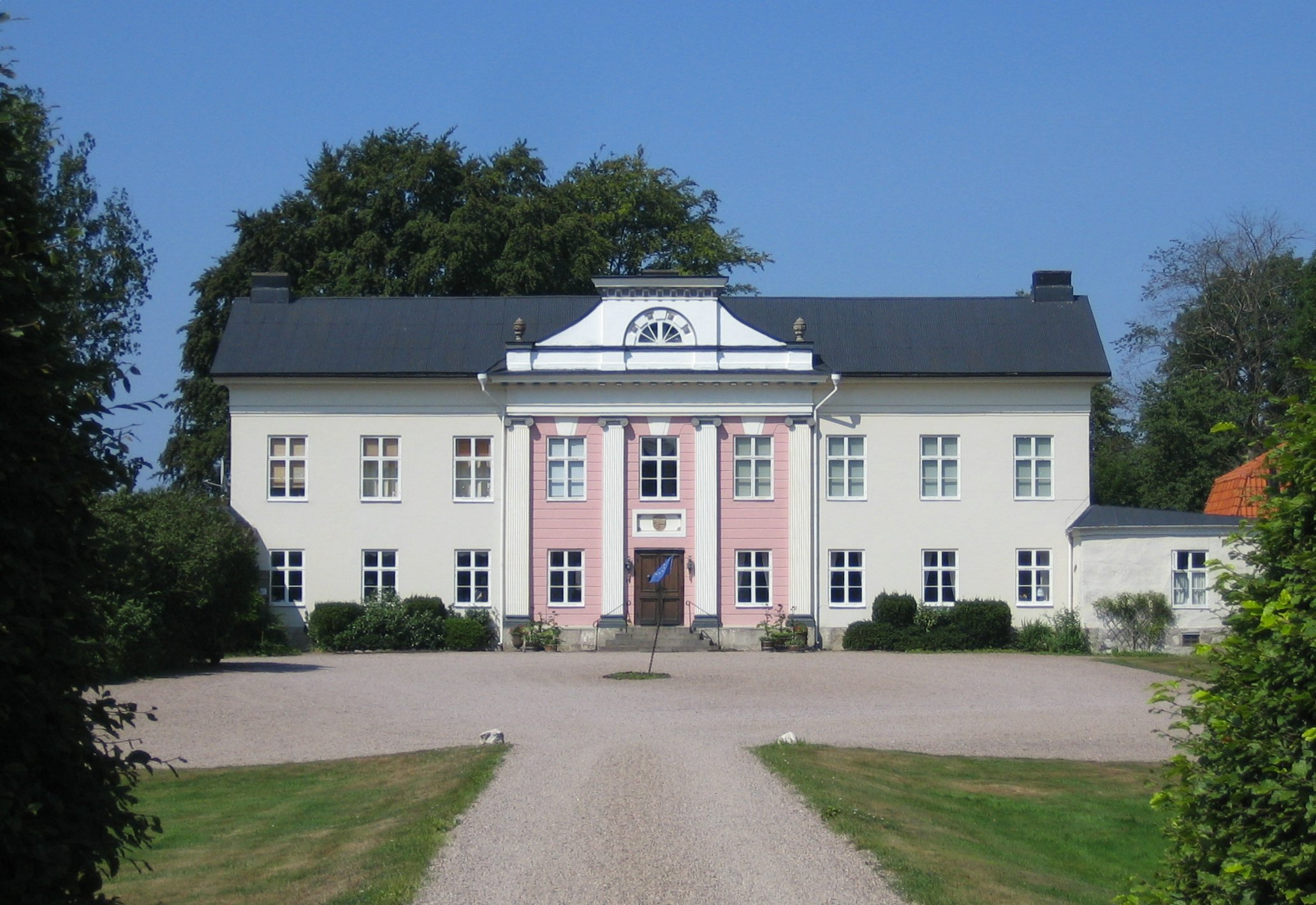
- Össjö Castle

Site information
- Type: Castle
- Open to the public: By appointment

Location
- Scania, Sweden
- Coordinates: 56.231731°N 13.025524°E

Site history
- Built: 1814

Össjö Castle (Swedish: Össjö gård) is a manor house in Ängelholm Municipality in Scania, Sweden. The estate is situated approximately 10 kilometres (6.2 mi) east of Ängelholm. The manor house, a two-story stone structure in Empire style, was built between 1814 and 1815 by Adolf Fredrik Tornérhielm. The property area is 1,400 hectares and covers both fields and woodland.

== See also ==
- List of castles in Sweden
