= Svalöv =

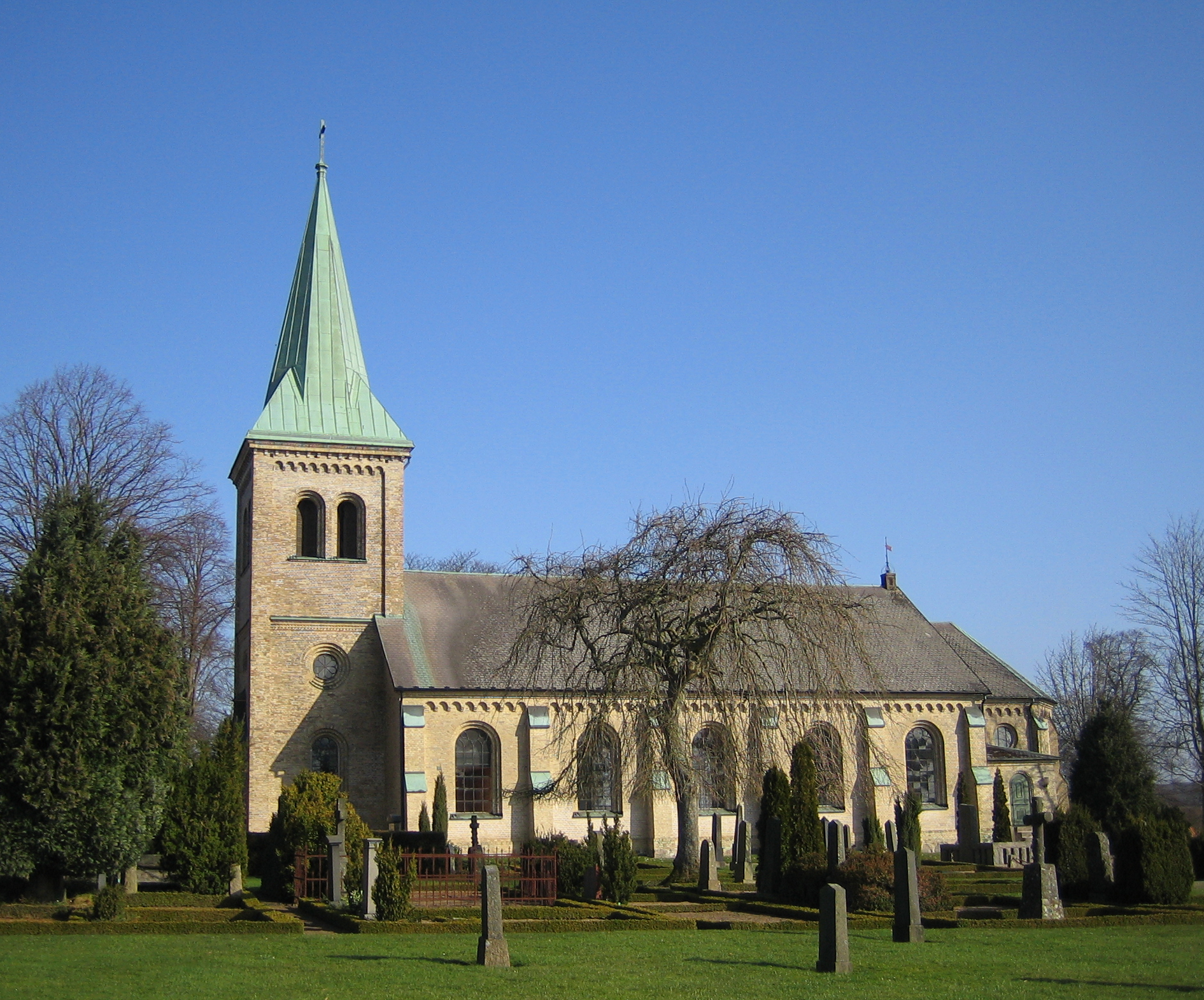
- Svalöv Church

- Coat of arms

- Location within Skåne Location within Sweden
- Coordinates: 55°55′N 13°07′E
- Country: Sweden
- Province: Skåne
- County: Skåne County
- Municipality: Svalöv Municipality

Area
  - Total: 2.39 km^{2} (0.92 sq mi)

Population (31 December 2010)
  - Total: 3,633
  - Density: 1,518/km^{2} (3,930/sq mi)
- Time zone: UTC+1 (CET)
  - Summer (DST): UTC+2 (CEST)

Svalöv (Swedish pronunciation: [ˈsvɑ̂ːlœv]) is a locality and the seat of Svalöv Municipality, Skåne County, Sweden with 3,633 inhabitants in 2010. It is around 35 kilometres (22 miles) north of Malmö.

== Sports ==
The following sports clubs are located in Svalöv:

- Svalövs BK
- Seiki Kai
