= Billesholm =

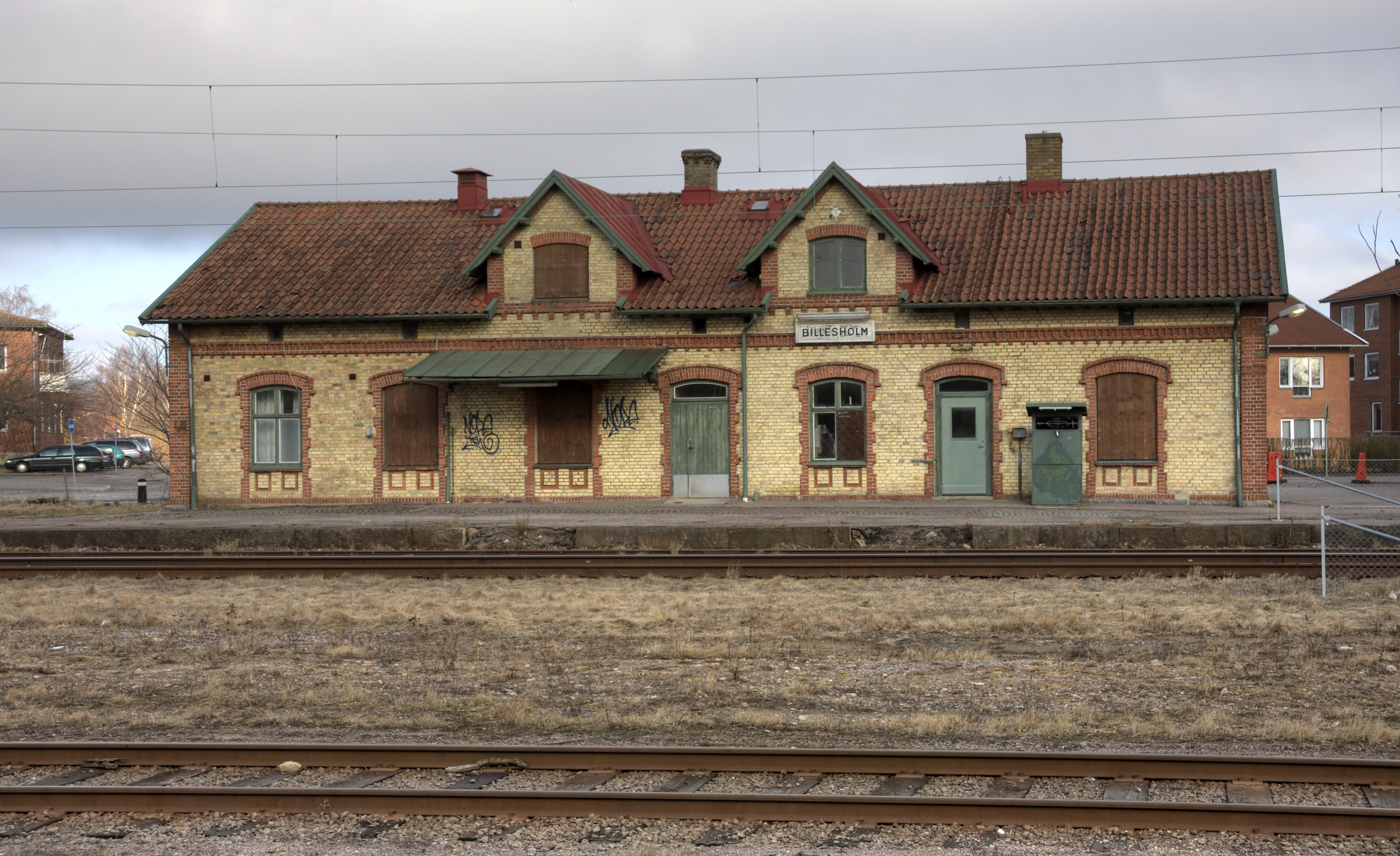
- Billesholm railway station

- Location within Skåne Location within Sweden
- Coordinates: 56°03′N 13°00′E
- Country: Sweden
- Province: Skåne
- County: Skåne County
- Municipality: Bjuv Municipality

Area
  - Total: 2.91 km^{2} (1.12 sq mi)

Population (31 December 2010)
  - Total: 2,910
  - Density: 1,001/km^{2} (2,590/sq mi)
- Time zone: UTC+1 (CET)
  - Summer (DST): UTC+2 (CEST)

Billesholm was a locality situated in Bjuv Municipality, Skåne County, Sweden with 2,910 inhabitants in 2010. By 2015 it has merged with Bjuv and lost its "locality" status.

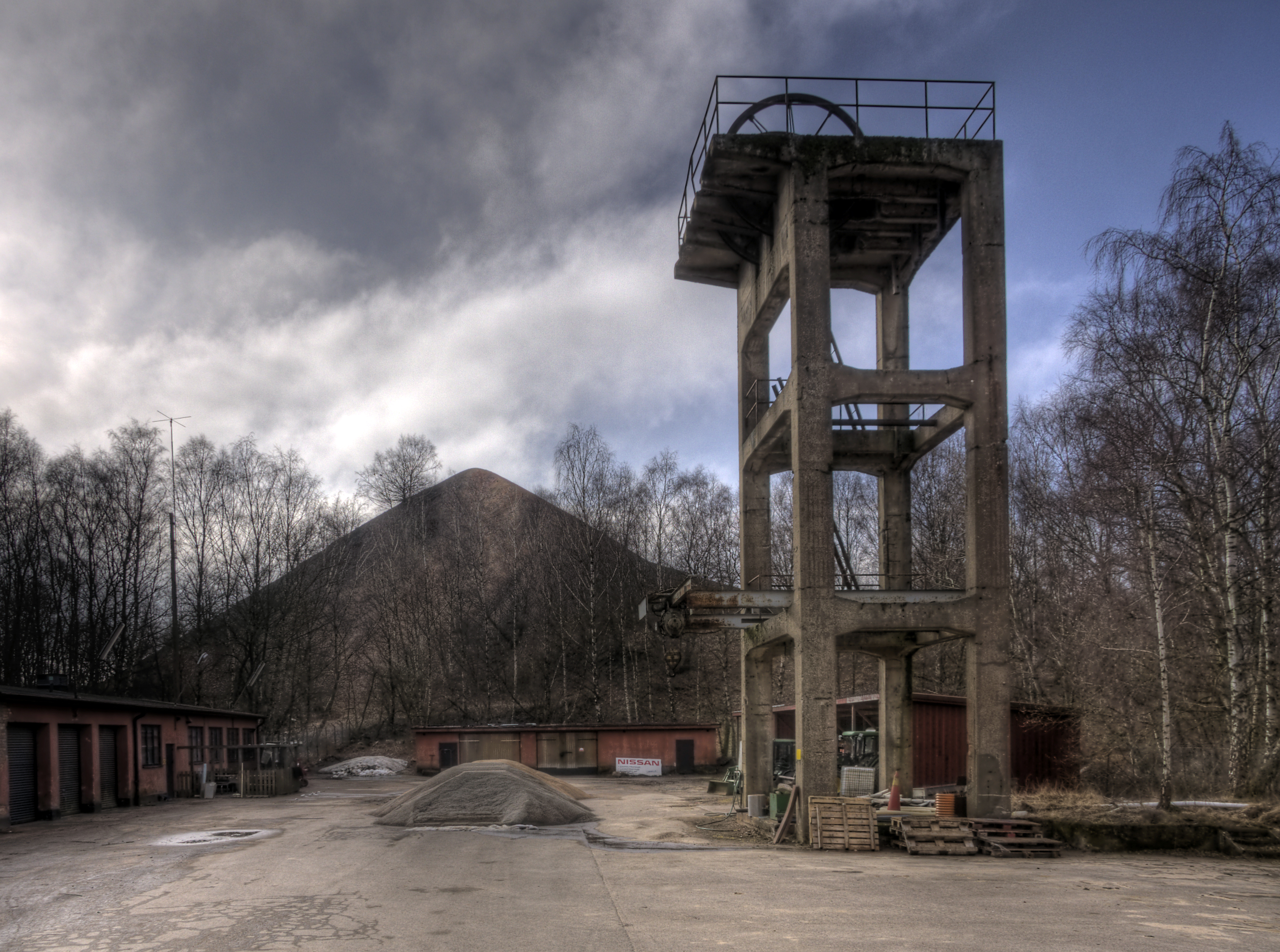
The C. J. Malmros mining shaft near Billesholm in Sweden.
