= Söderåsen =

National park in southern Sweden

Söderåsen National Park
- Söderåsens nationalpark
- IUCN category II (national park)
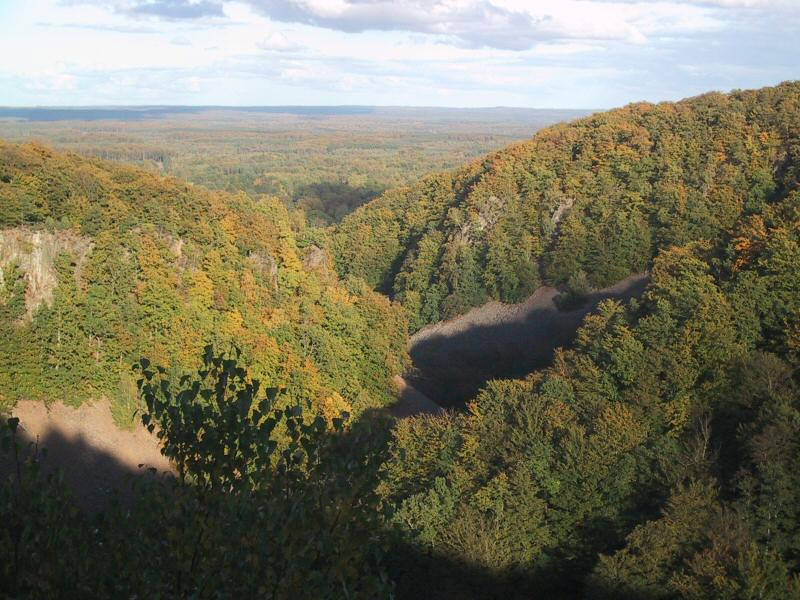
- View from Kopparhatten
- Interactive map of Söderåsen National Park
- Location: Skåne County, Sweden
- Nearest city: Klippan
- Coordinates: 56°01′N 13°13′E
- Area: 16.25 km^{2} (6.27 sq mi)
- Established: 2001
- Visitors: 350,000
- Governing body: Naturvårdsverket

National parks of Sweden (clickable map)

Söderåsen is a northwest–southwest elongated bedrock ridge in Scania in southern Sweden. On Söderåsen is Scania's highest point at 212 m (696 ft) above sea level. It is intersected by several fissure valleys. The ridge extends from Röstånga in the southeast to the Åstorp in northwest.

Söderåsen National Park is located 30 km (19 mi) east of Helsingborg in Scania.

== Geography ==
In Swedish the word ås commonly refer to eskers, a glacial landform, but in the case of Söderåsen it corresponds to a tectonic landform called horst in the Sorgenfrei-Tornquist Zone. The last glacial ice sheet, the Weichsel ice, left the area of Söderåsen 14,000 to 13,500 years BP. Following this there was a period up to 12,700 years BP of cold non-glacial conditions with permafrost and strong winds.

=== Kopparhatten ===
On Söderåsen is the viewpoint Kopparhatten at a height of 200 m (660 ft). It is the highest point in Söderåsens national park. This part of the hill has a particularly dramatic landscape, with up to 90 m (300 ft) deep ravines. Various nivation hollows exists in the vicinity of Kopparhatten.

=== Streams ===
The Kvärkabäcken and Skäralid streams that traverses Söderåsen are believed to be antecedent rivers that existed prior to the present-day relief. These rivers may date to Neogene times when the South Småland peneplain formed. The streams were then likely modified by meltwater during the deglaciations.

=== Oden Lake ===
Oden Lake (Swedish: Odensjön) is a lake in Scania, in Sweden and belongs to Söderåsens National park. The lake is circular in shape, with a diameter of 150 m (490 ft) and it is 19 m (62 ft) deep. Oden Lake likely formed from a glacier niche, and the name Oden Lake may have been due to the circular shape as compared to the Norse god Odin's one eye. Earlier views have suggested the lake may be a volcanic explosion crater, a nivation hollow or formed by fluvial erosion or as plunge pool of glacial meltwater. These various theories that had accumulated up to the 1980s were proposed by Alfred Gabriel Nathorst, Lennart von Post, Mats Åkesson and Anders Rapp among others.

== Flora, fauna, and funga ==
The landscape offers views of leafy deciduous forests and powerful screes with high rocks, flowing watercourses and wide vistas.

The forest, is made up of different types of trees as for example beech, douglas fir, oak or ash. The ground of the forest is covered with a notable amount of plant species. The area is rich with mushrooms, insects, water creatures, mosses, birds and bats.

Because of the rugged landscape, many characteristics of primeval forest have been preserved, such as an abundance of dead trees. This makes the insect life rich, with many rare beetles. The flora is also extremely rich, with species such as hollowwort, enchanter's nightshade and tall meadow-rue.

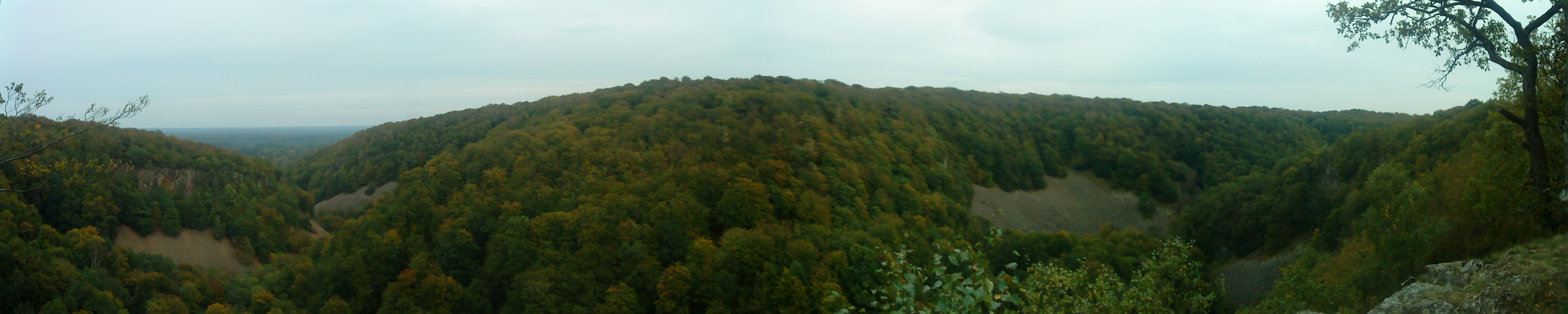
Panoramic view from Kopparhatten

== Söderåsen National Park ==
The Söderåsen National Park (Swedish: Söderåsens nationalpark) is a designated area of about 16 km^{2} (6.2 mi^{2}). It was established in 2001 in the municipalities of Klippan and Svalöv and ranges from the Skäralid ravine in the north to the Nackarpsdalen in the south. It was already a protected area, and when it became a national park, the protection of the land increased.

Some of the noted features in the national park are the Oden Lake in Nackarpsdalen and the viewpoints Kopparhatten, Hjortsprånget and Lierna along the Skäralidsdalen.
