= Bjuv Municipality =

Bjuv Municipality Bjuvs kommun
- Municipality
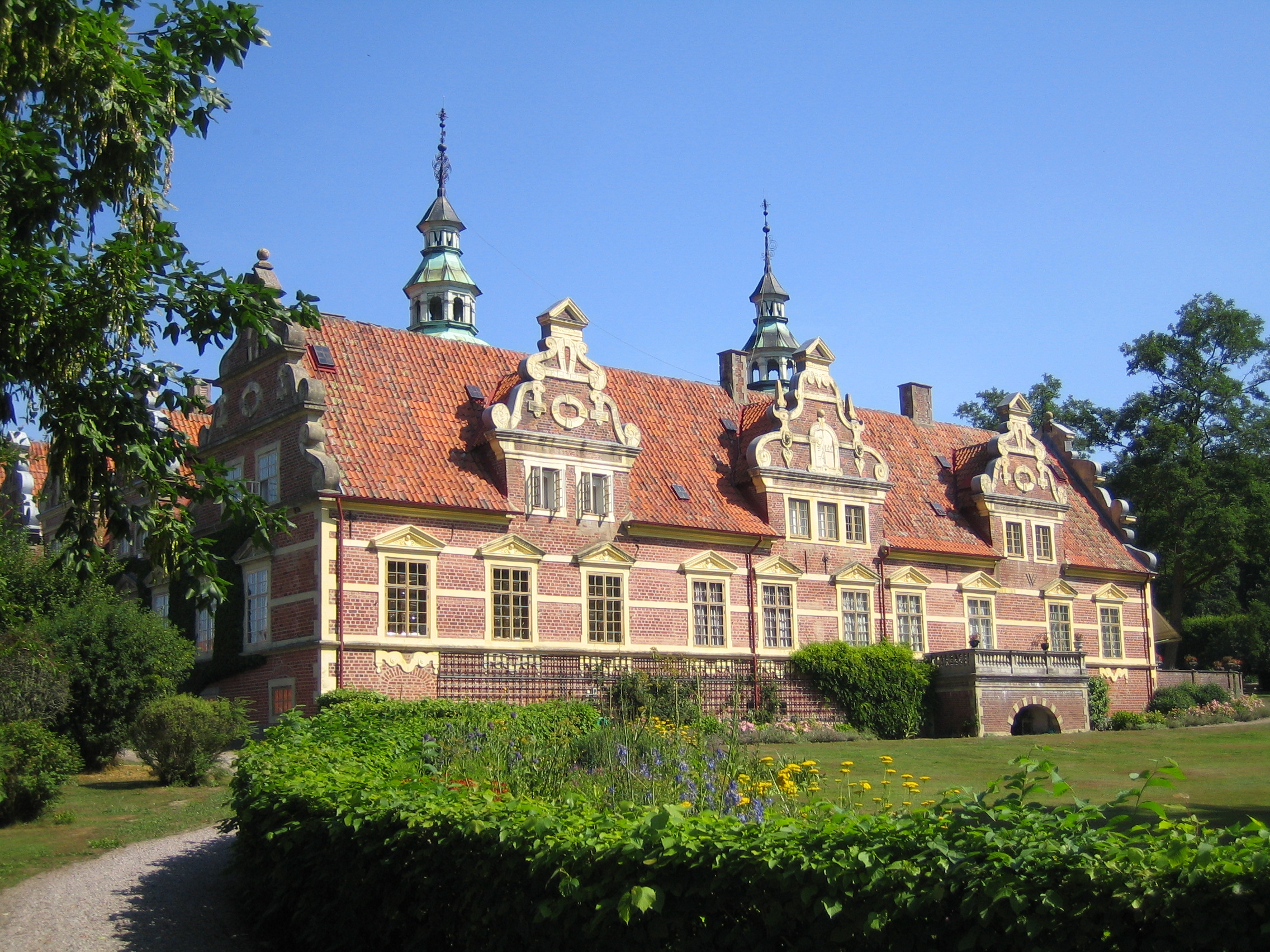
- Vrams Gunnarstorp Castle, located in Bjuv Municipality

- Coat of arms

- Coordinates: 56°05′N 12°55′E
- Country: Sweden
- National Area: South Sweden
- County: Skåne County
- Seat: Bjuv

Area
  - Total: 115.75 km^{2} (44.69 sq mi)
  - Land: 115.28 km^{2} (44.51 sq mi)
  - Water: 0.47 km^{2} (0.18 sq mi)
- Area as of 1 January 2014.

Population (30 June 2025)
  - Total: 15,999
  - Density: 138.78/km^{2} (359.45/sq mi)
- Time zone: UTC+1 (CET)
  - Summer (DST): UTC+2 (CEST)
- ISO 3166 code: SE
- Province: Scania
- Municipal code: 1260
- Website: www.bjuv.se

Bjuv Municipality (Swedish: Bjuvs kommun) is a municipality in Skåne County in South Sweden in southern Sweden. Its seat is located in the town of Bjuv.

The amalgamations connected to the 1971 local government reform in Sweden took place in this area in 1974, when "old" Bjuv (a market town (köping) since 1946) was amalgamated with Billesholm and Ekeby.

== History ==
The municipal arms depicts a mining torch lighting up a dark area. The reason is that Bjuv Municipality has had a coal mining industry since the 18th century. In the end of the 19th century, the clay industry flourished, based on the coal.

== Localities ==
There were three localities in the municipality in 2026.

Locality	Population
Bjuv	7, 942 (31 December 2021)
Billesholm	4, 169
Ekeby	3, 725

== Demographics ==
This is a demographic table based on Bjuv Municipality's electoral districts in the 2022 Swedish general election sourced from SVT's election platform, in turn taken from SCB official statistics.

In total there were 15,817 residents, including 10,979 Swedish citizens of voting age. 35.1% voted for the left coalition and 63.0% for the right coalition. Indicators are in percentage points except population totals and income.

Location	Residents	Citizen adults	Left vote	Right vote	Employed	Swedish parents	Foreign heritage	Income SEK	Degree
Location			%	%					
Billesholm 1	1,227	809	35.7	62.0	74	68	32	21,941	23
Billesholm 2	1,424	1,072	33.0	65.7	81	76	24	24,690	28
Billesholm 3	1,508	1,005	38.5	60.1	70	57	43	22,569	22
Bjuv 1	1,689	1,300	33.9	65.4	78	69	31	24,459	25
Bjuv 2	1,385	1,013	31.1	66.7	82	68	32	27,032	28
Bjuv 3	1,480	1,042	36.4	61.9	74	67	33	24,213	21
Bjuv 4	1,632	1,043	41.7	55.0	66	48	52	19,544	20
Bjuv 5	1,773	1,130	41.9	53.1	64	43	57	19,177	23
Ekeby 1	1,137	806	32.3	65.2	78	77	23	23,997	25
Ekeby 2	1,262	853	29.2	70.1	80	76	24	25,632	21
Ekeby 3	1,300	906	29.6	69.7	81	82	18	26,388	25
Source: SVT

== Politics ==
After 2022 election composition of the municipal council was as follows:

Party	Seats	±
Sweden Democrats	13	+2
Social Democratic Party	10	-1
Moderate Party	5	
Centre Party	1	
Christian Democrats	1	
Liberals	1	
Left Party	1	
Total	31	
