= Bjuv =

Locality in Skåne County, Sweden

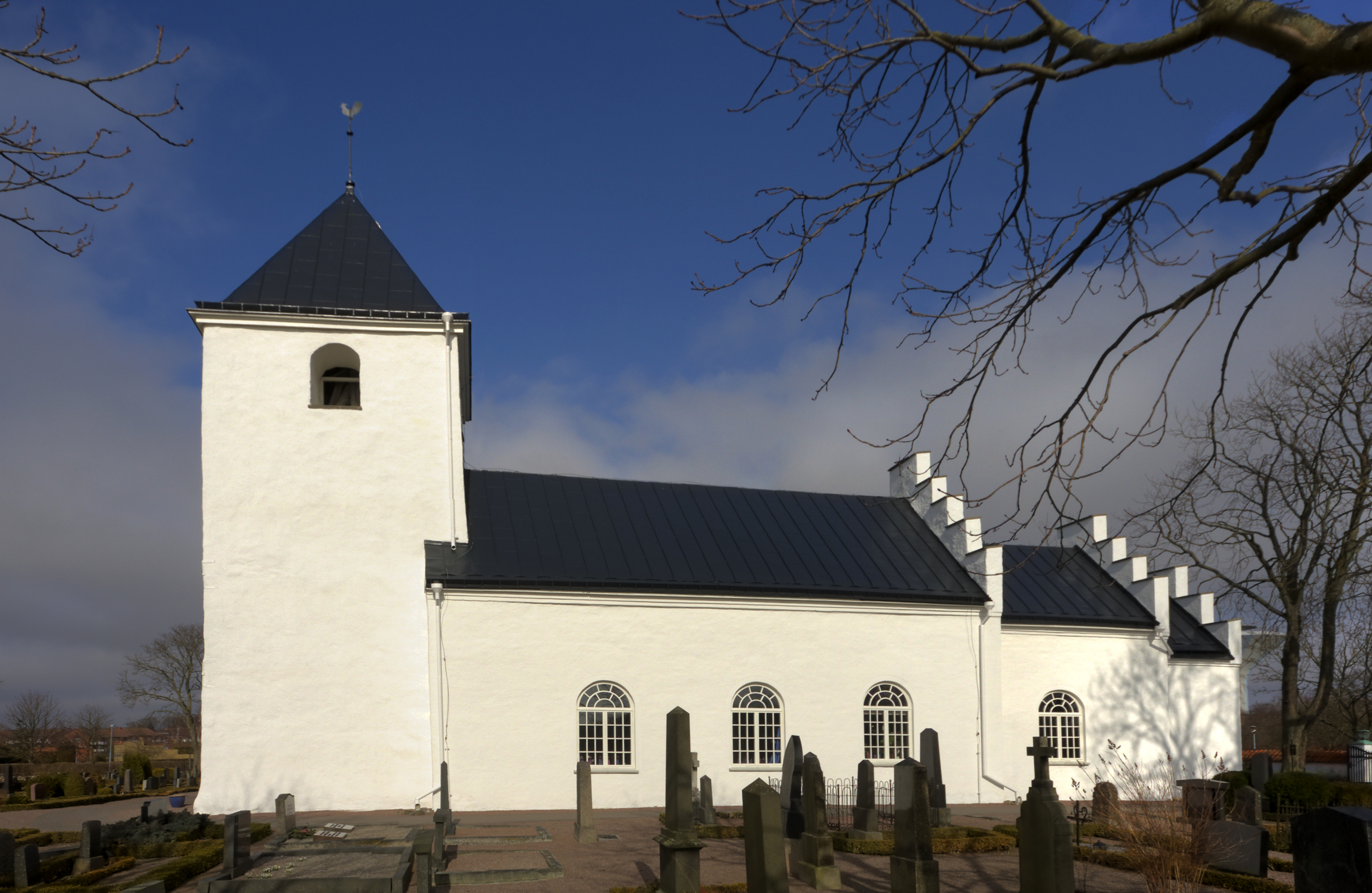
- Bjuv Church

- Coat of arms

- Location within Skåne Location within Sweden
- Coordinates: 56°5′N 12°55′E
- Country: Sweden
- Province: Skåne
- County: Skåne County
- Municipality: Bjuv Municipality

Area
  - Total: 115 km^{2} (44 sq mi)

Population (November 2022)
  - Total: 16,000 Bjuv Municipality
  - Density: 139/km^{2} (360/sq mi)
- Time zone: UTC+1 (CET)
  - Summer (DST): UTC+2 (CEST)

Bjuv is a locality and the seat of Bjuv Municipality, Skåne County, Sweden with 7 942 inhabitants in 2021.

== History ==
=== Church ===
Bjuv dates back to the Middle Ages. The church was built in the 1160s, and a tower and porch were added in the 1400s. Adjacent to it are the rectory, built in 1918, and the school, built in 1902.

=== Coal deposits ===
The region’s large coal deposits were significant for Bjuv, which came to be shaped by coal mining and developed into a traditional industrial community. Mining in Bjuv began in the 1870s. The Greve Strömfeldt shaft, which came into operation in the 1890s, was the last shaft in operation in Sweden and closed in 1979. Today, the shaft’s machine house serves as a mining museum. Next to the shaft stands a bathhouse from 1903. Coal mining required a large workforce. Migration to Bjuv was extensive, and housing began to be built. Next to the houses were coal sheds where the workers’ coal could be stored. Bjuv also got a hospital in the 1880s.

Alongside coal, refractory clay was mined, which led to the industrial production of various brick and clay products. The demand for bricks and the abundant clay deposits resulted in several brickworks being established in the area.

The town grew rapidly in the late 19th century as a mining center, and when the Helsingborg–Hässleholm Railway opened in 1875, Bjuv gained rail connections capable of transporting the fragile coal. Later, a railway was also built to Billesholm to connect with the heavily trafficked West Coast Line.

== The Canning Industry ==
Starting in the 20th century, the canning industry became a major part of Bjuv’s economy. Skånska Fruktvin & Likörfabriken AB was established in Bjuv in 1903. It was the predecessor of the Findus canning factory. This company later relocated to Germany. Findus also built housing for its employees. During the 18th century, Selleberga had been a small village comprising three farms. The land in Selleberga was acquired by Findus in the 1940s, and a residential area designed by architect Artur von Schmalensee was built there. The housing development was surrounded by generously sized gardens modeled after the ideals of the English garden city and is grouped around an open space.
