= La Dolce Vita – Det bästa 1982–2003 =

La Dolce Vita - Det Bästa 1982-2003

Compilation album by Mauro Scocco
- Released: November 2003
- Genre: Pop
- Label: Diesel Music

Mauro Scocco chronology
Beat Hotel (2003)	La Dolce Vita - Det Bästa 1982-2003 (2003)	Herr Jimsons Äventyr (2005)

Professional ratings
Review scores
Source	Rating
Göteborgsposten	5/5 stars
dagensskiva.com	7/10 stars

La Dolce Vita – Det Bästa 1982–2003 (La Dolce Vita - The Best) is the second compilation album by Swedish pop music artist Mauro Scocco. Unlike the previous greatest hits compilation, Hits, this double CD spanned Scocco's entire career, including his early career as a member of the pop group Ratata. The selections were picked by Scocco himself. It also included a version of the Scocco-penned Lisa Nilsson hit "Himlen runt hörnet", featuring Scocco himself, Nilsson, and Swedish blues artist Driftwood. There were also various unreleased demos included on the album. It was released in 2003 through Scocco's own record label Diesel Music.

The album is named after the 1960 Federico Fellini film La Dolce Vita, which is Italian for "The Sweet Life". It also included the previously unreleased song "La Dolce Vita", that was also released as a single.

== Track listing ==
=== Disc one ===
1. "Himlen runt hörnet" (with Driftwood) – 4.00
2. "Natt Efter Natt" – 3.42 (Ratata)
3. "Jackie" – 3.31 (Ratata)
4. "Så Länge Vi Har Varann" – 4.39 (Ratata & Frida)
5. "Hem Till Stockholm" – 3.29
6. "Sarah" – 4.31
7. "Vem Är Han" – 3.38
8. "Himlen" – 5.01 (Ratata)
9. "Clarence" – 4.32 (Ratata & Plura Jonsson)
10. "Se På Mig Nu" – 5.01 (Ratata)
11. "Det Finns" – 4.10
12. "Ingen Vinner" – 3.23
13. "Någon Som Du" – 4.01
14. "Till Dom Ensamma" – 5.00
15. "Mitt Liv" – 4.19
16. "Om Du Var Min (Edit)" – 4.55
17. "Överallt" – 4.38
18. "Hel Igen" – 5.25

=== Disc two ===
1. "La Dolce Vita" – 3.44
2. "Gröne Greven (Demo)" – 3.17
3. "Ett Fönster Mot Gården (Demo)" – 3.14
4. "Bilder Av Dom Vi Var" (with Esbjörn Svensson Trio) – 4.15
5. "En Bild I Min Plånbok" – 4.21
6. "Kärleken Var Här" – 4.10
7. "Som Främlingar" – 4.06
8. "Långsamt Farväl" – 4.56
9. "Himlen Tillhör Dig Och Mig" – 4.18
10. "En Ensam Man" – 6.03
11. "Tvärs Över Mitt Hjärta" – 3.22
12. "Du Är Aldrig Ensam (Edit)" – 4.52
13. "En Gång Var Jag Kung" – 3.17
14. "Sommar I Stockholm" – 3.41
15. "Forfarande Här" – 3.57
16. "Den 11:e" – 3.49
17. "Lev Nu" – 3.52
18. "Där Drömmar Dör (Demo)" – 4.00
19. "Rakt Ut I Natten" – 4.07
