= Mauro & Pluras tågluff =

- Genre: Travel documentary Reality television
- Starring: Mauro Scocco; Plura Jonsson
- Narrated by: Kjell Alinge
- Theme music composer: Django Reinhardt; Stéphane Grappelli
- Opening theme: Django's Tiger
- Country of origin: Sweden
- Original language: Swedish
- No. of seasons: 1
- No. of episodes: 8

Production
- Producer: Jasper Lake
- Production locations: France; Spain (partly); Sweden (partly)
- Running time: 45 minutes
- Production company: Mastiff

Original release
- Network: TV3
- Release: 4 January – 22 February 2014

Mauro & Pluras tågluff (English: Mauro & Plura's Interrailing) ia a Swedish travel and reality show that aired in early 2014, starring the musicians Mauro Scocco of Ratata(band) and Plura Jonsson of Eldkvarn. It is a spin-off of their earlier work, the cooking show Mauro & Pluras kök.The show was produced during the spring of 2013.

The show follows the two musicians as they go on an interrail journey along the French Atlantic coast, via the Pyrenees to Camargue by the Mediterranean Sea. During the show, the cameras follow their experiences, discussions and restaurant visits while Kjell Alinge narrates. Alongside is illustrator Love Nordberg, whose aquarelle paintings are shown during the introduction and as a divider in the show.

== Route ==
The destinations for each episode are:

1. Paris – Deauville/Trouville – Honfleur – Cabourg – Omaha Beach
2. Cancale – Dinard – Mont Saint-Michel – Île-de-Bréhat
3. Brest – Huelgoat – Pont-Aven – Riec-sur-Belon – Bodil Malmsten's Finistère
4. La Rochelle – Île de Ré
5. Bordeaux
6. Saint-Jean-de-Luz – Saint-Jean-Pied-de-Port – San Sebastián
7. Carcassonne – Canal du Midi (with narrowboat)
8. Canal du Midi (with narrowboat) – La Grande-Motte – Camargue

== Reviews ==
The show was given a positive review by Björn Finér from TVDags who called it a "welcoming cozy-sullen return". In his review of the accompanying album, Joacim Forsén from Aftonbladet positively highlighted Scocco and Jonsson's unpretentious DIY spirit by including the recorded "junk" parts in the show, creating a "unique easy-going after-party atmosphere of unpretentious shots and a playful botanization among genres". Mathias Jensen from Gaffa called Mauro & Pluras tågluff their most becoming production.
