= Tillbaks till världen =

Studio album by Mauro Scocco
- Released: 13 October 1999
- Genre: Pop
- Labels: Diesel Music (Sweden); Hollywood (U.S./Canada)

Mauro Scocco chronology
Hits (1997)	Tillbaks till världen (1999)	Beat Hotel (2003)

Professional ratings
Review scores
Source	Rating
Aftonbladet	4/5 stars

Tillbaks till världen (Back to the World) is the seventh studio album by Swedish pop music artist Mauro Scocco. It was released in 1999 through Scocco's own record label Diesel Music, three years after its predecessor Godmorgon Sverige. Reportedly, Scocco spent two years writing 34 songs for this album and chose the best twelve. The album peaked at number three on the Swedish Albums Chart.

== Composition and response ==
On this album, Scocco left the earlier electronic, synthesizer-heavy sound for a more live sound; he wanted "less machines, more people". No samples were used, and synthesizers were used on just three places. Instead, he used real horn and string sections. Scocco, now 37 years old, described this album as a bit more "mature", grown-up album, with reflective lyrics; the song "En ensam man" (A lonely man) is about regret for lost love. This track, a ballad, is described by reviewer Per Bjurman as "one of the strongest tracks he [Scocco] has written", and likens it to Prince and Harold Melvin & the Blue Notes.

Bjurman further compares the album to fellow Swedish artist Orup, and thinks that many will compare it to Bo Kaspers Orkester ("but don't believe them", Bjurman adds), especially the latter's 1988 album I centrum.

== Singles ==
Three singles were released from the album: "Du är aldrig ensam" (You Are Never Alone), "Allt är till salu" (Everything Is for Sale), and "Himlen tillhör dig och mig" (Heaven Belongs to You and Me). Rapper Ayo appears on "Allt är till salu", a song about how the record industry has, according to Scocco, been commercialized in the latest years.

== Track listing ==
1. "En bild i min plånbok" – 4:21
2. "Tillbaks till dig" – 4:52
3. "Hjärtat dröjer sig kvar" – 5:54
4. "Inget är gratis" – 4:51
5. "Himlen tillhör dig och mig" – 4:18
6. "En ensam man" – 6:03
7. "Tvärs över mitt hjärta" – 3:22
8. "Tillbaks till världen" – 4:05
9. "Kom igen" – 4:32
10. "Allt är till salu" – 4:15
11. "Du är aldrig ensam" – 6:02
12. "Återvändsgränd" – 5:42

== Credits ==
- Lisa Nilsson sings duet with Scocco on "Kom igen".
- Swedish rapper Ayo contributes a rap to "Allt är till salu".

== Charts ==
Chart (1999)	Peak position
Swedish Albums (Sverigetopplistan)	3
