= Årets julklapp! från Mauro Scocco =

Årets julklapp!

Studio album by Mauro Scocco
- Released: 5 November 2012
- Genre: Christmas, pop
- Label: EMI Music Sweden
- Producer: David Nyström

Mauro Scocco chronology
Musik för nyskilda (2011)	Årets julklapp! (2012)

Årets julklapp! was released on 5 November 2012, and is a Mauro Scocco Christmas album. It was only released to digital download, and for physical sales at Coop Forum. The album includes guest artists like Sarah Dawn Finer and Plura Jonsson. The album contains both new songs by Mauro Scocco himself, and recording of songs by other artists. The song Julkort från New York also appeared on his 2011 album Musik för nyskilda. In 2013 the album was rerelased with the additional title: "Andra utgåvan", containing the single "Vita vägen hem" acting as a bonus track bonusspår.

The album sold platina, and became the third most sold album in Sweden during 2012.

== Track listing ==
1. Tomten (Mauro Scocco, Viktor Rydberg), Hilda Borgström reads
2. Änglar i snön (Mauro Scocco)
3. Årets julklapp (Mauro Scocco)
4. Grand Hotel (Mauro Scocco), vocals by Sarah Dawn Finer
5. Viskar en bön (Mauro Scocco, Peter Hallström)
6. Då är hela världen vit (Mauro Scocco)
7. Första snön är alltid vitast (Tomas Andersson Wij, Plura Jonsson)
8. Julkort från New York (Mauro Scocco)
9. Stilla natt (Stille Nacht, heilige Nacht) (Franz Gruber)
10. Snart kommer änglarna att landa (Ulf Lundell)
11. Snökristaller (Mauro Scocco, Karl-Alfred Melin)
12. Bella Notte (Sonny Burke, Karl Lennart, Gardar Sandberg)
13. Vita vägen hem (Mauro Scocco) (second edition bonus track)

== Contributors ==
1. Mauro Scocco (guitar, harmonica)
2. David Nyström (piano, bass, programming, producer)
3. Ola Gustafsson (guitar, pedal steel, mandolin)
4. Josef Zackrisson (programming)
5. Niklas Gabrielsson (drums, percussion, tin whistle)

== Charts ==
Chart (2013)	Peak position
Swedish Albums (Sverigetopplistan)	36
