= Feyen =

Feyen is a surname. Notable people with the name include:

- Auguste Feyen-Perrin (1826– 1888), French painter, engraver, and illustrator
- Dan Feyen, American printer and politician
- Jacques-Eugène Feyen (1815–1908), French painter
