= 20 – En jubileumssamling =

Compilation album by Lisa Nilsson
- Released: 14 June 2010
- Length: 1 hours, 16 minutes
- Label: Diesel

Lisa Nilsson chronology
Sambou Sambou (2009)	20 – En jubileumssamling (2010)	Sånger om oss (2013)

Sånger om oss is a 2010 Lisa Nilsson compilation album.

== Track listing ==
1. I samma andetag
2. Regn i rio
3. Allt jag behöver
4. Mysteriet deg
5. Wave
6. Viola
7. Vad du ser är vad du får
8. It's Easy
9. Varje gång jag ser dig
10. Du (öppnar min värld)
11. Långsamt farväl
12. Himlen runt hörnet
13. Handens fem fingar
14. Små rum
15. Tror på dig (with Stephen Simmonds)
16. Säg det igen
17. En kort en lång
18. Unforgettable (live, with Danmarks Radios Underholdningsorkestret)

== Charts ==
=== Weekly charts ===
Chart (2010)	Peak position
Danish Albums (Hitlisten)	3
Finnish Albums (Suomen virallinen lista)	6
Swedish Albums (Sverigetopplistan)	6

=== Year-end charts ===
Chart (2010)	Position
Swedish Albums (Sverigetopplistan)	55
