= Det sjungande trädet =

Det sjungande trädet may refer to:

- Det sjungande trädet (album), 1991, by Swedish pop musician Mauro Scocco
  - "Det sjungande trädet", a song from the album
- Det sjungande trädet (opera), 1995, by Finnish composer Erik Bergman
- Det sjungande trädet (painting), 1915, by Swedish expressionist painter Isaac Grünewald
