= Snart kommer änglarna att landa =

Single by Ulf Lundell
- A-side: "Snart kommer änglarna att landa"
- B-side: "Natt"
- Released: 1981
- Genre: Christmas, rock
- Label: Parlophone
- Songwriter: Ulf Lundell

"Snart kommer änglarna att landa" is a Christmas song written by Ulf Lundell, and originally recorded by various artists on the 1979 album Glitter glögg & rock 'n' roll. Ulf Lundell later recorded the song on his own, and released it as a single in 1981.

The song has also been recorded by the choir Ad Libitum on the 1984 album När morgonen gryr. and by Mauro Scocco in 2012 on the album Årets julklapp! från Mauro Scocco.

In 2023 Ulf Lundell released a new recording of the song.

== Charts ==
Chart (1982)	Peak position
Sweden (Sverigetopplistan)	10
