= Scocco =

Scocco is an Italian surname. Notable people with the surname include:

- Ignacio Scocco (born 1985), Argentine footballer
- Mauro Scocco (born 1962), Swedish pop artist of Italian descent
