= Himlen runt hörnet =

Studio album by Lisa Nilsson
- Released: 1992
- Genre: Pop
- Length: 45 minutes
- Label: Diesel
- Producer: Johan Ekelund

Lisa Nilsson chronology
Indestructible (1991)	Himlen runt hörnet (1992)	Till Morelia (1995)

Himlen runt hörnet is the first studio album by Swedish singer Lisa Nilsson. The album was awarded a Grammis Award in the album of the year category and a Rockbjörnen award in the Swedish record of the year category. The album was also recorded in an English language-version, as "Ticket to Heaven". Himlen runt hörnet peaked at number one on the Swedish Albums Chart and number 11 on the Norwegian Albums Chart.

== Track listing ==
1. Himlen runt hörnet – 5:03
2. Aldrig, aldrig, aldrig – 4:56
3. Du (92) – 4:45
4. Ändå faller regnet – 4:36
5. Varje gång jag ser dig – 4:06
6. Här kommer han – 4:01
7. Om du har något hjärta – 3:55
8. Allt jag behöver – 4:59
9. Vem – 2:50
10. Försiktigt – 6:09

== Personnel ==
- David Wilczewski – saxophone
- Johan Ekelund – keyboard
- Mattias Torell – guitar
- Lasse Andersson – bass, electric piano
- Per Lindvall – drums

== Charts ==
Chart (1992)	Peak position
Norwegian Albums (VG-lista)	11
Swedish Albums (Sverigetopplistan)	1
