= Mauro Scocco (album) =

1988 studio album by Mauro Scocco

Studio album by Mauro Scocco
- Released: 1 November 1988
- Studio: Polar and B3B, Stockholm
- Genre: Pop rock
- Label: The Record Station
- Producer: Mauro Scocco; Kaj Erixon

Mauro Scocco chronology
Mauro Scocco (1988)	Dr. Space dagbok (1991)

Singles from Mauro Scocco
- 1. "Vem är han" Released: 1988; 2. "Sarah" Released: 1 September 1988

Mauro Scocco is the self-titled debut studio album by Swedish pop music artist Mauro Scocco, as a solo artist. He had previously recorded albums with the group Ratata. It was released in 1988 through the record label The Record Station.

The first single, "Sarah", is one of Scocco's best known songs. "Vem är han" ("Who is he") was also released as a single.

== Track listing ==
All tracks written by Scocco.

=== Side one ===
1. "Hem till Stockholm" – 3:27
2. "Sarah" – 4:28
3. "Vem är han" – 3:36
4. "Julia" – 2:56
5. "Ond cirkel" – 3:26

=== Side two ===
1. "Hur många gånger" – 3:50
2. "Ingen som du" – 3:58
3. "Inget kan stoppa oss nu" – 4:14
4. "Vad ska jag säga" – 3:50
5. "Hon gör mig tokig" – 3:30

The CD release also includes the track "Ett hjärta".

== Charts ==
Chart (1988–1989)	Peak position
Swedish Albums (Sverigetopplistan)	1
