= Hotel Vermont 609 =

Studio album by Lisa Nilsson
- Released: 4 October 2006
- Recorded: AR Studio, Rio de Janeiro, Brazil, February–March 2006
- Label: Sony BMG Music Entertainment
- Producer: Lisa Nilsson

Lisa Nilsson chronology
Samlade sånger 1992-2003 (2003)	Hotel Vermont 609 (2006)	Sambou Sambou (2009)

Hotel Vermont 609 is a 2006 Lisa Nilsson studio album. The album was recorded in Brazil, and consists of Brazilian popschlagers from the 1960s and 70s, rewritten from Portuguese to Swedish.

== Track listing ==
1. Ponta de Areia (intro) (Milton Nasciemento, Fernando Brant)
2. I hörnet av hjärtat (Clube da esquina) (Milton Nasciemento, Lô Borges, Marcio Borges, Lisa Nilsson)
3. Regn i Rio (Lisa Nilsson, João Castilho)
4. Genom tid och rum (Sentinela) (Milton Nasciemento, Lô Borges, Marcio Borges, Lisa Nilsson)
5. Snurra, moder jord (Quantas voltas dá meu mundo) (Djavan, Lisa Nilsson)
6. Var det bara regn? (Morena de edoidecer) (Djavan, Lisa Nilsson)
7. För att ta farväl (Pra dizer adeus) (Edu Lobo, Torquato Neto, Lisa Nilsson)
8. Vinden (O vento) (Dorival Caymmi, Lisa Nilsson)
9. Allt du ville vara (Tudo que você podia ser) (Lô Borges, Marcio Borges, Lisa Nilsson)
10. Gryning (Nascente) (Milton Nasciemento, Fernando Brant, Lisa Nilsson)
11. Só louco (Dorival Caymmi, Lisa Nilsson)
12. Ponta de Areia (outro) (Milton Nasciemento, Fernando Brant)

== Contributors ==
- Lisa Nilsson - singer, Glockenspiel, handclap, producer
- Banda Beleza - musicians

== Charts ==
=== Weekly charts ===
Chart (2006)	Peak position
Danish Albums (Hitlisten)	12
Norwegian Albums (VG-lista)	19
Swedish Albums (Sverigetopplistan)	1

=== Year-end charts ===
Chart (2006)	Position
Swedish Albums (Sverigetopplistan)	69
