= Till dom ensamma =

Single by Mauro Scocco
- A-side: "Till dom ensamma"
- B-side: "Om en gammal man"
- Released: 1991
- Genre: Swedish pop
- Label: Diesel
- Songwriter: Mauro Scocco

"Till dom ensamma" is a song written and recorded by Mauro Scocco for his 1991 studio album Dr. Space dagbok, and released as a single the same year. The song charted at Svensktoppen for 22 weeks between 8 December 1991-10 May 1992, topping the chart. It also peaked at number 12 on the Swedish Singles Chart.

== Other recordings ==
Date participated at Dansbandskampen 2009, performing the song, and they also recorded it for their 2010 album Här och nu!.

== Charts ==
Chart (1992)	Peak position
Sweden (Sverigetopplistan)	12
