= Varje gång jag ser dig =

Single by Lisa Nilsson

from the album Himlen runt hörnet
- A-side: "Varje gång jag ser dig"
- Released: 1992 (Original version); 1995 (Macarena Club Cutz version)
- Genre: Swedish pop, House
- Songwriter: Mauro Scocco

"Varje gång jag ser dig" is a song written by Mauro Scocco and recorded by Swedish artist Lisa Nilsson for the 1992 album Himlen runt hörnet. Peaking at 5th position at the Swedish singles chart, the song also charted at Svensktoppen for 14 weeks between 31 May-25 October 1992. The song also stayed at Trackslistan for five weeks between 23 May-20 June 1992, peaking at second position.

The song has also been recorded in English as "Let Me in Your Heart".

== Charts ==
Chart (1992)	Peak position
Sweden (Sverigetopplistan)	5
