= Sarah (Mauro Scocco song) =

Single by Mauro Scocco

from the album Mauro Scocco
- A-side: "Sarah"
- B-side: "Ett hjärta"
- Released: 1988
- Genre: Swedish pop
- Label: The Record Station
- Songwriter: Mauro Scocco

"Sarah" is a song written and recorded by Mauro Scocco for his self-titled debut album. Released in 1988 as his debut single, "Sarah" reached number one on the Swedish singles chart. It also charted on the Svensktoppen for 14 weeks between 7 October 1988-22 January 1989, also topping that chart. "Sarah" became the most popular Trackslistan song of 1988.

In the TV program Pluras kök, aired in April 2011, actress Elin Klinga said she was the inspiration for the song. On 20 May 2011, Mauro Scocco confirmed this for P3 Populär.

== Music video ==
Parts of the music video were shot in the 7-Eleven store at the corner near Valhallavägen and Artillerigatan. Other parts were recorded at Jungfrugatan in Östermalm, where "Sarah" is seen in one of the French windows at Jungfrugatan 52.

Also appearing in the video are Catarina Svensk (as "Sarah"), Orup and Johan Kinde.

== Charts ==
| Chart (1988–1989) | Peak position |
|---|---|
| Sweden (Sverigetopplistan) | 1 |

== Other versions ==
- At Dansbandskampen 2008, the song was performed by Scotts. A version was also recorded for their 2008 album På vårt sätt.
