= Sånger om oss =

Studio album by Lisa Nilsson
- Released: 25 September 2013
- Length: 51 minutes
- Label: Sony Music Entertainment
- Producer: Lisa Nilsson, Pål Svenre

Lisa Nilsson chronology
20 – En jubileumssamling (2010)	Sånger om oss (2013)

Sånger om oss is a 2013 Lisa Nilsson studio album.

== Track listing ==
1. Var är du min vän? (Andreas Mattsson)
2. Sången om oss (Lisa Nilsson, Peter LeMarc)
3. Min tid i dina händer (Lisa Nilsson, Mattias Torell)
4. Tillbaka (Lisa Nilsson, Henrik Janson)
5. Kom hem (Lisa Nilsson, Mattias Torell)
6. Det säger ingenting om oss (Lisa Nilsson, Mattias Torell)
7. Du, kom lite närmare (Lisa Nilsson, Mattias Torell)
8. När en människa faller (Lisa Nilsson, Mattias Torell)
9. Full måne (Lisa Nilsson, Mattias Torell)
10. Allting går över (Lisa Nilsson, Mattias Torell)
11. Dåliga dagar (Lisa Nilsson, Mattias Torell)
12. Och månen såg på (Lisa Nilsson, Peter Hallström)

== Contributors ==
- Lisa Nilsson - singer, producer
- Pål Svenre - keyboard, producer
- Nicci Notini - drums
- Peter Forss - bass
- Mattias Torell - guitar
- Niklas Medin - keyboard
- Sebastian Notini - percussion
- Stockholm Session Strings - musicians

== Charts ==
=== Weekly charts ===
Chart (2013)	Peak position
Danish Albums (Hitlisten)	15
Finnish Albums (Suomen virallinen lista)	27
Norwegian Albums (VG-lista)	9
Swedish Albums (Sverigetopplistan)	3

=== Year-end charts ===
Chart (2013)	Position
Swedish Albums (Sverigetopplistan)	42
