= Herr Jimsons äventyr =

Studio album by Mauro Scocco
- Released: 28 September 2005
- Genre: Pop
- Label: Diesel Music

Mauro Scocco chronology
La Dolce Vita - Det Bästa 1982-2003 (2003)	Herr Jimsons äventyr (2005)

Professional ratings
Review scores
Source	Rating
Expressen	3/5 stars
Oskarshamns-tidningen	3/5 stars
Svenska Dagbladet	2/6 stars

Herr Jimsons äventyr (The adventures of Mr. Jimson) is the ninth studio album by Swedish pop music artist Mauro Scocco. It was released in 2005 through Scocco's record label Diesel Music. The title is an injoke, referencing an incident when Swedish evening newspaper Aftonbladet reported that Scocco was living together with a woman named "Annelie Jimson"; this, however, was made up by Scocco.

Four singles were released from the album: "Min föredetta", "Kall stjärna" (Cold Star), "En av oss" (One of Us) and "Hip hip hurra".

"Hip hip hurra", a duet with Maria Andersson from Swedish band Sahara Hotnights, is a song about celebrity cults.

== Track listing ==
1. "När det otänkbara händer"
2. "Min föredetta"
3. "Lämna din lampa tänd"
4. "Fritt fall"
5. "Solblekt super 8"
6. "Barcelona"
7. "Kall stjärna"
8. "Någonting fattas"
9. "Hip hip hurra" (with Maria Andersson from Sahara Hotnights)
10. "En av oss"
11. "Efter henne"

== Credits ==
- "Lämna din lampa tänd" is written by Peter LeMarc.
