= Himlen runt hörnet (song) =

Single by Lisa Nilsson

from the album Himlen runt hörnet
- Released: 1992
- Songwriter(s): Mauro Scocco

"Himlen runt hörnet" is a song recorded by Lisa Nilsson and released as a single in 1992. In 1995, it was released in English with the title "Ticket to Heaven". The song was given a Grammis award for Song of the Year 1992 and won the Rockbjörnen award in the Swedish Song of the Year 1992 category.

== Mauro Scocco version ==
The song was performed by its composer Mauro Scocco, Nilsson, and Swedish blues artist Driftwood. It formed part of his album La Dolce Vita - Det Bästa 1982-2003.

== Charts ==
Chart (1992)	Peak position
Sweden (Sverigetopplistan)	2
