= Beat Hotel (Mauro Scocco album) =

Studio album by Mauro Scocco
- Released: 24 March 2003
- Genre: Pop
- Label: Diesel Music

Mauro Scocco chronology
Tillbaks till världen (1997)	Beat Hotel (2003)	La Dolce Vita - Det Bästa 1982-2003 (2003)

Beat Hotel is the eighth studio album by Swedish pop music artist Mauro Scocco. It was released in 2003 through Scocco's own label Diesel Music.

Two singles were released from this album: "Han måste undra" (He's Got to Wonder), and "Fortfarande här" (Still Here).

== Track listing ==
1. "En gång var jag kung" – 3:15
2. "Skyldig" – 3:52
3. "Sommar i Stockholm" – 3:43
4. "Den 11:e" – 3:51
5. "Han måste undra" – 5:15
6. "Säg ingenting" – 3:29
7. "Rullat med dom bästa" – 3:32
8. "Fortfarande här" – 4:19
9. "En sprucken vas" – 5:14
10. "Som ett träd i snön" – 3:59
11. "Lev nu" – 3:52

== Charts ==
Chart (2003)	Peak position
Swedish Albums (Sverigetopplistan)	5
