= Godmorgon Sverige =

Studio album by Mauro Scocco
- Released: October 16, 1996
- Genre: Pop
- Label: Diesel Music (Sweden); Hollywood (U.S./Canada)

Mauro Scocco chronology
28 Grader i Skuggan (1994)	Godmorgon Sverige (1996)	Hits (1997)

Professional ratings
Review scores
Source	Rating
Aftonbladet	3/5 stars

Godmorgon Sverige (Good morning, Sweden) is the sixth studio album by Swedish pop music artist Mauro Scocco. It was released in 1996 on Scocco's own record label Diesel Music. The album consists mainly of soul ballads, comparable to an R. Kelly with Swedish lyrics. The lyrics revolve mostly around love, more often than not in a dark way. Three singles were released from the album: "Om Det Är O.K." (If it is OK), "Det Är Dags" (It is time), and "Kärleken Var Här" (Love was here). The album peaked at number one on the Swedish Albums Chart, marking Scocco's third number one album in the country.

== Track listing ==
1. "Intro" – 0:43
2. "Tillbaks Till Kärleken" – 3:37
3. "Om Det Är O.K." – 3:58
4. "Plåster" – 3:47
5. "Vissa Saker" – 4:20
6. "El Diablo" – 0:52
7. "Om Du Säger" – 3:44
8. "Dit Dagarna För Mig" – 4:28
9. "Kärleken Var Här" – 4:10
10. "Interlude" – 1:00
11. "Det Är Dags" – 3:57
12. "För Sista Gången" – 3:35
13. "Bilder Av Dom Vi Var" – 4:15
14. "Som Främlingar" – 4:05

== Credits ==
- Lyrics to "För Sista Gången" by Plura Jonsson.
- On "Bilder Av Dom Vi Var", Scocco is accompanied by Esbjörn Svensson Trio.

== Charts ==
Chart (1996–1997)	Peak position
Swedish Albums (Sverigetopplistan)	1
