= Dr. Space dagbok =

1991 studio album by Mauro Scocco

Studio album by Mauro Scocco
- Released: 12 April 1991
- Studio: B3B, Stockholm
- Genre: Pop
- Label: Diesel Music
- Producer: Mauro Scocco; Kaj Erixon

Mauro Scocco chronology
Mauro Scocco (1988)	Dr. Space dagbok (1991)	Det sjungande trädet (1991)

Singles from Dr. Space dagbok
- 1. "Till dom ensamma" Released: 1991; 2. "Ingen vinner" Released: 10 April 1991; 3. "Det finns" Released: 1991; 4. "Någon som du" Released: 5 June 1991

Dr. Space Dagbok (The diary of Dr. Space) is the second studio album from Swedish pop music artist Mauro Scocco, as a solo artist. It was released in 1991 through Scocco's own record label Diesel Music.

Four singles were released off of this album: "Det Finns" (There Is), "Ingen Vinner" (Nobody Wins), "Någon Som Du" (Somebody Like You), and "Till Dom Ensamma" (For The Lonely). "Till Dom Ensamma" is one of Scocco's most well known songs.

== Track listing ==
1. "Ingen vinner" – 3:21
2. "Någon som du" – 4:00
3. "Du gamla du fria" – 3:33
4. "Till dom ensamma" – 5:00
5. "Hem till jul" – 3:52
6. "Det finns" – 4:09
7. "Eveline" – 2:40
8. "Det tar bara en sekund" – 3:33
9. "Tack" – 4:32
10. "Om en gammal man" – 4:04

== Charts ==
Chart (1991–1992)	Peak position
Swedish Albums (Sverigetopplistan)	5
