= 28 grader i skuggan =

Studio album by Mauro Scocco
- Released: 12 October 1994
- Genre: Pop
- Label: Diesel Music

Mauro Scocco chronology
Ciao! (1992)	28 grader i skuggan (1994)	Godmorgon Sverige (1996)

28 grader i skuggan (28 Degrees in the Shade) is the fifth studio album by Swedish pop music artist Mauro Scocco. It was released in 1994 through Scocco's own record label Diesel Music.

Four singles were released from the album: "Överallt" (Everywhere), "Gå samma väg" (Go the Same Way), "Går ut med mig själv" (Going Out with Myself), and "Hel igen" (Whole Again). The album peaked at number one on the Swedish Albums Chart.

== Track listing ==
28 Grader i Skuggan track listing
No.	Title	Length
1.	"Intro"	0:35
2.	"Gå samma väg"	3:31
3.	"Allt eller inget"	4:25
4.	"Går ut med mig själv"	3:51
5.	"Överallt"	4:38
6.	"Hel igen"	5:25
7.	"Var tar kärleken vägen"	3:50
8.	"Interlude"	0:25
9.	"När det är nog"	4:23
10.	"Allt du söker"	3:37
11.	"Genom sol, genom regn"	4:12
12.	"Socker och salt"	3:13
13.	"Timjan och dill"	0:49
14.	"Måndag igen"	4:24
15.	"Rytmen av ett ensamt hjärta"	3:35

== Charts ==
Chart (1994–1995)	Peak position
Swedish Albums (Sverigetopplistan)	1

== Other sources ==
- mauroscocco.se (requires login)
