= Ciao! (Mauro Scocco album) =

Studio album by Mauro Scocco
- Released: 2 October 1992
- Genre: Pop
- Label: Diesel Music

Mauro Scocco chronology
Det Sjungande Trädet (1991)	Ciao! (1992)	28 Grader i Skuggan (1994)

Ciao! is the fourth studio album from Swedish pop music artist Mauro Scocco. It was released in 1992 on Scocco's own record label Diesel Music.

Four singles were released from this album: "Om du var min" (If You Were Mine), "Nelly", "Mitt liv" (My Life), and "Rymdraket" (Space Rocket). The album peaked at number three on the Swedish Albums Chart.

== Track listing ==
1. "Rymdraket" – 4:37
2. "Mitt liv" – 4:19
3. "Nelly" – 4:12
4. "Även rosor vissnar" – 4:37
5. "Blind" – 3:15
6. "Varför" – 5:04
7. "Om du var min" – 6:30
8. "Perfekt" – 3:48
9. "En del har ingenting" – 3:32
10. "Nästan där" – 4:58

== Charts ==
Chart (1992–1993)	Peak position
Swedish Albums (Sverigetopplistan)	3
