= Pointe du Grouin =

Coordinates: 48°42′44″N 1°50′39″W

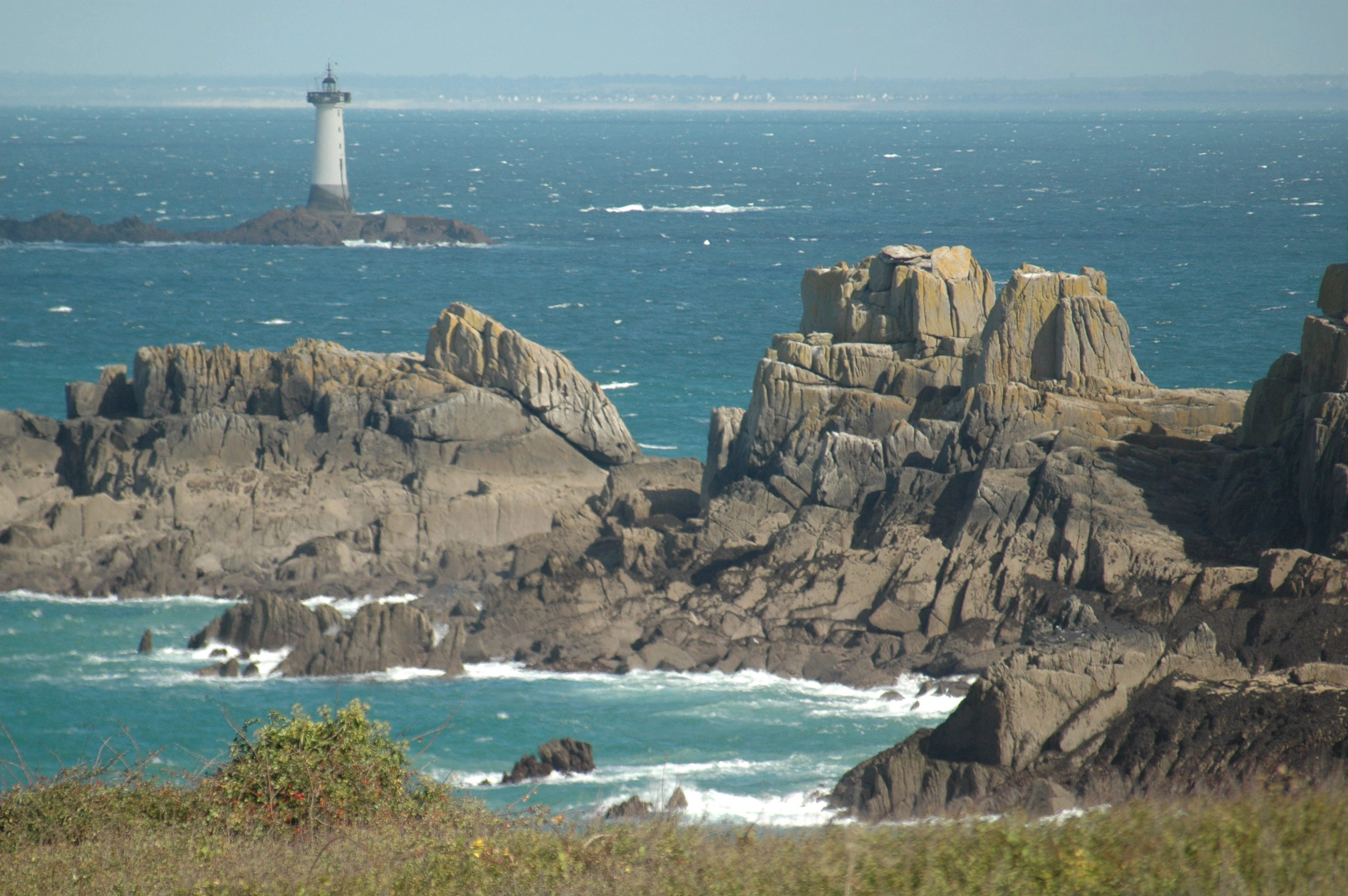
The rocky headlands at the Pointe du Grouin with Granville beyond

The rocky finger of the Pointe du Grouin points out and protects the entrance into the bay of Mont Saint-Michel.

On this headland, a Grande Randonnée footpath runs around hugging the cliff face and there is a circular walk starting out from Cancale.

On their way, walkers can see the Île des Landes, a long barren outcrop (now a bird sanctuary), the lighthouse, the Îles Chausey, Granville on the Normandy coast, and, on a clear day, the outline of Mont Saint-Michel.

== Climate ==
Climate data for Pointe du Grouin (1961–1990)
Month	Jan	Feb	Mar	Apr	May	Jun	Jul	Aug	Sep	Oct	Nov	Dec	Year
Mean daily maximum °C (°F)	7.9 (46.2)	8.2 (46.8)	10.1 (50.2)	12.1 (53.8)	15.2 (59.4)	17.9 (64.2)	20.2 (68.4)	20.6 (69.1)	19.1 (66.4)	15.7 (60.3)	11.4 (52.5)	9.0 (48.2)	14.0 (57.2)
Daily mean °C (°F)	5.8 (42.4)	6.0 (42.8)	7.6 (45.7)	9.5 (49.1)	12.4 (54.3)	15.0 (59.0)	17.4 (63.3)	17.8 (64.0)	16.3 (61.3)	13.2 (55.8)	9.3 (48.7)	6.9 (44.4)	11.4 (52.5)
Mean daily minimum °C (°F)	3.7 (38.7)	3.8 (38.8)	5.1 (41.2)	6.9 (44.4)	9.5 (49.1)	12.2 (54.0)	14.6 (58.3)	14.9 (58.8)	13.5 (56.3)	10.7 (51.3)	7.1 (44.8)	4.8 (40.6)	8.9 (48.0)
Average precipitation mm (inches)	64.5 (2.54)	57.5 (2.26)	55.8 (2.20)	45.6 (1.80)	53.9 (2.12)	47.5 (1.87)	41.1 (1.62)	39.3 (1.55)	55.6 (2.19)	69.5 (2.74)	79.0 (3.11)	71.6 (2.82)	680.9 (26.81)
Average precipitation days (≥ 1.0 mm)	13.0	10.7	11.3	9.2	9.7	7.6	6.4	7.1	9.0	10.7	13.1	12.6	120.6
Average snowy days	1.3	1.9	0.7	0.3	0.0	0.0	0.0	0.0	0.0	0.0	0.3	0.7	5.1
Average relative humidity (%)	86	84	83	82	83	84	83	82	82	84	84	86	84
Source: Infoclimat.fr
