= Auguste Feyen-Perrin =

French painter, engraver and illustrator

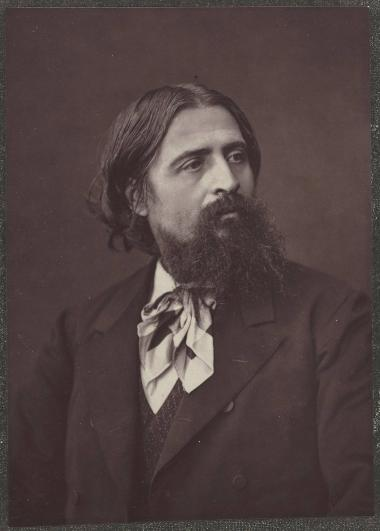
Auguste Feyen-Perrin (date unknown)

François Nicolas Augustin Feyen, known as Auguste Feyen-Perrin (12 April 1826 – 14 October 1888) was a French painter, engraver and illustrator. He added his mother's maiden name to Feyen to help distinguish himself from his older brother, Jacques-Eugène Feyen, who was already an established artist when Auguste was only fifteen.

== Biography ==
He was born in Bey-sur-Seille. His father was a tax collector. He had his first art lessons with his older brother, Jacques-Eugène, then attended a drawing school in Nancy. After some private lessons with Michel Martin Drolling, he qualified to enroll at the École des Beaux-arts in 1848, where he studied with Léon Cogniet and Adolphe Yvon.

Specializing in portraits and genre scenes, he had his first exhibition at the Salon of 1853. He continued to exhibit there for most of his life, winning medals in 1865, 1867 and 1874. Once, he gave up the chance to compete for the Prix de Rome to accept a commission painting theater curtains for the Opéra-Comique.

Together with his brother and his friend, Jules Breton, he spent his summers in Cancale; painting scenes from the everyday lives of the Breton peasantry. Many of his works were acquired by public institutions.

He was a close friend of Gustave Courbet and worked with him at two organizations Courbet presided over during the Franco-Prussian War: the Museum Commission and the Federation of Artists, created in 1871 during the Paris Commune. Despite this potentially compromising activity, he maintained his respectability with the Republican establishment and was decorated with the Légion d'Honneur in 1878.

He died in 1888 in Paris. His tomb in Montmartre Cemetery was adorned with a monument by the sculptor, Ernest Guilbert, in 1892.

== Selected paintings ==
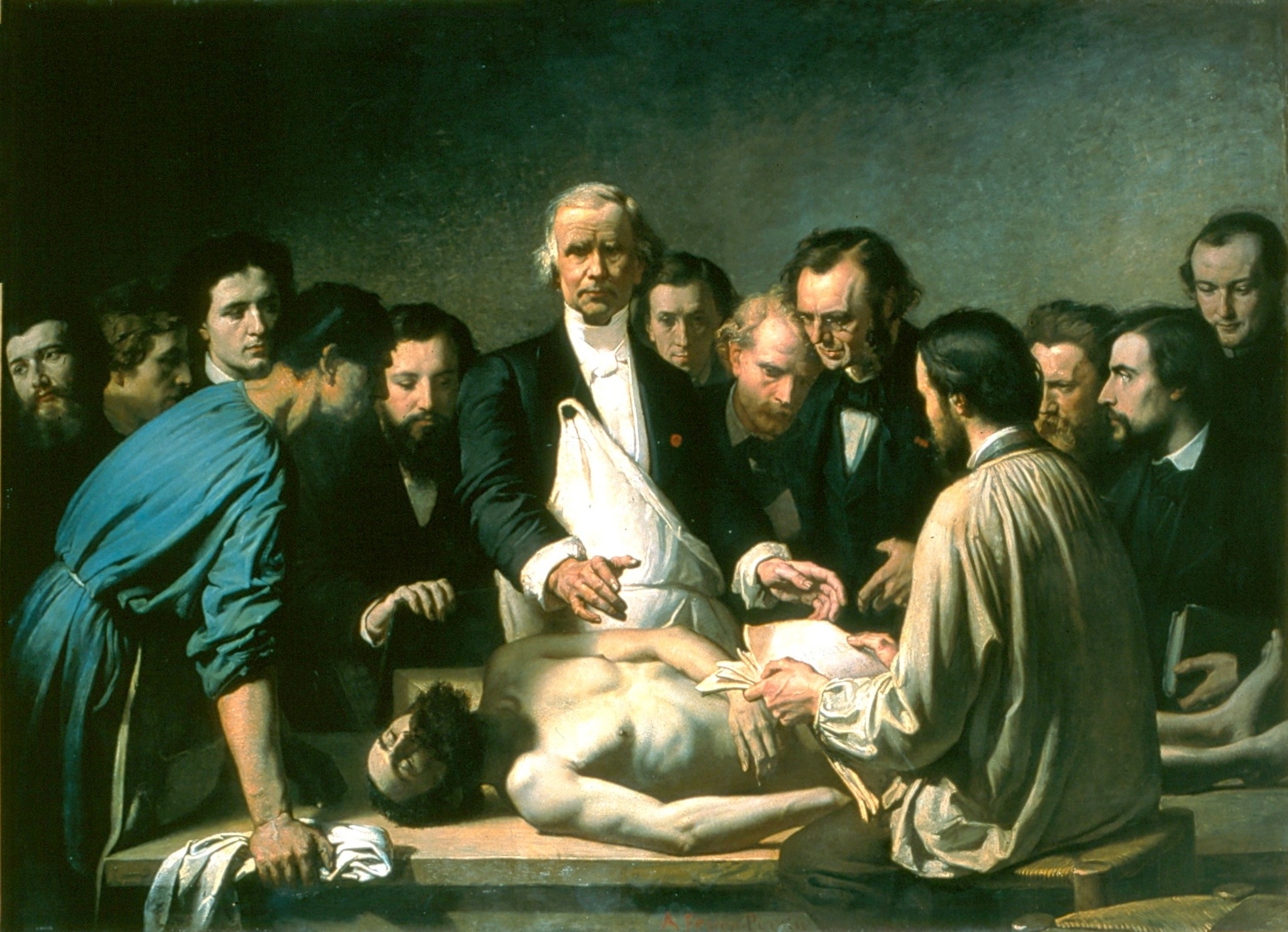
The Anatomy Lesson of Dr. Velpeau
at the Charité

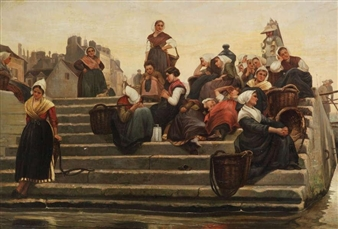
Awaiting the Fishermen's Return

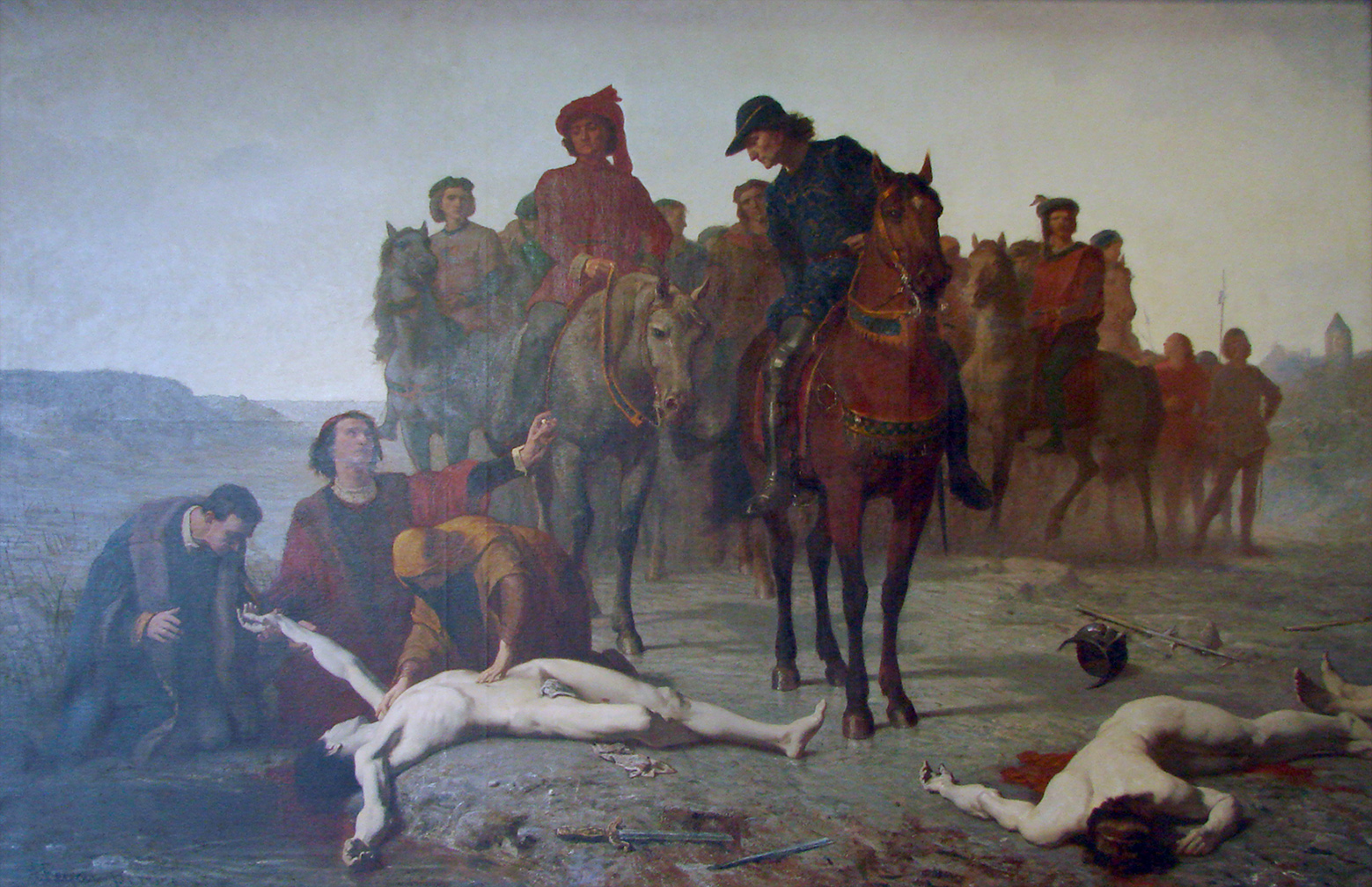
Charles the Bold Found After the
Battle of Nancy
