= Jacques-Eugène Feyen =

French painter

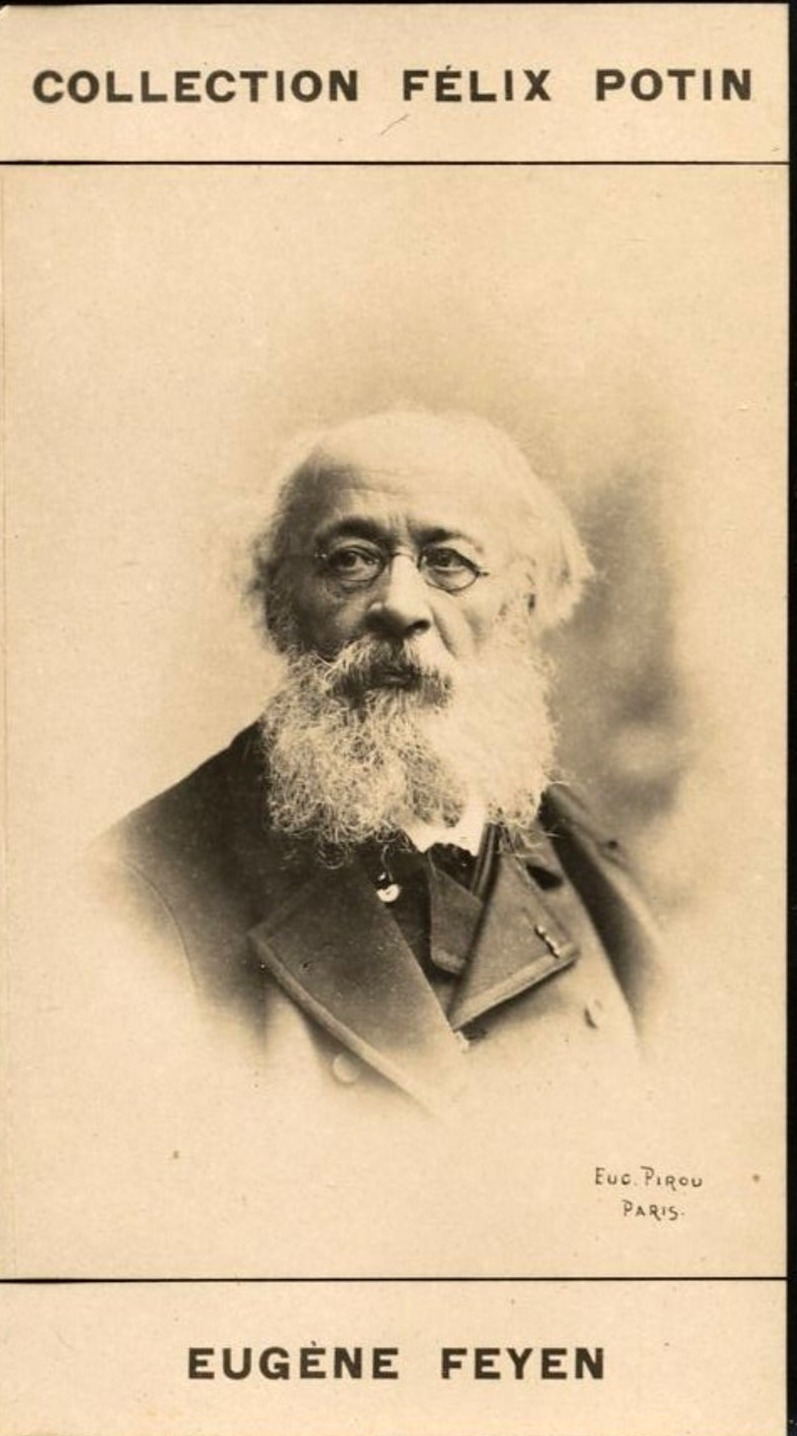
Feyen c. 1900

Jacques-Eugène Feyen (1815–1908) was a French painter.

== Career ==
The elder brother of painter Auguste Feyen-Perrin, Jacques-Eugène was born in Bey-sur-Seille, Meurthe-et-Moselle. He enrolled at the École des Beaux-Arts and studied under Paul Delaroche. He had a notable career at the Paris Salon from 1841 to 1882. Vincent van Gogh was a fan of Feyen and describes him as, "one of the few painters who pictures intimate modern life as it really is, and does not turn it into fashion plates." He set up studio and settled in summer in the town of Cancale. He spent several months every year painting views of Cancale, the oyster-picking Cancalaises and the bay of Mont Saint-Michel, and his paintings still enjoy a steady fame. Feyen died in Paris in 1908.

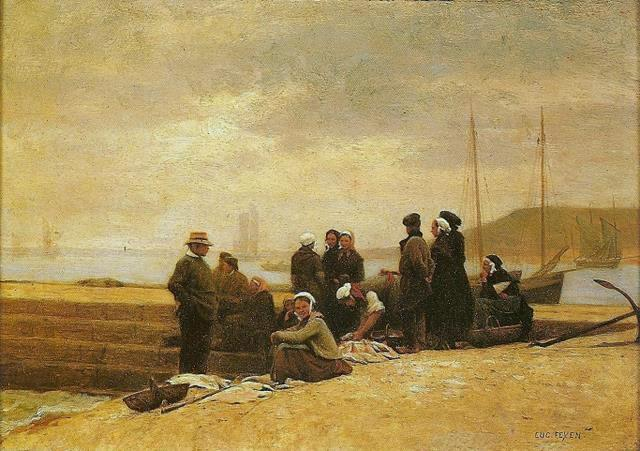
Women and fishermen waiting for the boat (ca. 1860). Rio de Janeiro, Itamaraty Palace.

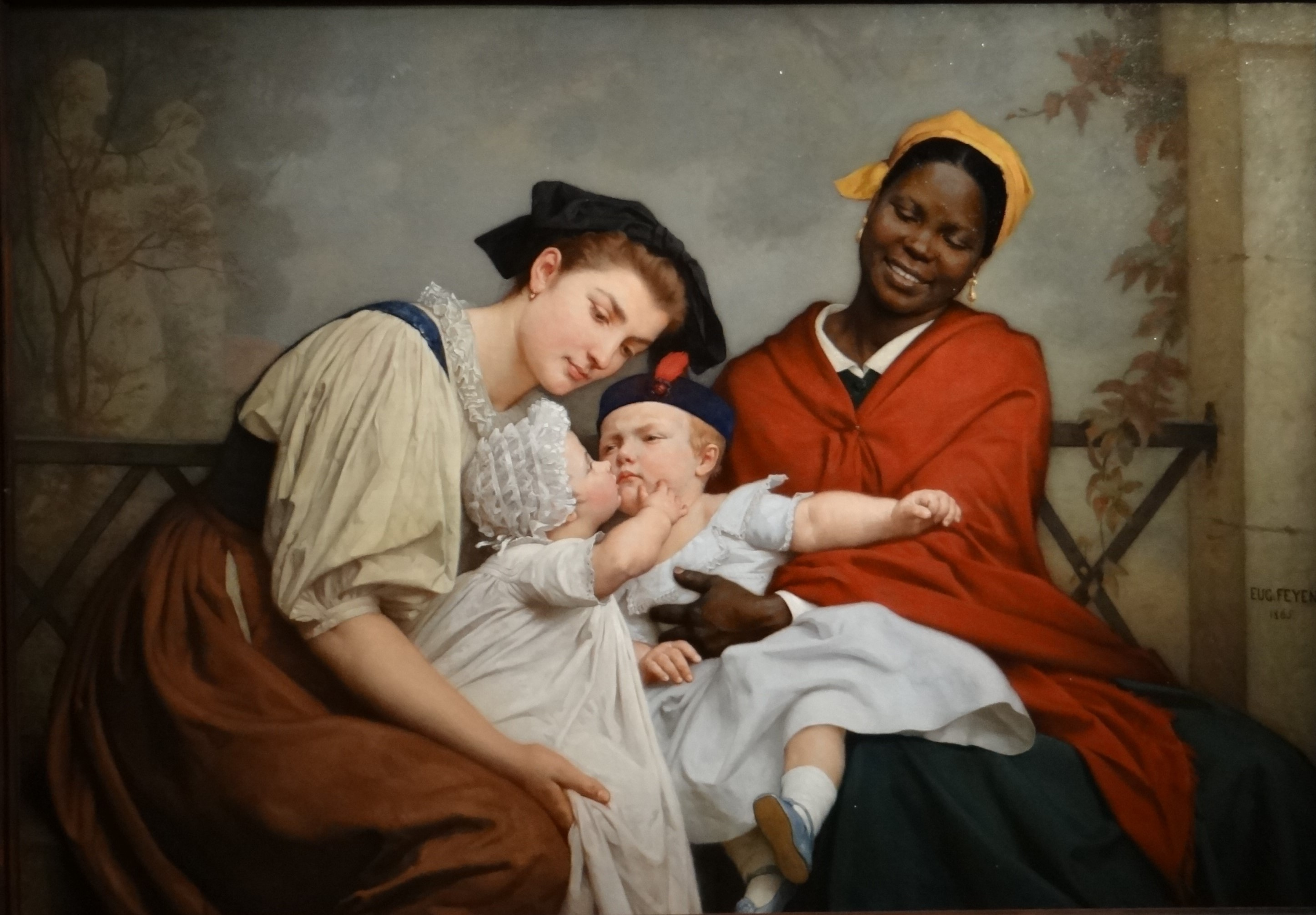
Le Baiser enfantin (1865), Palais des Beaux-Arts de Lille.

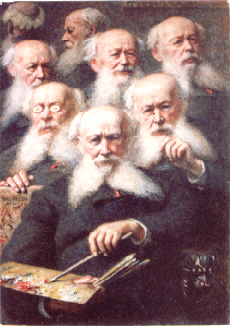
(Attributed), Multi selfportrait (1906), Metz, unsourced private collection.
