= Cancale =

Cancale Cauncall (Gallo) Kankaven (Breton)
- Commune
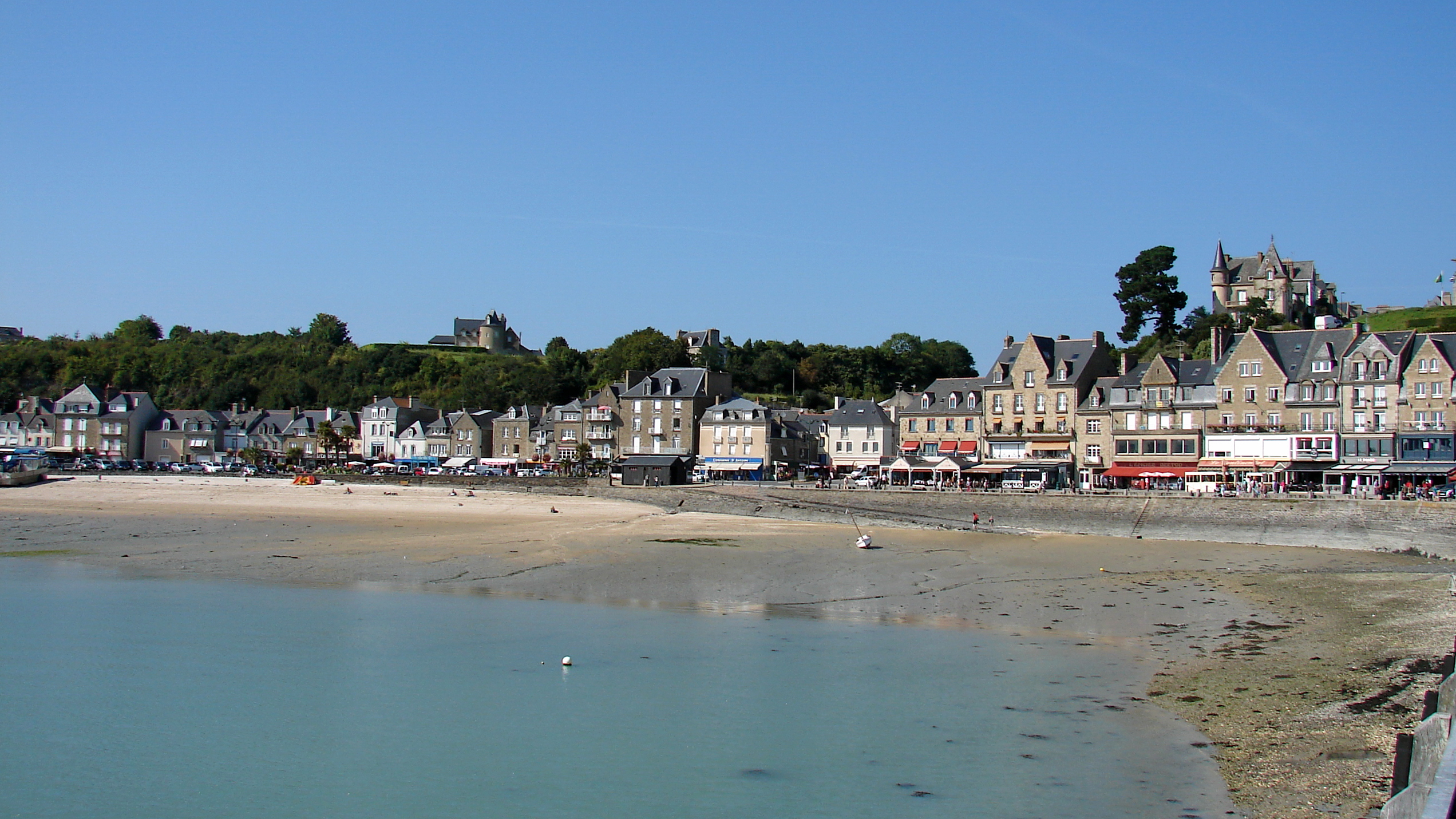
- Cancale, Port de la Houle

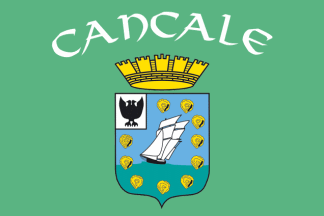
- Flag Coat of arms
- Location of Cancale
- Location within France Location within Brittany
- Coordinates: 48°40′37″N 1°51′02″W
- Country: France
- Region: Brittany
- Department: Ille-et-Vilaine
- Arrondissement: Saint-Malo
- Canton: Saint-Malo-1
- Intercommunality: CA Pays de Saint-Malo

Government
  - Mayor (2020–2026): Pierre-Yves Mahieu
- Area^{1}: 12.6 km^{2} (4.9 sq mi)
- Elevation: 45 m (148 ft)
- Highest elevation: 56 m (184 ft)
- Lowest elevation: 0 m (0 ft)
- Population (2023): 5,672
  - Density: 450/km^{2} (1,170/sq mi)
- Time zone: UTC+01:00 (CET)
  - Summer (DST): UTC+02:00 (CEST)
- INSEE/Postal code: 35049 /35260
- ^{1} French Land Register data, which excludes lakes, ponds, glaciers > 1 km^{2} (0.386 sq mi or 247 acres) and river estuaries.

Cancale (French pronunciation: [kɑ̃kal]; Breton: Kankaven; Gallo: Cauncall) is a commune in the Ille-et-Vilaine department in Brittany in northwestern France. It is known as the birthplace of Saint Jeanne Jugan.

== Population ==
Inhabitants of Cancale are called Cancalais in French.

Historical population
Year	Pop.	±% p.a.
1968	5,019	—
1975	4,780	−0.69%
1982	4,638	−0.43%
1990	4,910	+0.71%
1999	5,203	+0.65%
2007	5,293	+0.21%
2012	5,231	−0.24%
2017	5,121	−0.42%
2023	5,672	+1.72%
Source: INSEE

== Geography ==
=== Location ===
Cancale is located at the western end of the bay of Mont-Saint-Michel, on the coasts of Ille-et-Vilaine (Côte d'Émeraude), fifteen kilometers east of Saint-Malo. The bay of Cancale is delimited by the pointe des Roches Noires in the south and the pointe des Crolles in the north.

Cartographic representations of Cancale

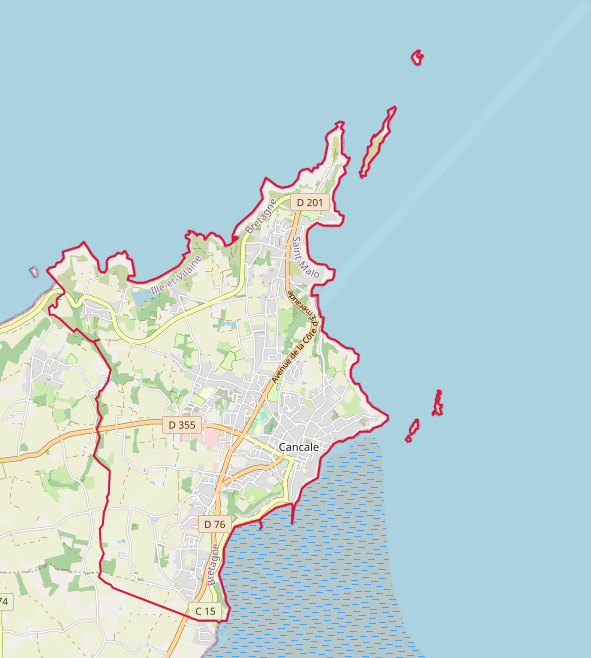
Carte OpenStreetMap.

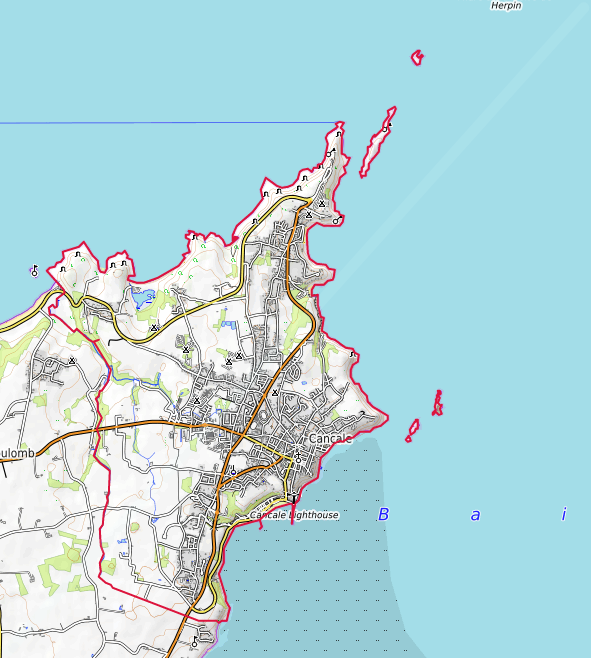
Carte topographique.

== Tourism ==
The Boat Builder's Yard, Cancale, Brittany

Cancale lies along the coast to the east of Saint-Malo. It is a picturesque fishing port popular with visitors, many of whom are drawn by its reputation as the "oyster capital" of Brittany. Though a small town, Cancale includes a large number of restaurants. Many of these restaurants specialise in seafood. There are many stalls and vendors located in this town as well, which can also sell various types of seafood and crustaceans.

The oyster market (marché aux huîtres) at the harbour at the end of Quai de l'Administrateur en Chef Thomas offers a wide variety of local oysters at producer prices. At low tide part of the vast oyster beds can visited.

There is a pleasant coastal path which permits a circular walk from the town to the Pointe du Grouin with views across the bay towards Mont Saint-Michel.

Eugène Feyen painted Cancale and the inhabitants with the oyster-picking Cancalaises for several decades around 1865–1908. Vincent van Gogh wrote that "Eugène Feyen is one of the few painters who pictures intimate modern life as it is really, and does not turn it into fashion plates".

John Singer Sargent featured Cancale in his works: Fishing for Oysters at Cancale and Low tide at Cancal Harbour

== Oysters ==
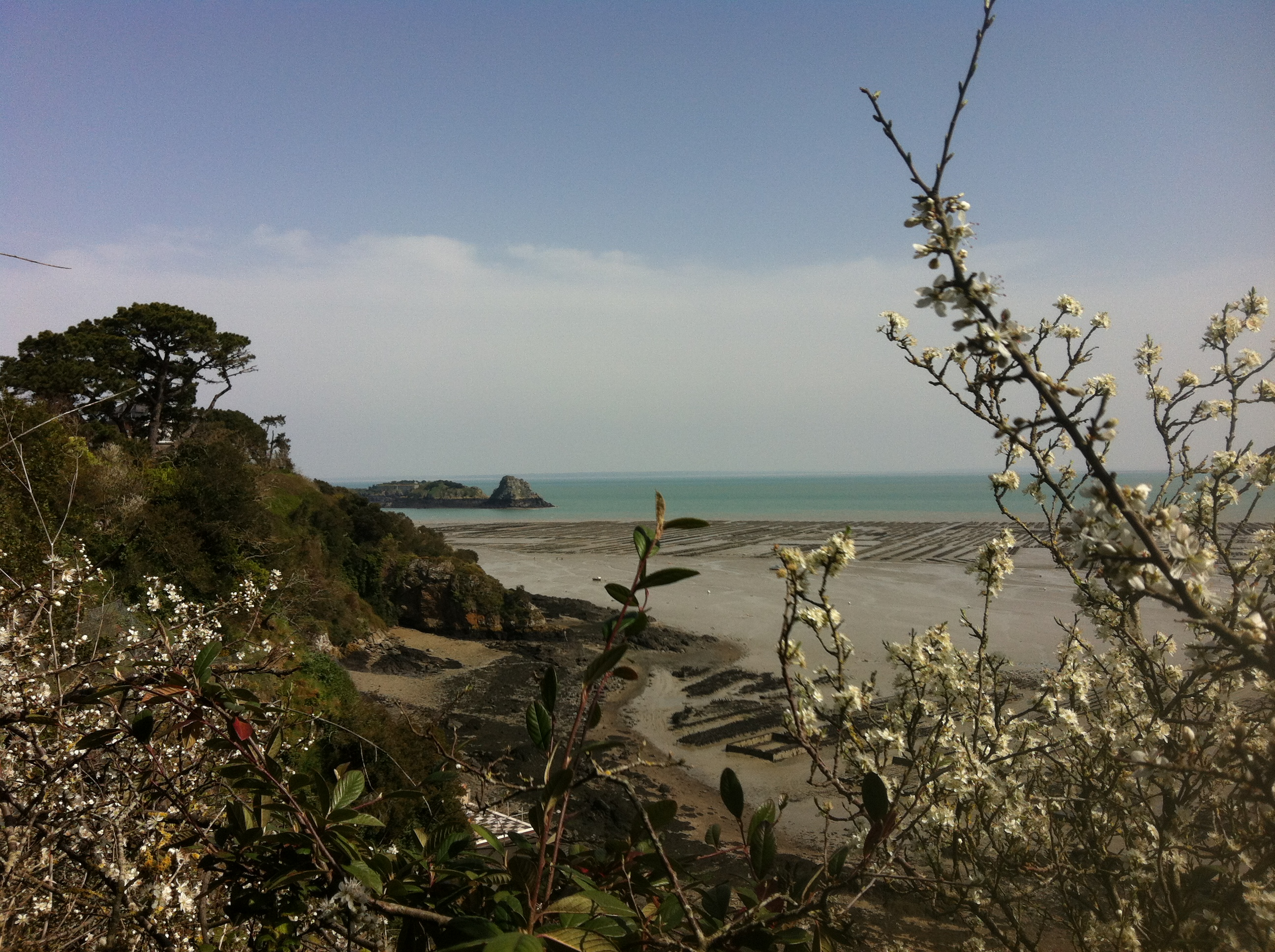
Oyster farms in springtime

History has it that Louis XIV had his oysters brought to Versailles from Cancale. Centuries later, the farming of oysters is still a major activity in the port and there are oyster beds covering about 7.3 square kilometres easily seen from the pier at the harbour. These beds harvest about 25,000 tons of oysters each year.

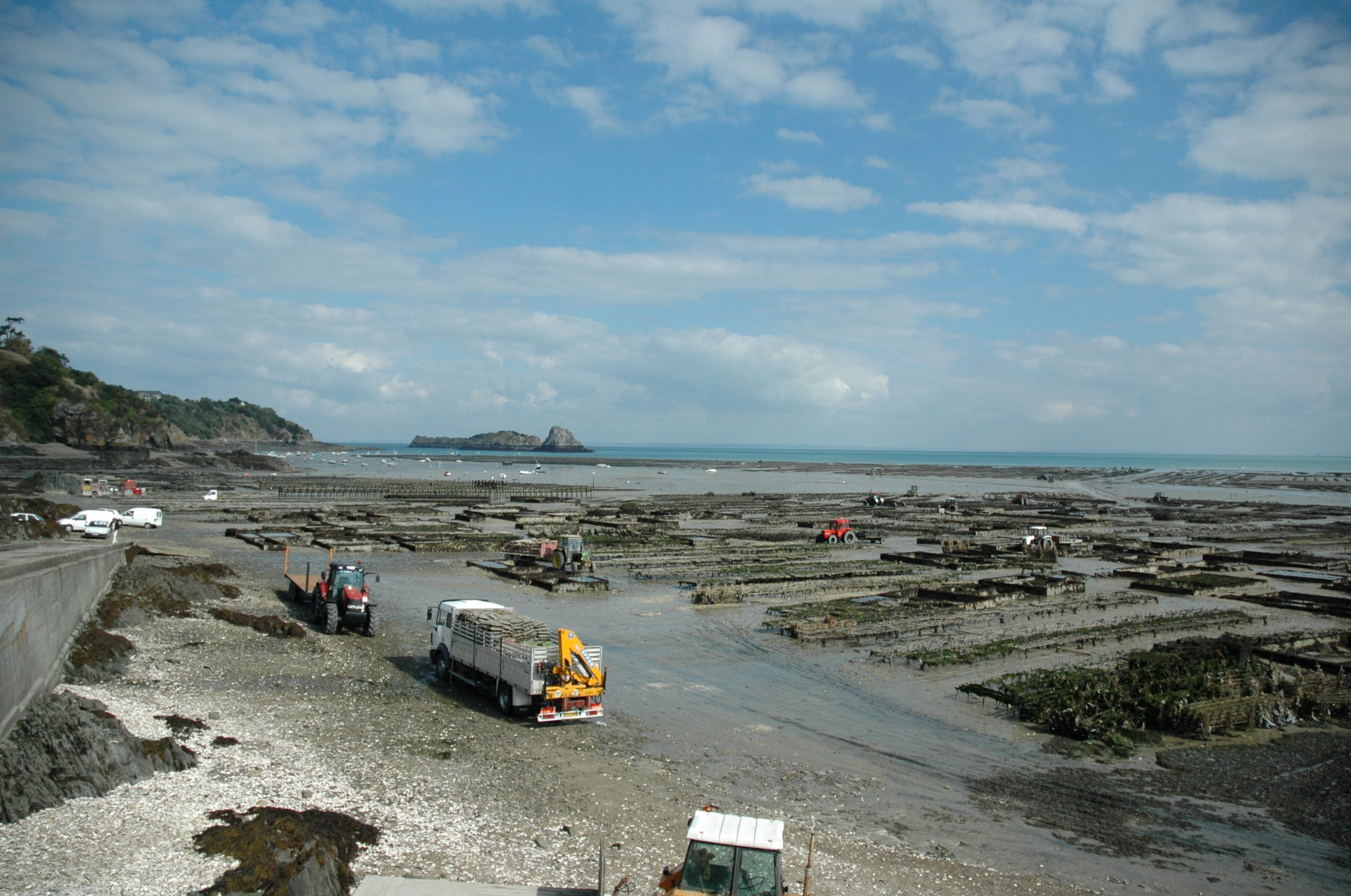
Harvesting oysters from the pier at Cancale, 2005

== International relations ==
Cancale is twinned with:

- Arnstein, Germany (since 7 September 1988)
- (United Kingdom) Saint Clement, Jersey (since 2010)

Historically, its position made it vulnerable to British attack during the Seven Years' War. In 1758 a British army under the Duke of Marlborough landed here for the purpose of attacking Saint-Malo, and pillaged the town. It was again bombarded by the English in 1779.

== Climate ==
Climate data for Cancale (1981–1998 normals, extremes 1944–1998)
Month	Jan	Feb	Mar	Apr	May	Jun	Jul	Aug	Sep	Oct	Nov	Dec	Year
Record high °C (°F)	16.0 (60.8)	18.8 (65.8)	21.2 (70.2)	26.0 (78.8)	27.2 (81.0)	32.7 (90.9)	36.2 (97.2)	32.2 (90.0)	31.4 (88.5)	30.2 (86.4)	19.2 (66.6)	17.0 (62.6)	36.2 (97.2)
Mean daily maximum °C (°F)	8.3 (46.9)	8.3 (46.9)	10.7 (51.3)	12.3 (54.1)	15.6 (60.1)	18.2 (64.8)	20.6 (69.1)	21.1 (70.0)	19.1 (66.4)	15.7 (60.3)	11.6 (52.9)	9.3 (48.7)	14.3 (57.7)
Daily mean °C (°F)	6.3 (43.3)	6.1 (43.0)	8.3 (46.9)	9.7 (49.5)	12.8 (55.0)	15.4 (59.7)	17.8 (64.0)	18.4 (65.1)	16.4 (61.5)	13.3 (55.9)	9.5 (49.1)	7.3 (45.1)	11.8 (53.2)
Mean daily minimum °C (°F)	4.2 (39.6)	3.9 (39.0)	6.0 (42.8)	7.1 (44.8)	10.1 (50.2)	12.6 (54.7)	15.1 (59.2)	15.7 (60.3)	13.8 (56.8)	11.0 (51.8)	7.5 (45.5)	5.3 (41.5)	9.4 (48.9)
Record low °C (°F)	−10.6 (12.9)	−9.0 (15.8)	−4.2 (24.4)	0.8 (33.4)	1.0 (33.8)	6.2 (43.2)	10.0 (50.0)	9.2 (48.6)	6.6 (43.9)	2.6 (36.7)	−3.0 (26.6)	−7.2 (19.0)	−10.6 (12.9)
Average precipitation mm (inches)	65.2 (2.57)	55.4 (2.18)	47.5 (1.87)	47.1 (1.85)	57.7 (2.27)	54.5 (2.15)	39.7 (1.56)	40.9 (1.61)	65.1 (2.56)	79.6 (3.13)	69.4 (2.73)	78.0 (3.07)	700.1 (27.56)
Average precipitation days (≥ 1.0 mm)	12.3	9.7	11.1	9.6	9.5	8.3	6.8	7.0	9.8	12.3	12.2	12.8	121.4
Source: Meteociel

== See also ==
- Communes of the Ille-et-Vilaine department
- Auguste Feyen-Perrin
- Jacques-Eugène Feyen
- The works of Jean Fréour Sculptor of statue depicting Cancale women washing oysters.
