= Márcio Borges =

Brazilian footballer

Personal information
- Date of birth: 20 January 1973 (age 53)
- Place of birth: Rio de Janeiro, Brazil
- Height: 1.80 m (5 ft 11 in)
- Position: Defender

Senior career*
Years	Team	Apps	(Gls)
–1997	Botafogo		
1997–1998	Yverdon-Sport		
1998–1999	Waldhof Mannheim		
1999–2007	Arminia Bielefeld	140	(8)
Total		140	(8)
- * Club domestic league appearances and goals

Márcio Borges (born on 20 January 1973 in Rio de Janeiro) is a Brazilian former professional footballer who played as a defender. He started his career playing for the Botafogo youth team. In Europe he played for Swiss side Yverdon-Sport and German clubs Waldhof Mannheim and Arminia Bielefeld. He retired in September 2007.
