= Eldkvarn (band) =

Swedish rock band

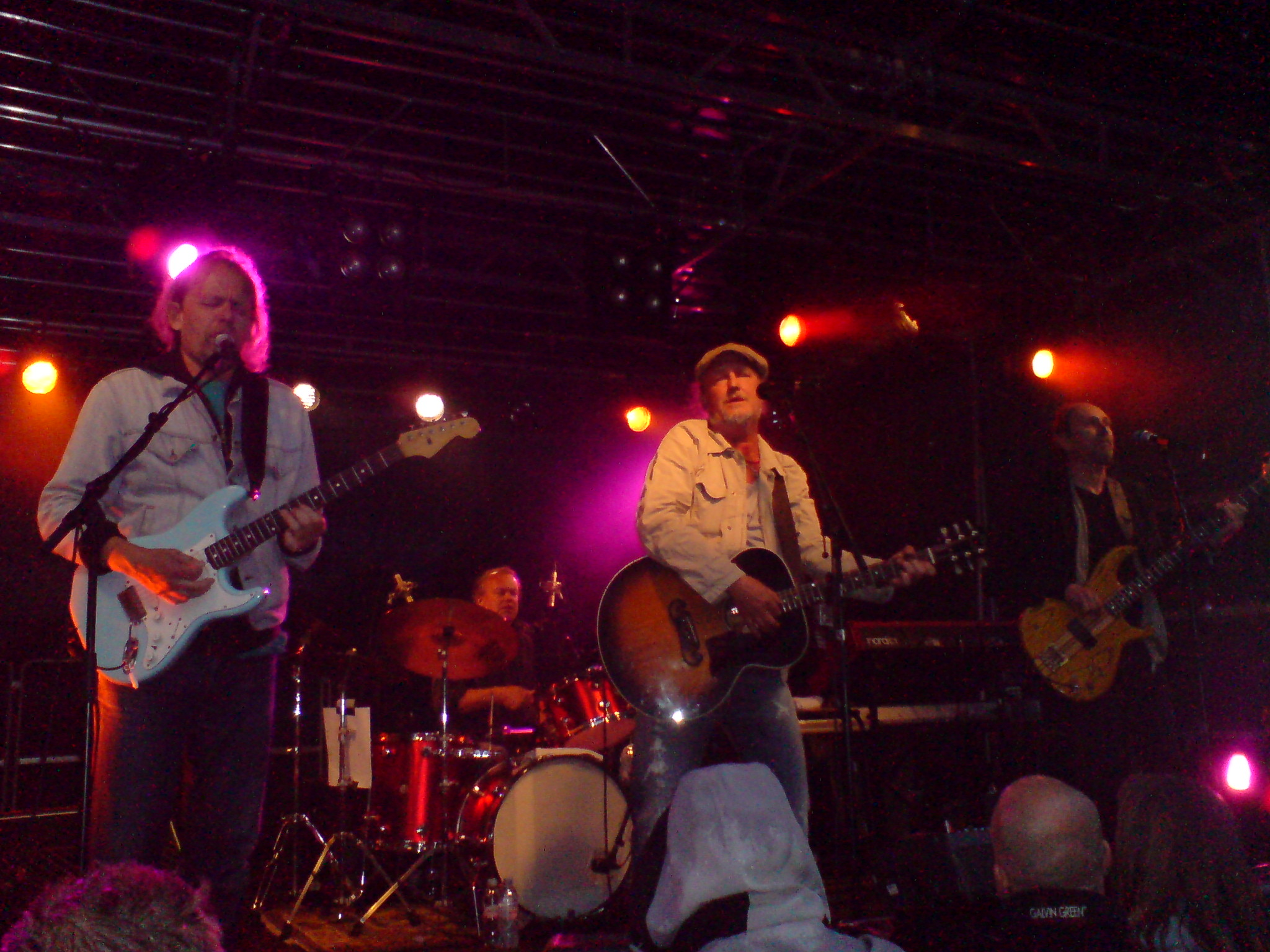
- Eldkvarn performing in July 69, from left to right: Carla Jonsson, Werner Modiggård, Plura Jonsson, Tony Thorén and Claes von Heijne (obscured)

Background information
- Origin: Norrköping, Sweden
- Genres: Rock
- Years active: 1971–present
- Labels: MNW; EMI; Capitol
- Members: Plura Jonsson; Carla Jonsson; Tony Thorén; Werner Modiggård; Claes von Heijne
- Past members: (see Personnel section for others)

Eldkvarn is a Swedish rock band formed in Norrköping in 1971. The group, whose best-known line-up comprises Plura Jonsson, Carla Jonsson and Tony Thorén, as well as other artists, are regarded as one of the best rock bands in Sweden, with a following in other Nordic countries as well.

The band has made more than 20 full-length LP and CDs.

== History ==
=== 1970s ===
The Jonsson brothers and Tony Thorén began playing together in Norrköping in 1971 under the name "Piska mig hårt". The name was not entirely uncontroversial, and one of the band's gigs was advertised under the name "Blixt & dunder". The members eventually moved to Stockholm and the band was based around one of the many collectives of that time. In February 1974, the band was recorded by the radio program Tonkraft. Through contact with members of Blå Tåget, the band got in touch with the record company MNW and got to record an LP there. The album was not a great success however, and in the music movement, the introverted band with a strange name and not very political lyrics was often seen as a foreign bird.

The band was reorganized a few years later.

== Personnel ==
Current members

- Plura Jonsson – vocals, guitars (1971–present)
- Carla Jonsson – guitars, vocals (1971–present)
- Tony Thorén – vocals, bass (1971–present)
- Werner Modiggård – drums, vocals (1979–1984, 1995–present)
- Claes von Heijne – keyboards (1984, 1987–1991, 1995–present)

Former members

- Staffan Odenhall – saxophone (1972–1974)
- Curt-Åke Stefan – guitar, keyboards (1971–1979)
- Wenche Arnesen – vocals (1975–1979)
- Liten Falkeholm – xylofon, keyboards, vocals (1975–1979)
- Lage Bergström – drums (1974–1978)
- Claes Carlsson – saxophone, keyboards (1979–1984)
- Lennart Helperin – trumpet (1982–1984)
- Fredric "Fralle" Holmquist – keyboards (1985–1986)
- Peter Smoliansky – drums (1985–1992)
- Magnus Persson – drums (1993–1994)

== Discography ==
- En lång het weekend (1977)
- Pantad och såld (1978)
- Pojkar, pojkar, pojkar (1979)
- Musik för miljonärer (1980)
- Genom ljuva livet (1981)
- Tuff lust (1983)
- Barbariets eleganter (1984)
- Ny klubb (1984)
- Utanför lagen (1986)
- Himmelska dagar (1987)
- Kungarna från Broadway (1988)
- Karusellkvällar (1989)
- Legender ur den svarta hatten (1991)
- Pluralism (1993)
- Sånger från Nedergården (1994)
- Lyckliga tider (1997)
- Limbo (1999)
- Död stjärna (2001)
- Brott lönar sig alltid (2002)
- Atlantis (2005)
- Svart blogg (2007)
- Hunger Hotell (2008)
- De berömdas aveny (2011)
