= Det sjungande trädet (album) =

Det Sjungande Trädet

Studio album by Mauro Scocco
- Released: 1991
- Genre: Instrumental piano music
- Label: Diesel Music

Mauro Scocco chronology
Dr. Space Dagbok (1991)	Det Sjungande Trädet (1991)	Ciao! (1992)

Det Sjungande Trädet (The Singing Tree) is the third solo album of Swedish pop music artist Mauro Scocco. This album diverges from his other albums in that it consists of instrumental songs played on the piano, quite different from his regular pop music.

== Track listing ==
1. "Hemkomsten" – 1.20
2. "Det Sjungande Trädet" – 2.18
3. "Paul Klee" – 2.04
4. "Metropolis" – 2.13
5. "Lucias Bröllop" – 2.21
6. "Beatrice" – 1.42
7. "Persona" – 1.26
8. "Stella" – 2.38
9. "Den Blå Ängeln" – 1.40
10. "Jeanne D'arc" – 2.38
