= Hits (Mauro Scocco album) =

Greatest hits album by Mauro Scocco
- Released: 12 November 1997
- Genre: Pop
- Label: Diesel Music (Sweden); Hollywood (U.S./Canada)

Mauro Scocco chronology
Godmorgon Sverige (1994)	Hits (1997)	Tillbaks Till Världen (1997)

Professional ratings
Review scores
Source	Rating
Aftonbladet	4/5 stars

Hits is the first greatest hits album by Swedish pop music artist Mauro Scocco. It was released in 1997 through Scocco's own record label Diesel Music and Hollywood Records in the United States and Canada. The album was released on CD and does not appear on streaming services such as Spotify or TIDAL.

It also included the previously unreleased song "Långsamt Farväl". One version also came with a bonus CD. The album peaked at number 12 on the Swedish Albums Chart.

== Track listing ==
=== Disc one ===
1. "Sarah" – 4:31
2. "Vem Är Han" – 3:38
3. "Hem Till Stockholm" – 3:29
4. "Ingen Vinner" – 3:23
5. "Det Finns" – 4:10
6. "Någon Som Du" – 4:01
7. "Till Dom Ensamma" – 5:00
8. "Om Du Var Min" – 6:31
9. "Nelly" – 4:13
10. "Mitt Liv" – 4:19
11. "Överallt" – 4:12
12. "Gå Samma Väg" – 3:34
13. "Hel Igen" – 5:26
14. "Om Det Är O.K." – 3:59
15. "Kärleken Var Här" – 4:13
16. "Långsamt Farväl" – 4:56

=== Disc two (bonus CD) ===
1. "Sista Gången Vi Ses" – 3:47
2. "Redo Att Älska" – 4:31
3. "Stella" – 2:40
4. "I Dina Ögon (Rob'n'Raz Remix)" – 3:32
5. "Ingen Vinner (Rob'n'Raz Remix)" – 4:20
6. "Ingen Vinner (Oakland Remix 1991)" – 5:40

== Charts ==
Chart (1997–1999)	Peak position
Swedish Albums (Sverigetopplistan)	12
