= Ratata (band) =

Swedish pop group

- Origin: Stockholm, Sweden
- Genres: Pop
- Years active: 1980–1989; 2002
- Past members: Mauro Scocco; Johan Kling; Johan Ekelund; Heinz Liljedahl; Anders Skog

Ratata was a Swedish pop band formed in Stockholm in 1980. It functioned as a four-piece until 1983, when it was restructured. Johan Ekelund, having played with the band briefly, accepted an invitation and continued with Scocco as a duo until 1989. The duo had a brief comeback in 2002.

== History ==
Mauro Scocco formed the pop group Ratata in 1980 along with a number of classmates while he was still in school: Heinz Liljedahl, Anders Skog and Johan Kling. The name was chosen since it alluded to machine gun fire, being Swedish for "rat-tat-tat". The first single was "För varje dag" ("For each day") in 1981 was followed by a second single "Ögon av is". Both appeared on their self-titled 1982 debut album Ratata. Soon followed Jackie, their second album, including the title track single. When Kling left in 1982, bass player and keyboardist Johan Ekelund joined in. Due to personal projects and the rapidly growing nature of success, the original line-up of Ratata disappeared in 1983 after three years of activity.

Scocco continued to use the name as a duo when he was joined by Johan Ekelund. For studio and live gigs, the duo relied on musicians to aid in the shows. The duo Mauro Scocco and Johan Ekelund continued to have a string of hits and award winning live performances up and until 1989. They proceeded to write and produce for other artists. The duo had a brief comeback in 2002 with the single "Honung" on occasion of release of their compilation album Kollektion.

Johan Ekelund was in various music formations in Täby in the 1970s and the early 1980s, before joining Dave and The Mistakes, a trio started by Dave Nerge and Tove Naess. In 1980 the band released a self-titled mini-album plus the single "Give It To Me Baby / Ordinary Girl". Ekelund played briefly in the Ratata formation starting 1982, before becoming officially a duo with Mauro Scocco (as Ratata).

Ekelund has cooperated with various acts such as The Torpedoes, Anis & Oakland, Stina Nordenstam (in "Memories of a Color" in 1991) and with Anne Linnet on "Tal Til Mig" (1993) amongst others. Other than being a musician, he is sought after as a successful record producer. He remixed "Let It Shine" by Agnetha Fältskog and co-wrote "Himlen runt hörnet" with Scocco for Lisa Nilsson.

== Band members ==
- Mauro Scocco (1980–1989, 2002)
- Johan Kling (1980–1982)
- Johan Ekelund (1983–1989, 2002)
- Heinz Liljedahl (1980–1982)
- Anders Skog (1980–1983)

== Discography ==
(band from 1980 to 1983; subsequently a duo)

=== Studio albums ===
Year	Album	Peak positions	Certification
Year	Album	SWE	Certification
As a band
1982	Ratata	18	
1982	Jackie	–	
As a duo
1983	Äventyr	21	
1984	Paradis	14	
1985	Sent i September	6	
1985	Mellan Dröm och Verklighet	1	SWE: Gold
1989	Människor under molnen	2	SWE: Gold

=== Compilations ===
Year	Album	Peak positions	Certification
Year	Album	SWE	Certification
As a duo
1987	Guld 1981-87	24	SWE: Gold
1988	Svenska Popfavoriter	–	
2002	Kollektion	51	

=== Singles ===
Year	Single	Peak positions	Album
Year	Single	SWE	Album
As a band
1981	"För varje dag"	20	
1982	"Ögon av is"	12	
As a duo
1984	"Någonting"	9	
1986	"Jackie"	19	
1986	"Se dig inte om"	12	
1987	"Så länge vi har varann" (Ratata & Frida)	5	SWE: Gold
1989	"Glad att det är över"	5	SWE: Gold
2002	"Honung"	55	
