= Plura Jonsson =

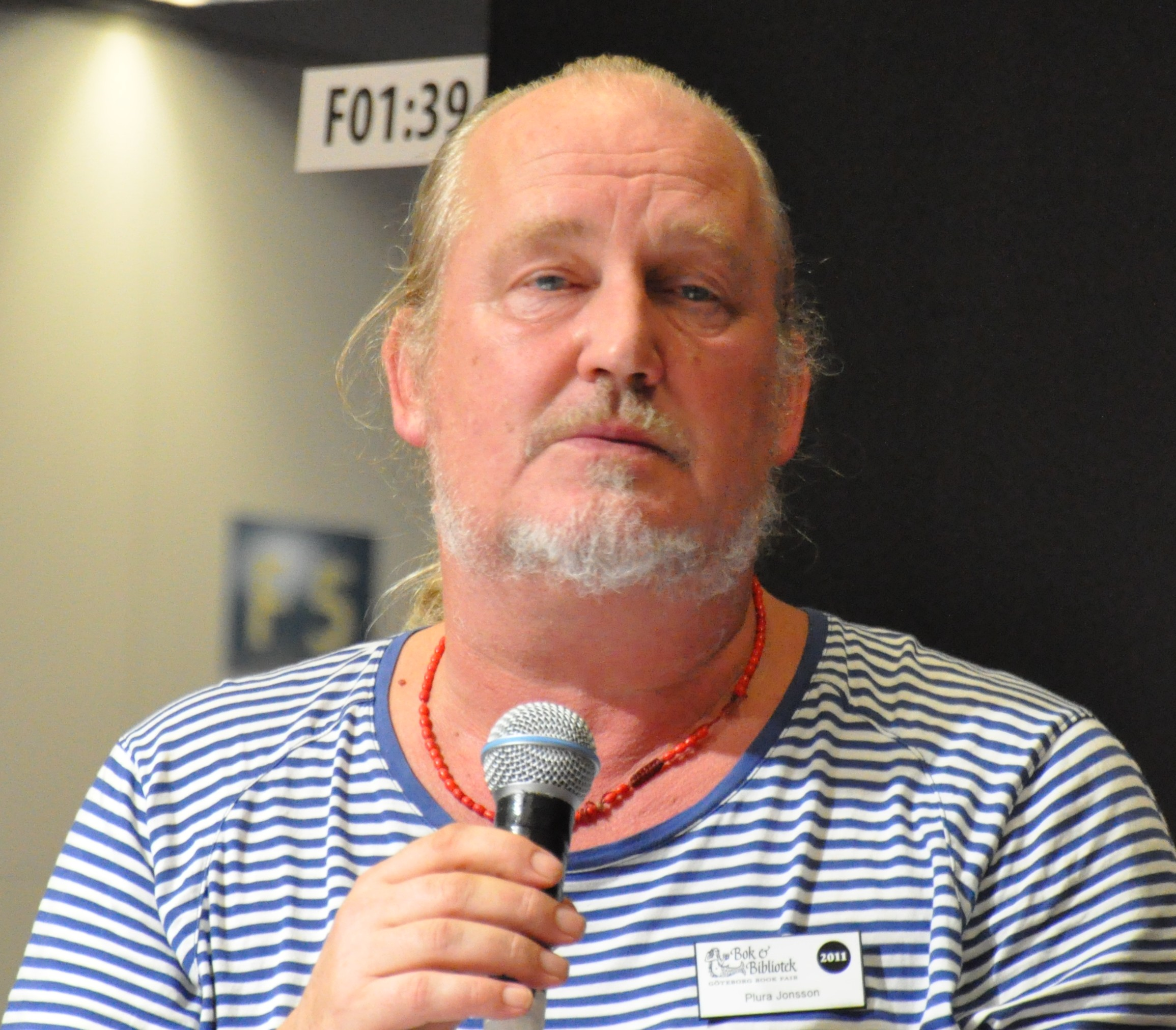
- Jonsson in 2011
- Born: Per Malte Lennart Jonsson; 10 August 1951 (age 74); Norrköping, Sweden
- Occupations: Singer; songwriter; musician; author
- Years active: 1971–present
- Spouse: Maria Sjöstedt (m. 2012)
- Children: 4
- Musical career
- Genres: Rock
- Instruments: Vocals; guitar; harmonica

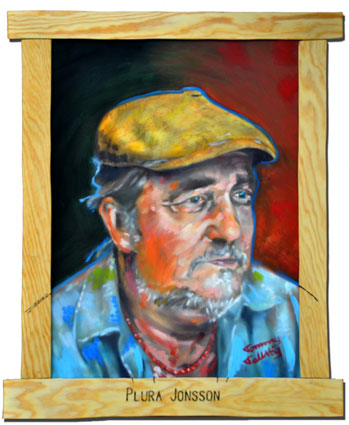
Plura Jonsson portrait by Tommy Tallstig

Per Malte Lennart "Plura" Jonsson (born 10 August 1951) is a Swedish singer, songwriter, and musician. He has been a long-time member of the Swedish rock band Eldkvarn in addition to his solo materials. In 2014, he also released an album jointly with Mauro Scocco as Mauro & Plura. Jonsson has also written several books during his career.

== Solo work ==
In 1996, he released his album Plura from which was taken his single "Sången jag sparade till dig".

== In Eldkvarn ==
Besides his solo work, since the 1970s, he is part of Eldkvarn, a Swedish rock band formed in Norrköping in 1971, consisting of Plura Jonsson, the main songwriter, singer and rhythm guitarist of the band, his brother Carl Jonsson, lead guitarist who also writes songs and is backing vocals and bass player Tony Thorén, who has produced a number of albums by Eldkvarn, as well as other artists. The band is very active and widely regarded as one of the best rock bands in Sweden, with a following in other Nordic countries as well.

== Television ==
Because of his popularity, he has taken part in a number of television productions, most notably the 2008 TV series Vem tror du att du är?. In 2010, he was in the first series of the Swedish TV series Så mycket bättre where a number of artists get together to cooperate and sing interpretations of each other's works.

== Personal life ==
In 2012, he married Maria Sjöstedt, his long-time partner. He has 4 children with three different women.

== Bibliography ==
- Resa genom ensamheten: svart blogg och det ljuva livet, 2008
- Texter & historier från den stora landsvägen, 2008, med bidrag av andra skribenter
- Pluras kokbok: Provence, Kungsholmen, Koster, 2009
- Pluras spanska kokbok: Mallorca, Barcelona, Estocolmo, 2011

== Discography ==
=== Albums ===
Year	Album	Peak positions	Certification
Year	Album	SWE	Certification
1996	Plura	38	

Joint album as Mauro & Plura

Year	Album	Peak positions	Certification
Year	Album	SWE	Certification
2014	Mauro & Pluras Tågluff	8	

=== Singles ===
Year	Single	Peak positions	Album
Year	Single	SWE	Album
1996	"Sången jag sparade till dig"	–	Plura
2008	"En runda i baren" (Lasse Stefanz & Plura)	53	
2008	"Sånger från ensamheten"	–	
2010	"Det hon vill ha"	29	
2010	"Logiskt"	43	

== Filmography ==
=== Television ===
Year	Title	Role	Notes	Ref.
2008	Vem tror du att du är?	Himself		
2010	Mauro & Pluras kök	Himself		
2010	Så mycket bättre	Himself		
2011–15	Pluras kök	Himself		
2014	Mauro & Pluras tågluff	Himself		
2018	Klassfesten	Himself		
2019	Stjärnornas stjärna	Himself		
