= Lisa Nilsson =

Swedish singer

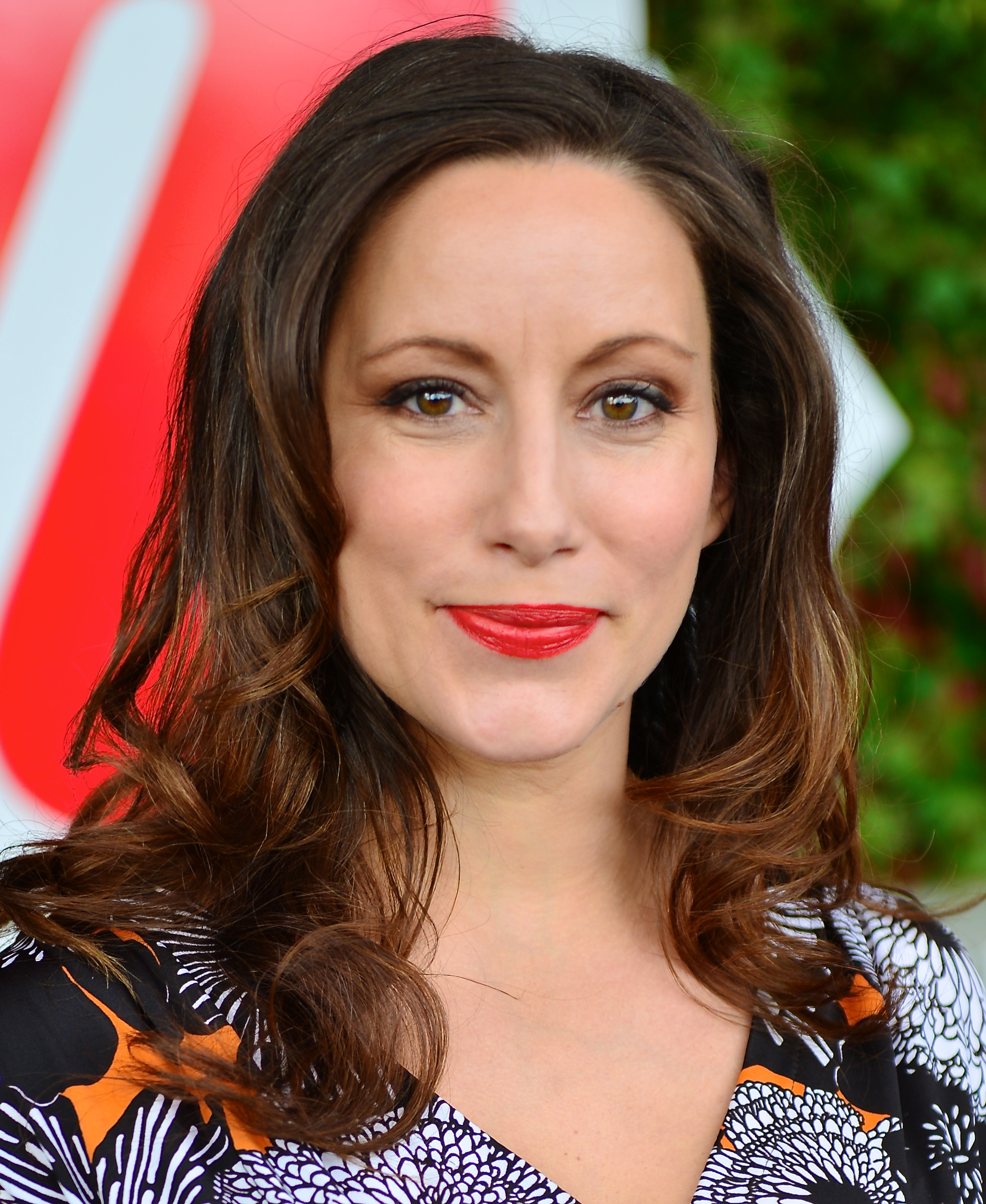
- Nilsson in 2013

Background information
- Born: My Lisa Karolina Nilsson; 13 August 1970 (age 55); Stockholm, Sweden
- Occupation: Singer
- Years active: 1989–present
- Website: lisanilsson.se
- Musical career
- Genres: Pop; jazz
- Instrument: Vocals
- Labels: Diesel Music AB

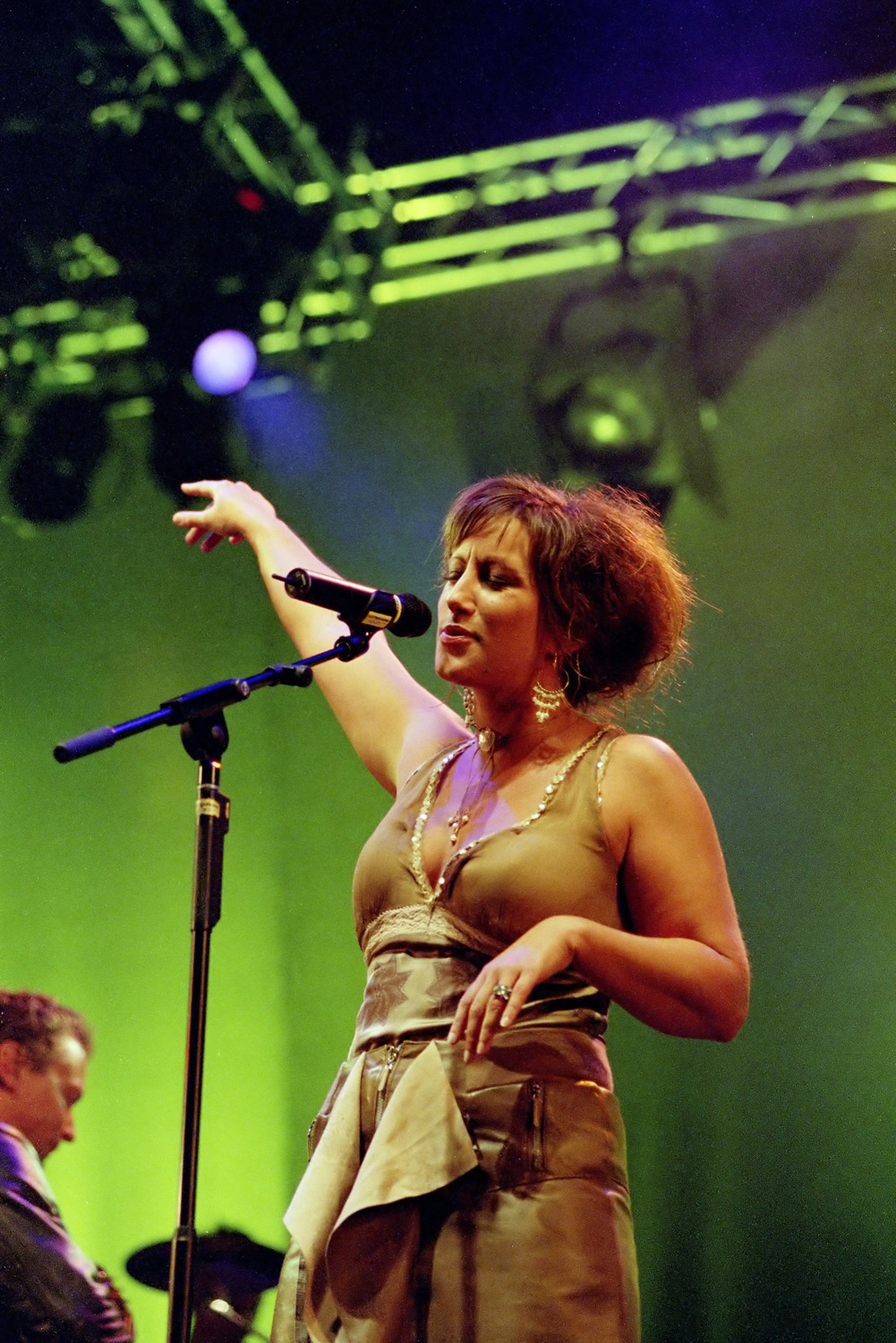
Nilsson live in Malmö, Sweden, 2004

My Lisa Karolina Nilsson (born 13 August 1970) is a Swedish singer.

She was discovered by the producer William (Billy) Butt and she is perhaps best known in Sweden for her 1992 hit, Himlen runt hörnet, written by Mauro Scocco and Johan Ekelund. It was released in English in 1995, titled Ticket to Heaven. She has released four subsequent albums, Till Morelia in 1995, Viva in 2000, Små rum in 2002 and Hotel Vermont 609 in 2006, all in Swedish. A greatest hits compilation, Samlade sånger followed in 2003 and contained two new songs. Prior to Himlen runt hörnet she had released two English language albums, Lean on Love in 1989 and Indestructible in 1991, both released by William Butt. She also participated in Melodifestivalen 1989.

Nilsson's style ranges from out and out pop music to soul-inflected ballads and dance tracks on her earlier albums to a more mature jazz feel in her more recent work, perhaps reflecting familial connections as her father Gösta Nilsson is a jazz pianist.

In 2002, she moved into acting with appearances in the Swedish TV sitcom, Cleo and a role in the Swedish film Paradiset made by British-born director Colin Nutley.

In February 2007 she gave birth to a daughter.

== Discography ==
=== Albums ===
==== Studio albums ====
Year	Album	Peak positions				Certification
Year	Album	SWE	DEN	FIN	NOR	Certification
1989	Lean on Love	–	–	–	–	
1990	Indestructible	–	–	–	–	
1992	Himlen runt hörnet	1	–	–	11	
1995	Ticket to Heaven	–	–	–	–	
1995	Till Morelia	1	–	21	11	
2000	Viva	3	–	28	–	
2001	Små rum	7	11	–	2	
2006	Hotel Vermont 609	1	12	–	19	
2013	Sånger om oss	3	15	27	9	
2025	Uteblivna vi	17	–	–	–	

==== Compilation albums ====
Year	Album	Peak positions			
Year	Album	SWE	DEN	FIN	NOR
2003	Samlade sånger 1992–2003	3	2	6	1
2010	20 – En jubileumssamling	6	3	6	–
2015	Ingen gör det bättre	46	–	–	–

==== Collaborative albums ====
Year	Album	Peak positions	
Year	Album	SWE	FIN
2009	Sambou Sambou (with João Castilho and Sebastian Notini)	28	33

=== Singles ===
Year	Single	Peak positions	Album
Year	Single	SWE	Album
1989	"Aquarius 1999" (with Igor Nikolayev)	—	Lean On Love
1989	"Du (öppnar min värld)"	—	
1989	"How Could I Live Without You"	—	Lean On Love
1990	"Who's That Boy?"	—	Lean On Love
1990	"Say You'll Be Mine"	—	Lean On Love
1990	"Down the Avenue"	—	Indestructible
1990	"Final Call"	—	Indestructible
1992	"Himlen runt hörnet"	2	Himlen runt hörnet
1992	"Varje gång jag ser dig"	5	Himlen runt hörnet
1992	"Allt jag behöver"	—	Himlen runt hörnet
1993	"Aldrig, aldrig, aldrig"	—	Himlen runt hörnet
1994	"Rising to the Top" (with Blacknuss Allstars & Desmond Foster)	—	Made in Sweden
1995	"Den här gången"	22	Till Morelia
1995	"Vad du ser är vad du får"	—	Till Morelia
1995	"Ensam med dig"	—	Till Morelia
1995	"Handens fem fingrar"	—	Till Morelia
1995	"Ingen gör det bättre"	56	
1996	"Those Who Were" (with Niels-Henning Ørsted Pedersen)	—	
1997	"Tears Never Dry" (with Stephen Simmonds)	9	Alone
1997	"Friends Again" (with Montserrat Caballé)	—	Friends for Life
2000	"Tror på dig"	27	Viva
2000	"Kommer du ihåg"	—	Viva
2000	"Två utbrunna ljus"	—	Viva
2001	"Det är bara ord"	—	Små rum
2001	"Små rum"	—	Små rum
2002	"En kort en lång"	—	Samlade sånger 1992–2003
2002	"Mysteriet deg" (with Bjørn Eidsvåg)	28	Samlade sånger 1992–2003
2003	"Långsamt farväl"	16	Samlade sånger 1992–2003
2003	"Mysteriet (Mysteeri)" (with Aki Sirkesalo)	—	Samlade sånger 1992–2003
2003	"Himlen runt hörnet (2003 Remix)"	—	Samlade sånger 1992–2003
2003	"Himlen runt hörnet" (with Mauro Scocco)	—	La dolce vita (Det bästa 1982–2003)
2006	"Regn i Rio"	—	Hotel Vermont 609
2006	"Allt du ville vara"	—	Hotel Vermont 609
2007	"Solen i maj" (with Svante Thuresson)	—	Svante Thuresson & Vänner
2009	"Wave"	—	Sambou Sambou
2013	"Var är du min vän"	—	Sånger om oss
2013	"Sången om oss"	—	Sånger om oss
2014	"Vi tog heldigvis fejl" (with Poul Krebs)	—	Ingen gör det bättre
2015	"I den stora sorgens famn"	—	Ingen gör det bättre
2015	"Innan vi faller" (with Joakim Berg)	102	Ingen gör det bättre
2015	"Vart du än går"	22	Ingen gör det bättre
2015	"När kärleken tar slut"	53	Ingen gör det bättre
2015	"Raised in Rain"	97	Ingen gör det bättre
2018	"Jag saknar Sverige" (with Adrian Modiggård & Allyawan)	—	
2020	"100"	21	Så mycket bättre – Säsong 11
2021	"The Magic Is Real" (with Weeping Willows)	—	Songs Of Winter
2023	"Det är dig jag väntat på" (with Viktor Norén)	—	
2025	"Silverregn"	—	Uteblivna vi
2025	"Livet är en cykeltur"	—	Uteblivna vi
