= Mauro Scocco =

Swedish musician (born 1962)

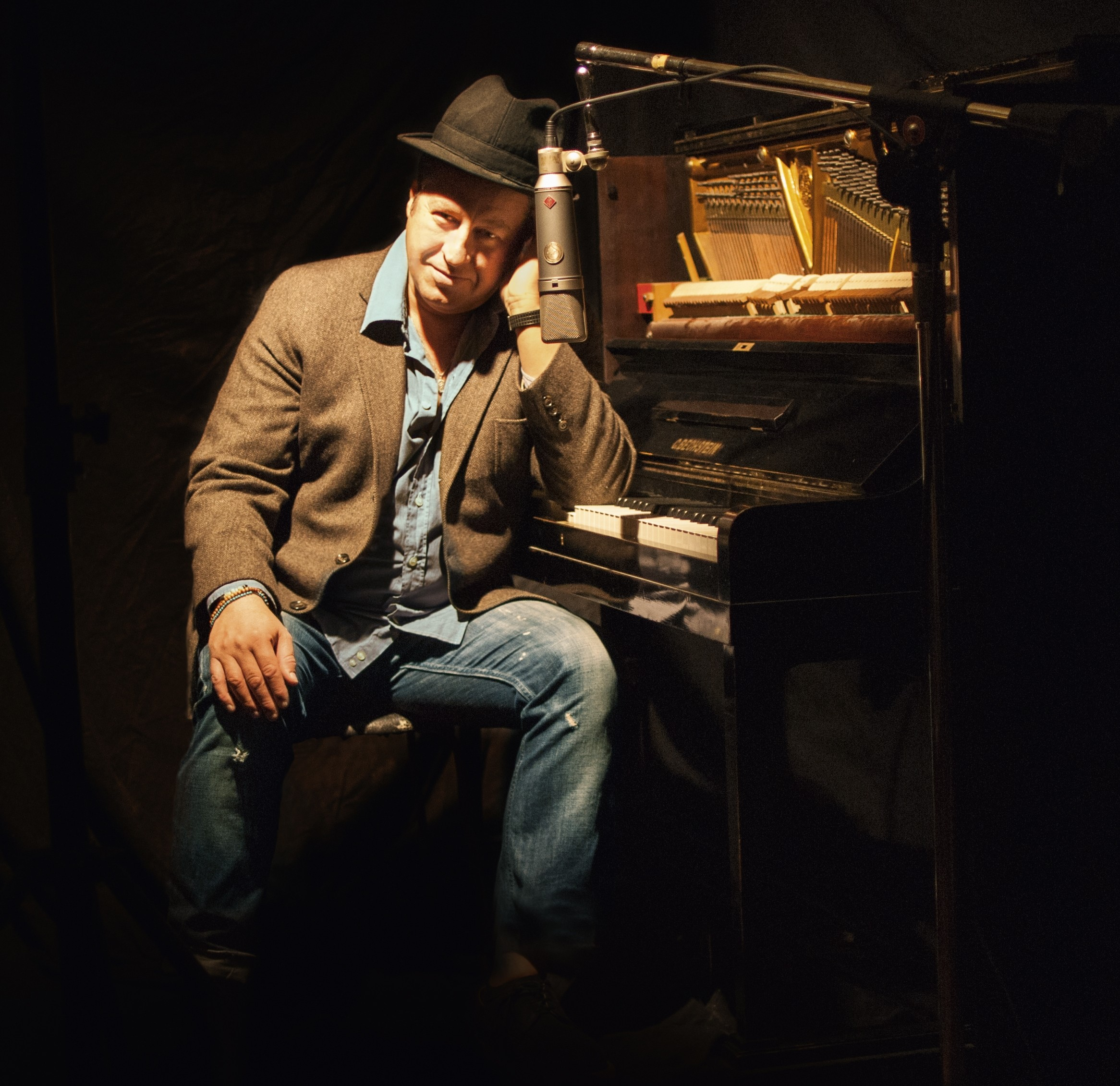
- Scocco in 2012
- Born: Mauro Scocco; 11 September 1962 (age 64); Fristad, Sweden
- Occupations: Musician; songwriter
- Musical career
- Genre: Pop
- Instruments: Vocals; guitar; bass; piano; keyboards
- Years active: 1980–present
- Labels: Diesel; Hollywood; Playground; Record Station

Mauro Scocco (born 11 September 1962) is a Swedish pop musician of Italian descent. He has been described as "one of the sharpest songwriters in Sweden". Scocco was the singer for the pop group Ratata (1980–83) transformed into a duo with Johan Ekelund (1983–89). After Ratata, Scocco has continued as a solo artist since. In 2014, he cooperated with Plura Jonsson releasing a joint album as Mauro & Plura.

== Early life and career ==
Scocco was born in Fristad in Borås. He grew up in Stockholm and in Borås. Scocco formed the pop group Ratata in 1980 along with a few classmates while he was still in school. The first single was "För varje dag" ("For each day") released on the debut album Ratata in 1981. After the break-up of Ratata in 1989 Scocco started a successful solo career and has released many songs that have reached top positions on the Swedish charts; "Sarah", "Vem är han?" ("Who is he?"), "Till de ensamma" ("For the lonely"), "Nelly", "Långsamt farväl" ("Long Goodbye") and "Överallt" ("Everywhere") are among the most recognized. Besides being a solo artist he also writes and produces music for other pop singers, of which Lisa Nilsson is the most famous. Scocco wrote "Himlen runt hörnet" ("Heaven around the corner") for her and it became a hit in Scandinavia in the early 1990s that made her career skyrocket.

In 1991, Scocco released an album with instrumental piano music, Det Sjungande Trädet ("The singing tree"), with inspiration from Erik Satie and expressionistic art. In the spring of 2004, Scocco was a disc jockey in the talkshow Sen kväll med Luuk on TV4, in line with the dry, ironic humour of the show. In the fall of 2005 Scocco released the single "Kall Stjärna" ("Cold star") from the album Herr Jimsons Äventyr ("The adventures of Mr. Jimson"), which made it to the top list over downloaded singles on iTunes.

=== Ratata ===
Mauro Scocco was also a lead singer of the four-piece Swedish band Ratata, formed in 1980, which also included Heinz Liljedahl, Anders Skog, and Johan Kling. Their debut single was "För varje dag" in 1981 followed by "Ögon av is". Both appeared in their self-titled 1982 debut album Ratata. Immediately after release of Jackie, their second album, including the title track as single, Ratata disbanded in 1982 after just three years of activity.

But Scocco continued to use the name as a duo when he was joined by Johan Ekelund. For studio and live gigs, the duo relied on musicians to aid in the shows. The duo continued to have a great number of hit singles and released many more charting albums. The duo had a brief comeback in 2002.

== Personal life ==
Mauro Scocco's brother Sandro Scocco is a well-known Swedish economist.

== Discography ==
For a full discography while in Ratata from 1980 to 1989, refer to band / duo page)

Albums

Year	Album	Peak positions	Certification
Year	Album	SWE	Certification
1988	Mauro Scocco	1	
1991	Dr. Space Dagbok	5	
1991	Det Sjungande Trädet	—	
1992	Ciao!	3	
1994	28 grader i skuggan	1	
1996	Godmorgon Sverige	1	
1999	Tillbaks till världen	3	
2003	Beat Hotel	5	
2005	Herr Jimsons äventyr	4	
2007	Ljudet av tiden som går	5	
2011	Musik för nyskilda	1	
2013	Årets julklapp! (Christmas album)	36	
2020	Den stora glömskan	19	
2026	Livets rytm	8	

Others

- 2007: Saker Som Jag Gjort: texter & noter – prosa & bilder [Book + 3 CDs]

Solo compilations

Year	Album	Peak positions	Certification
Year	Album	SWE	Certification
1997	Hits	12	
2003	La Dolce Vita - Det Bästa 1982-2003	16	

Singles

Year	Single	Peak positions	Album
Year	Single	SWE	Album
1988	"Sarah"	1	
1991	"Det finns..."	4	
1991	"Ingen vinner"	16	
1991	"Någon som du"	33	
1992	"Till de ensamma"	12	
1992	"Om du var min"	1	
1992	"Nelly"	17	
1994	"Överallt"	26	
1996	"Om det är o.k."	15	
1997	"Långsamt farväl"	56	
1999	"Du är aldrig ensam"	30	
2005	"Kall stjärna"	35	
2010	"Adrenalin"	20	

Mauro & Plura

Year	Album	Peak positions	Certification
Year	Album	SWE	Certification
2014	Mauro & Pluras Tågluff	8	
