= My Versions =

Studio album by Robin Stjernberg
- Released: January 4, 2012
- Length: 33:57
- Label: Lionheart
- Producer: Arnthor Birgisson; Lukasz Duchnowski; Johan Röhr

Robin Stjernberg chronology
My Versions (2012)	Pieces (2013)

Singles from My Versions
- 1. "All This Way" Released: 2011; 2. "Halo" Released: 2012

My Versions is the debut album of Swedish singer Robin Stjernberg. It was released by Lionheart Music Group on January 4, 2012 in Sweden. Recorded after Stjernberg had placed second in Idol 2011, the Swedish Idols franchise, it marked his first solo album after his departure from his former group, the boyband What's Up!. Arnthor Birgisson and Johan Röhr contributed to My Versions.

Stjernberg had pre-released his first music single "All This Way" from the album on December 2, 2011. It was the winning song in the Idol competition, also done by the winner Amanda Fondell in a separate version. A commercial success, My Versions topped the Swedish Albums Chart in the second week of 2012, dated January 13- It stayed at that position for one week.

== Track listing ==
My Versions track listing
No.	Title	Writer(s)	Length
1.	"All This Way"	Arnthor Birgisson; Darin Zanyar	3:19
2.	"Dedication to My Ex"	André Benjamin; Dreshan Smith; Dwayne Carter; Jamal Jones	2:16
3.	"Halo"	Beyoncé; Evan "Kidd" Bogart; Ryan Tedder	4:12
4.	"Let Me Entertain You"	Guy Chambers; Robbie Williams	3:53
5.	"You Raise Me Up"	Rolf Løvland; Brendan Graham	2:42
6.	"In My Head"	Jason Desrouleaux; Claude Kelly; J. R. Rotem	3:01
7.	"Who You Are"	Jessica Cornish; Shelly Peiken; Tobias Gad	3:22
8.	"Breakeven"	Andrew Marcus Frampton; Daniel O'Donoghue; Mark Sheehan; Steve Kipner	4:25
9.	"Love Is Gone"	Chris Willis; David Guetta; Frederic Reisgterer; Joachim Garraud	2:56
10.	"California King Bed"	Andrew Harr; Jermaine Jackson; Priscilla Renea; Alex Delicata; Robyn Fenty	3:48

Notes

- ^{^[a]} signifies additional producer(s)

== Charts ==
=== Weekly charts ===
Weekly chart performance for My Versions
Chart (2012)	Peak position
Swedish Albums (Sverigetopplistan)	1

=== Year-end charts ===
Year-end chart performance for My Versions
Chart (2012)	Position
Swedish Albums (Sverigetopplistan)	92
