= Belong =

Belong may refer to:

== Music ==
- Belong (band), an American experimental music duo

=== Albums ===
- Belong (Kevin Walker album) or the title song, 2013
- Belong (The Pains of Being Pure at Heart album) or the title song, 2011
- Belong, by San Fermin, or the title song, 2017
- Belong, an EP by X Ambassadors, 2020

=== Songs ===
- "Belong" (Axwell and Shapov song), 2016
- "Belong", by Conrad Sewell from Life, 2019
- "Belong", by Dashboard Confessional from Crooked Shadows, 2018
- "Belong", by Editors from Violence, 2018
- "Belong", by Hilary Duff from Breathe In. Breathe Out., 2015
- "Belong", by Joshua Radin, 2015
- "Belong", by R.E.M. from Out of Time, 1991

== Other uses ==
- Belongingness, a human need for membership in a group
- Belong (play), a play by Bola Agbaje
- Belong Ltd, a British care home provider
- Belong, a low-cost internet service provider operated by Telstra

== See also ==
- Belonging (disambiguation)
