= All This Way =

2011 song by Amanda Fondell

Single by Amanda Fondell

from the album All This Way
- Released: 16 December 2011
- Recorded: 2011
- Genre: Pop
- Label: Universal Music
- Songwriters: Arnthor Birgisson; Darin
- Producers: Arnthor Birgisson & Lukipop

"All This Way" is a song performed by Swedish Idol 2011 winner Amanda Fondell and written and produced by Arnthor Birgisson and Idol 2004 runner-up Darin Zanyar. "All This Way" was the winners song of Idol 2011 which meant both Amanda Fondell, Robin Stjernberg and Moa Lignell all recorded a version of the song. The song reached the top of the Swedish Singles Chart. It is also the title track of Fondell's debut album All This Way that reached No. 1 on the Swedish Albums Chart.

== Track listing ==
Digital download
No.	Title	Length
1.	"All This Way"	3:18

== Chart performance ==
=== Weekly charts ===
Chart (2011)	Peak position	Certification
Sweden (Sverigetopplistan)	1	GLF: 3× Platinum

=== Year-end charts ===
Chart (2012)	Position
Swedish Singles (Sverigetopplistan)	80

== Release history ==
Region	Date	Format	Label
Sweden	5 December 2011	Digital Download	Universal Music
Sweden	16 December 2011	Release	Universal Music

== Other versions ==
"All This Way"

Single by Robin Stjernberg

from the album My Versions
- Released: 16 December 2011
- Recorded: 2011
- Genre: Pop
- Songwriters: Arnthor Birgisson, Darin

Robin Stjernberg who was runner-up to Amanda Fondell, as well as Moa Lignell who came third, recorded the song prior to the Final 3 live show. Stjernberg's version proved popular after downloads were made available for the versions by Fondell and Stjernberg. Lignell's version was uploaded on YouTube but was eventually deleted due to copyright issues.

Robin Stjernberg also included it in his debut album My Versions that topped the Swedish Albums Chart in week 2/2012 (dated 13 January 2012).
