= When I Held Ya =

Single by Moa Lignell
- Released: 20 January 2012
- Recorded: 2011–12
- Genre: Pop
- Length: 3:29
- Label: Universal Music
- Songwriter(s): Moa Lignell

"When I Held Ya" is a song performed by singer Moa Lignell, who finished third on Swedish Idol 2011. The song was released on 20 January 2012 as a Digital download on iTunes in Sweden. The song has peaked at number four on the Swedish Singles Chart.

== Track listing ==
Digital download
No.	Title	Length
1.	"When I Held Ya"	3:29
2.	"When I Held Ya" (Instrumental Version)	3:29

== Charts ==
Chart (2012)	Peak position
Sweden (Sverigetopplistan)	4

== Release history ==
Region	Date	Format	Label
Sweden	20 January 2012	Digital Download	Universal Music
