= Kevin Walker (Swedish footballer) =

Swedish footballer & singer (born 1989)

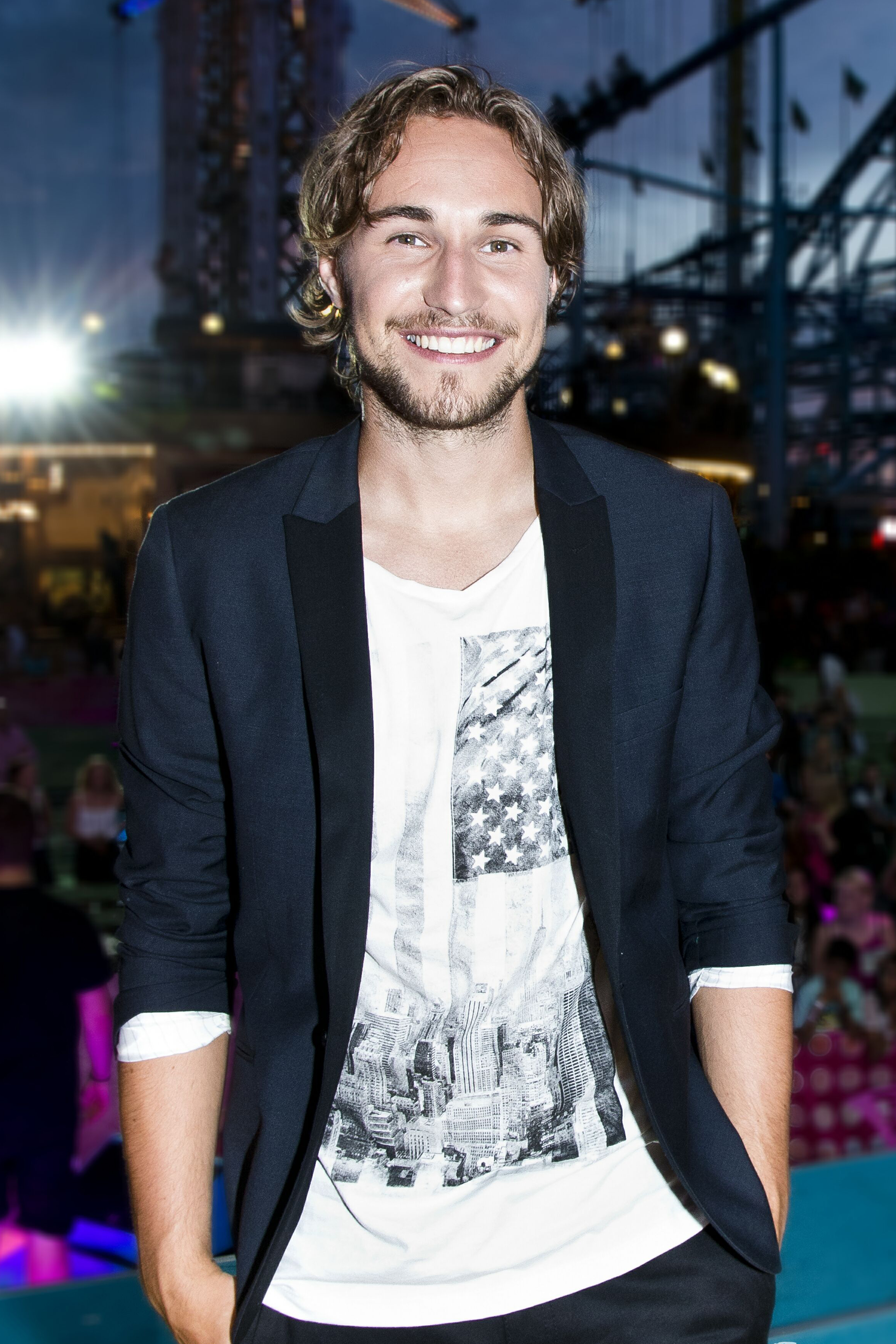
- Walker at Gröna Lund during Sommarkrysset in 2014
- Born: 3 August 1989 (age 37); Örebro, Sweden
- Height: 1.75 m (5 ft 9 in)
Association football career
- Position: Centre midfielder
Youth career
- 1994: Varbergs BoIS
- 1994–1998: Kalmar FF
- 1998–2000: ÖSK Ungdom
- 2001–2004: GIF Sundsvall
- 2005: Örebro SK
Senior career*
Years	Team	Apps	(Gls)
2006–2007	Örebro SK	6	(0)
2007–2011	AIK	26	(1)
2008	→ Väsby United	3	(0)
2010	→ Väsby United	8	(2)
2010	→ Assyriska (loan)	7	(0)
2011	→ GIF Sundsvall (loan)	8	(3)
2012–2014	GIF Sundsvall	81	(11)
2015–2020	Djurgårdens IF	132	(14)
2021–2023	Örebro SK	60	(4)
International career
2006	Sweden U17	8	(3)
2008	Sweden U19	2	(0)
- * Club domestic league appearances and goals as of 17 November 2023
Musical career
- Genre: Pop
- Occupations: Singer, musician
- Instruments: Vocals, guitar
- Years active: 2013–present
- Label: Universal Music Sweden (2013–present)

Kevin Walker (born 3 August 1989) is a Swedish singer and former footballer. He is a centre midfielder. Walker was the winner of the 9th series of the Swedish version of Idol in 2013.

== Football career ==
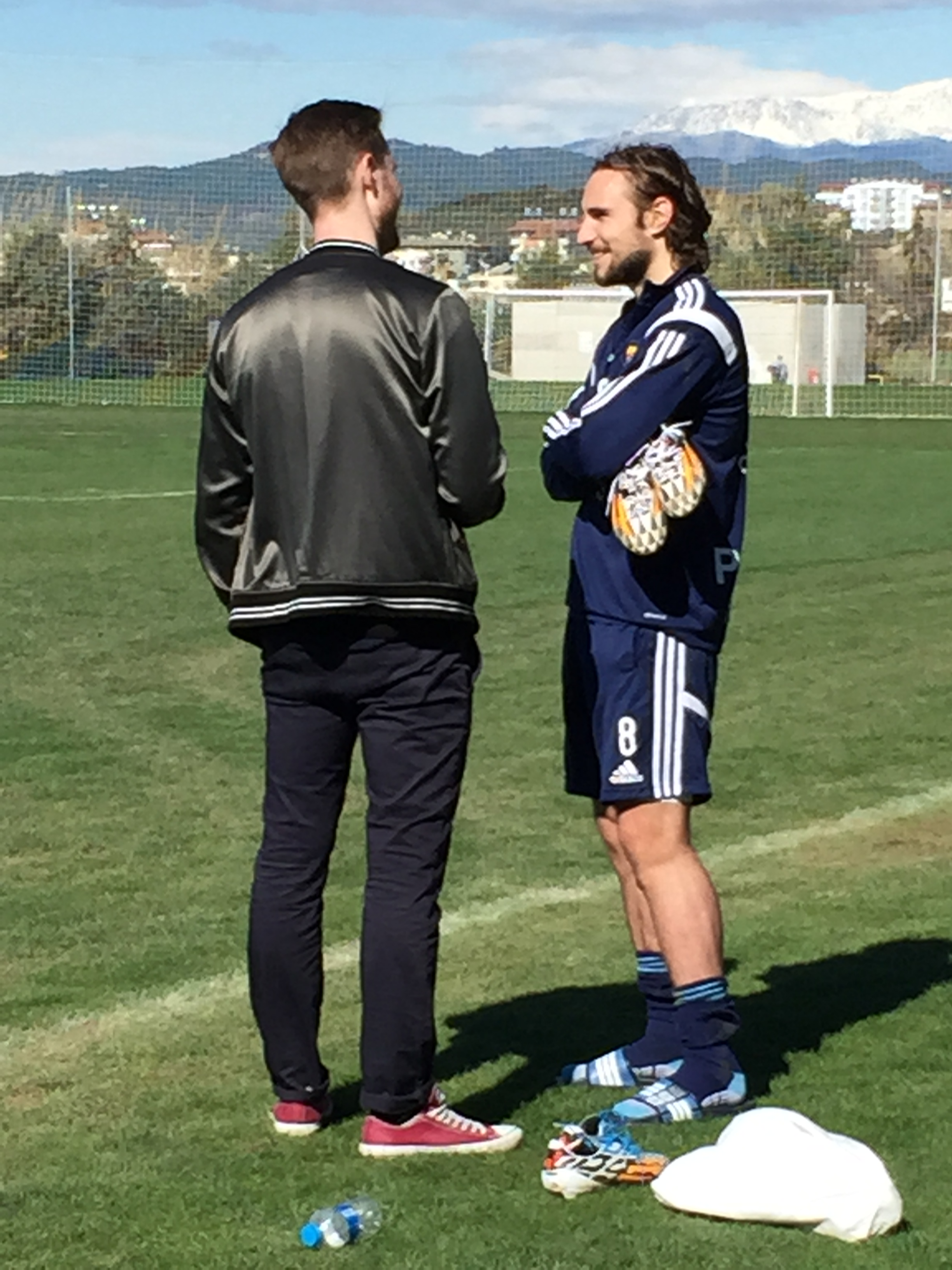
Walker training with Djurgårdens IF, 2015

=== Club ===
Walker was born in Örebro, Sweden, and started his football career in Varbergs BoIS. Son of the former Örebro SK manager Patrick Walker, Kevin made his senior debut for Superettan team Örebro SK in the 2006 season. Örebro SK was promoted to Allsvenskan and Walker made his Allsvenskan debut in the following season.

From 2007 to 2011, Walker was in the AIK organisation, having loan spells to Väsby United, Assyriska Föreningen and GIF Sundsvall. He moved to GIF Sundsvall at the end of the 2011 season.

Walker played for Superettan side GIF Sundsvall which he vice-captained during the autumn 2013. After the 2014 season, Walker signed a contract with Djurgårdens IF and was presented on 5 November 2014. In March 2016 Walker was appointed captain for Djurgårdens IF. On 10 May 2018 he played as Djurgarden beat Malmö FF 3–0 in the Swedish Cup Final.

On 30 December 2020, Örebro SK announced that they had signed Walker to a three-year deal.

=== International ===
Walker made eight Sweden men's national under-17 football team appearances in 2006 and scored three goals. He made two Sweden men's national under-19 football team appearances in 2008.

Walker and his brother Robert are also eligible to represent the Republic of Ireland.

=== Honours ===
==== Club ====
AIK

- Allsvenskan: 2009
- Svenska Cupen: 2009
- Supercupen: 2010

Djurgårdens IF

- Allsvenskan: 2019
- Svenska Cupen: 2017–18

== Musical career ==
Walker has been fascinated with music from a very young age; ever since he heard his Irish grandfather sing.

=== In Idol ===
In 2013, he auditioned to the Swedish Idol 2013 with the song "Soldier". The series in its ninth season was broadcast on TV4. His whole Idol adventure began after a video of him jamming with a teammate at a football club function caught the attention of the show's producers. A few of Walker's football league games for GIF Sundsvall were moved to avoid a clash with his television commitments during Idol.

Walker reached the final alongside Elin Bergman, with both of them singing the winning song "Belong". Walker won by popular vote. His winning prize included a recording contract with Universal Music Sweden. In the final show, he and Bergman joined Robbie Williams in singing Williams' song, "Shine My Shoes".

Performances

- Audition: – "Soldier" (Gavin DeGraw)
- Bootcamp heats: – "Use Somebody" (Kings of Leon)
- Week 1 (Theme "Here I am") – "Pride" (U2)
- Week 2 (Theme: "My Idol") – "Say" (John Mayer)
- Week 3 (Theme "Swedish music exports") – "Poker Face" (Lady Gaga)
- Week 4 (Theme: "Gone too soon") – "Behind Blue Eyes" (The Who)
- Week 5 (Theme: "Successful Idol singers") – "Hope and Glory" – (Måns Zelmerlöw)
- Week 6 (Theme: "Big Band Friday") – "It's My Life" (Jon Bon Jovi)
- Week 7 (Theme: "Hits in Swedish") – "Till dom ensamma" (Mauro Scocco) and "Välkommen in" (Veronica Maggio)
- Week 8 (Theme: "Unplugged") – "Don't Look Back in Anger" (Oasis) and "Hall of Fame" (The Script)
- Week 9 – Final 4
  - round 1 – (Theme: "Self written") – "Dreaming" (Peter Boström, Thomas G:son and Kevin Walker)
  - round 2 – (Theme: "Picked by jury") – "Free Fallin'" (Tom Petty)
- Week 10 – Semi-finals – Final 3
  - round 1 – (Theme: "Audition song") – "Soldier" (Gavin DeGraw)
  - round 2 – (Theme: "Chart topping") – "Home" (Daughtry)
- Week 11 – Final (Top 2)
  - round 1 – (Theme: "Own choice") – "Where the Streets Have No Name" (U2)
  - round 2 – (Theme: "Viewers' choice") – "Say" (John Mayer)
  - round 3 – (Theme: "Winner's song") – "Belong" (Kevin Walker)

=== After Idol ===
After winning the title, he was signed to Universal Music as part of the award, and released his debut single, the winning song "Belong" that subsequently charted on Sverigetopplistan, the official Swedish Singles Chart. Walker's debut studio album, also titled Belong, peaked at number 2 on the Swedish Album chart.

In late December 2013, Walker was interviewed in the talk show The Late Late Show on RTÉ while visiting Ireland. He performed "Where the Streets Have No Name" during the show.

== Discography ==
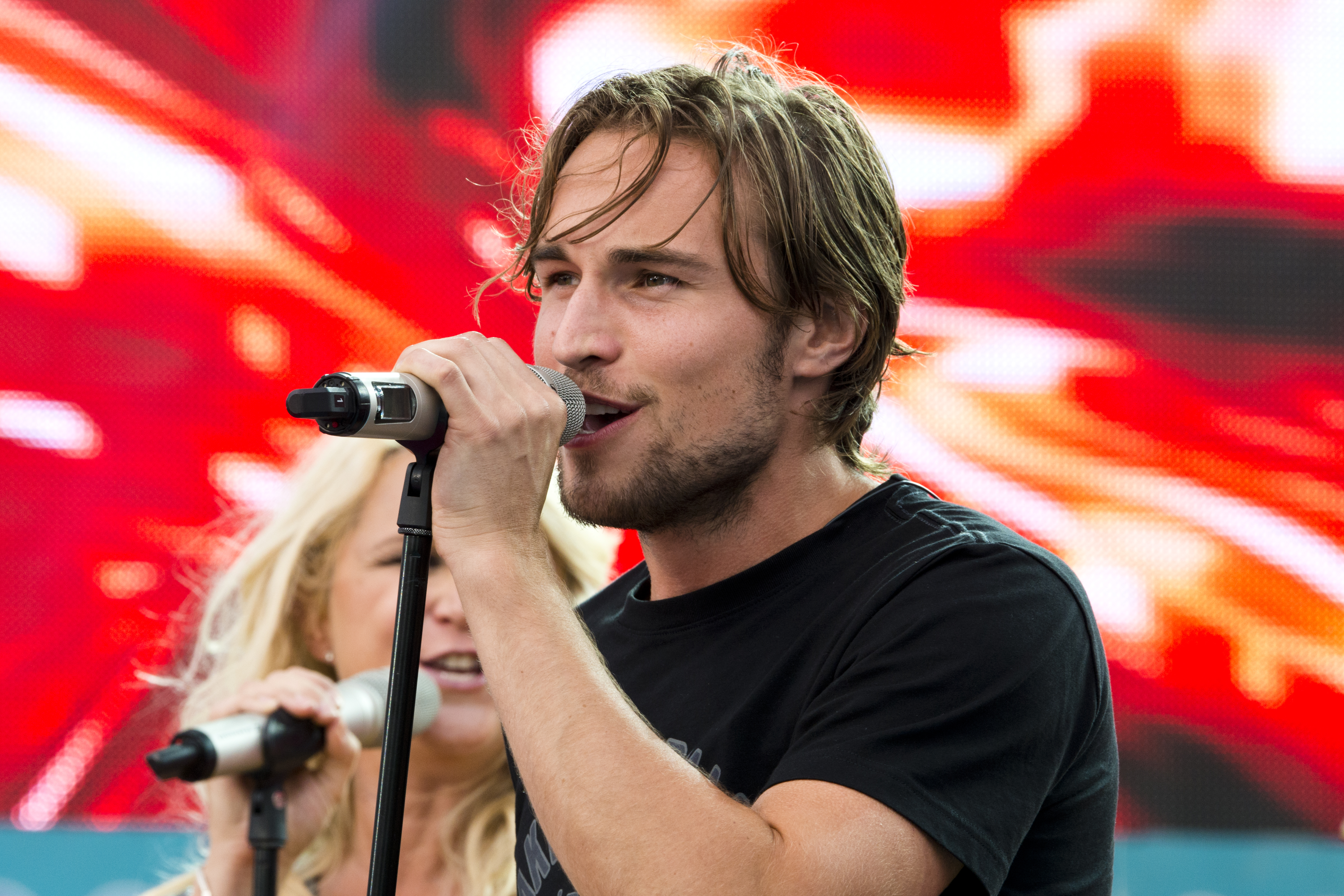
Walker singing

=== Album ===
Year	Album	Peak positions
Year	Album	SWE
2013	Belong	2

=== Singles ===
Year	Single	Peak positions	Certifications	Album
Year	Single	SWE	Certifications	Album
2013	"Belong"	8	GLF: Platinum	Belong
2020	"Humble By Life"	—	—	Non-album single

Preceded by Amanda Fondell	Idol winner Kevin Walker (2013)	Succeeded by Lisa Ajax
