= Belonging =

Belonging may refer to:

- Belongingness, the need to belong
- Belonging (TV series), a Welsh television drama series
- "Belonging" (Angel), a 2001 episode of the television series Angel
- "Belonging" (Dollhouse), a 2009 episode of the television series Dollhouse
- Belonging (Keith Jarrett album), 1974
- Belonging (Branford Marsalis Quartet album), 2025
- Belonging (1922 film), a British silent crime film
- Belonging (2004 film), a British TV film

== See also ==
- Belong (disambiguation)
