= Pieces (Robin Stjernberg album) =

Studio album by Robin Stjernberg
- Released: 26 June 2013
- Length: 38:39
- Label: Lionheart
- Producer: Amir Aly; Joy Deb; Linnea Deb; Henrik Wikström

Robin Stjernberg chronology
My Versions (2012)	Pieces (2013)

On My Mind is the second studio album by Swedish singer Robin Stjernberg. It was released by Lionheart Music Group on 26 June 2013.

== Track listing ==
Pieces track listing
No.	Title	Writer(s)	Producer(s)	Length
1.	"One Down Two to Go"	Robin Stjernberg; Johan Åsgärde; Mattias Frändå; Oliver Lundström	Amir Aly	2:50
2.	"Pieces"	Stjernberg; Åsgärde; Frändå; Lundström	Aly	2:58
3.	"Crime"	Stjernberg; Åsgärde; Frändå; Lundström	Aly	2:58
4.	"You"	Stjernberg; Linnea Deb; Joy Deb; Joakim Harestad Haukaas	J. Deb	3:03
5.	"Isn't It Time"	Stjernberg; Åsgärde; Frändå; Lundström	Aly	3:03
6.	"Rule the World"	Stjernberg; Åsgärde; Frändå; Lundström	Aly	3:10
7.	"For the Better"	Stjernberg; Chris Snyder; Sara Biglert	Aly	3:16
8.	"Scars"	Stjernberg; L. Deb; J. Deb; David Jackson	L. Deb; J. Deb	3:01
9.	"Beautiful"	Stjernberg; Amir Aly; Henrik Wikström; Sharon Vaughn	Aly; Wikström	3:05
10.	"Six Feet Down"	Stjernberg; Åsgärde; Frändå; Lundström		3:55
11.	"On My Mind"	Stjernberg; Oscar Holter; Jakob Erixson	Aly	3:35
12.	"Every Bit of Me"	Stjernberg; L. Deb; J. Deb; Joel Strömgren	Aly	3:46

Notes

- ^{^[a]} signifies an additional producer(s)

== Charts ==
=== Weekly charts ===
Weekly chart performance for Pieces
Chart (2013)	Peak position
Swedish Albums (Sverigetopplistan)	2

=== Year-end charts ===
Year-end chart performance for Pieces
Chart (2013)	Position
Swedish Albums (Sverigetopplistan)	45

== Certifications ==
Certifications for Pieces
Region	Certification	Certified units/sales
Sweden (GLF)	Gold	20,000^{‡}
^{‡} Sales+streaming figures based on certification alone.
