= All This Way (album) =

Studio album by Amanda Fondell
- Released: 19 December 2011
- Recorded: 2011
- Genre: Pop
- Label: Universal Music

Singles from All This Way
- 1. "All This Way" Released: 5 December 2011

All This Way is the first studio album by Swedish singer and winner of eight series of Swedish Idol Amanda Fondell. The album features the single "All This Way". It was released in Sweden on 19 December 2011. The album entered the Swedish Albums Chart at number #6 and reached #1 its second week.

== Singles ==
- "All This Way" was released as the album's lead single on 5 December 2011. The song peaked to number 1 on the Swedish Singles Chart.

== Track listing ==
| No. | Title | Length |
|---|---|---|
| 1. | "All This Way" | 3:18 |
| 2. | "My Man" | 3:22 |
| 3. | "It's Oh So Quiet" | 3:39 |
| 4. | "Please Mr. Postman" | 2:30 |
| 5. | "True Colors" | 2:19 |
| 6. | "(I Can't Get No) Satisfaction" | 3:20 |
| 7. | "Song 2" | 2:04 |
| 8. | "I Got a Woman" | 2:55 |
| 9. | "Hey Ya!" | 2:48 |
| 10. | "Made Of" | 3:03 |

== Charts ==
=== Weekly charts ===
| Chart (2011) | Peak position |
|---|---|
| Swedish Albums (Sverigetopplistan) | 1 |

=== Year-end charts ===
| Chart (2011) | Position |
|---|---|
| Swedish Albums (Sverigetopplistan) | 43 |
| Chart (2012) | Position |
| Swedish Albums (Sverigetopplistan) | 79 |

== Release history ==
| Region | Date | Format |
|---|---|---|
| Sweden | 19 December 2011 | Digital download |
