= You (Robin Stjernberg song) =

2013 single by Robin Stjernberg

Single by Robin Stjernberg

from the album Pieces
- Released: 24 February 2013
- Recorded: 2013
- Genre: Pop
- Length: 3:04
- Label: Lionheart Music Group
- Songwriters: Robin Stjernberg, Linnea Deb, Joy Deb, Joakim Harestad Haukaas

Robin Stjernberg singles chronology
"Scars" (2012)	"You" (2013)	"Crime" (2013)

Eurovision Song Contest 2013 entry
- Country: Sweden
- Artist: Robin Stjernberg
- Language: English
- Composers: Joakim Harestad Haukaas; Robin Stjernberg; Linnea Deb; Joy Deb
- Lyricists: Joakim Harestad Haukaas; Robin Stjernberg; Linnea Deb; Joy Deb

Finals performance
- Final result: 14th
- Final points: 62

Entry chronology
- ◄ "Euphoria" (2012)
- "Undo" (2014) ►

"You" is a pop song released in 2013 by the Swedish singer Robin Stjernberg. The song won Melodifestivalen 2013 on 9 March that year, and represented Sweden in the Eurovision Song Contest 2013 in Malmö, Sweden, placing 14th in a field of 26 in the Finals held on 18 May 2013. Had only the jury votes been counted in the Eurovision final, Stjernberg would have been placed third. The boost from the international juries used in Melodifestivalen also made "You" the only song from the Second Chance round to win.

== Melodifestivalen and Eurovision ==
"You" participated in the fourth heat of the 2013 Melodifestivalen, which was held on 23 February 2013 at the Malmö Arena in Malmö. The song was the third of the eight competing entries to perform, and initially progressed to the Second Chance round, having failed to receive enough telephone votes to progress directly to the contest final as one of the top two songs, but having finished in the third or fourth position. In the Second Chance round, held on 2 March 2013 at the Löfbergs Lila Arena in Karlstad, two additional rounds selected two additional qualifiers for the final: in the first round Stjernberg was the first of the eight competing entries to perform, "You" emerged among the four most voted for songs which progressed to the second round where each song competed in duels to determine one qualifier from each duel. In the second duel, "You" competed against "In and Out of Love" performed by Martin Rolinski, and Stjernberg was announced to have received more votes than Rolinski and thus progressed to the final. On 9 March, during the final held at the Friends Arena in Solna, Stjernberg was the ninth of the ten competing acts to perform, and "You" won the contest with 166 votes, receiving the highest number of votes from the international juries and the second highest number of public votes.

By virtue of winning the previous year's contest and being the host country, Sweden automatically qualified to the final of the 2013 Eurovision Song Contest in Malmö on 18 May. "You" was performed in the sixteenth position of the 26 competing entries, and Stjernberg subsequently finished in fourteenth place, receiving 62 points in total, including the maximum 12 points from Norway.

== Track listing ==
Digital download

1. "You" - 3:04

== Charts ==
=== Weekly charts ===
Chart (2013)	Peak position
Austria (Ö3 Austria Top 40)	61
Belgium (Ultratip Bubbling Under Flanders)	78
Denmark (Chartbase Top 100)	25
Germany (GfK)	58
Iceland (RÚV)	12
Ireland (IRMA)	31
Finland Download (Latauslista)	25
Netherlands (Single Top 100)	42
Sweden (Sverigetopplistan)	1
UK Singles (Official Charts Company)	72
UK Indie (Official Charts)	11

=== Year-end charts ===
Chart (2013)	Position
Sweden (Sverigetopplistan)	9

== Certifications ==
Region	Certification	Certified units/sales
Norway (IFPI Norway)	Platinum	10,000^{*}
Sweden (GLF)	3× Platinum	120,000^{‡}
^{*} Sales figures based on certification alone.^{‡} Sales+streaming figures based on certification alone.

== Release history ==
Region	Date	Format	Label
Sweden	24 February 2013	Digital download	Lionheart Music Group
United Kingdom	24 February 2013	Digital download	Lionheart Music Group
