= Robin Stjernberg =

Swedish singer-songwriter (born 1991)

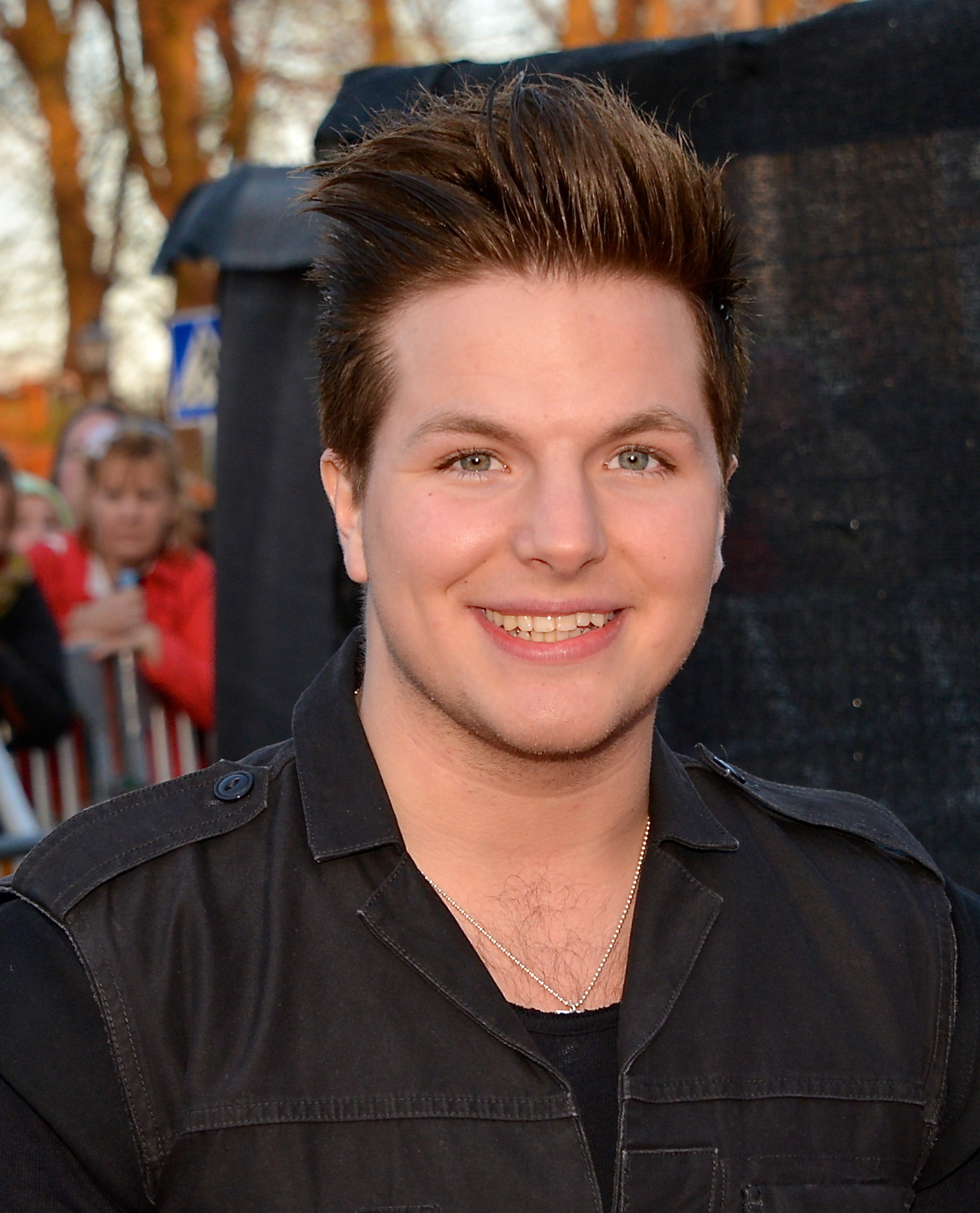
- Robin Stjernberg in May 2013.

Background information
- Born: Robin James Olof Stjernberg; 22 February 1991 (age 35); Hässleholm, Sweden
- Genre: Pop
- Occupation: Singer
- Instrument: Vocals
- Years active: 2006 – present
- Labels: Freebird Entertainment; Lionheart Music Group; Universal Music
- Formerly of: What's Up!
- Website: https://robinstjernberg.com/

Robin James Olof Stjernberg (Swedish pronunciation: [ˈrɔ̌bːɪn ˈɧæ̂ːɳbærj]; born 22 February 1991) is a Swedish pop singer, songwriter and producer. He represented Sweden in the Eurovision Song Contest 2013 on home soil on 18 May 2013 with the song "You". Stjernberg started his career in the boyband What's Up!, and became a contestant in Idol 2011, placing as first runner up in the final. He participated in Eurovision Song Contest 2017 as the songwriter for the song "I Can't Go On" performed by Robin Bengtsson, which ended up in fifth place.

== Career ==
=== In band What's Up! ===
Stjernberg had won in the Sommarchansen in Malmö in 2006. In 2007, he took part in an event held at the Globe Theater where 15 finalists vied to become part of a prospective boy band. He was one of four chosen to become part of the band, eventually called What's Up!. The other finalists that made part of the band were Eric Saade, Ludwig "Ludde" Keijser and Johan Yngvesson. When Eric Saade left, he was replaced by Johannes Magnusson. The band released one album, In Pose reaching number 40 on the Swedish Albums Chart. Two of the singles charted in the Sverigetopplistan, the official Swedish Singles Chart, namely "Go Girl!" reaching number 5 and "If I Told You Once" that peaked at number 16. Stjernberg became the second member of What's Up! to represent Sweden at Eurovision after Eric Saade represented the country in the Eurovision Song Contest 2011 in Germany.

=== In Idol (2011) ===
Stjernberg took part in Idol 2011 and finished in second place.

Performances

- Audition: "Who You Are" from Jessie J
- 26 September 2011 (Quarter-final): "Breakeven" from (The Script)
- 30 September 2011 (Semi-final): "Animal" from (Neon Trees) (To Final 12)
- 7 October 2011 (Top 11): "California King Bed" from Rihanna (safe)
- 14 October 2011 (Top 10): "Alla Vill Till Himmelen Men Ingen Vill Dö" from Timbuktu (safe)
- 21 October 2011 (Top 9): "Halo" from (Beyoncé) (safe)
- 28 October 2011 (Top 8): "When a Man Loves a Woman" from Percy Sledge (safe)
- 4 November 2011 (Top 7): "Who You Are" from Jessie J (safe)
- 11 November 2011 (Top 6): "Reach Out, I'll Be There" from The Four Tops (safe)
- 18 November 2011 (Top 5): "Bohemian Rhapsody" from Queen and "Pride (In the Name of Love)" from U2 (safe)
- 25 November 2011 (Top 4): "Let Me Entertain You" from Robbie Williams and You Raise Me Up from Josh Groban (safe)
- 2 December 2011 (Top 3): "Dedication to My Ex (Miss That)" from Lloyd and "Love Is Gone" from David Guetta & Chris Willis (safe)
- 9 December 2011 (Final): "In My Head" from Jason Derulo, "Halo" from Beyoncé Knowles and the winner's song "All This Way"

He received 48% of the votes against 52% to the winner Amanda Fondell in the final.

=== After Idol ===
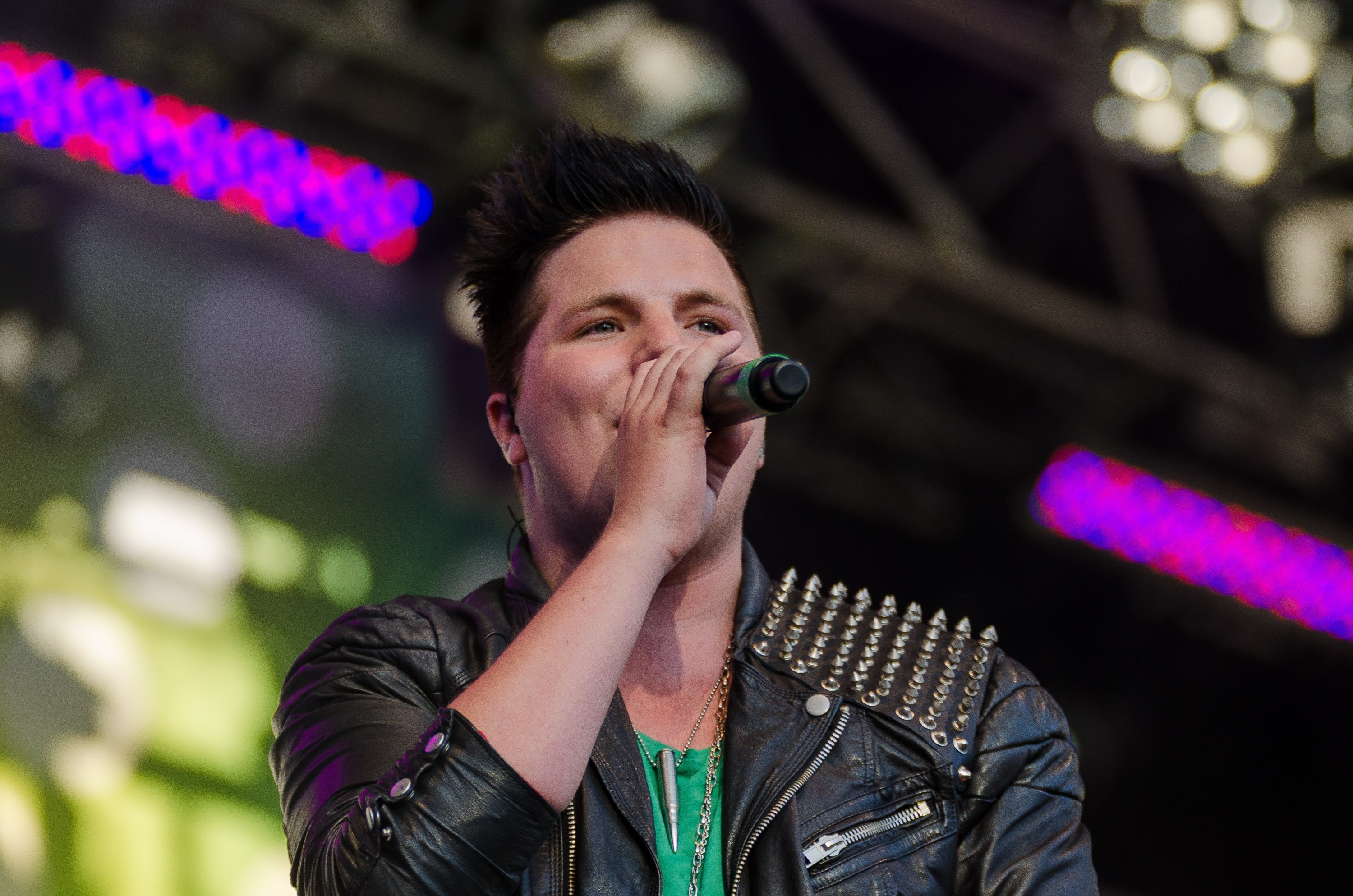
Robin Stjernberg 2012.

After Idol, he released his first music single "All This Way" on 2 December 2011. The song, also sung by the winner Amanda Fondell in a separate version, is written and produced by Idol 2004 first runner up Darin Zanyar amongst others. Stjernberg is signed to the Lionheart Music Group record label.

He released his own Idol-compilation My Versions on 4 January 2012. The first official single from the album will be his version of Beyoncé's song "Halo".

=== Melodifestivalen and Eurovision 2013 ===
Stjernberg took part in Melodifestivalen 2013 with the song "You". He performed in the fourth semi-final held on 23 February 2013 in Malmö Arena, Malmö and coming 3rd/4th, qualified to the "Second Chance" round, which was held on 2 March in Löfbergs Lila Arena, Karlstad. In the "Second Chance" round, he was in the best four songs after the first two rounds of voting, and he won his duel against Martin Rolinski. He went on to win the final on 9 March. He represented Sweden in the Eurovision Song Contest 2013 in Malmö on 18 May, placing 14th with 62 points. Robin Stjernberg's song became the first "Second Chance" song ever to win the Melodifestivalen final.

=== After Eurovision ===
Robin went on to release his debut non-cover album 'Pieces' on 26 June 2013, which included 'You' and other singles; 'Scars' & 'Crime'.

On 11 June 2014, Robin released his single named Body language. This single reached no1 in the Swedish iTunes chart.

On 23 October 2015, Robin also released a single "Locked into You" after over a year of silence for Robin. His last release was 'Take Me Home' which was released on 7 January 2016, which peaked at number 5 in the Swedish iTunes chart.

He co-wrote Robin Bengtsson's song for Melodifestivalen 2017, "I Can't Go On". The song went on to win, meaning Stjernberg participated in the Eurovision Song Contest 2017 as a songwriter, ending up in fifth place.

In 2020, Robin became one half of OhFrank and released several singles. On the first of 2021 Robin released his comeback single Pretty.

=== Songwriter and producer ===
Robin Stjernberg competed as a songwriter and producer in the Eurovision Song Contest 2017 for the Swedish entry "I Can't Go On", which was performed by Robin Bengtsson and landed in fifth place in the final. Since then, Robin has written and produced a number of songs for both other artists as well as himself, and also collaborated with award-winning songwriters such as Liz Rose, Matt McGinn, Gordie Sampson and Burt Butler. In 2019 and 2020, Robin spent a lot of time in both Stockholm and Nashville, aiming to develop his own artistry. Robin has written and produced music for artists such as Sandro Cavazza, Dotter, Estraden, Megan Thee Stallion, Anna Bergendahl, Jill Johnson and Steps. Robin also took part in writing The Mamas's entry in Melodifestivalen 2021, "In The Middle", which placed third in the final. In 2020 he took part in writing the hit song Lean on Me, which placed #1 on Swedish charts and airplay.

=== ohFrank ===
Robin Stjernberg and Benjamin Roustaing started their group project ohFrank during 2020. Together they have released the EP "Dandelion" and the singles "Millenial", "Schizophrenic" and "Venice", to mention a few.

== Discography ==
=== Studio albums ===
Title	Details	Peak chart positions	Certification
Title	Details	SWE	Certification
My Versions	Released: 4 January 2012; Label: Lionheart Music Group; Format: CD, digital download	1	—
Pieces	Released: 26 June 2013; Label: Lionheart Music Group; Format: CD, digital download	2	GLF: Gold

=== Extended plays ===
Title	Details
For the Better	Released: 24 April 2013; Label: Lionheart Music Group; Format: Digital download
Under Water	Released: 5 October 2018; Label: Lionheart Music Group; Format: Digital download

=== Singles ===
==== As lead artist ====
Title	Year	Peak chart positions						Certifications	Album
Title	Year	SWE	AUT	GER	IRE	NL	UK	Certifications	Album
"All This Way"	2011	—	—	—	—	—	—		My Versions
"Halo"	2012	—	—	—	—	—	—		My Versions
"On My Mind"	2012	—	—	—	—	—	—		Pieces
"Scars"	2012	—	—	—	—	—			Pieces
"You"	2013	1	61	58	31	42	72	GLF: 3× Platinum	Pieces
"Crime"	2013	—	—	—	—	—	—		Pieces
"Body Language"	2014	—	—	—	—	—	—		Pieces
"Locked into You"	2015	—	—	—	—	—	—		Non-album singles
"Take Me Home"	2016	—	—	—	—	—	—		Non-album singles
"Rain"	2016	—	—	—	—	—	—		Non-album singles
"Feed on My Love"	2017	—	—	—	—	—	—		Non-album singles
"Love"	2018	—	—	—	—	—	—		Non-album singles
"I Don't"	2018	—	—	—	—	—	—		Under Water
"Always"	2019	—	—	—	—	—	—		Under Water
"It's Hard To Get Hurt (When You Got Nobody)"	2019	—	—	—	—	—	—		Under Water
"Pretty"	2021	—	—	—	—	—	—		Non-album single
"—" denotes single that did not chart or was not released.

==== As featured artist ====
Title	Year	Album
"Sista ordet" (Niello featuring Robin Stjernberg)	2017	Non-album single
"Miles of Blue" (Jill Johnson featuring Robin Stjernberg)	2020	Non-album single
"Less Alone" (Anna Bergendahl featuring Robin Stjernberg)	2020	EP

=== Songwriting and Production Credits ===
- 2017 - "I Can't Go On" (Robin Bengtsson)
- 2017 - "Sista ordet" (Niello feat. Robin Stjernberg)
- 2018 - "Dansa" (Niello)
- 2018 - "I Wouln't Lie" (Steerner)
- 2019 - "The One Thing" (Isa Molin)
- 2019 - "Vi var som inga andra" (Oscar Enestad)
- 2019 - "Sign Of My Love" (Oscar Enestad)
- 2019 - "Om om och om igen" (Omar Rudberg)
- 2019 - "Old Days" (Benjamin Roustaing)
- 2019 - "My Remedy" (Jill Johnson)
- 2019 - "I Don't Wanna Talk It Over" (Jill Johnson)
- 2019 - "Scared Holding On To You" (Isa Molin)
- 2019 - "Torn" (Lisa Ajax)
- 2019 - "Is It Hard Being A Man" (Jill Johnson)
- 2020 - "Livet börjar nu" (Albin Johnsén)
- 2020 - "Made Of You" (Anna Bergendahl)
- 2020 - "Less Alone" (Anna Bergendahl)
- 2020 - "Somebody to Lean On" (Isa Molin)
- 2020 - "Aldrig mer vara du" (Estraden)
- 2020 - "Crying in The Car" (Megan Thee Stallion)
- 2020 - "Hold My Heart" (Steps)
- 2020 - "Touch The Sky" (The Mamas)
- 2020 - "Miles of Blue" (Jill Johnson feat. Robin Stjernberg)
- 2020 - "When I Get Older" (Jill Johnson)
- 2020 - "So Much for Love" (Andrelli)
- 2020 - "Best Is Yet To Come" (Sandro Cavazza)
- 2020 - "Shades In The Rain" (Sandro Cavazza)
- 2020 - "Lean On Me" (Sandro Cavazza)
- 2020 - "A Christmas Night To Remember" (The Mamas)
- 2020 - "Shine A Light" (The Mamas)
- 2021 - "New Year" (Dotter)
- 2021 - "In The Middle" (The Mamas)
- 2021 - "Friend of a Friend" (Nause)
- 2021 - "Young Right Now" (Robin Schulz, Dennis Lloyd)
- 2022 – "This One's on Me" (Emma Steinbakken)
- 2022 – "Get on My Love" (Picture This)
- 2022 – "Lonely Together" (Kygo featuring Dagny)
- 2022 – "Ordinary Life" (Imanbek, Wiz Khalifa, KDDK and Kiddo)
- 2022 – "Nakna" (Omar Rudberg and Victoria Nadine)
- 2022 – "The Days" (Sandro Cavazza)
- 2022 – "Mama" (Omar Rudberg)
- 2022 – "Lovesick" (Alan Walker and Sophie Simmons)
- 2023 – "Parents" (Emma Steinbakken)
- 2023 – "All for Love" (Felix Jaehn featuring Sandro Cavazza)
- 2023 – "Better Now" (Matteo Bocelli)
- 2023 – "Good Time" (Sheppard)
- 2023 – "Andas in andas ut" (Thomas Stenström)
- 2023 – "When You're Young" (Clara Mae)
- 2023 – "She Fell in Love in the Summer" (Omar Rudberg)
- 2023 – "Om du inte fanns (Don't Wait)" (Omar Rudberg)
- 2023 – "Min första (I Will Always Be Your Soldier)" (Omar Rudberg)
- 2024 – "Surrender" (Kygo and Fred Well)
- 2024 – "Someone to Be Mine" (Boris Way)
- 2024 – "Call It Love" (Picture This)
- 2024 – "Satellites" (Picture This)
- 2024 – "Sunshine" (Sheppard and Jolyon Petch)
- 2025 – "Let's Try Love" (Picture This)
- 2025 – "Helvete!" (Thomas Stenström)
- 2025 – "Oh Uddevalla" (Thomas Stenström)
- 2025 – "Vill du ha mig?" (Thomas Stenström)
- 2025 – "Dance with Me" (Tom Gregory)
- 2025 – "Home" (Zak Abel)
- 2025 – "Palaces (demo)" (Michael Aldag)
- 2026 – "Heaven on Your Mind" (Kygo featuring Dan Tyminski)

Preceded by Loreen	Melodifestivalen winner 2013	Succeeded by Sanna Nielsen
