= Linderöd Church =

- Linderöds kyrka
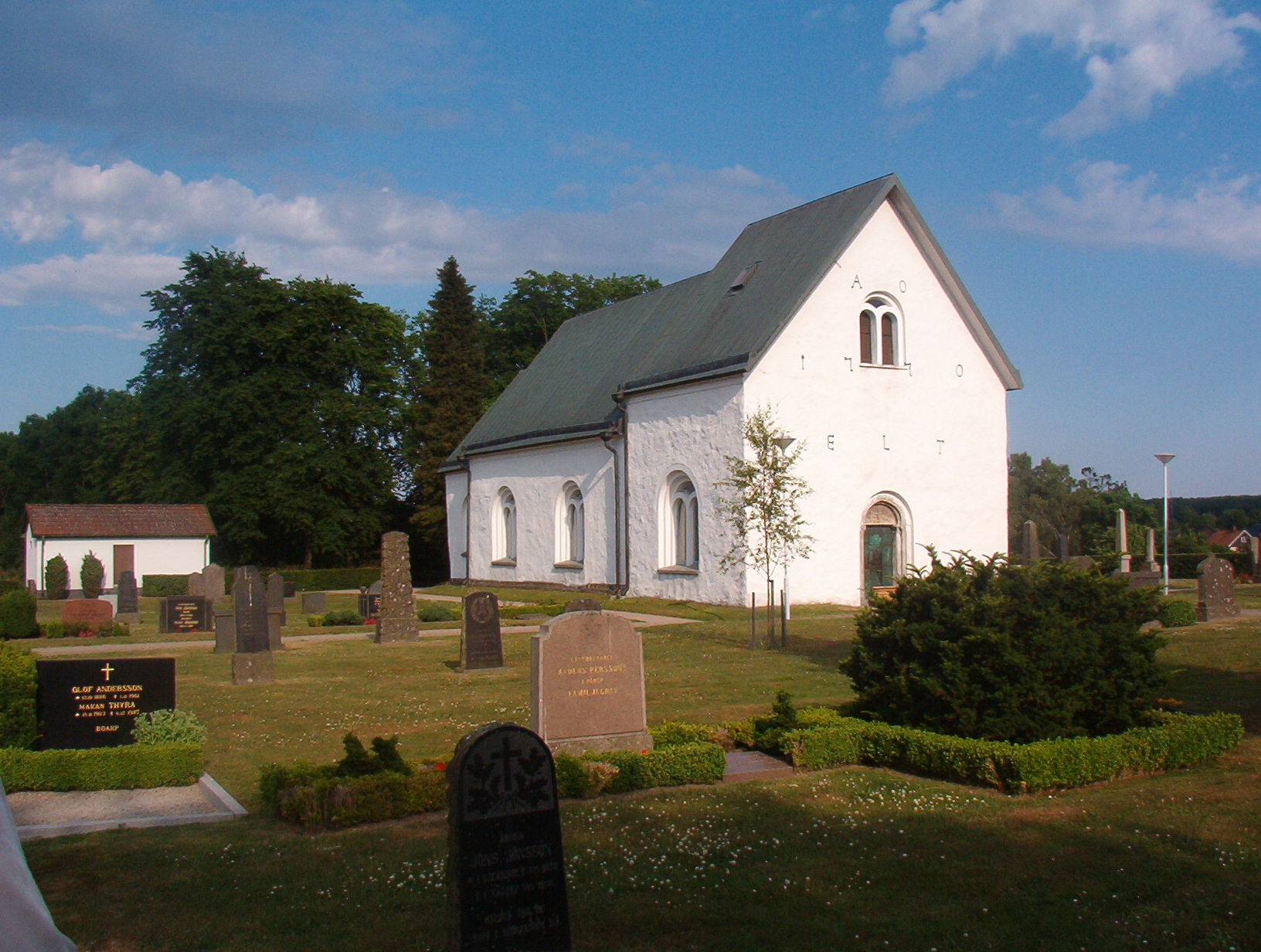
- Linderöd Church

- 55°56′15″N 13°49′24″E
- Country: Sweden
- Denomination: Church of Sweden

Linderöd Church (Swedish: Linderöds kyrka) is a medieval church in Linderöd, in the province of Skåne, Sweden.

== History ==
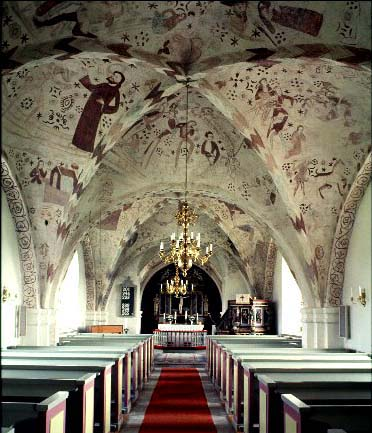
Interior view towards the choir with murals visible

Linderöd Church was built during the middle of the 12th century. The vaults of the church are Gothic and date from the 15th century. During the Late Middle Ages a church porch was also built in front of the southern entrance, but it was later demolished. In 1770 the church was enlarged towards the west. At this time there were plans to build a church tower, but they were never realized. Helgo Zettervall led a rebuilding of the church in 1873, adding modern windows while demolishing the church porch and moving the Romanesque southern portal to the western gable.

== Murals ==
In 1929, medieval murals were discovered under later layers of whitewash, and in 1950 they were restored. They cover all the vaults of the church and are, unusually, both signed by the artist, Anders Johansson, and dated to 1498. Anders Johansson was a painter from Sweden, but could work in Skåne (at the time part of Denmark) because the two countries were united in the Kalmar Union.

The paintings depict different religious subjects, including the narrative of the creation, the fall of man, the life of Christ, different Christian martyrs, saints and angels.

== Furnishings ==
The church has a baptismal font from the 12th century, decorated with Romanesque ornaments. It was replaced in 1798 and put outside the church but since 1951, it is again used as the font of the church. Both the altarpiece and the pulpit date from the first half of the 18th century. Noteworthy is also the Romanesque sculpture in the tympanon above the western entrance, dating from the construction period of the church. It depicts the birth of Christ and a vision of the afterlife.
