= Elin Bergman =

Swedish singer (born 1995)

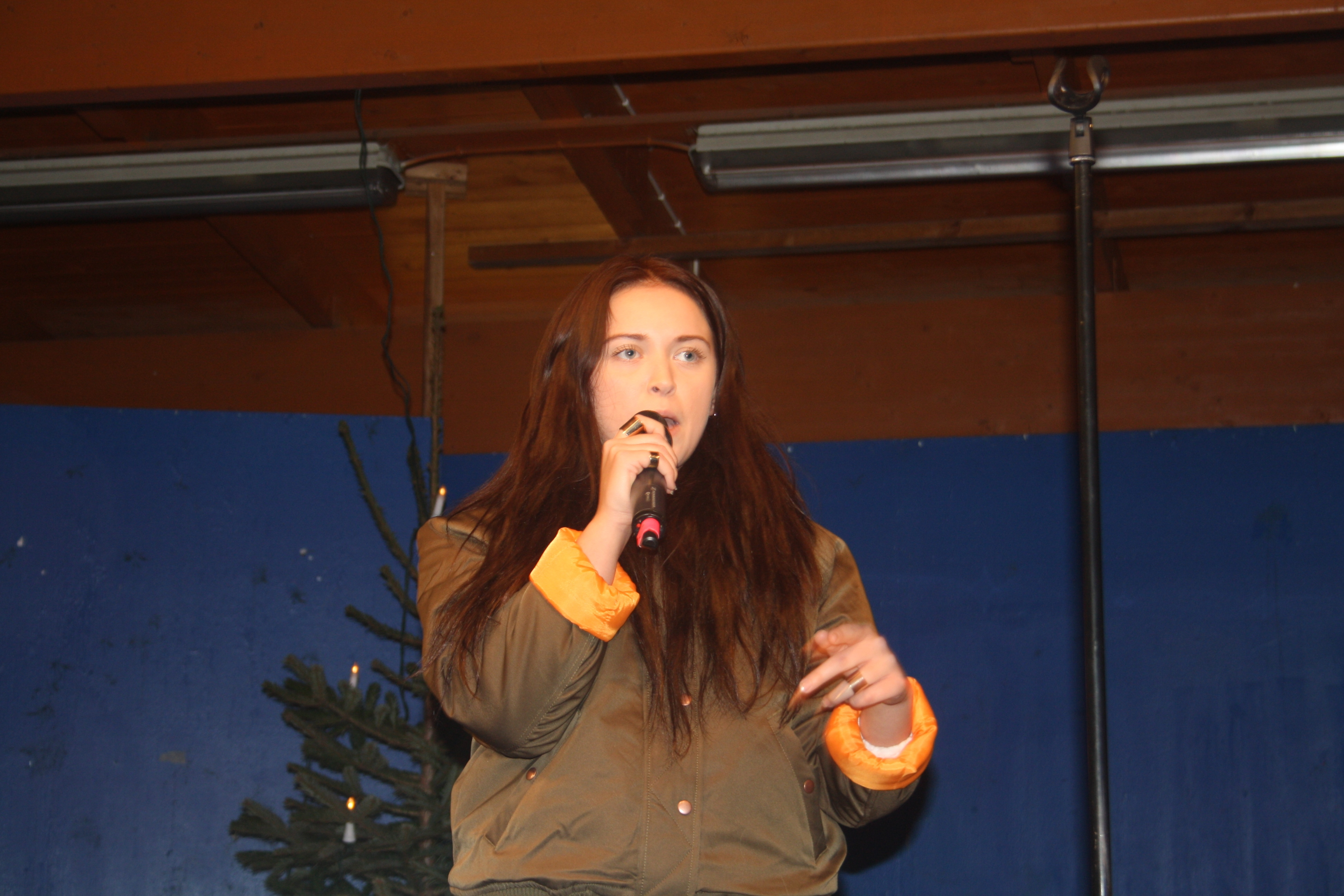
- Elin Bergman (2013)

Background information
- Born: Elin Johanna Bergman; 6 August 1995 (age 30)
- Origin: Umeå, Sweden
- Genres: Pop, Soul, Rap
- Occupation: Singer
- Years active: 2013–present

Elin Johanna Bergman (born 6 August 1995) is a Swedish singer. She was the first runner-up of the Swedish Idol 2013, losing to Kevin Walker.

During week 9 of the show, the contestants each composed and wrote a song alongside several established songwriters. The songs were then presented live at Idol, and Bergman's song "The Fire" managed to chart on Sverigetopplistan at number 19. Some of her songs, along with other contestants' songs, were released by Universal Music.

== Personal life ==
Bergman was born in Umeå.

== Discography ==
=== Singles ===
Year	Album	Peak positions	Certifications	Album
Year	Album	SWE	Certifications	Album
2013	"The Fire"	19	GLF: Gold	Non-album singles
2015	"Shoot You Down"	—		Non-album singles
2015	"Gasoline Dream"	—		Non-album singles
2015	"Lucky Strike"	—		Non-album singles
