= Belong (Kevin Walker album) =

Studio album by Kevin Walker
- Released: 2013

Belong is the debut studio album by Swedish soccer player-turned singer Kevin Walker after he won the 9th series of the Swedish version of Idol in 2013. The album's title is named after Walker's single with the same name, which he sang in the final of Idol in 2013. The album reached number 2 on Sverigetopplistan, the Official Swedish Albums Chart.

== Singles ==
The debut single "Belong" also made it to number 8 on the Swedish Singles Chart.

== Track list ==
1. "Belong" (3:02)
2. "Dreaming" (3:12)
3. "Pride (In the Name of Love)" (2:36)
4. "Say" (3:15)
5. "Välkommen in" (3:00)
6. "Don't Look Back In Anger" (3:34)
7. "Hall of Fame" (3:17)
8. "Free Fallin'" (3:19)
9. "Home" (3:12)
10. "Soldier" (3:05)
11. "Where the Streets Have No Name" (3:34)
12. "I Will Be Here" (3:43)

== Charts ==
Chart (2013)	Peak position
Swedish Albums (Sverigetopplistan)	2
