= Idol 2013 (Sweden) =

- Season 2013
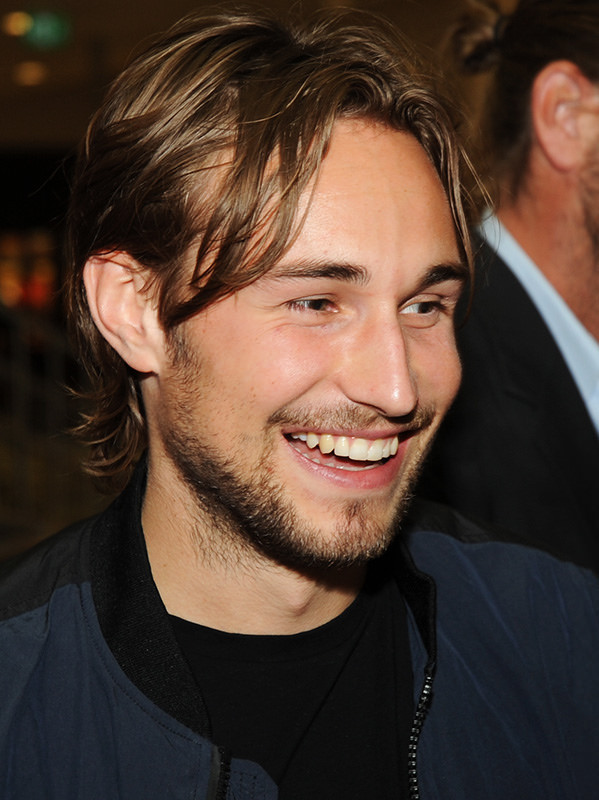
- Hosted by: Pär Lernström; Kakan Hermansson (sidekick)
- Judges: Anders Bagge; Laila Bagge Wahlgren; Alexander Bard
- Winner: Kevin Walker
- Runner-up: Elin Bergman

Release
- Original network: TV4
- Original release: August 19, 2013 – December 2013

Season chronology
- ← Previous; Season 2011 Next → Season 2014

Idol 2013 was the Swedish Idol series' ninth season which premiered on August 19, 2013. and ended on December 6, 2013. In January 2013, TV4 confirmed that the Idol series would be returning after a year's hiatus after Idol 2011.

The contestants included professional footballer Kevin Walker, who played in the Swedish second division for GIF Sundsvall. A few of Walker's matches with the team were moved to avoid a clash with his television commitments.

Winner of season nine was Kevin Walker.

== Elimination Chart ==
The diagram shows how each participant placed during the qualifying week and the weekly finals.

Stage:		Semi-Finals						Finals										
Date:		16/9	17/9	18/9	19/9	20/9		27/9	4/10	11/10	18/10	25/10	1/11	8/11	15/11	22/11	29/11	6/12
Place	Competitor	Result																
1	Kevin Walker																	Winner
2	Elin Bergman																	Runner-Up
3	Erik Rapp																out	
4	Jens Hult															out		
5	Sandra Wikström														out			
6	Matilda Melin													out				
7	Gabriel Alares	3:a				WC 4							out					
8	Miriam Bengtsson				3:a	WC 3						out						
9	Sara Sangfelt				3:a	WC 5					out							
10	George Shaid									out								
11	Sakib Zabbar			3:a		WC 2			out									
12	Sarah Mathisen				3:a	WC 1		out										
13	Juliette Holmqvist						out											
Semi	Oliver Cardoso			3:a			out											
Semi	Simen Thelander			3:a			out											
Semi	Arantxa Alvarez		3:a				out											
Semi	Sanne Karlsson		3:a				out											
Semi	Yosefin Buohler		3:a				out											
Semi	Albin Gummesson	3:a					out											
Semi	Gustav Bjule	3:a					out											

Legend
Top 12	Top 20	Wildcard contestant	Bottom 2	Eliminated	Quit	safe	Not participated
