= Moa Lignell =

Swedish singer (born 1994)

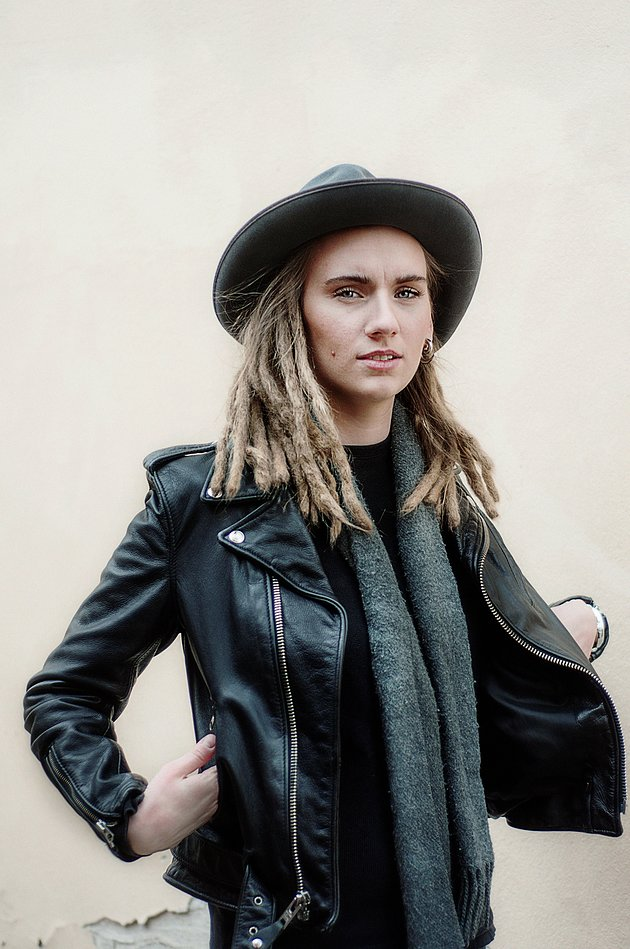

Background information
- Born: 6 June 1994 (age 31) Alingsås, Sweden
- Genres: Pop
- Occupation(s): Singer, songwriter
- Instrument(s): Vocals, guitar, piano
- Years active: 2011–present
- Labels: Universal Music

Moa Lignell (born 6 June 1994 in Alingsås, Sweden) is a Swedish singer, who came in third place in Idol 2011. Lignell released her first music single "When I Held Ya" after competing with the song during her time on Idol in2011. Lignell has since then released the two studio albums Different Path and Ladie's man. She has also released the singles "Whatever They Do", "Born to Be" and "If Someone", the latter from 2020.

== Discography ==
=== Albums ===
Year	Album	Peak chart positions	Certification
Year	Album	SWE	Certification
2012	Different Path	2	—
2015	Ladies' Man	—	—

=== Singles ===
Year	Single	Peak chart positions	Album
Year	Single	SWE	Album
2012	"When I Held Ya"	4	Different Path
2012	"Whatever They Do"	—	Different Path
2020	"Born To Be"	—	TBA
2020	"If Someone"	—	TBA
