= Belong Ltd =

British care home provider based in Nantwich

Belong Ltd is a British care home provider based in Nantwich. It is a registered charity.

It operates care villages in Atherton, Crewe, Macclesfield, Wigan and Warrington. Typically they offer enhanced sheltered housing, close care housing and care home with nursing on the same site. Belong Morris Feinmann, in Didsbury, opened in June 2017 and a village in Newcastle-under-Lyme opened in 2018.

The Manchester facility is supported by the Feinmann Trust and replaces the Morris Feinmann Home which was run by the trust from 1947 until 2013. It offers facilities for the North West Jewish Community. Two of the residents were awarded the British Empire Medal in the 2020 New Year Honours for their services to Holocaust Education.

Planning permission was granted for a new Belong care village in Chester in 2017. It will have six households (with 72 suites and 3 guest bedrooms in total) with 24-hour care, including specialist dementia and nursing support, and 23 one and two bedroom apartments for independent living. There will also be a gym, bistro, hair salon and therapy rooms open to the public. Development was halted by the collapse of the contractor, Pochin, but resumed in 2020. There will also be a specialist daycare service.

A similar development in Birkdale was also halted by the collapse of Pochin. It was restarted by Cruden Construction in June 2020.

The COVID-19 pandemic in England was very stressful for people in these facilities. The 66 residents of Belong Wigan were given a personalised cushion with a picture of a friend or family member made by SKILS CIC, a social enterprise based in Wigan. The company employs a fitness instructor, who devised exercise plans for resident who were shielded and unable to use the facilities in the gym. They also run a ‘Belong Active’ YouTube channel and regular "experience days", which include the provision of arts and crafts, exercise sessions and poetry readings.

There are licensed drinking venues on site at every Belong care village.
