= Belonging (2004 film) =

2004 TV play

- DVD cover
- Genre: Drama
- Created by: Stevie Davies, Alan Plater
- Based on: The Web of Belonging by Stevie Davies
- Written by: Stevie Davies, Alan Plater
- Directed by: Christopher Menaul
- Starring: Brenda Blethyn; Kevin Whately; Rosemary Harris; Anna Massey; Peter Sallis; Jill Baker; Fiona O'Shaughnessy; Matthew Marsh
- Theme music composer: Martyn Swain
- Composer: Martyn Swain
- Country of origin: United Kingdom

Production
- Producers: Jenny Edwards, Joanne Gueritz, Jeanna Polley
- Production locations: Shrewsbury, Shropshire, UK
- Cinematography: David Katznelson
- Editor: Jon Costelloe
- Running time: 96 minutes
- Production company: The Producers Films

Original release
- Network: ITV
- Release: 12 September 2004

Belonging is a 2004 TV play starring Brenda Blethyn, Kevin Whately, Rosemary Harris, Anna Massey, Peter Sallis, Jill Baker, Fiona O'Shaughnessy and Matthew Marsh. The play is based on Stevie Davies's novel The Web of Belonging.

== Plot ==
A middle-aged man, Jacob Copplestone, decides to leave his middle-aged wife, Jess, to whom he has been married for twenty years, and go to live with a younger woman. Jess Copplestone is then left to look after Jacob's elderly relatives, including Nathan, May and Brenda. Jess struggles so much that Nathan decides to leave the house to go to live in a house with other elderly people, to try to make life easier for Jess. After May has another accident in her home, Jacob apologises to Jess, and they decide to put May in a nursing home. They also decide that Brenda should go to live in the same place as Nathan.

== Cast ==
- Brenda Blethyn as Jess Copplestone
- Kevin Whately as Jacob Copplestone
- Rosemary Harris as May
- Anna Massey as Brenda
- Peter Sallis as Nathan
- Jill Baker as Cathy
- Fiona O’Shaughnessy as Stephanie
- Matthew Marsh as Peter Fox
- Maisy Taylor as Nella
- Tom Bennett as PC Cowley
- Joe Van Moyland as Luke
- Roisin Rae as Waitress
- Eliza Hunt as Jane Ventress
- Muriel Pavlow as Dorothy
- Helen Masters as Hazel
- Poppy Lee Friar as Lara
- Daniel Chenery as Fergus
- Bindu De Stoppani as Nurse
- Liz Moscrop as Mrs Jenkins
- Joanna David as Averil
- Teresa Churcher as DC Sinclair
- Miroslav Mitrovic as Nouvelles Recrues (uncredited)
- Tomislav Mitrovic as Nouvelles Recrues (uncredited)
- Robert Stone as Polish bodyguard (uncredited)

== Release ==
Belonging was screened on ITV on 12 September 2004. Acorn TV and ITV later released it on DVD on 26 July 2010.
