= Amanda Fondell =

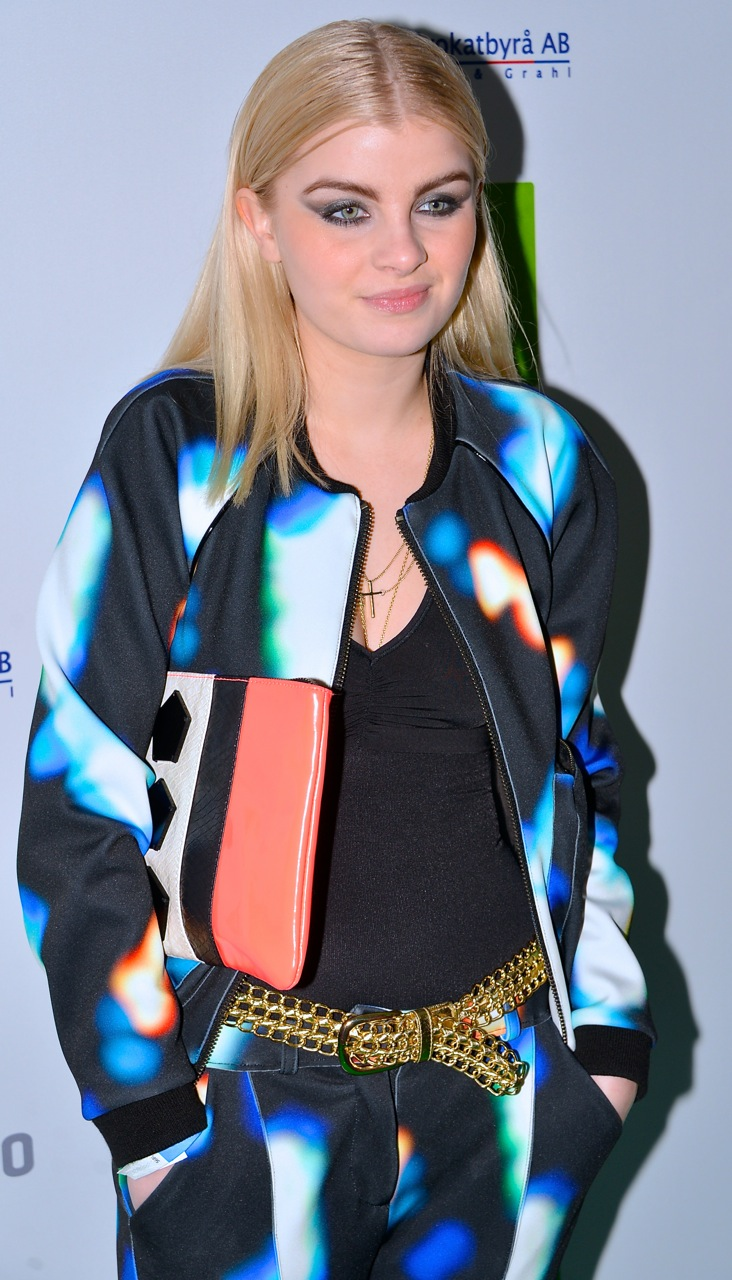
- Amanda Fondell in 2013

Background information
- Born: Amanda Linnea Fondell; 29 August 1994 (age 32)
- Origin: Linderöd, Sweden
- Genres: Pop, soul, rock
- Occupation: Singer
- Years active: 2011–present

Amanda Linnea Fondell (born 29 August 1994, Linderöd, Sweden) is a Swedish singer and winner of the eighth series of Swedish Idol, which she won on 9 December 2011 with 52% of the votes.

Fondell's first single "All This Way" was released on 2 December 2011. The song was written and produced by Idol 2004 runner up Darin Zanyar, among others.

== Discography ==
=== Albums ===
Title	Year	Peak chart positions	Certifications
Title	Year	SWE	Certifications
All This Way	Released: 19 December 2011; Label: Universal Music; Formats: CD, digital download	1	GLF: Gold
Because I Am	Released: 7 November 2014; Label: King Island Roxystars Recordings; Formats: Digital download, streaming	—	

=== Extended plays ===
Title	Year
Pt. 1 Let Me Introduce You to My Thoughts	Released: 29 May 2020; Label: Self-released; Formats: Digital download, streaming

=== Singles ===
Title	Year	Peak chart positions	Certifications	Album
Title	Year	SWE	Certifications	Album
"All This Way"	2011	1	GLF: 3× Platinum	All This Way
"Bastard"	2012	—		Non-album single
"Dumb"	2013	49		Melodifestivalen 2013
"Let the Rain Fall"	2013	—		Because I Am
"Keep The Love"	2014	—		Because I Am
"You Better Give Up Now"	2014	—		Because I Am
"Naked"	2017	—		In a Talk With Nature
"Count on You"	2017	—		In a Talk With Nature
"Crown"	2018	—		Non-album singles
"Heart of Glass"	2019	—		Non-album singles
"Reckless"	2019	—		Pt. 1 Let Me Introduce You to My Thoughts
"Sympathy"	2019	—		Pt. 1 Let Me Introduce You to My Thoughts
"Widescreen"	2020	—		Pt. 1 Let Me Introduce You to My Thoughts
"Twist"	2020	—		Pt. 1 Let Me Introduce You to My Thoughts
"Baby"	2021	—		TBA
"One Rule"	2021	—		TBA
"—" denotes a release that did not chart or was not released in that territory.

=== Other charted songs ===
Title	Year	Peak chart positions	Album
Title	Year	SWE	Album
"Hey Ya!"	2011	44	All This Way
"Made Of"	2012	35	All This Way
"True Colors"	2012	43	All This Way
