= Linderöd =

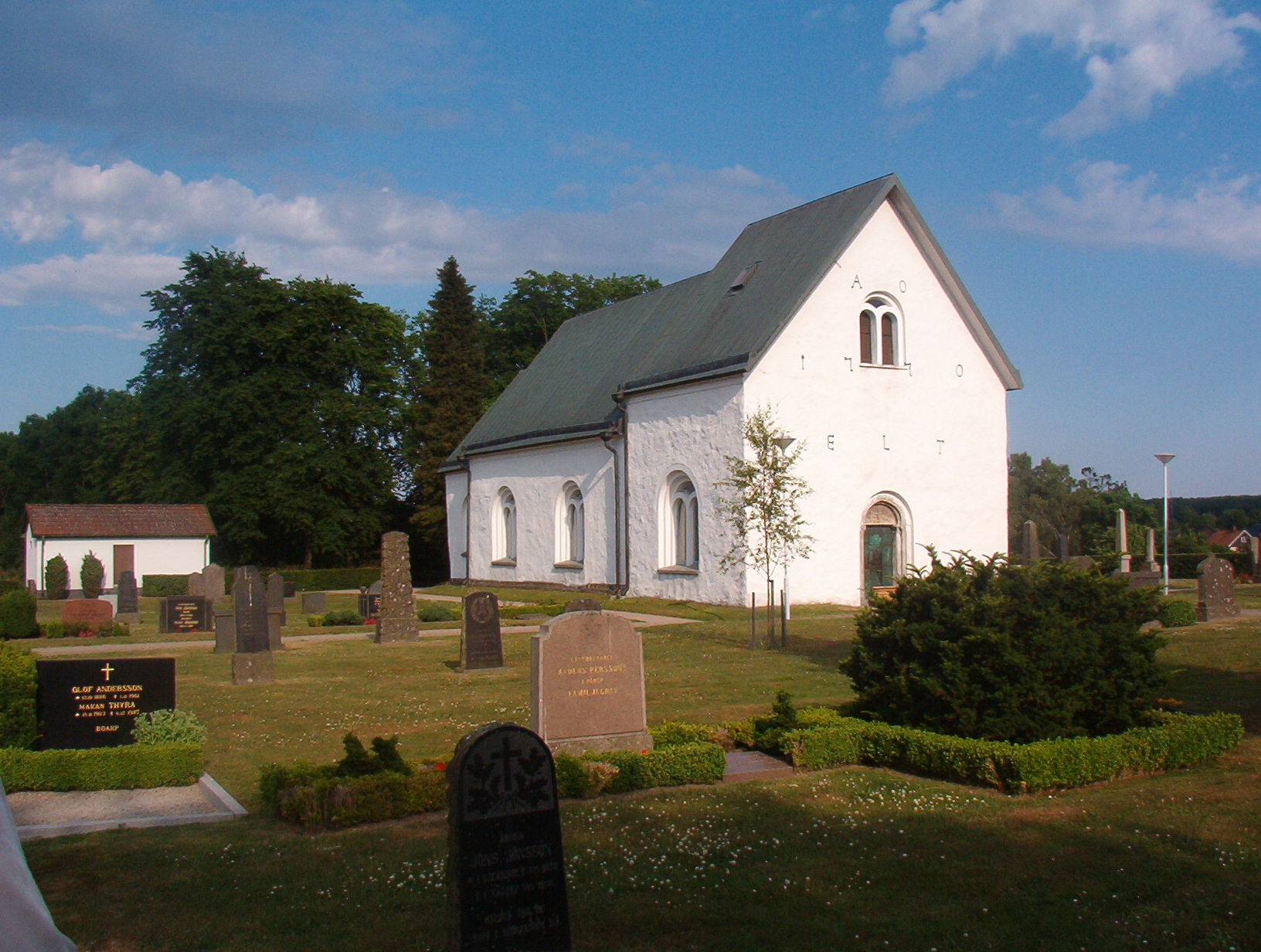
- Linderöd Church

- Location within Skåne Location within Sweden
- Coordinates: 55°56′N 13°49′E
- Country: Sweden
- Province: Skåne
- County: Skåne County
- Municipality: Kristianstad Municipality

Area
  - Total: 0.76 km^{2} (0.29 sq mi)

Population (31 December 2010)
  - Total: 404
  - Density: 533/km^{2} (1,380/sq mi)
- Time zone: UTC+1 (CET)
  - Summer (DST): UTC+2 (CEST)

Linderöd is a locality situated in Kristianstad Municipality, Skåne County, Sweden with 404 inhabitants in 2010.

Linderöd Church contains a large number of medieval frescos, discovered in 1929 and restored in 1950.
