= Idol 2011 (Sweden) =

- Season 2011
- Hosted by: Pär Lernström
- Judges: Anders Bagge; Laila Bagge Wahlgren; Alexander Bard; Pelle Lidell.
- Winner: Amanda Fondell
- Runner-up: Robin Stjernberg
- Finals venue: Ericsson Globe

Release
- Original network: TV4
- Original release: 4 September – 9 December 2011

Season chronology
- ← Previous; Season 2010 Next → Season 2013

Idol 2011 was the Swedish Idol series' eight season and premiered on TV4 on 4 September 2011. Pär Lernström was the new host of the series, after Peter Jihde declined to return as host after Idol 2010. Two of the judges from earlier year returned, namely Anders Bagge and Laila Bagge Wahlgren, were joined in with two new judges, Alexander Bard and Pelle Lidell.

Winner of season eight was Amanda Fondell with Robin Stjernberg as first runner-up and Moa Lignell as second runner-up. Following the completion of this season, TV4 decided to put Idol on indefinite hiatus. In January 2013, TV4 announced that Idol would return in 2013.

== Quarter-finals ==
=== Quarter-Final 1 ===
Original Airdate
26 September 2011

Order	Contestant	Song (Original Artist)	Result
1	Robin Stjernberg	"Breakeven" (The Script)	Top 12
2	Leonard Löfstrand	"Save the World" (Swedish House Mafia)	Eliminated
3	Jafet Samson	"With You" (Chris Brown)	Eliminated
4	Hampus Engelhardt	"You Found Me" (The Fray)	Eliminated
5	Maikel Yüksel	"Moves Like Jagger" (Maroon 5)	Top 12

=== Quarter-Final 2 ===
Original Airdate
27 September 2011

Order	Contestant	Song (Original Artist)	Result
1	Amanda Fondell	"Womanizer" (Britney Spears)	Top 12
2	Frida Josefsson	"Hide Your Heart" (Kiss)	Eliminated
3	Amanda Persson	"Decode" (Paramore)	Wild Card
4	Denise Azemi Brasjö	"Someone Like You" (Adele)	Wild Card
5	Moa Lignell	"Price Tag" (Jessie J)	Top 12

=== Quarter-Final 3 ===
Original Airdate
28 September 2011

Order	Contestant	Song (Original Artist)	Result
1	Tony Weseth	"In Love with a Girl" (Gavin Degraw)	Eliminated
2	Mikael Fogelberg	"Heartbeats" (The Knife)	Eliminated
3	Emil Elton	"Dum Av Dig" (Daniel Adams-Ray)	Wild Card
4	André Zuniga-Asplund	"No Woman No Cry" (Bob Marley)	Top 12
5	Olle Hammar	"The Man Who Can't Be Moved" (The Script)	Top 12

=== Quarter-Final 4 ===
Original Airdate
29 September 2011

Order	Contestant	Song (Original Artist)	Result
1	Dourina Arhzaf	"Fighter" (Christina Aguilera)	Eliminated
2	Linni Barresjö	"The Edge of Glory" (Lady Gaga)	Top 12
3	Roshana Hoss	"My Heart is Refusing Me" (Loreen)	Wild Card
4	Magdalena Reis	"I Have Nothing" (Whitney Houston)	Eliminated
5	Molly Pettersson Hammar	"A Woman's Worth" (Alicia Keys)	Top 12

== Semi-final ==
Original Airdate
30 September

Order	Contestant	Song (Original Artist)	Result
1	Molly Pettersson Hammar	"Where the Streets Have No Name" (U2)	Safe
2	André Zuniga-Asplund	"Closer" (Ne-Yo)	Safe
3	Roshana Hoss	"Separate Ways" (Journey)	Safe
4	Maikel Yüksel	"Carrie" (Europe)	Eliminated
5	Robin Stjernberg	"Animal" (Neon Trees)	Safe
6	Amanda Persson	"Empire State of Mind" (Alicia Keys)	Safe
7	Olle Hammar	"The Scientist" (Coldplay)	Safe
8	Amanda Fondell	"Hey Ya!" (OutKast)	Safe
9	Denise Azemi Brasjö	"Carry You Home" (James Blunt)	Safe
10	Moa Lignell	"Make You Feel My Love" (Bob Dylan)	Safe
11	Linni Barresjö	"She Will Be Loved" (Maroon 5)	Safe
12	Emil Elton	"Isn't She Lovely" (Stevie Wonder)	Safe

== Finals ==
=== Finalists ===
(ages stated at time of contest)

Contestant	Age	Hometown	Voted Off	Spectacular Theme
Amanda Fondell	16	Linderöd	Winner	Finale
Robin Stjernberg	20	Furuboda	9 December 2011	Finale
Moa Lignell	17	Alingsås	2 December 2011	Judge's Choice
Molly Pettersson Hammar	15	Stockholm	25 November 2011	Love Songs
Amanda Persson	15	Erkö	18 November 2011	My Breakthrough
André Zuniga-Asplund	17	Uppsala	11 November 2011	Motown
Olle Hammar	15	Stockholm	4 November 2011	Audition Song
Linni Barresjö	16	Rimbo	28 October 2011	Big Band
Emil Elton	16	Askim	21 October 2011	Hits from Superstars to Sweden
Denise Azemi Brasjö	17	Karlshamn	14 October 2011	Swedish Hits
Roshana Hoss	18	Stockholm	7 October 2011	Charts 2011

=== Top 11 – Charts 2011 ===
Original Airdate
7 October 2011

Order	Contestant	Song (Original Artist)	Result
1	André Zuniga-Asplund	"The Lazy Song" (Bruno Mars)	Safe
2	Linni Barresjö	"What Are Words" (Chris Medina)	Safe
3	Roshana Hoss	"Call Your Girlfriend" (Robyn)	Eliminated
4	Emil Elton	"Every Teardrop Is A Waterfall" (Coldplay)	Safe
5	Amanda Fondell	"Made of" (Nause)	Safe
6	Denise Azemi Brasjö	"The Moment I Met You" (Vincent Pontare)	Bottom two
7	Olle Hammar	"Highway Man" (Hoffmaestro & Chraa)	Safe
8	Moa Lignell	"Fuckin' Perfect" (Pink)	Safe
9	Robin Stjernberg	"California King Bed" (Rihanna)	Safe
10	Molly Pettersson Hammar	"Set Fire to the Rain" (Adele)	Safe
11	Amanda Persson	"Without You" (David Guetta ft. Usher)	Safe

=== Top 10 – Swedish Hits ===
Original Airdate
14 October 2011

Order	Contestant	Song (Original Artist)	Result
1	Moa Lignell	"Vem Ska Jag Tro På" (Thomas DiLeva)	Safe
2	Denise Azemi Brasjö	"Från Och Med Du" (Oskar Linnros)	Eliminated
3	Olle Hammar	"17 år" (Veronica Maggio)	Bottom two
4	Linni Barresjö	"Om Sanningen Ska Fram " (Eric Amarillo)	Safe
5	Amanda Persson	"Utan Dina Andetag" (Kent)	Safe
6	Robin Stjernberg	"Alla Vill Till Himmelen Men Ingen Vill Dö" (Timbuktu)	Safe
7	Molly Pettersson Hammar	"Satan I Gatan" (Veronica Maggio)	Safe
8	André Zuniga-Asplund	"Lilla Lady" (Daniel Adams-Ray)	Safe
9	Amanda Fondell	"Det Hon Vill Ha" (Plura)	Safe
10	Emil Elton	"Jag Är En Vampyr" (Markus Krunegård)	Safe

=== Top 9 – Hits from Superstar to Sweden ===
Original Airdate
21 October 2011

Order	Contestant	Song (Original Artist)	Result
1	Amanda Fondell	"Jolene" (Dolly Parton)	Safe
2	Emil Elton	"Cry Me a River" (Justin Timberlake)	Eliminated
3	Linni Barresjö	"Angels" (Robbie Williams)	Safe
4	Molly Pettersson Hammar	"Only Girl (In The World)" (Rihanna)	Safe
5	André Zuniga-Asplund	"Tiny Dancer" (Elton John)	Safe
6	Amanda Persson	"Heroes" (David Bowie)	Bottom two
7	Robin Stjernberg	"Halo" (Beyoncé)	Safe
8	Olle Hammar	"Beat It" (Michael Jackson)	Safe
9	Moa Lignell	"Superstition" (Stevie Wonder)	Safe

=== Top 8 – Big Band ===
Original Airdate
28 October 2011

Order	Contestant	Song (Original Artist)	Result
1	Molly Pettersson Hammar	"Natural Woman" (Aretha Franklin)	Safe
2	Linni Barresjö	"Dark Lady" (Cher)	Eliminated
3	Robin Stjernberg	"When a Man Loves a Woman" (Percy Sledge)	Safe
4	André Zuniga-Asplund	"Oh! Carol" (Neil Sedaka)	Bottom two
5	Moa Lignell	"Dream a Little Dream of Me" (Mamas and the Papas)	Safe
6	Olle Hammar	"Back to Black" (Amy Winehouse)	Safe
7	Amanda Fondell	"I've Got a Woman" (Ray Charles)	Safe
8	Amanda Persson	"Fever" (Peggy Lee)	Safe

=== Top 7 – Audition Song ===
Original Airdate
4 November 2011

Order	Contestant	Song (Original Artist)	Result
1	Olle Hammar	"Feeling Good" (Michael Bublé)	Eliminated
2	Amanda Fondell	"My Man" (Miss Li)	Safe
3	André Zuniga-Asplund	"Here I Come" / "Från Och Med Du" (Barrington Levy / Oskar Linnros)	Safe
4	Amanda Persson	"Keep On Walking" (Salem Al Fakir)	Bottom two
5	Robin Stjernberg	"Who You Are" (Jessie J)	Safe
6	Molly Pettersson Hammar	"White Light Moment" (Tove Styrke)	Safe
7	Moa Lignell	"When I Held ya" (Moa Lignell)	Safe

=== Top 6 – Motown ===
Original Airdate
11 November 2011

Order	Contestant	Song (Original Artist)	Result
1	Amanda Persson	"I'm Coming Out" (Diana Ross)	Bottom two
2	André Zuniga-Asplund	"My Girl" (The Temptations)	Eliminated
3	Moa Lignell	"You Can't Hurry Love" (The Supremes)	Safe
4	Amanda Fondell	"Please Mr. Postman" (The Marvelettes)	Safe
5	Robin Stjernberg	"Reach Out, I'll Be There" (The Four Tops)	Safe
6	Molly Pettersson Hammar	"Nowhere to Run" (Martha and the Vandellas)	Safe

=== Top 5 – My Breakthrough ===
Original Airdate
18 November 2011

Order	Contestant	Song (Original Artist)	Result
1	Robin Stjernberg	"Bohemian Rhapsody" (Queen)	Safe
1	Robin Stjernberg	"Pride (In the Name of Love)" (U2)	Safe
2	Amanda Fondell	"Piece of My Heart" (Janis Joplin)	Bottom two
2	Amanda Fondell	"(I Can't Get No) Satisfaction" (Rolling Stones)	Bottom two
3	Molly Petterson Hammar	"Mama Knows Best" (Jessie J)	Safe
3	Molly Petterson Hammar	"Listen" (Beyoncé Knowles)	Safe
4	Amanda Persson	"Since U Been Gone" (Kelly Clarkson)	Eliminated
4	Amanda Persson	"No One" (Alicia Keys)	Eliminated
5	Moa Lignell	"Go Your Own Way" (Fleetwood Mac)	Safe
5	Moa Lignell	"Fields Of Gold" (Sting)	Safe

=== Top 4 – Love Songs ===
Original Airdate
25 November 2011

Order	Contestant	Song (Original Artist)	Result
1	Molly Petterson Hammar	"Titanium" (David Guetta ft. Sia)	Eliminated
1	Molly Petterson Hammar	"If I Ain't Got You" (Alicia Keys)	Eliminated
2	Moa Lignell	"Nothing Compares 2 U" (Sinéad O'Connor)	Safe
2	Moa Lignell	"Carry You Home" (James Blunt)	Safe
3	Amanda Fondell	"Fire" (Bruce Springsteen)	Safe
3	Amanda Fondell	"True Colors" (Cyndi Lauper)	Safe
4	Robin Stjernberg	"Let Me Entertain You" (Robbie Williams)	Safe
4	Robin Stjernberg	"You Raise Me Up" (Josh Groban)	Safe

=== Top 3 – Judge's Choice ===
Original Airdate
2 December 2011

Order	Contestant	Song (Original Artist)	Result
1	Robin Stjernberg	"Dedication to My Ex (Miss That)" (Lloyd)	Safe
1	Robin Stjernberg	"Love Is Gone" (David Guetta & Chris Willis)	Safe
2	Moa Lignell	"Torn" (Natalie Imbruglia)	Eliminated
2	Moa Lignell	"Wherever You Will Go" (The Calling)	Eliminated
3	Amanda Fondell	"It's Oh So Quiet" (Björk)	Safe
3	Amanda Fondell	"Raise Your Glass" (Pink)	Safe

=== Top 2 – Finale ===
Original Airdate
9 December 2011

Order	Contestant	Song (Original Artist)	Result	Voting %
1	Robin Stjernberg	"In My Head" (Jason Derulo)	Runner-up	48%
1	Robin Stjernberg	"Halo" (Beyoncé Knowles)	Runner-up	48%
1	Robin Stjernberg	"All This Way" (Winner's Single)	Runner-up	48%
2	Amanda Fondell	"Song 2" (Blur)	Winner	52%
2	Amanda Fondell	"Made Of" (Nause)	Winner	52%
2	Amanda Fondell	"All This Way" (Winner's Single)	Winner	52%

== Elimination chart ==
Legend
Did Not Perform	Female	Male	Top 24	Wild Card	Top 11	Winner

Safe	Save Last	Eliminated

Stage:		Quarter				Wild; Card	Semi	Finals									
Week:		26 Sep	27 Sep	28 Sep	29 Sep	30 Sep		7 Oct	14 Oct	21 Oct	28 Oct	4 Nov	11 Nov	18 Nov	25 Nov	2 Dec	9 Dec
Place	Contestant	Result															
1	Amanda Fondell		Top 12											Btm 2			Winner
2	Robin Stjernberg	Top 12															Runner-up
3	Moa Lignell		Top 12													Elim	
4	Molly Pettersson Hammar				Top 12										Elim		
5	Amanda Persson		Elim			JC				Btm 2		Btm 2	Btm 2	Elim			
6	André Zuniga-Asplund			Top 12							Btm 2		Elim				
7	Olle Hammar			Top 12					Btm 2			Elim					
8	Linni Barresjö				Top 12						Elim						
9	Emil Elton			Elim		JC				Elim							
10	Denise Azemi Brasjö		Elim			JC		Btm 2	Elim								
11	Roshana Hoss				Elim	JC		Elim									
12	Maikel Yüksel	Top 12					Elim										
Quarter- Final 4	Dounia Arhzaf				Elim												
Quarter- Final 4	Madgalena Reise				Elim												
Quarter- Final 3	Mikael Fogelberg			Elim													
Quarter- Final 3	Tony Weseth			Elim													
Quarter- Final 2	Frida Josefsson		Elim														
Quarter- Final 1	Hampus Engelhardt	Elim															
Quarter- Final 1	Jafet Samson	Elim															
Quarter- Final 1	Leonard Löfstrand	Elim															
