= Capitol Music Group Sweden =

Swedish record label

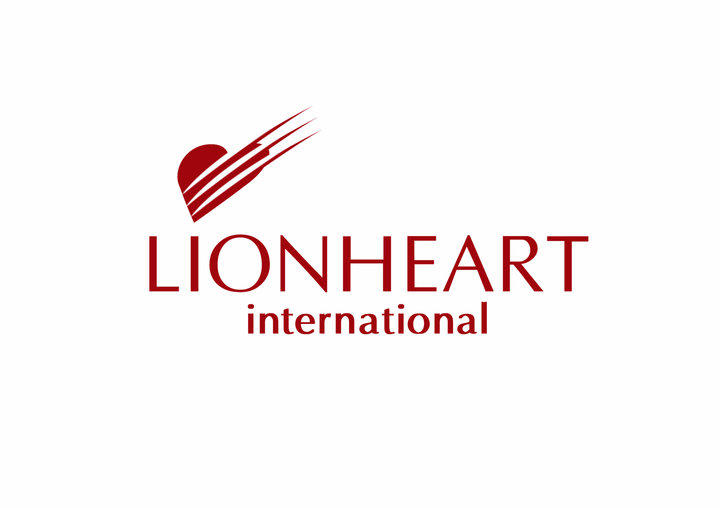
- Industry: Music & entertainment
- Founded: 1990
- Headquarters: Stockholm, Sweden
- Area served: Sweden
- Key people: Bobby Ljunggren; Maria Molin Ljunggren, Robert Olausson
- Parent: Universal Music Group
- Divisions: Capitol Records Sweden; Virgin Records Sweden; Lionheart; Sofo Records; Kavalkad; Live; Lionheart Music
- Website: capitolmusicgroup.se

Capitol Music Group Sweden is a Swedish music company which forms part of Universal Music Sweden. The company was formed following Universal Music Sweden's full ownership acquisition of Lionheart Music Group. The company consists of several record labels as well as operations in music production and publishing, artist management, and live-entertainment production.

The same trademark is used by an unrelated United States–based Capitol Music Group, also of Universal Music Group, which in turn is based upon, and consists of, the American label Capitol Records. Capitol Records Group Sweden also operates its own "Capitol Records Sweden" label proper.

== Background ==
=== Founding of Lionheart International ===
The Lionheart International record label was established in 1990. Lionheart has a dance record label called "Kavalkad" and an electro/dance/pop/rock record label called "SoFo Records". In 2002 they started a collaboration with Mariann Grammofon (Warner Music Group) that resulted in "M&L Records".

=== Launch of music publishing and involvement with Universal Music Group ===
In 2002, a music publishing arm, known as Lionheart Music, was set up to primarily serve the signed artists to the group's labels. The publishing business grew quickly that the following year, that an administration agreement was struck with Bonnier Music Publishing for Lionheart Music's song publishing catalogue.

In 2007, Universal Music Group International acquired a majority stake in Lionheart Music Group.

=== Lionheart Music Group as a single company ===
Logo of Lionheart Music Group (2011-2014)

In 2011, a three-way merger was formed between the three legal entities of the Lionheart group of companies—record label Lionheart International, music publisher Lionheart Music and artist management and booking company "Molin Ljunggren Productions" MLP—creating Lionheart Music Group.

=== Full acquisition by Universal Music Group and relaunch ===
Universal Music Sweden acquired the remaining interest in Lionheart Music Group. In September 2014, Lionheart Music Group was restructured—including being combined with other domestic repertoire operations within Universal Music Sweden—and relaunched as Capitol Music Group Sweden. The umbrella label group includes the Lionheart record label, as well as the Universal Music Group-owned EMI legacy labels Capitol Records and Virgin Records being utilised for domestic repertoire.

== Record labels ==
- Capitol Records Sweden
- Virgin Records Sweden
- Lionheart
- Sofo Records
- Kavalkad

== Music publishing and production ==
- Lionheart Music

== Artist management and live-entertainment ==
- Live

== Signed artists ==
- Lisa Ajax
- Robin Stjernberg
- Polina Gagarina
- The Band Perry
- Tim McGraw
- Dolly Style
- Lena Meyer-Landrut
- Alexander Rybak
- Maria Mittet
- Hera Björk
- Gravitonas
- Timoteij
- Anna Bergendahl
- Brandur Enni
- Sonja Aldén
- Sanna Nielsen
- Shirley Clamp
- Nanne Grönvall
- Jill Johnson
- The Poodles
- Anne-Lie Rydé
- Elisa's
- CajsaStina Åkerström
- Zekes
- Caroline Wennergren
- Rascal Flatts
