= Playing with Fire =

Playing with Fire may refer to:

== Film ==
- Playing with Fire (1916 film), an American silent film
- Playing with Fire (1921 German film), a silent comedy-drama film
- Playing with Fire (1921 American film), a silent comedy film
- Playing with Fire (1934 film), a German film
- Playing with Fire (1975 film), a French-Italian film
- Playing with Fire (1985 film), an American TV film starring Gary Coleman
- Playing with Fire (2008 film), a film by David DeCoteau
- Playing with Fire (2019 film), a film directed by Andy Fickman
- Dangerous Encounters of the First Kind, a 1980 Hong Kong film released in some regions as Playing with Fire

== Literature ==
=== Fiction ===
- Playing with Fire (Robinson novel), a 2004 Inspector Banks novel by Peter Robinson
- Playing with Fire (Vailland novel), a 1945 novel by Roger Vailland
- Skulduggery Pleasant: Playing with Fire, a 2008 novel by Derek Landy
- Playing with Fire, a novel by Melody Carlson
- Playing with Fire, a 1997 novel by Esther Friesner
- Playing with Fire, a 2015 novel by Tess Gerritsen
- Playing with Fire, a 2015 novel by Renee Graziano
- Playing with Fire, a 1983 novel by Jo Jung-rae
- Playing with Fire, a 1981 novel by Charlotte Lamb writing as Sheila Holland
- Playing with Fire, a 2002 novel by Henning Mankell
- Playing with Fire, a 2008 novel by Francine Pascal
- Playing with Fire, a 2017 novel by Katie Price
- Playing with Fire, a 1990 novel by Dani Shapiro
- Playing with Fire, a 2006 novel by Gena Showalter
- Playing with Fire, a 2013 novel by Kerry Wilkinson
- "Playing with Fire", a 1900 short story by Arthur Conan Doyle

=== Nonfiction ===
- Playing with Fire (Fleury book), a 2009 autobiography by Theoren Fleury
- Playing with Fire (Weldon and Bjornstad book), a 1984 Christian book by John Weldon and James Bjornstad
- Playing with Fire: Queer Politics, Queer Theories, a 1997 essay collection edited by Shane Phelan
- Playing with Fire, a 2004 autobiography by Nasser Hussain
- Playing with Fire: The 1968 Election and the Transformation of American Politics, a 2017 book by Lawrence O'Donnell

=== Drama ===
- Playing with Fire (Edgar play), a 2005 play by David Edgar
- Playing with Fire, an 1893 play by August Strindberg

=== Poetry ===
- Playing with Fire, a 2006 poetry collection by Grevel Lindop

== Music ==
=== Albums ===
- Playing with Fire (Aria album) or the title song, 1989
- Playing with Fire (Kevin Federline album) or the title song, 2006
- Playing with Fire (Jennifer Nettles album) or the title song, 2016
- Playing with Fire (Spacemen 3 album), 1989
- Playing w/ Fire, an EP by Redveil, 2023
- Playing with Fire, by Dervish, 1995
- Playing with Fire, by Dave Kilminster, 2004
- Playing with Fire, by Frank Yamma and Piranpa, 1999
- Playing with Fire, by Paula Seling and Ovi, 2010

=== Songs ===
- "Playing with Fire" (Blackpink song), 2016
- "Playing with Fire" (Darin song), 2013
- "Playing with Fire" (Liam Cacatian Thomassen song), 2016
- "Playing with Fire" (N-Dubz song), 2010
- "Playing with Fire" (Paula Seling and Ovi song), 2010
- "Playing with Fire" (Plan B song), 2012
- "Playing with Fire", by Brad Paisley from Play: The Guitar Album, 2008
- "Playing with Fire", by Brandon Flowers from Flamingo, 2010
- "Playing with Fire", by Bullet for My Valentine from Temper Temper, 2013
- "Playing with Fire", by Chelsea Grin from Ashes to Ashes, 2014
- "Playing with Fire", by Crowded House from Dreamers Are Waiting, 2021
- "Playing with Fire", by Dead by April from Worlds Collide, 2017
- "Playing with Fire", by Emery from The Question, 2005
- "Playing with Fire", by Forever the Sickest Kids from J.A.C.K., 2013
- "Playing with Fire", by Gina, Dale Haze and the Champions, 1985
- "Playing with Fire", by Godflesh from Decline & Fall, 2014
- "Playing with Fire", by Lil Wayne from Tha Carter III, 2008
- "Playing with Fire", by Richard Marx from Rush Street, 1991
- "Playing with Fire", by Shannon Curfman from Loud Guitars, Big Suspicions, 1999
- "Playing with Fire", by Thomas Rhett from Tangled Up, 2015

== Television ==
=== Series ===
- Playing with Fire (2013 TV series), an American reality documentary series
- Playing with Fire (2019 TV series), an American Netflix series

=== Episodes ===
- "Playing with Fire" (The Bill)
- "Playing with Fire" (Dante's Cove)
- "Playing with Fire" (NCIS)
- "Playing with Fire" (SeaChange)

== See also ==
- Play with Fire (disambiguation)
