= Patrik Jean =

Swedish singer and songwriter

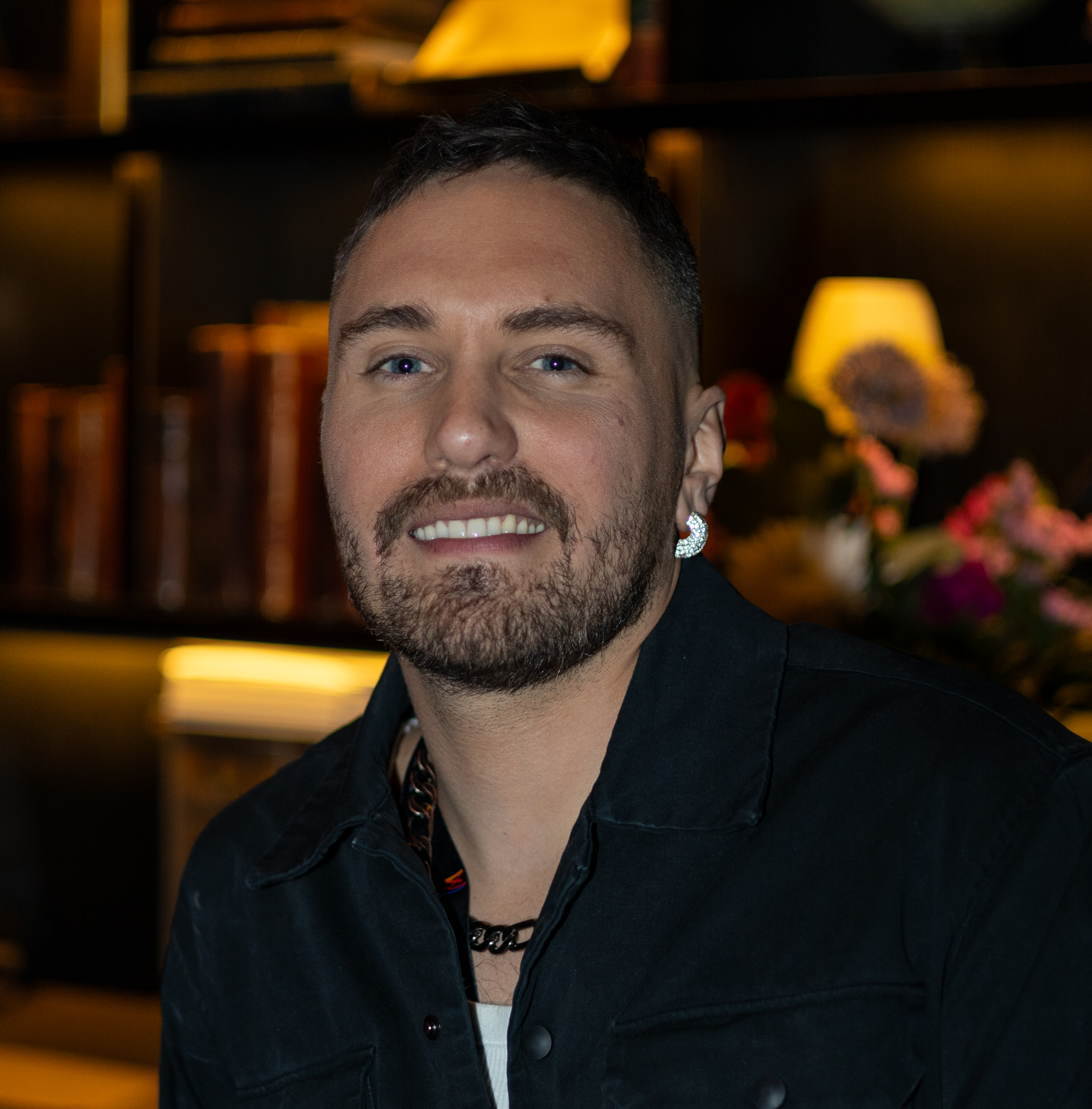
- Jean in 2025

Background information
- Born: Jean Patrik Olsson; 3 May 1990 (age 36); Stockholm, Sweden
- Genres: Pop
- Occupations: Singer; songwriter; record producer
- Instrument: Vocals
- Years active: 2013–present
- Labels: Independent; 100 Songs; X5 Music

Jean Patrik Olsson (born 3 May 1990), known professionally as Patrik Jean, is a Swedish singer and songwriter. He has written and co-written songs for various artists, including the Mamas, Marcus & Martinus, and Felix Jaehn. Jean collaborates with fellow songwriters and producers Melanie Wehbe and Herman Gardarfve. He released his second extended play titled Consequence in November 2020.

Jean participated in Melodifestivalen 2021 with the song "Tears Run Dry", but he failed to qualify to the final, placing fifth in Heat 2. He returned to the competition in Melodifestivalen 2026 with the song "Dusk Till Dawn", where he placed fifth in Heat 3 and once again failed to qualified for the final.

== Television ==
On 1 April 2023, Jean was a special guest celebrity in the episode Dragodifestivalen of the Swedish-language reality television series Drag Race Sverige broadcast on SVT1 and SVT Play.

== Influences ==
Jean cited Whitney Houston, Sam Smith, Khalid, Frank Ocean, and Summer Walker as his influences.

== Personal life ==
Jean came out as gay. He is in a relationship with photographer and video director Magnus Ragnvid.

== Discography ==
=== Extended plays ===
Title	Details
L Is For	Released: 1 June 2018; Label: Independent; Format: Digital download, streaming
Consequence	Released: 6 November 2020; Label: Independent; Format: Digital download, streaming

=== Singles ===
Title	Year	Peak chart positions	Album
Title	Year	SWE	Album
"Feel Good"	2013	—	Non-album singles
"Cut and Run"	2013	—	Non-album singles
"Losing Sleep"	2016	—	Non-album singles
"Loved You Once"	2018	—	L Is For
"Let Me Know"	2018	—	L Is For
"Prosecco"	2019	—	Non-album singles
"För alltid"	2019	—	Non-album singles
"The Talk"	2020	—	Consequence
"24"	2020	—	Consequence
"Come Through"	2020	—	Consequence
"One Night / Lifetime"	2020	—	Consequence
"Tears Run Dry"	2021	59	Melodifestivalen 2021
"Gravitate"	2021	—	Non-album singles
"For You"	2022	—	Non-album singles
"Dusk Till Dawn"	2026	43	Non-album singles

== Production discography ==
Title	Year	Artist	Album	Co-written with
"Like A Riddle" (featuring Hearts & Colors & Adam Trigger)	2017	Felix Jaehn	I	Felix Jaehn, Adam Trigger, Aiko Rohd, Florent Hugel, Steven Bashir
"Cut the Cord" (vs. Hitimpulse)	2017	Felix Jaehn	I	Felix Jaehn, Aiko Rohd, Hitimpulse, Simone Porter
"Treading Water"	2017	Chris Kläfford	Treading Water	Herman Gardarfve, Melanie Wehbe
"Mad for It" (featuring Casso)	2017	TooManyLeftHands	—N/a	Anders Kanstrup, Cassandra Ströberg, John-Alexis Mendoza, Martin Nick Bosewetter
"Break My Habits"	2017	Topic	—N/a	Tobias Topic, Arno Krabman, Jona Selle
"Louder"	2017	Mariette	—N/a	Elias Näslin, Karl-Ola Kjellholm, Melanie Wehbe
"Low Life"	2018	Soleima	Bulldog	Elias Näslin, Emma Bertilsson, Sarah Mariegaard
"A Little Longer"	2018	Broiler	—N/a	Herman Gardarfve, Melanie Wehbe
"Sólo Contigo" (with Juan Magán and Lena)	2018	Topic	—N/a	Tobias Topic, Juan Magán, Lena Meyer-Landrut, Melanie Fontana, Nico Wellenbrink
"Invited"	2018	Marcus & Martinus	—N/a	Marcus Gunnarsen, Martinus Gunnarsen, Emanuel Abrahamsson, Isabelle Zikai, Tayla Parx
"Make Room"	2018	Melanie Wehbe	—N/a	Melanie Wehbe, Helmer Norrby
"Forget You"	2018	Melanie Wehbe	—N/a	Melanie Wehbe, Herman Gardarfve
"Bad Habit"	2018	Hanna Ferm	—N/a	Hanna Ferm, Melanie Wehbe, Herman Gardarfve
"Breaking Hearts"	2019	Benedict Cork	Letters to Strangers	Benedict Cork, Tom Wiklund
"Rain"	2019	Tusse	—N/a	Herman Gardarfve, Melanie Wehbe
"Can't Say No" (featuring PJZ)	2019	Alex Mattson	—N/a	David Björk, Aleksi Kaunisvesi
"Don't Speak"	2019	Chris Holsten	—N/a	Chris Holsten, Hayley Aitken, Johan Gustavsson, Stephan Gracia Slaeen
"Irony"	2019	Melanie Wehbe	—N/a	Melanie Wehbe, Helmer Norrby
"Amsterdam"	2020	Grace Davies	Friends with the Tragic	Grace Davies, Adam Argyle
"Let It Be"	2020	The Mamas	Tomorrow Is Waiting	Herman Gardarfve, Melanie Wehbe
"Runaway"	2020	Rahmania Astrini	Adolescent	Rahmania Astrini, Björn Djupström, Rian Hamzah
"Dig Deep"	2020	Nathan Hartono	—N/a	Nathan Hartono, Joy Deb, Tom Liljegren
"Forget It All"	2020	Kenny Duerlund	Dansk Melodi Grand Prix 2020	Henrik Tala, Mila Falls, Kenny Duerlund
"Don't Wait For Me"	2021	Hanin Dhiya	Jangan Sampai Pasrah	Hanin Dhiya, Joy Deb, Melanie Wehbe

=== Melodifestivalen entries ===
Year	Title	Artist	Co-written with	Place
2020	"Move"	The Mamas	Herman Gardarfve, Melanie Wehbe	1st
2021	"Tears Run Dry"	Patrik Jean	Herman Gardarfve, Melanie Wehbe	Non-qualified
2023	"All My Life (Where Have You Been)"	Wiktoria	Herman Gardarfve, Melanie Wehbe, Wiktoria Johansson	Non-qualified
2024	"Light"	Annika Wickihalder	Annika Wickihalder, Herman Gardarfve, Linnea Gawell	8th
2025	"Life Again"	Annika Wickihalder	Annika Wickihalder, Herman Gardarfve	8th
2025	"Yihaa"	Dolly Style	Caroline Aronsson, David Lindgren Zacharias, Herman Gardarfve, Melanie Wehbe, Mikaela Samuelsson	5th
2026	"Dusk Till Dawn"	Patrik Jean	David Lindgren Zacharias, Joy Deb, Melanie Wehbe	Non-qualified

=== Dansk Melodi Grand Prix entries (Denmark) ===
Year	Artist	Title	Co-written with	Result
2020	Kenny Duerlund	"Forget It All"	Henrik Tala, Mila Falls, Kenny Duerlund	Final

=== Maltese national final entries ===
Year	Artist	Title	Co-written with	Result
2024	Greta Tude	"Topic (Bla Bla)"	Antoine Farrugia, Cyprian Cassar, Matthew Mercieca	7th
2024	Lisa Gauci	"Breathe"	Cyprian Cassar, Emil Calleja Bayliss, Petra Zammit	5th
2025	Kelsy Attard	"Love Me Loud"	Dana Burkhard, Kelsy Attard, Matteo Depares	Non-qualified

=== Montesong entries (Montenegro) ===
Year	Artist	Title	Co-written with	Result
2026	Đurđa	"Dominos"	David Lindgren Zacharias, Eric Lehmann, Herman Gardarfve, Melanie Wehbe	9th

=== Melodi Grand Prix entries (Norway) ===
Year	Artist	Title	Co-written with	Result
2026	Silke	"Forevermore"	Audun Agnar Guldbrandsen, Hannah Theuma, Silje Montsko Blandkjenn	9th
