= Idol 2017 (Sweden) =

- Season 2017
- Hosted by: Pär Lernström; Gina Dirawi
- Judges: Kishti Tomita; Alexander Kronlund; Nikki Amini; Anders Bagge
- Winner: Christoffer Kläfford
- Runner-up: Hanna Ferm

Release
- Original network: TV4
- Original release: 21 August – 8 December 2017

Season chronology
- ← Previous; Season 2016 Next → Season 2018

Idol 2017 is the thirteenth season of the Swedish Idol series. This year, Anders Bagge returned as a judge after a two-year absence. Kishti Tomita returned as a judge as well, since her departure in 2007. Nikki Amini also returned as judge, having made her debut last season. Alexander Kronlund was the new judge. Pär Lernström returned as the host. Gina Dirawi joined as co-host. Daniel Redgert joined as the co-host for Idol Extra.

== Elimination chart ==
Stage:		Semi Finals						Finals										
Date:		18/9	19/9	20/9	21/9	22/9		29/9	6/10	13/10	20/10	27/10	3/11	10/11	17/11	24/11	1/12	8/12
Place	Competitor	Results																
1
1	Christoffer Kläfford																	Winner
2	Hanna Ferm																	Runner-up
3	Gabriel Cancela																Out.	
4	Jemima Hicintuka															Out.		
5	Kevin Klein		3:a			WC 2									Out.			
6	Noah Gerstenfeld				3:a	WC 1								Out.				
7	Joakim Jakobsson												Out.					
8	Erika Bitanji											Out.						
9	Magnus Schönberg				3:a	WC 4					Out.							
10	Olivia Åhs									Out.								
11	Kevin Olsson								Out.									
12	Frida Hörnquist			3:a		WC 3		Out.										
13	Victor Leksell						Out.											
Semi	Sebastian Dahlström				3:a	Out.												
Semi	Jack Stengel-Dahl				3:a	Out.												
Semi	Selina Flodgren Gustafsson			3:a		Out.												
Semi	Amanda Persson			3:a		Out.												
Semi	Melvin Larsson Silli		3:a			Out.												
Semi	Oliver Sääv		3:a			Out.												
Semi	Lizette Didriksson	3:a				Out.												
Semi	Daria Kustovskaya	3:a				Out.												
Semi	Paulina Nylander	3:a				Out.												

Legend
Top 12	Top 22	Bottom 2	Eliminated	Withdrew	Safe	Advanced to the top 13 from the revenge stage	Did not perform/No longer in the competition

=== Top 13 ===
Order	Contestant	Song	Result
1	Joakim Jakobsson	"Love Me Again"	Safe
2	Olivia Åhs	"Love on the Brain"	Safe
3	Victor Leksell	"Dum av dig"	Eliminated
4	Noah Gerstenfeld	"Supermarket Flowers"	Safe
5	Hanna Ferm	"Forever Young"	Safe
6	Kevin Olsson	"P.Y.T."	Safe
7	Kevin Klein	"Uncover"	Safe
8	Gabriel Cancela	"All I Ask"	Safe
9	Jemima Hicintuka	"Scared to Be Lonely"	Bottom two
10	Frida Hörnquist	"It Will Rain"	Safe
11	Christoffer Kläfford	"Radioactive"	Safe
12	Magnus Schönberg	"Shape of You"	Safe
13	Erika Bitanji	"Crazy in Love"	Safe

=== Top 12 – Fridayparty ===
Order	Contestant	Song	Result
1	Frida Hörnquist	"Only Girl (In the World)"	Eliminated
2	Gabriel Cancela	"I Wish"	Safe
3	Erika Bitanji	"Bang Bang"	Safe
4	Joakim Jakobsson	"Dancing on My Own"	Safe
5	Noah Gerstenfeld	"Classic"	Safe
6	Kevin Klein	"Castle on the Hill"	Safe
7	Olivia Åhs	"You Shook Me All Night Long"	Safe
8	Kevin Olsson	"Hold My Hand"	Safe
9	Hanna Ferm	"Symphony"	Safe
10	Christoffer Kläfford	"Don't You Worry Child"	Safe
11	Magnus Schönberg	"Blame It on the Boogie"	Bottom two
12	Jemima Hicintuka	"Ex's & Oh's"	Safe

=== Top 11 – This is me ===
Order	Contestant	Song	Result
1	Gabriel Cancela	"Just the Way You Are"	Bottom two
2	Kevin Klein	"Yesterday"	Safe
3	Jemima Hicintuka	"Blow Your Mind (Mwah)"	Safe
4	Magnus Schönberg	"Mercy"	Safe
5	Kevin Olsson	"Jealous"	Eliminated
6	Olivia Åhs	"The Power of Love"	Safe
7	Joakim Jakobsson	"Rude"	Safe
8	Christoffer Kläfford	"Take Me to Church"	Safe
9	Erika Bitanji	"Titanium"	Safe
10	Noah Gerstenfeld	"2U"	Safe
11	Hanna Ferm	"Bleeding Love"	Safe

=== Top 10 – Love ===
Order	Contestant	Song	Result
1	Olivia Åhs	"Water Under the Bridge"	Eliminated
2	Magnus Schönberg	"When You Love Someone"	Safe
3	Hanna Ferm	"Beautiful"	Safe
4	Joakim Jakobsson	"Det brinner i bröstet"	Safe
5	Erika Bitanji	"Halo"	Safe
6	Gabriel Cancela	"How Am I Supposed to Live Without You"	Safe
7	Noah Gerstenfeld	"Stitches"	Bottom two
8	Jemima Hicintuka	"Stay with Me"	Safe
9	Christoffer Kläfford	"Utan dina andetag"	Safe
10	Kevin Klein	"What About Us"	Safe

=== Top 9 – Hits in Swedish ===
Order	Contestant	Song	Result
1	Noah Gerstenfeld	"Fan va bra"	Bottom two
2	Joakim Jakobsson	"Valborg"	Safe
3	Jemima Hicintuka	"Jag kommer"	Safe
4	Gabriel Cancela	"Snacket på stan"	Safe
5	Kevin Klein	"Öppna din dörr"	Safe
6	Hanna Ferm	"Allt jag behöver"	Safe
7	Magnus Schönberg	"Ramlar"	Eliminated
8	Christoffer Kläfford	"Somliga går i trasiga skor"	Safe
9	Erika Bitanji	"Rygg mot rygg"	Safe

=== Top 8 – Duets ===
The contestant marked in pink was eliminated, the contestant marked in lightblue was in the bottom two.

Order	Contestant 1	Contestant 2	Song	Result
1	Hanna Ferm	Noah Gerstenfeld	"True Colors"	N/A
2	Chris Kläfford	Kevin Klein	"Where the Streets Have No Name"	N/A
3	Jemima Hicintuka	Joakim Jakobsson	"Never Forget You"	N/A
4	Erika Bitanji	Gabriel Cancela	"No Air"	N/A

=== Top 7 – Classic Hits ===
Order	Contestant	Song	Result
1	Joakim Jakobsson	"It's Not Unusual"	Eliminated
2	Noah Gerstenfeld	"Suspicious Minds"	Safe
3	Hanna Ferm	"River Deep – Mountain High"	Safe
4	Kevin Klein	"When a Man Loves a Woman"	Bottom two
5	Gabriel Cancela	"A Change Is Gonna Come"	Safe
6	Jemima Hicintuka	"Fever"	Safe
7	Christoffer Kläfford	"Fly Me to the Moon"	Safe

=== Top 6 – Parent's Choice ===
Order	Contestant	Song	Result
1	Gabriel Cancela	"La copa de la vida"	Bottom two
2	Jemima Hicintuka	"Is This Love"	Safe
3	Hanna Ferm	"Stop"	Safe
4	Christoffer Kläfford	"Resolution"	Safe
5	Noah Gerstenfeld	"When You're Looking Like That"	Eliminated
6	Kevin Klein	"You Raise Me Up"	Safe

=== Top 5 – Superstars ===
Order	Act	First song	Order	Second song	Result
1	Christoffer Kläfford	"Without You"	6	"I Don't Want to Miss a Thing"	Safe
2	Kevin Klein	"Love Me Like You Do"	7	"I Want It That Way"	Eliminated
3	Hanna Ferm	"Born This Way"	8	"I Wanna Dance with Somebody"	Safe
4	Gabriel Cancela	"Locked Out of Heaven"	9	"Freedom! '90"	Bottom two
5	Jemima Hicintuka	"Lush Life"	10	"What's Love Got to Do With It"	Safe

=== Top 4 – Listens & duets together with previous Idols contestants ===
Order	Act	First song	Order	Second song	Result
1	Hanna Ferm	"Crazy"	5	"Love Me Harder" (With Liam Cacatian Thomassen)	Bottom two
2	Gabriel Cancela	"Beat It"	6	"Dusk Till Dawn" (With Lisa Ajax)	Safe
3	Jemima Hicintuka	"New Rules"	7	"Kiss" (With Robin Bengtsson)	Eliminated
4	Christoffer Kläfford	"Sex on Fire"	8	"Strövtåg i hembygden" (With Linnea Henriksson)	Safe

=== Top 3 – Semifinal: Jurys Choice ===
Order	Act	First song	Order	Second song	Result
1	Gabriel Cancela	"SexyBack"	4	"Sexual Healing"	Eliminated
2	Christoffer Kläfford	"Hotline Bling"	5	"Heaven"	Safe
3	Hanna Ferm	"Into You"	6	"Firework"	Safe

=== Top 2 – Final: Contestants Choice Viewers Choice Winners Single ===
Order	Act	First song	Order	Second song	Order	Third song	Result
1	Christoffer Kläfford	"I Will Wait"	3	"Imagine"	5	"Treading Water"	Winner
2	Hanna Ferm	"Stronger"	4	"Crazy"	6	"Treading Water"	Runner-up
