= Treading Water =

Treading water is a pattern of movement for a swimmer in water.

Treading Water may refer to:

- Treading Water (2001 film), a 2001 lesbian-themed American film
- Treading Water (2013 film), a 2013 Canadian-Mexican comedy-drama film
- Treadin' Water, a 1984 album by Earl Thomas Conley
- "Treading Water" (Alex Clare song), a 2011 song
- "Treading Water" (Christoffer Kläfford song), a 2017 song
- "Treading Water", a 2020 song by the Vamps from their album Cherry Blossom
- "Treading Water", a 2025 song by MGK from his album Lost Americana
