= Hanna Ferm =

Swedish singer

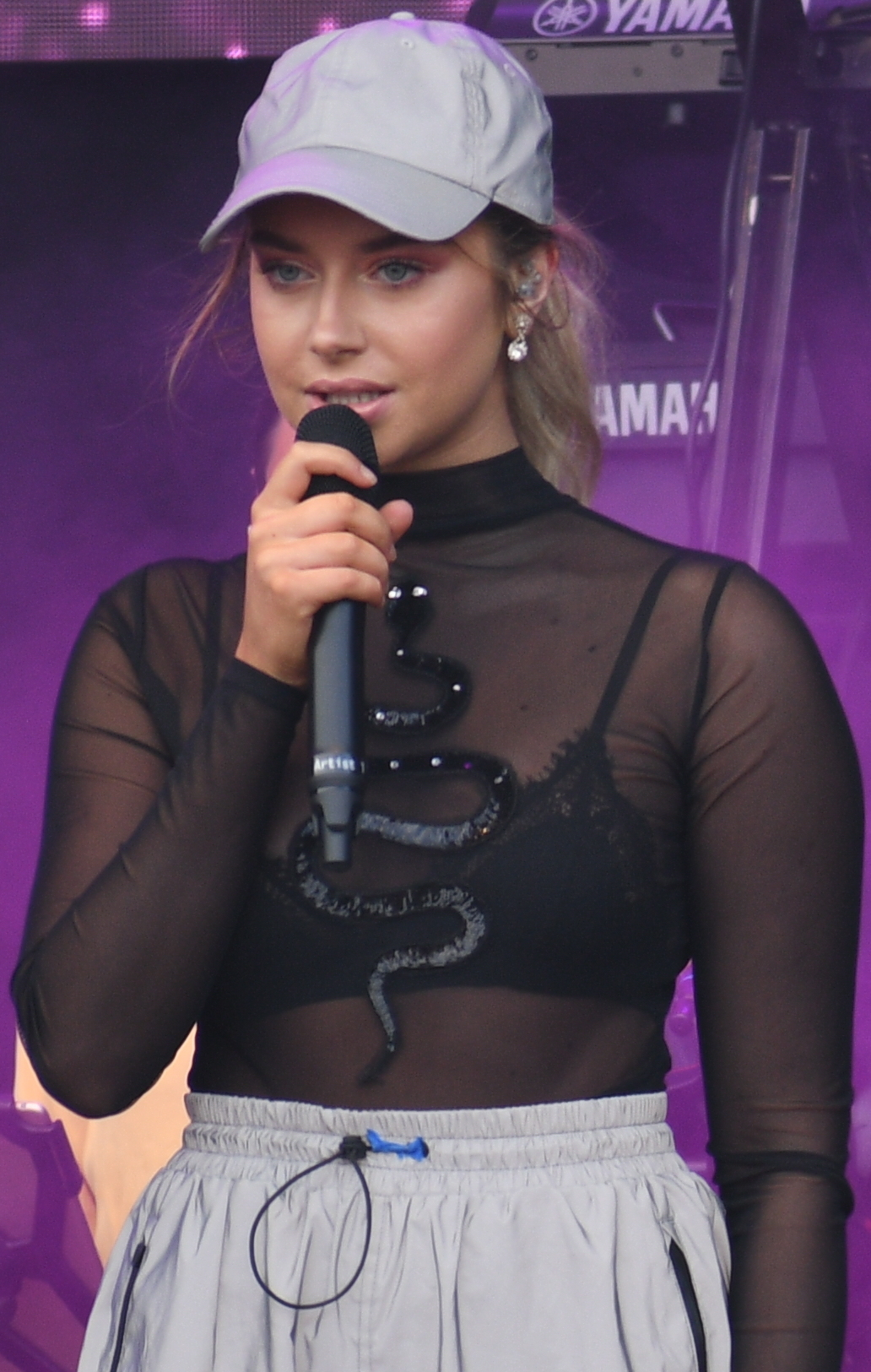
- Ferm at the Gothenburg Rix FM Festival in 2019

Background information
- Born: Hanna Alma Beata Ferm; 23 October 2000 (age 25); Pixbo, Sweden
- Genres: Pop
- Occupation: Singer
- Instrument: Vocals
- Years active: 2014–present
- Label: Universal Music
- Website: hannaferm.se

Hanna Alma Beata Ferm (born 23 October 2000) is a Swedish singer. She competed in Idol 2017, where she placed second.

== Career ==
Ferm participated in the TV4 talent show Talang Sverige 2014, which was broadcast on TV3. She made it to the second semi-final of the competition. Three years later, she participated in Idol 2017 where she made it to the final held at Globen Arena. She ended up in second place, behind Chris Kläfford.

On 2 February 2018, Ferm released her first single called "Never Mine" after signing a record deal with Universal Music. It was written and produced by Jimmy Jansson, Isak Alveus Bornebusch, and ISELIN. In July, she released her second single called "Bad Habit", which was written and produced by Herman Gardarfve, Patrik Jean, Melanie Wehbe, and Hanna herself.

On 16 November 2018, Ferm returned as a guest performer to Idol 2018 on TV4 to duet with contestant Bragi Bergsson.

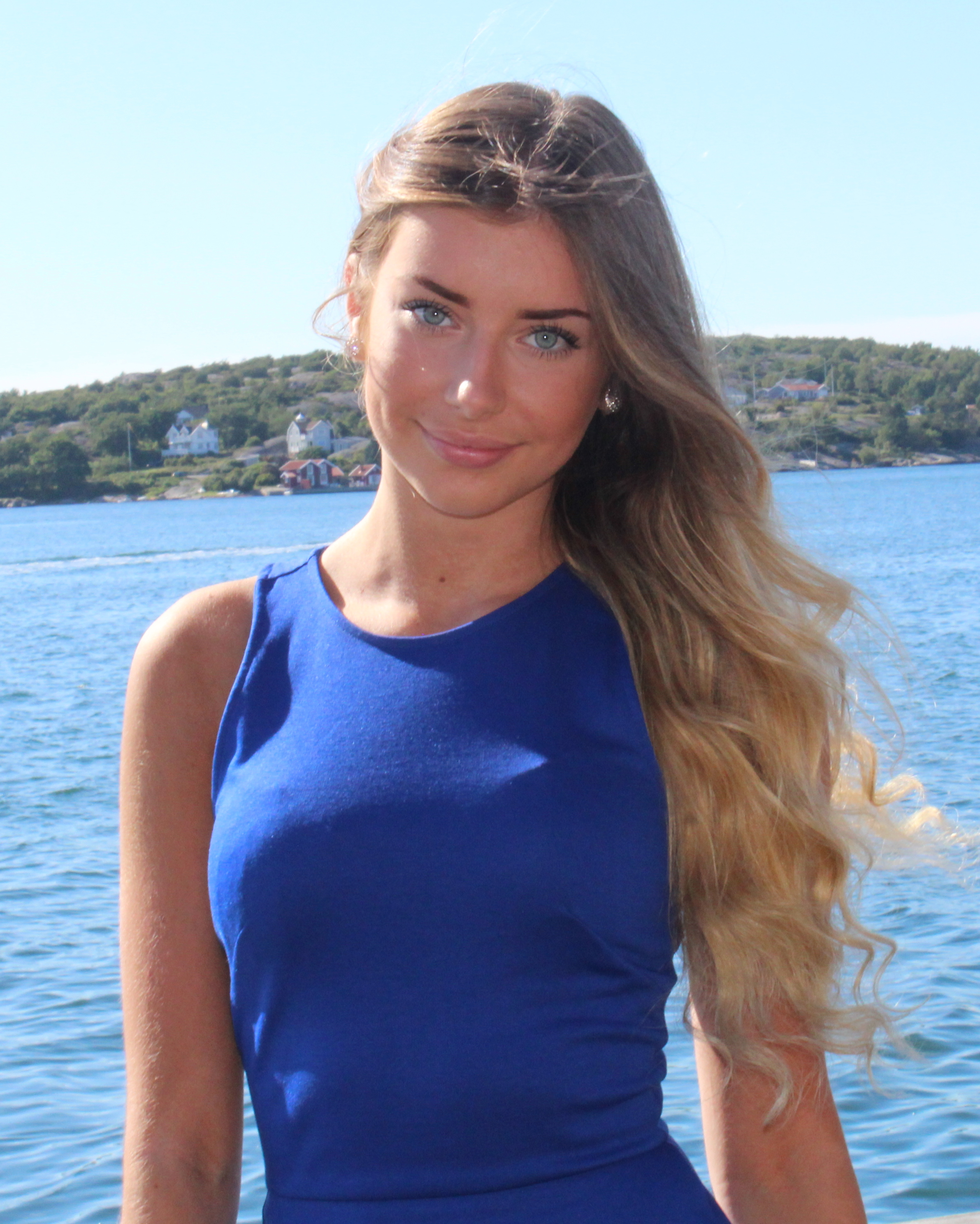
Ferm in 2018

Ferm participated in Melodifestivalen 2019 in a duet with LIAMOO with the song "Hold You". They had sung together while Hanna was in Idol 2017. LIAMOO had won the competition the year before. On 9 February 2019, in semi-final 2 of the competition, they qualified for the final, where they finished in 3rd place. Outta Breath, which was released as a single in October 2019, was written and produced by Jakob Redtzer, Sorana, William Jerner, and Hanna.

Hanna Ferm competed as a solo singer in Melodifestivalen 2020 with the song "Brave". She performed in the fourth semi-final at the Malmö Arena in Malmö on 22 February 2020 and went directly to the final, hosted at Friends Arena in Solna on 7 March 2020. She ended up in fourth place (out of 12 finalists in total), scoring a total of 94 points. She received a higher score by the television votes (third-most votes) than by the international jury (ninth-most points).

The single "Sweet Temptation" was released on 12 June 2020. It was written and produced by Dotter, Dino Medanhodzic, and Hanna. It was accompanied by her first music video as a professional artist.

== Discography ==
=== Singles ===
Title	Year	Peak chart positions	Certifications	Album
Title	Year	SWE	Certifications	Album
"Never Mine"	2018	— (Note: "Never Mine" did not enter the Swedish Singles Chart, but peaked at number five on the Swedish Heatseeker chart.)		Non-album singles
"Bad Habit"	2018	—		Non-album singles
"Hold You" (with Liamoo)	2019	2		Non-album singles
"Torn"	2019	—		Non-album singles
"Outta Breath"	2019	—		Non-album singles
"Brave"	2020	5		Non-album singles
"Sweet Temptation"	2020	—		Non-album singles
"I Met Somebody" (with John de Sohn)	2021	—		Lovers for the Weekend
"För evigt"	2021	9	GLF: 2× Platinum	Non-album singles
"Satisfaction" (with B.Baby and Yei Gonzalez)	2021	— (Note: "Satisfaction" did not enter the Swedish Singles Chart, but peaked at number two on the Swedish Heatseeker chart.)		Non-album singles
"Aldrig nånsin"	2021	— (Note: "Aldrig nånsin" did not enter the Swedish Singles Chart, but peaked at number five on the Swedish Heatseeker chart.)		Non-album singles
"Flyg fula fluga flyg"	2021	32		Non-album singles
"Håller in håller ut"	2022	66		Non-album singles
"Välkommen åter" (with Junie)	2022	34		Non-album singles
"Det är slut"	2022	33		Non-album singles
"Vet hon om?"	2023	21		Non-album singles
"Det är jag inte du"	2023	44		Non-album singles
"Undantag"	2023	87		Non-album singles
"Kommer aldrig förlora" (with Olivia Lobato)	2023	52		Non-album singles
"Valborg"	2023	10		Non-album singles
"Mellanrum"	2024	— (Note: "Mellanrum" did not enter the Swedish Singellista Chart, but peaked at number eight on the Swedish Heatseeker Chart.)		Non-album singles
"Han e done"	2024	— (Note: "Han e done" did not enter the Swedish Singellista Chart, but peaked at number nine on the Swedish Heatseeker Chart.)		Non-album singles
"Ett minne i taget"	2025	72		Non-album singles
"360" (with Romanos and Greekazo)	2026	99		Non-album singles
"—" denotes items which were not released in that country or failed to chart.
