= Sebastian Walldén =

Swedish singer

- Born: Johan Sebastian Walldén; 5 February 1995 (age 31); Gothenburg, Sweden
- Genres: Pop
- Instrument: Vocals
- Label: Universal Music Group

Johan Sebastian Walldén (born 5 February 1995) is a Swedish singer and winner of Idol 2018.

He competed in the final against Kadiatou Holm Keita in Globen on 7 December that year. He has earlier participated as a contestant on Paradise Hotel: Förspelet, broadcast on TV3, where he competed for a place as a contestants on the Swedish version of Paradise Hotel, but he did not win a spot.

Walldén is gay.

== Singles ==
Title	Year	Peak chart positions	Album
Title	Year	SWE	Album
"Everything"	2018	21	Non-album singles
"Bad News"	2019	—	Non-album singles
"Summer Love"	2019	—	Non-album singles
"—" denotes a release that did not chart or was not released in that territory.
