= Brave (Hanna Ferm song) =

Single by Hanna Ferm
- Released: 22 February 2020
- Length: 2:53
- Label: Universal
- Songwriter(s): David Kjellstrand; Jimmy Jansson; Laurell Barker

Hanna Ferm singles chronology
"Outta Breath" (2019)	"Brave" (2020)	"Sweet Temptation" (2020)

"Brave" is a song by Swedish singer Hanna Ferm. The song was performed for the first time in Melodifestivalen 2020, where it made it to the final, eventually placing 4th with 94 points. "Brave" peaked at number 5 on the Swedish single chart.

== Charts ==
Chart (2020)	Peak position
Sweden (Sverigetopplistan)	5
