= Molnljus =

Single by William Stridh

from the EP Faller
- Released: February 22, 2020
- Genre: Pop
- Length: 3:07
- Label: Sony Music Sweden
- Songwriter(s): Christian Holmström; David Kreuger; Markus Lidén; William Stridh
- Producer(s): Christian Holmström; David Kreuger; Markus Lidén

"Molnljus" is a Swedish language song by singer William Stridh. It was first performed at Melodifestivalen 2020. The song was written by Christian Holmström, David Kreuger, Markus Lidén and Stridh himself, and produced by Holmström, Lidén and Kreuger. It peaked at number 50 on the Swedish Singles Chart.

== Charts ==
Chart performance for "Molnljus"
Chart (2020)	Peak position
Sweden (Sverigetopplistan)	50

== Certifications ==
Certifications for "Molnljus"
Region	Certification	Certified units/sales
Sweden (GLF)	Gold	4,000,000^{†}
^{†} Streaming-only figures based on certification alone.
