= William Stridh =

Swedish singer

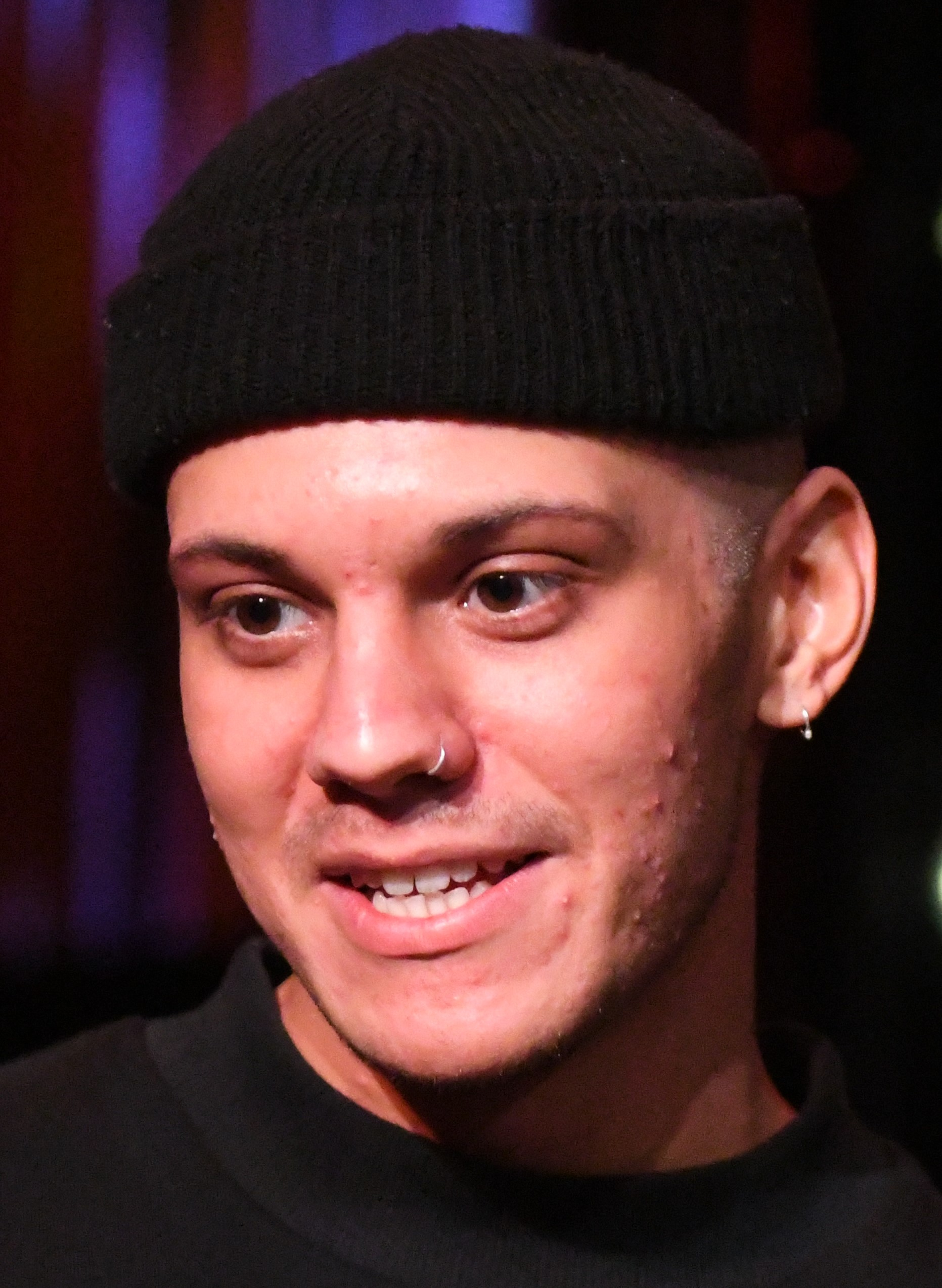
William Stridh in 2020

Björn Emilio "William" Stridh (born 16 August 1997) is a Swedish singer. He competed in Idol 2018 and finished fifth. He participated in Melodifestivalen 2020 with the song "Molnljus", in the fourth semifinal in Malmö he placed fifth. His debut EP, Faller, was released on 14 May 2021 via Sony Music.

== Discography ==
=== EPs ===
- Faller (2021)

=== Singles ===
Title	Year	Peak chart positions	Album
Title	Year	SWE	Album
"Molnljus"	2020	50	Faller
"Dårar"	2020	—	Faller
"Kommer du"	2020	—	Faller
"Bättre det än ingenting"	2020	—	Faller
