= Freddie Liljegren =

Swedish singer

Freddie Wilhelm Clemence Liljegren (born 19 May 1993) is a Swedish singer, who first came to widespread attention as a finalist in Swedish Idol 2019, broadcast on TV4, alongside Tusse Chiza, in which he was ultimately placed second.

Liljegren was born in Örebro. He has released two singles, both from his participation in Idol: a cover of "Uptown Funk" on 22 November 2019 as a Top 12 contestant and, as a finalist, his version of this season's winning song, "Rain", on 3 December 2019.

== Singles ==
Title	Year	Peak chart positions	Album
Title	Year	SWE	Album
"Uptown Funk"	2019	—	Non-album single
"Rain"	2019	—	Non-album single
