= Idol 2019 (Sweden) =

- Season 2019
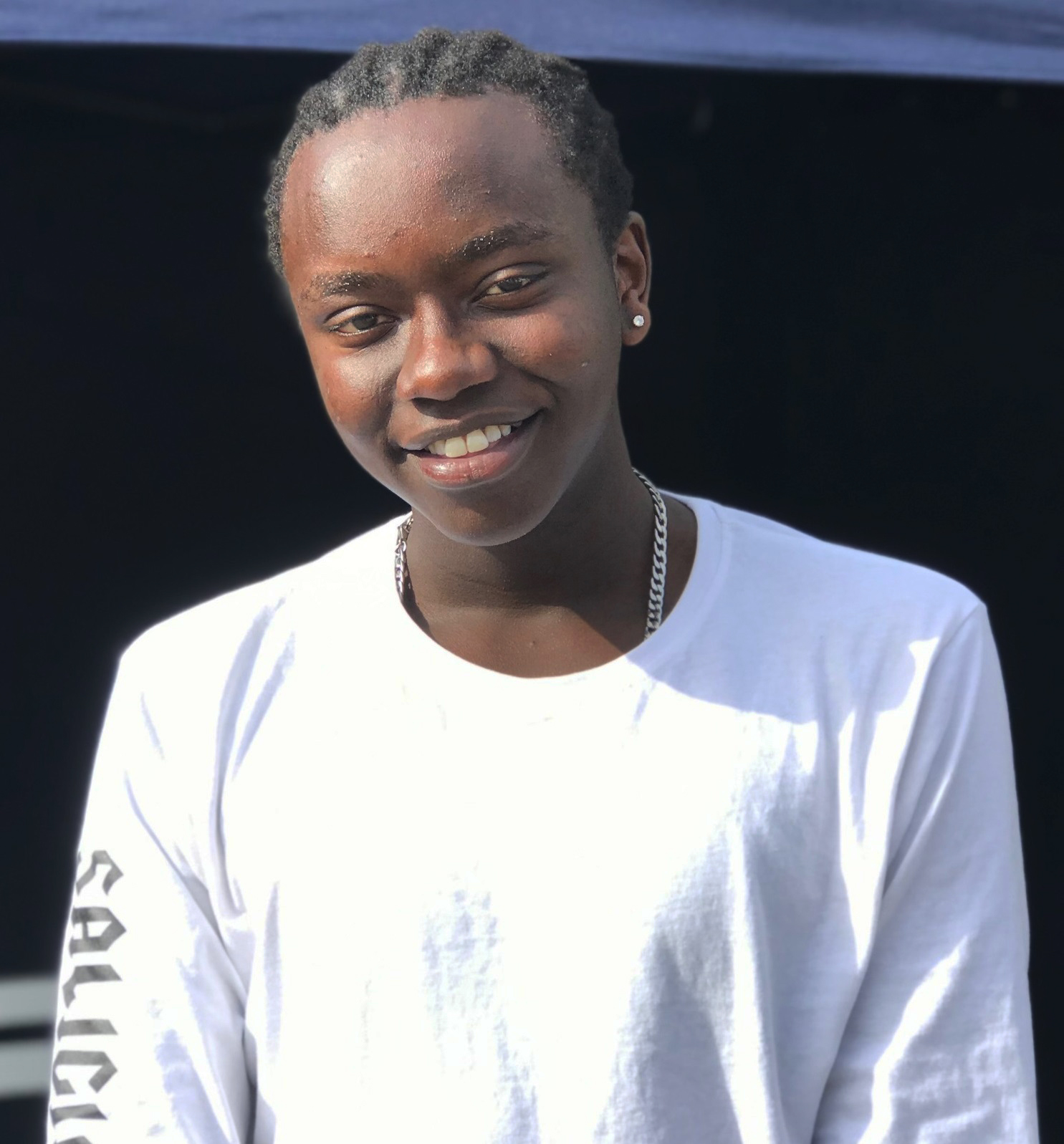
- Hosted by: Pär Lernström
- Judges: Kishti Tomita; Alexander Kronlund; Nikki Amini; Anders Bagge
- Winner: Tusse Chiza
- Runner-up: Freddie Liljegren
- Finals venue: Globen, Stockholm, Sweden

Release
- Original network: TV4
- Original release: 20 August – 6 December 2019

Season chronology
- ← Previous; Season 2018 Next → Season 2020

Idol 2019 was the fifteenth season of the Swedish Idol series.

== New season ==
It was confirmed on the 30 November 2018 semifinal of Idol 2018, that the series would return again on TV4.

== Top 20 ==
- Aida Secka, 24, Gothenburg

Annie Moreau 21, Jönköping

- Astrid Risberg, 20, Örebro
- Christoffer Hamberg, 29, Tibro
- Dao Di Ponziano, 17, Stockholm
- Eden Alm, 19, Hässleholm
- Filippa Johansson, 17, Alingsås
- Freddie Liljegren, 26, Örebro
- Gottfrid Krantz, 24, Härnösand
- Hampus Israelsson, 21, Falun
- Hugo Burlin Nyström, 18, Vaxholm
- Iana Kovalova, 26, Kyiv
- Kim Lilja, 25, Luleå
- Ludwig Hahn, 30, Västerås
- Madelief Termaten, 17, Ängelholm
- Malik Miller Sene, 23, Lund
- Matilda Gramenius, 16, Lidingö
- Nathalie Ulinder Cuti, 23, Gothenburg
- Pawel Piotr Pospiech, 31, Malmö
- Tusse Chiza, 17, Leksand (Tällberg)

== New to this season ==
Something new to this season in the weekly finals was that the jury could use a lifeline that meant they could save an act who'd been eliminated from the competition a particular week, but they could only use this once and only during the first seven weeks. In the end, the jury did not enact the lifeline.

== Elimination chart ==
Stadium:		Semi Finals						Finals										
Date:		16/9	17/9	18/9	29/9	20/9		27/9	4/10	11/10	18/10	25/10	1/11	8/11	15/11	22/11	29/11	6/12
Place	Contestant	Result																
1	Tusse Chiza																	Winner
2	Freddie Liljegren			3rd		WC 4												Runner-up
3	Dao Di Ponziano		3rd			WC 6											Out.	
4	Gottfrid Krantz															Out.		
5	Astrid Risberg														Out.			
6	Kim Lilja	3rd				WC 1								Out.				
7	Christoffer Hamberg												Out.					
8	Madelief Termaten											Out.						
9	Nathalie Ulinder Cuti				3rd	WC 5					Out.							
10	Ellie Lilja									Out.								
11	Hampus Israelsson	3rd				WC 2			Out.									
12	Aida Secka				3rd	WC 3		Out.										
13-14	Matilda Gramenius						Out.											
13-14	Pawel Piotr Pospiech						Out.											
Semi	Eden Alm				3rd	Out.												
Semi	Iana Kovalova				3rd	Out.												
Semi	Ludwig Hahn			3rd		Out.												
Semi	Hugo Burlin Nyström			3rd		Out.												
Semi	Filippa Johansson		3rd			Out.												
Semi	Annie Moreau		3rd			Out.												
Semi	Malik Miller Sene	3rd				Out.												

Legend
Top 21	Top 12	Bottom 2 or 3	Eliminated	Judges' save	Withdrew	Safe	Did not perform/Still participating/No longer in the competition

=== Top 14 ===
Order	Contestant	Song	Result
1	Gottfrid Krantz	"Take It Easy"	Safe
2	Matilda Gramenius	"Bust Your Windows"	Eliminated
3	Kim Lilja	"Are You Gonna Be My Girl"	Safe
4	Madelief Termaten	"Runaway Baby"	Safe
5	Hampus Israelsson	"Mercy"	Bottom three
6	Ellie Lilja	"Radioactive"	Safe
7	Christoffer Hamberg	"Brother"	Safe
8	Aida Secka	"No One"	Safe
9	Astrid Risberg	"Supremacy"	Safe
10	Tusse Chiza	"Happy"	Safe
11	Freddie Liljegren	"Hello"	Safe
12	Pawel Piotr Pospiech	"Roads"	Eliminated
13	Nathalie Ulinder Cuti	"Hometown Glory"	Safe
14	Dao Di Ponziano	"Creep"	Safe

=== Top 12 - I'm an Idol ===
Order	Contestant	Song	Result
1	Tusse Chiza	"I Got You (I Feel Good)"	Safe
2	Nathalie Ulinder Cuti	"Pumped Up Kicks"	Bottom three
3	Ellie Lilja	"I Still Haven't Found What I'm Looking For"	Safe
4	Aida Secka	"Pretty Hurts"	Eliminated
5	Dao Di Ponziano	"Valerie"	Safe
6	Freddie Liljegren	"Uptown Funk"	Safe
7	Astrid Risberg	"I Hate Myself for Loving You"	Safe
8	Christoffer Hamberg	"I'm Still Standing"	Safe
9	Hampus Israelsson	"Without You"	Bottom two
10	Kim Lilja	"Seven Nation Army"	Safe
11	Madelief Termaten	"Something's Got a Hold on Me"	Safe
12	Gottfrid Krantz	"Crazy Little Thing Called Love"	Safe

=== Top 11 - Breakthrough Hits ===
Order	Contestant	Song	Result
1	Christoffer Hamberg	"Känn ingen sorg för mig Göteborg"	Safe
2	Astrid Risberg	"Release Me"	Bottom three
3	Freddie Liljegren	"Hurtful"	Bottom two
4	Nathalie Ulinder Cuti	"Emmylou"	Safe
5	Gottfrid Krantz	"Umbrella"	Safe
6	Ellie Lilja	"Someone You Loved"	Safe
7	Madelief Termaten	"California Dreamin'"	Safe
8	Hampus Israelsson	"Tappat"	Eliminated
9	Kim Lilja	"My Hero"	Safe
10	Dao Di Ponziano	"When a Man Loves a Woman"	Safe
11	Tusse Chiza	"How Will I Know"	Safe

=== Top 10 - Worlds Best Songs ===
Order	Contestant	Song	Result
1	Kim Lilja	"Are You Gonna Go My Way"	Bottom two
2	Nathalie Ulinder Cuti	"Some Die Young"	Safe
3	Gottfrid Krantz	"Jailhouse Rock"	Safe
4	Dao Di Ponziano	"Sand"	Safe
5	Tusse Chiza	"You Shook Me All Night Long"	Safe
6	Christoffer Hamberg	"Älska mej"	Safe
7	Freddie Liljegren	"Superstition"	Safe
8	Ellie Lilja	"Chandelier"	Eliminated
9	Madelief Termaten	"Break Free"	Safe
10	Astrid Risberg	"Life on Mars?"	Safe

=== Top 9 - Melodifestivalen/Eurovision Song Contest ===
Order	Contestant	Song	Result
1	Gottfrid Krantz	"Michelangelo"	Safe
2	Dao Di Ponziano	"Tonight Again"	Bottom two
3	Kim Lilja	"Se på mig"	Safe
4	Christoffer Hamberg	"Det börjar verka kärlek, banne mej"	Safe
5	Madelief Termaten	"Ashes to Ashes"	Safe
6	Tusse Chiza	"Rise Like a Phoenix"	Safe
7	Astrid Risberg	"Statements"	Safe
8	Nathalie Ulinder Cuti	"Keep On Walking"	Eliminated
9	Freddie Liljegren	"Too Late for Love"	Safe

=== Top 8 - Thanks for all, England ===
Order	Contestant	Song	Result
1	Freddie Liljegren	"Mamma Knows Best"	Bottom two
2	Tusse Chiza	"What Makes You Beautiful"	Safe
3	Christoffer Hamberg	"Faith"	Safe
4	Astrid Risberg	"Hide and Seek"	Safe
5	Gottfrid Krantz	"Angels"	Safe
6	Madelief Termaten	"Pack Up"	Eliminated
7	Kim Lilja	"Roxanne"	Safe
8	Dao Di Ponziano	"Fix You"	Safe

=== Top 7 - Team spirit ===
Order	Contestant	Song	Result
1	Christoffer Hamberg	"Animal"	Eliminated
2	Tusse Chiza	"Purple Rain"	Safe
3	Freddie Liljegren	"Hold Back The River"	Bottom two
4	Dao Di Ponziano	"Rehab"	Safe
5	Kim Lilja	"Detroit Rock City"	Safe
6	Astrid Risberg	"At Last"	Safe
7	Gottfrid Krantz	"A Little Less Conversation"	Safe

=== Top 6 - Celebrity duets ===
Order	Contestant	Song	Artist	Celebrity	Result
1	Kim Lilja	"Living in America"	The Sounds	Maja Ivarsson	Eliminated
2	Freddie Liljegren	"My Personality"	Eric Gadd	Eric Gadd	Safe
3	Dao Di Ponziano	"Effortless"	Sabina Ddumba	Sabina Ddumba	Bottom two
4	Astrid Risberg	"The Weight Is Gone"	Albin Lee Meldau	Albin Lee Meldau	Safe
5	Gottfrid Krantz	"Genom allt"	Carola Häggkvist	Carola Häggkvist	Safe
6	Tusse Chiza	"Utan dig"	Molly Sandén	Molly Sandén	Safe

This week was the last chance for the jury to enact the lifeline.

=== Top 5 - National football teams' choices ===
Order	Contestant	Song	Artist	Result
1	Tusse Chiza	"Higher Love"	Steve Winwood	Bottom two
2	Gottfrid Krantz	"I'm In The Band"	The Hellacopters	Safe
3	Freddie Liljegren	"Always Remember Us This Way"	Lady Gaga	Safe
4	Astrid Risberg	"About You Now"	Sugababes	Eliminated
5	Dao Di Ponziano	"One and Only"	Adele	Safe

=== Top 4 - Love ===
Order	Contestant	Song 1 (the fans)	Artist 1	Song 2 (loved ones)	Artist 2	Result
1	Freddie Liljegren	"The Show Must Go On"	Queen	"Thinking Out Loud"	Ed Sheeran	Bottom two
2	Dao Di Ponziano	"Price Tag"	Jessie J	"I Have Nothing"	Whitney Houston	Safe
3	Tusse Chiza	"Classic"	MKTO	"Make You Feel My Love"	Adele	Safe
4	Gottfrid Krantz	"I Can Jive"	Jerry Williams	"I Don't Want to Miss a Thing"	Aerosmith	Eliminated

=== Top 3 - Jury's choices and previous song ===
Order	Contestant	Song 1 (challenge)	Artist 1	Song 2 (glory)	Artist 2	Song 3 (previous)	Artist 3	Result
1	Dao Di Ponziano	"Ain't My Fault"	Zara Larsson	"Love Me Like You Do"	Ellie Goulding	"Creep"	Vincint Cannady	Eliminated
2	Freddie Liljegren	"Astrologen"	Darin	"Viva la Vida"	Coldplay	"Isn't She Lovely"	Stevie Wonder	Safe
3	Tusse Chiza	"Ängeln i rummet"	Laleh	"I Want You Back"	The Jackson 5	"Human"	Rag'n'Bone Man	Safe

=== Top 2 - Final ===
Order	Contestant	Song 1 (own choice)	Artist 1	Song 2 (viewers' choice)	Artist 2	Song 3 (winning song)	Result
1	Freddie Liljegren	"Where The Streets Have No Name"	U2	"Uptown Funk"	Mark Ronson, Bruno Mars	"Rain"	Runner-up
2	Tusse Chiza	"There's Nothing Holdin' Me Back"	Shawn Mendes	"Rise Like a Phoenix"	Conchita Wurst	"Rain"	Winner
