= Idol 2018 (Sweden) =

- Season 2018
- Hosted by: Pär Lernström; Gina Dirawi
- Judges: Kishti Tomita; Alexander Kronlund; Nikki Amini; Anders Bagge
- Winner: Sebastian Walldén
- Runner-up: Kadiatou Holm Keita

Release
- Original network: TV4
- Original release: 20 August – 7 December 2018

Season chronology
- ← Previous; Season 2017 Next → Season 2019

Idol 2018 is the fourteenth season of reality-competition talent show Swedish Idol. Like the earlier seasons, this season was also broadcast on TV4. The hosts and the judges remained the same from the previous season. For the first time in the shows history there was a Top 13. Sebastian Walldén won the final.

== Elimination chart ==
Stadium:		Semi Finals						Finals										
Date:		17/9	18/9	19/9	20/9	21/9		28/9	5/10	12/10	19/10	26/10	2/11	9/11	16/11	23/11	30/11^{1}	7/12
Place	Contestant	Result																
1	Sebastian Walldén	3:a				WC 5												Winner
2	Kadiatou Holm Keita				3:a	WC 3												Runner-up
3-4	William Segerdahl																Out.	
3-4	Bragi Bergsson																Out.	
5	William Stridh															Out.		
6	Nathalie Brydolf														Out.			
7	Maximilian Bergstrand													Out.				
8	Tua Selge												Out.					
9	Ki Soe											Out.						
10	Matice Kamara			3:a		WC 2					Out.							
11	Vanja Engström				3:a	WC 4				Out.								
12	Ambér Flores		3:a			WC 1			Out.									
13	Nadia Cameron							Out.										
14	Ida Njie						Out.											
Semi	Ramila Moghaddam				3:a	Out.												
Semi	Adam Jarl			3:a		Out.												
Semi	Christofer Andersson			3:a		Out.												
Semi	Isak Sunding			3:a		Out.												
Semi	Alva Brodin		3:a			Out.												
Semi	Lisa Gustafsson		3:a			Out.												
Semi	Anton Kröll	3:a				Out.												
Semi	Gonzalo Flores	3:a				Out.												

Legend
Top 22	Top 13	Bottom 2	Eliminated	Withdrew	Safe	Advanced to the top 13 from the revenge stage	Did not perform/Still participating/No longer in the competition

^{1} On November 30 will 2 contestants leave the competition

=== Top 14 ===
Order	Contestant	Song	Result
1	Nadia Cameron	"No Tears Left to Cry"	Safe
2	William Strid	"Större"	Bottom two
3	Ki Soe	"I'm Not the Only One"	Safe
4	Ambér Flores	"Runnin' (Lose It All)"	Safe
5	William Segerdahl	"Klappar och slag"	Safe
6	Nathalie Brydolf	"Million Reasons"	Safe
7	Matice Kamara	"Ingen annan rör mig som du"	Safe
8	Ida Nije	"Not too Young"	Eliminated
9	Maximilian Bergstrand	"Like a Rolling Stone"	Safe
10	Tua Selge	"Brinner i bröstet"	Safe
11	Kadiatou Holm Keita	"Tidal Wave"	Safe
12	Bragi Bergsson	"Passport Home"	Safe
13	Vanja Engström	"You Give Love a Bad Name"	Safe
14	Sebastian Walldén	"Master Blaster (Jammin')"	Safe

=== Top 13 - Fridayparty ===
Order	Contestant	Song	Result
1	Matice Kamara	"God's Plan"	Safe
2	Sebastian Walldén	"Youngblood"	Safe
3	Nadia Cameron	"Came Here for Love"	Eliminated
4	Tua Selge	"Call Your Girlfriend"	Safe
5	Bragi Bergsson	"This Love"	Safe
6	William Strid	"Roads"	Safe
7	Ki Soe	"Remind Me to Forget"	Safe
8	Vanja Engström	"So What"	Bottom two
9	Nathalie Brydolf	"Cake by the Ocean"	Safe
10	Kadiatou Holm Keita	"Domino"	Safe
11	Maximilian Bergstrand	"I'm a Believer"	Safe
12	Ambér Flores	"When Love Takes Over"	Safe
13	William Segerdahl	"Love Me Again"	Safe

=== Top 12 - This is me ===
Order	Contestant	Song	Result
1	Nathalie Brydolf	"Something's Got a Hold on Me"	Safe
2	William Segerdahl	"Attention"	Safe
3	Tua Selge	"Sand"	Safe
4	Sebastian Walldén	"Promises"	Safe
5	Ki Soe	"September Song"	Bottom two
6	Maximilian Bergstrand	"My Generation"	Safe
7	William Strid	"How to Save a Life"	Safe
8	Ambér Flores	"If I Were a Boy"	Eliminated
9	Kadiatou Holm Keita	"Say Something"	Safe
10	Bragi Bergsson	"Way Down We Go"	Safe
11	Vanja Engström	"Born To Be Wild"	Safe
12	Matice Kamara	"Pari"	Safe

=== Top 11 - Divas ===
Order	Contestant	Song	Result
1	William Segerdahl	"If I Could Turn Back Time"	Safe
2	Matice Kamara	"Doo Wop (That Thing)"	Bottom two
3	Ki Soe	"Chained to the Rhythm"	Safe
4	Vanja Engström	"...Baby One More Time"	Eliminated
5	William Strid	"Wrecking Ball"	Safe
6	Kadiatou Holm Keita	"Umbrella"	Safe
7	Maximilian Bergstrand	"Don't Stop Me Now"	Safe
8	Sebastian Walldén	"Back to Black"	Safe
9	Tua Selge	"Rolling in the Deep"	Safe
10	Bragi Bergsson	"I Wanna Be Your Lover"	Safe
11	Nathalie Brydolf	"(You Make Me Feel Like) A Natural Woman"	Safe

=== Top 10 – Duets ===
The Contestant marked in pink was eliminated the contestant marked in lightblue was in the bottom two

Order	Contestant 1	Contestant 2	Song	Result
1	Sebastian Walldén	Bragi Bergsson	"Next to You"	N/A
2	Matice Kamara	Nathalie Brydolf	"Empire State of Mind"	N/A
3	Tua Selge	William Strid	"One"	N/A
4	Ki Soe	Maximilian Bergstrand	"Dancing in the Street"	N/A
5	Kadiatou Holm Keita	William Segerdahl	"For You"	N/A

=== Top 9 - Hits on Swedish ===
Order	Contestant	Song	Result
1	William Segerdahl	"Snacket på stan"	Bottom two
2	Sebastian Walldén	"Hos dig är jag underbar"	Safe
3	Kadiatou Holm Keita	"Ett sista glas"	Safe
4	Bragi Bergsson	"Astrologen"	Safe
5	Nathalie Brydolf	"Långsamt farväl"	Safe
6	Ki Soe	"Slå mig hårt i ansiktet"	Eliminated
7	Tua Selge	"Goliat"	Safe
8	William Strid	"Din tid kommer"	Safe
9	Maximilian Bergstrand	"Jag vill ha en egen måne"	Safe

=== Top 8 - Bigband ===
Order	Contestant	Song	Result
1	Tua Selge	"Fly Me to the Moon"	Eliminated
2	Maximilian Bergstrand	"Tutti Frutti"	Safe
3	Bragi Bergsson	"Beyond The Sea"	Bottom two
4	Sebastian Walldén	"New York, New York"	Safe
5	William Strid	"Hold On, I'm Comin'"	Safe
6	William Segerdahl	"Suspicious Minds"	Safe
7	Nathalie Brydolf	"Sakta vi gå genom stan"	Safe
8	Kadiatou Holm Keita	"Shake a Tail Feather"	Safe

=== Top 7 - Parent’s Choice ===
Order	Contestant	Song	Result
1	William Strid	"Öppna din dörr"	Bottom two
2	Maximilian Bergstrand	"You've Got to Hide Your Love Away"	Eliminated
3	Kadiatou Holm Keita	"Irreplaceable"	Safe
4	Sebastian Walldén	"Guldet blev till sand"	Safe
5	Nathalie Brydolf	"That Don't Impress Me Much"	Safe
6	William Segerdahl	"See You Again"	Safe
7	Bragi Bergsson	"Your Song"	Safe

=== Top 6 - Celebrity Duets ===
Order	Contestant	Celebrity	Song	Result
1	Kadiatou Holm Keita	Felix Sandman	"Hurt Somebody"	Safe
2	William Strid	Wiktoria	"Stay with Me"	Bottom two
3	Sebastian Walldén	Astrid S	"I'll Be There"	Safe
4	William Segerdahl	Mariette	"Shallow"	Safe
5	Bragi Bergsson	Hanna Ferm	"Up Where We Belong"	Safe
6	Nathalie Brydolf	Benjamin Ingrosso	"Sugar"	Eliminated

=== Top 5 – Swedish music exports and Love ===
Order	Act	First song	Order	Second song	Result
1	Sebastian Walldén	"Sun Is Shining"	6	"Love on the Brain"	Safe
2	Bragi Bergsson	"Save Tonight"	7	"All of Me"	Bottom two
3	William Strid	"Talking Body"	8	"Impossible"	Eliminated
4	Kadiatou Holm Keita	"Release Me"	9	"No One"	Safe
5	William Segerdahl	"Euphoria"	10	"Snälla bli min"	Safe

=== Top 4 – Semifinal: Judges Choice ===
Order	Act	First song	Order	Second song	Result
1	Bragi Bergsson	"Can't Feel My Face"	5	"Against All Odds (Take a Look at Me Now)"	Eliminated
2	William Segerdahl	"No Brainer"	6	"Say You Won't Let Go"	Eliminated
3	Kadiatou Holm Keita	"Make You Feel My Love"	7	"Diamonds"	Safe
4	Sebastian Walldén	"Uptown Funk"	8	"Careless Whisper"	Safe

In this semifinal will 2 acts leave the competition.

=== Top 2 – Final: Contestants Choice Viewers Choice Winners Single ===
Order	Act	Contestant's Choice Song	Order	Viewer's Choice Song	Order	Winner's Single	Result
1	Sebastian Walldén	"Back to Black"	3	"Without You"	5	"Everything"	Winner
2	Kadiatou Holm Keita	"Say Something"	4	"We Found Love"	6	"Everything"	Runner-Up

== Auditions ==
- 4 March 2018: Karlstad, Karlstad CCC
- 10 March 2018: Umeå, Väven
- 18 March 2018: Göteborg, Eriksbergshallen
- 24 March 2018: Helsingborg, Helsingborg Arena
- 14 April 2018: Stockholm, Tele2 Arena
