= Dao Molander Di Ponziano =

Swedish singer and actress

Dao Keela Antonia Molander Di Ponziano, also known as Dao Di Ponziano and Dao Di Ponziano Molander (born 6 October 2001) is a Swedish singer and actress.

She was born in Stockholm as the daughter of casting director Mari Molander and actor Antonio Di Ponziano, and the granddaughter of director Jan Molander.

She has acted in Swedish films such as Sune på bilsemester and the fourth LasseMajas detektivbyrå film Stella Nostra. Di Ponziano also appeared in 2 episodes of the TV series Hassel, which was broadcast on TV3 in 2017. She began 2018 as a contestant on the eighth season of Talang (Sweden's version of the Got Talent format) broadcast on TV4, where she performed the song "Fix You" and made it to the first semifinal, but didn't receive enough votes to progress to the final. The following year Dao Di Ponziano participated in another TV4 reality competition show, Idol 2019. On the 22 November that year, while still on the show and in the running to win, she released a cover of "Fix You" as her first single. One week later she was eliminated, ending up at third place.

== Singles ==
| Title | Year | Peak chart positions | Album |
| Title | Year | SWE | Album |
|---|---|---|---|
| "Fix You" | 2019 | | Non-album single |

== Filmography ==
- Sune på bilsemester (The Anderssons Hit the Road, 2013) – Nora/young Nicole
- LasseMajas detektivbyrå - Stella Nostra (JerryMaya's Detective Agency - Stella Nostra, 2015) – Focaccia Panini
- Hassel (TV series, 2017) – Madde (2 episodes)
