= Kadiatou Holm Keita =

Swedish singer

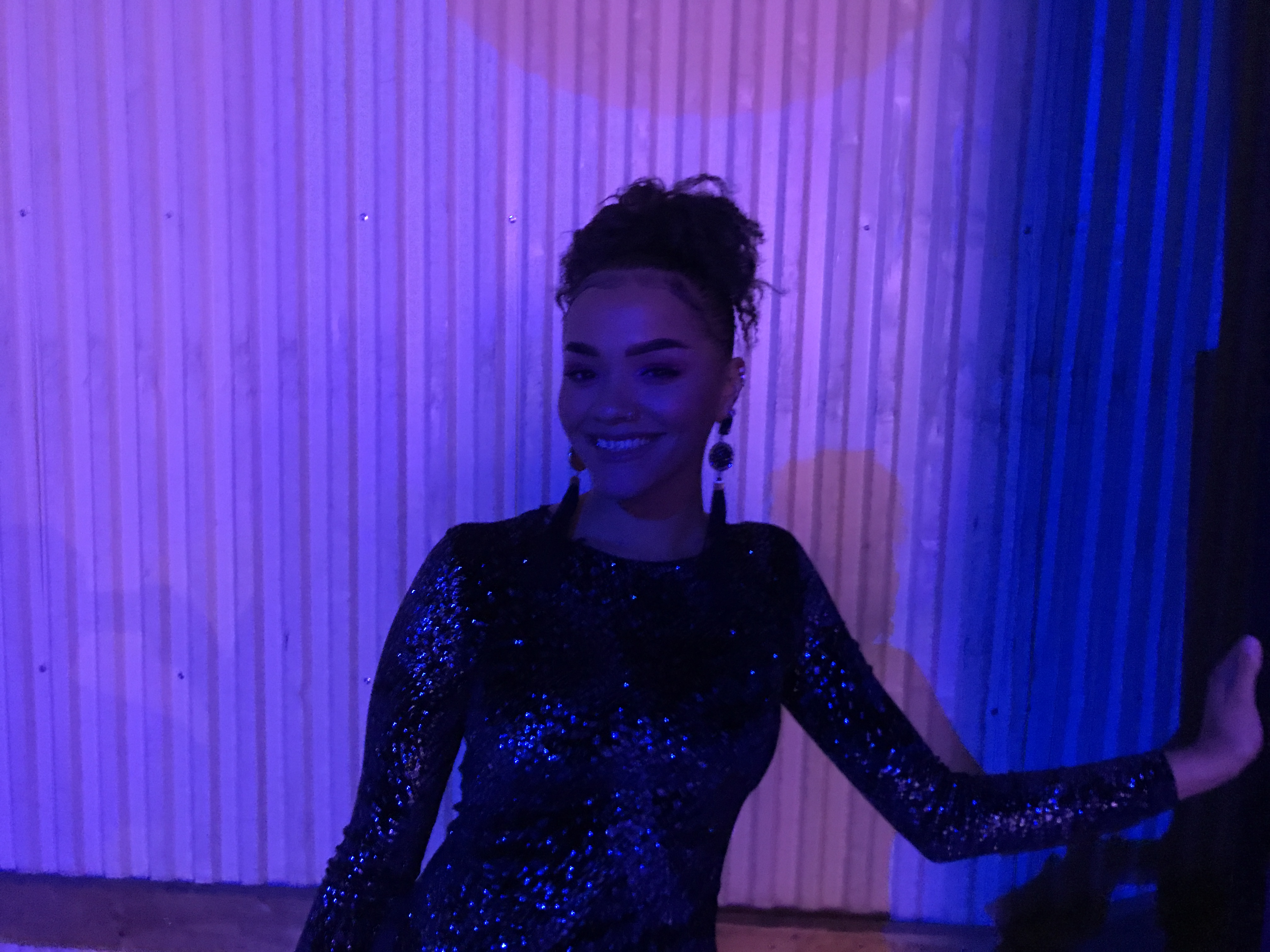
- Kadiatou in 2018

Background information
- Born: Kadiatou Claudine Holm Keita; 6 September 2001 (age 24); Stockholm, Sweden
- Genres: Soul, R&B
- Occupation: Singer
- Instrument: Vocals
- Years active: 2018–present

Kadiatou Claudine Holm Keita (born 6 September 2001) is a Swedish singer. She grew up in Lidingö.

She was one of the finalists in Idol 2018 which is broadcast on TV4. She competed against Sebastian Walldén in Globen on 7 December and placed second.

Kadiatou participated in Melodifestivalen 2021 with her song "One Touch", but failed to qualify for the final after placing sixth in the first semi-final.

== Singles ==
Title	Year	Peak chart positions	Album
Title	Year	SWE	Album
"Say Something"	2018	39	Non-album singles
"Lonely Sometimes"	2019	—	Non-album singles
"Legacy"	2020	—	Non-album singles
"Best I've Had"	2020	—	Non-album singles
"White Christmas"	2020	—	Non-album singles
"Christmas Night with You"	2020	—	Non-album singles
"One Touch"	2021	50	Non-album singles
"Don't Complicate It"	2021	—	Non-album singles
