= Play with Fire =

Play with Fire may refer to:

- Play with Fire (comics), a Buffy the Vampire Slayer comics collection
- "Play with Fire" (CSI), an episode of CSI: Crime Scene Investigation

== Music ==
- Play with Fire (album), by The Reign of Kindo, 2013
- "Play with Fire" (Hilary Duff song), 2006
- "Play with Fire" (Rolling Stones song), 1965
- "Play with Fire", a song by Kendrick Lamar from C4
- "Play with Fire", a song by Nico Santos

== See also ==
- Playing with Fire (disambiguation)
- The Girl Who Played with Fire (2006), the second novel in Stieg Larsson's Millennium series
