= Everything (Sebastian Walldén song) =

- Single cover

Single by Sebastian Walldén
- Released: 7 December 2018
- Recorded: 2018
- Genre: Pop
- Length: 3:14
- Label: Universal Music Group
- Songwriter(s): Lina Hansson; Cassandra Ströberg; Clara Mae; Kris Eriksson

"Everything" is the winner song of Idol 2018 performed by Swedish singer Sebastian Walldén. The winner of the final on 7 December 2018 would get to release the song as their debut single.

== Charts ==
Chart (2018–19)	Peak position
Sweden (Sverigetopplistan)	21
