= Playing with Fire (Liam Cacatian Thomassen song) =

Single by Liam Cacatian Thomassen
- Released: 10 December 2016
- Recorded: 2016
- Genre: Pop
- Length: 3:20
- Label: Universal Music Group
- Songwriter(s): Rasmus Hedegaard; Alexander Tidebrink; Calle Lehmann; Vigiland

Liam Cacatian Thomassen singles chronology
"Playing with Fire" (2016)	"Burn" (2017)

"Playing with Fire" is a song by Swedish singer Liam Cacatian Thomassen, winner of the Swedish version of Idol in its twelve season in 2016. The song was released as a digital download in Sweden on 10 December 2016 through Universal Music Group. The song is written by Rasmus Hedegaard, Alexander Tidebrink, Calle Lehmann and also the group Vigiland. The song has peaked at number 4 on the Swedish Singles Chart.

== Track listing ==
Digital download
No.	Title	Length
1.	"Playing with Fire"	3:20

== Chart performance ==
=== Weekly charts ===
Chart (2016)	Peak position
Sweden (Sverigetopplistan)	4

== Release history ==
Region	Date	Format	Label
Sweden	10 December 2016	Digital download	Universal Music Group
Sweden	10 December 2016	Streaming	Universal Music Group
