= Playing with Fire: Queer Politics, Queer Theories =

Collection of essays on queer politics

- Editor: Shane Phelan
- Authors: Judith Butler, Cynthia Burack, Stacey Young, Shane Phelan, Angelia R. Wilson, Anna Marie Smith, Gordon A. Babst, Gary Lehring, Morris B. Kaplan, Paisley Currah, Lisa Bower
- Series: Thinking Gender
- Subjects: Queer theory, politics, homosexuality, LGBT rights in the United States
- Published: 1997
- Publisher: Routledge
- Pages: 291
- ISBN: 0-415-91416-7
- OCLC: 33947336
- Dewey Decimal: 306.76/6

Playing with Fire: Queer Politics, Queer Theories is a collection of essays on queer theory and political theory from a queer perspective. It was edited by Shane Phelan and published by Routledge on January 14, 1997, making it one of the first scholarly collections by American political theorists to address the topic of queer politics.

At the time of publication, Feminist Bookstore News described the book as "filled with writings about queer law, politics, and policy", forecasting that it would "do well in university towns and perhaps moderately well with a general audience".

== Contents ==
- Critically Queer by Judith Butler
- True or False: The Self in Radical Lesbian Feminist Theory by Cynthia Burack
- Dichotomies and Displacement: Bisexuality in Queer Theory and Politics by Stacey Young
- Lesbians and Mestizas: Appropriation and Equivalence by Shane Phelan
- Somewhere Over the Rainbow: Queer Translating by Angelia R. Wilson
- The Centering of Right-Wing Extremism Through the Construction of an "Inclusionary" Homophobia and Racism by Anna Marie Smith
- Community, Rights Talk, and the Communitarian Dissent in Bowers v. Hardwick by Gordon A. Babst
- Essentialism and the Political Articulation of Identity by Gary Lehring
- Intimacy and Equality: The Question of Lesbian and Gay Marriage by Morris B. Kaplan
- Politics, Practices, Publics: Identity and Queer Rights by Paisley Currah
- Queer Problems/Straight Solutions: The Limits of a Politics of "Official Recognition" by Lisa Bower
