= Treading Water (Christoffer Kläfford song) =

Single by Christoffer Kläfford
- Released: 15 December 2017
- Recorded: 2017
- Genre: Pop rock
- Length: 2:59
- Label: Universal Music Group
- Songwriters: Herman Gardarfve; Patrik Jean; Melanie Wehbe
- Producer: Herman Gardarfve

Christoffer Kläfford singles chronology
"Treading Water" (2017)	"What Happened to Us" (2018)

"Treading Water" is a song by Swedish singer Christoffer Kläfford, winner of the Swedish version of Idol in its thirteenth season in 2017. The song was released as a digital download in Sweden on 15 December 2017 through Universal Music Group. It was released on Kläfford's EP with the same name. The song was subsequently certified platinum in Sweden.

== Track listing ==
Digital download
No.	Title	Length
1.	"Treading Water"	2:59

== Charts ==
Chart (2017)	Peak position	Certifications
Sweden (Sverigetopplistan)	3	GLF: Platinum

== Release history ==
Region	Date	Format	Label
Sweden	15 December 2017	Digital download	Universal Music Group
