= Playing with Fire (Weldon and Bjornstad book) =

Christian anti-role-playing-game book

- Author: John Weldon; James Bjornstad
- Language: English
- Publisher: Moody Press
- Publication date: 1984
- Pages: 91

Playing with Fire: Dungeons and Dragons, Tunnels and Trolls, Chivalry and Sorcery, and other Fantasy Games is a book written by John Weldon and James Bjornstad and published by Moody Press in 1984 that warns against playing role-playing games.

== Background ==
In the early 1980s, some religious groups accused TSR, the publisher of Dungeons & Dragons, of encouraging sorcery and the veneration of demons. This was exacerbated in 1982, when Patricia Pulling's son killed himself. Pulling blamed D&D for her son's suicide, and formed an organization named B.A.D.D. (Bothered About Dungeons & Dragons) to attack the game and the company that produced it. This culminated in a 1985 segment of 60 Minutes that featured interviews with both Pulling and D&D co-creator Gary Gygax.

== Description ==
In 1984, at the height of the "Satanic Panic", the Christian publisher Moody Press released Playing with Fire, a 91-page book by Christian apologists John Weldon and James Bjornstad. Their book tried to make the case that role-playing games are morally ambiguous and dangerous for young, impressionable minds, and inherently anti-Christian.

Playing with Fire was subsequently favorably quoted by other Christian publications including Demon Possession and the Christian (C. Fred Dickason, Crossway, 1989) and Encyclopedia of New Age Beliefs (John Ankerberg & John Weldon, Moody Publications, 1996). In How to Be a Christian without Being Perfect, Fritz Ridenour noted that, according to Weldon and Bjornstad, "the lack of a real moral compass viewpoint, plus obvious references to and promotions of the occult, make [fantasy role-playing] games highly dangerous." Even as late as 2010, a passage from Playing with Fire was quoted in The wisdom of Pixar : An Animated Look at Virtue.

== Reception ==
Valerie Garding for The Abbotsford News said that "The authors of 'Playing With Fire' discuss four areas of concern in FRP games; the role of fantasy, morality, escapism, and occultism. They examine the theology of the game, contrasting it to Christian theology. Some apparent FRP-related problems are discussed, including reported cases of suicides, murders, demon possession, overidentification with characters and inability to distinguish between fantasy and reality. Occult practises found in the games are revealed and explained."

In the May–June 1985 edition of The Space Gamer (No. 74), Steve LaPrade commented that "Like it or not, RPGers, parents are reading this book or hearing from those who have. It has been prominently displayed in religious bookstores and in some regular bookstores. If gamers want to see the shape of a threat to their hobby, this book is it. Because of its information value – plus a good bibliography of RPG newspaper and magazine articles – gamers may find it a worthwhile investment of their time and money, especially if RPGs are under attack in their home town."

In Issue 1978 of the Christian newspaper Calvinist Contact, Bert Hielema rejected the premise of the book, noting, "My first reaction ... was one of shoulder shrugging." Hielema believed the authors were overrreacting, writing, "So now, after bad books and bad television and bad videotapes, do we now have another source of evil invading society? Is playing D&D like playing with fire? As much as living in the 20th century is playing with fire." Hielema concluded that that game was not suitable for young Christians due to its violence, writing, "Can I recommend this book? With some reservation, yes. Not ever to play D&D but to be aware of its dangers and especially to stimulate the development of Christian Role Playing games based on biblical resources."

== Reviews ==
- Space Gamer #79
