= Liamoo =

Swedish singer (born 1997)

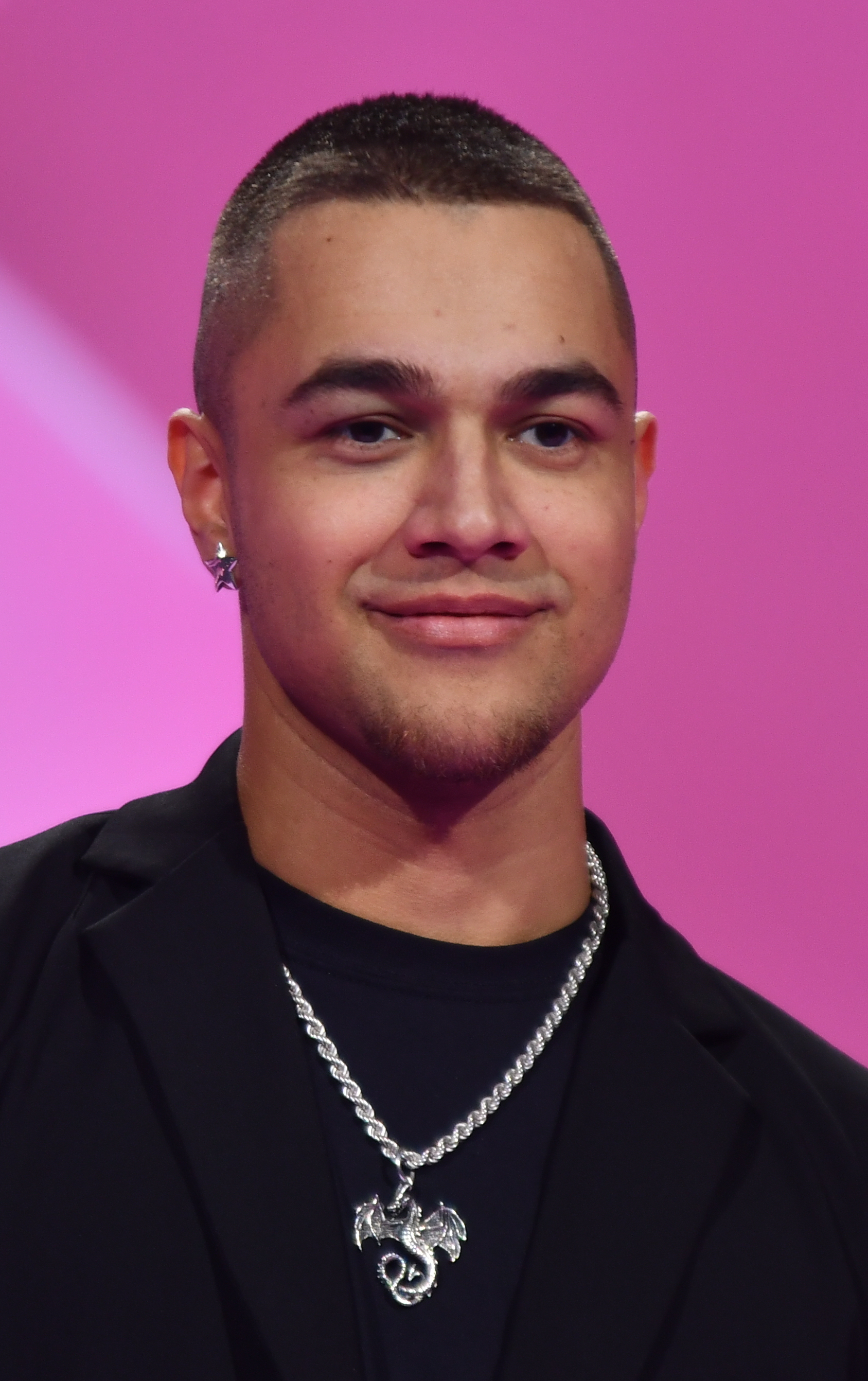
- Liamoo in 2024

Background information
- Born: Liam Pablito Cacatian Thomassen; 10 September 1997 (age 28); Essunga, Sweden
- Origin: Gothenburg, Sweden
- Genres: Pop; rap
- Instrument: Vocals
- Years active: 2016–present
- Labels: Warner (2021); Universal (former)

Liam Cacatian Thomassen (born 10 September 1997), known professionally as Liamoo (Swedish pronunciation: [lɪˈɑ̌ːmʊ]), is a Swedish singer. In 2016, he won the twelfth season of Swedish Idol series and released his winner's single "Playing with Fire".

== Early life ==
Cacatian Thomassen has roots in Sweden, Norway, Finland, and the Philippines. He has spoken about being bullied in school and dropping out of school in first year of upper secondary school.

== Career ==
=== 2016–2018: Idol and first single ===
In 2016, Cacatian Thomassen auditioned to take part in the twelfth season of Swedish Idol. During the Qualifying Week he took part in the fourth heat performing the song "Sure Thing", he failed to qualify for the Finals, but went through as a wildcard. He made it through the live shows to the final along with Rebecka Karlsson and Charlie Grönvall. On 9 December 2016 he won the contest. After winning Idol, Cacatian Thomassen released his winner's single "Playing with Fire". The song peaked at number 6 on the Swedish Singles Chart.

=== 2018–present: Melodifestivalen ===
Liamoo competed in Melodifestivalen 2018 with the song "Last Breath", and finished in sixth place in the final. He also participated in Melodifestivalen 2019 with the song "Hold You" in a duet with Hanna Ferm; they finished in third place. He then participated in Melodifestivalen 2022 with the song "Bluffin", where he finished in fourth place in the final. He was again selected to compete in 2024 with "Dragon"; he came first in his semi-final on 10 February 2024, directly qualifying for the final.

== Discography ==
=== Singles ===
==== As lead artist ====
Title	Year	Peak chart positions		Certifications	Album
Title	Year	SWE	POL	Certifications	Album
"Playing with Fire"	2016	6	—	GLF: Platinum	Non-album singles
"Burn"	2017	—	—		Non-album singles
"It Ain't Easy"	2017	—	—		Non-album singles
"Last Breath"	2018	9	—	GLF: Platinum	Melodifestivalen 2018
"Journey"	2018	—	—		Non-album single
"Hold You" (with Hanna Ferm)	2019	2	—		Melodifestivalen 2019
"Guld, svett & tårar" (with Klara Hammarström)	2022	—	—		Sveriges Officiella OS-låt Peking 2022
"Bluffin"	2022	8	—		Melodifestivalen 2022
"Running with Lightning" (with Kuba Szmajkowski)	2023	—	14		Non-album single
"Dragon"	2024	8	—		Melodifestivalen 2024
"Love on Repeat"	2024	—	—		Non-album singles
"Flame" (with Smash Into Pieces)	2024	—	—		Non-album singles
"Hjärtan"	2024	—	—		Non-album singles
"Before the Night Is Over"	2024	—	—		Non-album singles
"—" denotes a single that did not chart or was not released in that territory.

==== As featured artist ====
Title	Year	Peak chart positions	Certifications	Album
Title	Year	SWE	Certifications	Album
"Forever Young" (John de Sohn featuring Liamoo)	2018	38	GLF: Gold	Non-album single

=== Other charted songs ===
Title	Year	Peak chart positions	Album
Title	Year	SWE	Album
"Beautiful Silence"	2016	42	Non-album song
