= Chris Kläfford =

Swedish singer-songwriter (born 1989)

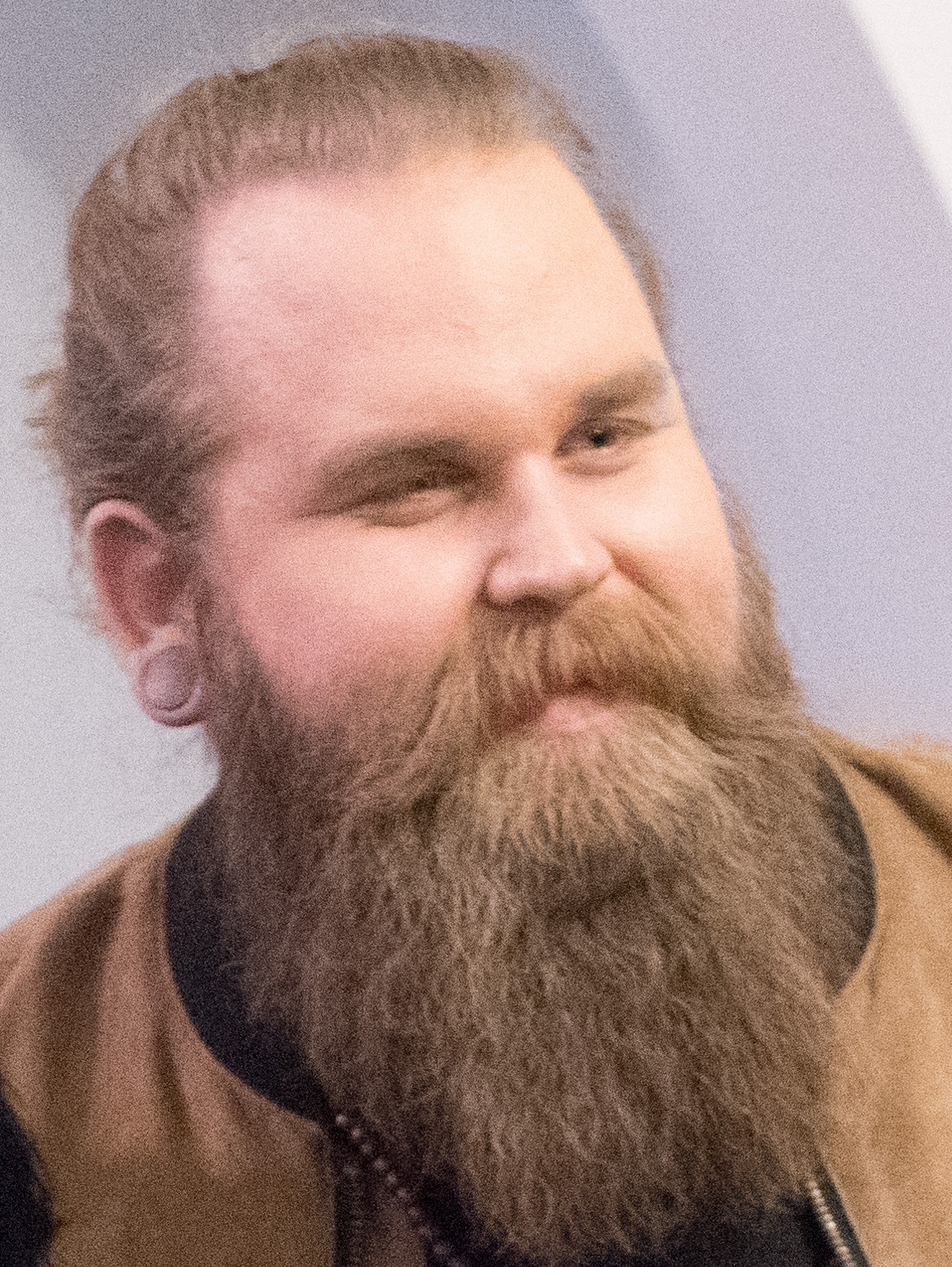
- Kläfford in 2018

Background information
- Born: Mikael Christoffer Sjögren; 10 April 1989 (age 37); Ramsberg, Sweden
- Origin: Ramsberg, Sweden
- Genres: Pop; soul; acoustic; rock; country
- Occupations: Singer; songwriter
- Instruments: Vocals; guitar
- Years active: 2010–present
- Labels: Universal AB; HoxFord

Mikael Christoffer Kläfford Sjögren (born 10 April 1989) is a Swedish singer and songwriter, born in Ramsberg, Sweden.

== Career ==
Kläfford began his music career performing for 10 years in small bars. In 2017, Kläfford won the thirteenth season of the Swedish Idol series. Kläfford has a total of three top five singles on national radio in a year and more than 35 million streams, platinum sales and sold-out concerts. He's the only winner having both the #1 and #7 most streaming singles at the same time. In the summer of 2018, he embarked on a tour consisting of 50 shows in Sweden. In 2019, Kläfford toured in Sweden together with the band Gyllene Tider on their farewell tour.

Kläfford participated in the 14th series of America's Got Talent, broadcast in 2019, where his first song choice was John Lennon's "Imagine", which he also sang in the Idol finale. His performance of "Imagine" is one of the most viewed videos on his YouTube channel. He was eliminated in the semifinals.

== Discography ==
=== Studio albums ===
List of studio albums, with selected chart positions
Title	Details	Peak chart positions
Title	Details	SWE
Maybe It's Just Me	Released: 31 March 2023; Label: Universal AB; Formats: CD, digital download, streaming	49
What I'm Running From	Released: 14 February 2025; Label: HoxFord, Universal AB; Formats: CD, digital download, streaming	—
"—" denotes a recording that did not chart or was not released in that territory.

=== Extended plays ===
List of extended plays, with selected chart positions
Title	Details	Peak chart positions
Title	Details	SWE
Treading Water EP	Released: 15 December 2017; Label: Universal AB; Formats: CD, digital download, streaming	3
Something Like Me	Released: 31 May 2019; Label: Universal AB; Formats: Digital download, streaming	—
Legacy (Acoustic)	Released: 26 February 2021; Label: Universal AB; Formats: Digital download, streaming	—
"—" denotes a recording that did not chart or was not released in that territory.

=== Singles ===
List of singles, with selected chart positions, showing year released and album name
Title	Year	Peak chart positions	Album
Title	Year	SWE	Album
"Treading Water"	2017	3	Treading Water EP
"What Happened to Us"	2018	— (Note: "What Happened to Us" did not enter the Swedish Singellista Chart, but peaked at number three on the Swedish Heatseeker Chart.)	Non-album singles
"Sober"	2018	—	Non-album singles
"Sick"	2018	—	Non-album singles
"Cold at the Altar"	2019	—	Something Like Me
"If Not with You, for You"	2019	— (Note: "If Not with You, for You" did not enter the Swedish Singellista chart, but peaked at number 10 on the Swedish Heatseeker Chart.)	Something Like Me
"Lost Someone"	2020	—	Non-album singles
"Remember When"	2020	—	Non-album singles
"Chasing Heartaches"	2021	—	Non-album singles
"Be Alright"	2021	—	Maybe It's Just Me
"Buried"	2022	—	Maybe It's Just Me
"This Kind of Love"	2022	—	Maybe It's Just Me
"Santa Claus Is Coming to Town"	2022	— (Note: "Santa Claus Is Coming to Town" did not enter the Swedish Singellista Chart, but peaked at number 17 on the Swedish Heatseeker Chart.)	Non-album single
"Headlights"	2023	—	Maybe It's Just Me
"I Do"	2023	—	Maybe It's Just Me
"Small Town Ghost"	2024	—	What I'm Running From
"A Sinner's Life"	2025	—	What I'm Running From
"Older"	2025	—	Tystnaden (soundtrack)
"Ain't Built for Leaving"	2026	—	Non-album single
"—" denotes a single that did not chart or was not released in that territory.

=== Other charted songs ===
List of songs, with selected chart positions, showing year released and album name
Title	Year	Peak chart positions	Album
Title	Year	SWE	Album
"Imagine"	2017	8	Treading Water EP
"Wicked Game"	2017	— (Note: "Wicked Game" did not enter the Swedish Singellista chart, but peaked at number five on the Swedish Heatseeker chart.)	Treading Water EP
"Take Me to Church"	2017	— (Note: "Take Me to Church" did not enter the Swedish Singellista chart, but peaked at number 18 on the Swedish Heatseeker chart.)	Treading Water EP
"—" denotes a song that did not chart or was not released in that territory.
