= Aberdeen floating village =

Aberdeen Floating Village 香港仔水上人家
- Floating Village
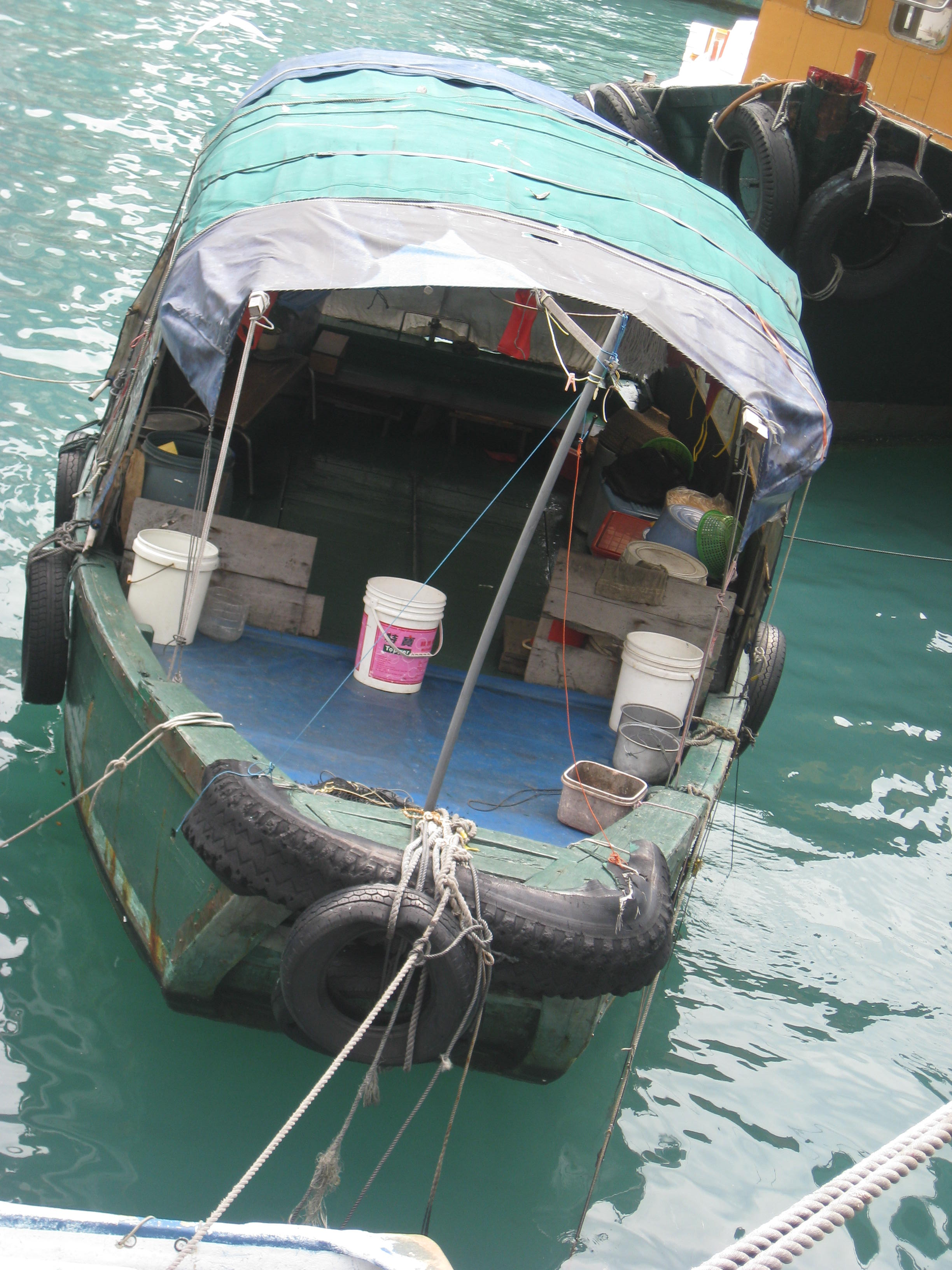
- Country: Hong Kong
- District: Southern District
- Constituency: Aberdeen

Population
  - Total: 6,000

Aberdeen floating village
- Chinese: 香港仔水上人家
- Literal meaning: Little Hong Kong (that is, Aberdeen) on water households
Transcriptions
Standard Mandarin
- Hanyu Pinyin: Xiānggǎngzǎi Shuǐshàng Rénjiā
Yue: Cantonese
- Yale Romanization: Hēung góng jái séui séuhng yàhn gā
- Jyutping: Heong1 gong2 zai2 seoi2 seong6 jan4 gaa1

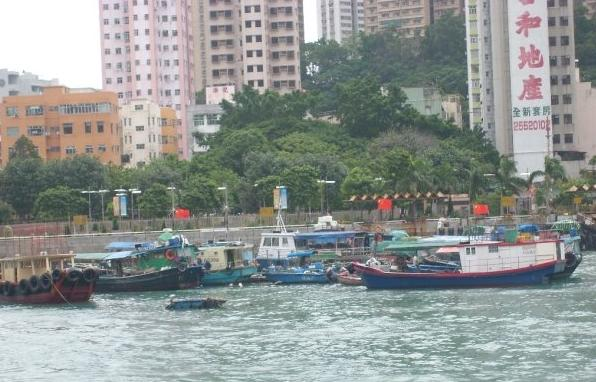
Boats at the Aberdeen Floating Village.

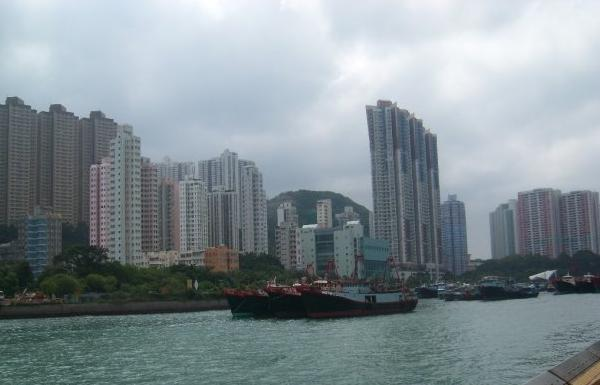
View of Aberdeen Floating Village from the water.

The Aberdeen Floating Village is a fishing port situated in the Aberdeen area of the Southern District of Hong Kong. The port accommodates approximately 600 junk boats used for residential and commercial purposes. As of 2025, approximately 6,000 people reside within the vicinity of the Port area.

== History ==
Since the 19th century, Aberdeen has been an important fishing port in Hong Kong. It remains the only fishing port in the Southern District of Hong Kong. Over one-third of the fish caught in Hong Kong are processed in Aberdeen port.

In the 1990s and 2000s, the population of the Aberdeen Floating Village community decreased due to the rapid development of fisheries in the Guangdong Province of mainland China, as well as an overall increase in operating costs within Hong Kong proper. The total population of boat dwellers in Hong Kong was estimated to be 2,000 in 1841, 150,000 in 1963, and 40,000 in 1982.

The majority of the people with boats do not permanently reside on their boats but instead use them to fish during the day, as most of the descendants of the original floating people have relocated to land-based accommodations.

During the Pacific Typhoon Season in June and July and the corresponding Fishing Moratorium Period, more than 1,000 fishing vessels from the village anchor in safe harbor at the Aberdeen Typhoon Shelter.

=== Citizens ===
The majority of the floating village's residents belong to the Tanka (蜑家) community who migrated to Hong Kong from Southern China between the 7th and 9th centuries. The term 'Tanka' is an exonym of Cantonese origin translated literally as "egg people" - originating from the fact that the group historically paid taxes with eggs instead of currency . While the Tanka people use this term to refer to themselves, its usage by outsiders is regarded as derogatory compared to more neutral terms such as shuishangren (水上人), meaning "people living on water". The village is also home to members of the Han-descended Hoklo (福佬人) ethnic group.

There are many other people in Aberdeen Village who neither live nor work on boats, though nearly all residents have a regular diet of fresh seafood, widely available for sale from docked fishing boats, market stands or seafood restaurants. Aberdeen Harbor was formerly home to the famous Jumbo Kingdom Floating Restaurant, which closed in 2020 due to the COVID-19 pandemic before capsizing and sinking in the South China Sea. However, the neighboring Tai Pak Floating Restaurant continues to operate.

On land the parks along the waterfront are well-known places for residents and visitors to exercise and socialize. Some of the Boat People operate sampans along the waterfront and can be hired as tour guides, offering 20 to 30 minute boat rides to the nearby small islands or the points along the harbor, pointing out sights along the way. The standard fare ranges from HK$50 to HK$80 in Hong Kong Dollars.

== Fishing ==
Fishermen earn their living from fisheries beyond the coast. Upon returning to port, hauls are handed over to the Fish Marketing Organization (F.M.O.) for wholesaling, direct sale to wet markets, or directly to seafood restaurants. Trawling is the most common method used by fishermen in the South China Sea and East China Sea, though the method used ultimately depends on the intended type of catch.

Hong Kong fishermen employ several techniques for netting fish. One method, known as gillnetting, involves pulling a long net from behind the boat. Another method, seine fishing, has fishermen place a circular net into the water once they see a school of fish swim by. Long-lining consists of the fishing boat pulling a string, tagged with smaller fish, to lure other fish.

For catching shrimp, fishermen have to trawl in a unique way, during which they throw small bags into the sea. However, shrimp trawlers account for only a small portion of the Hong Kong fishing fleet. Currently, the most common trawlers in Hong Kong are the Hang Trawlers, Sten Trawlers, Purse Seiners, and Gill-Netters. While they were originally sail-powered, most of the local fishing boat junks were mechanized after the Pacific War.

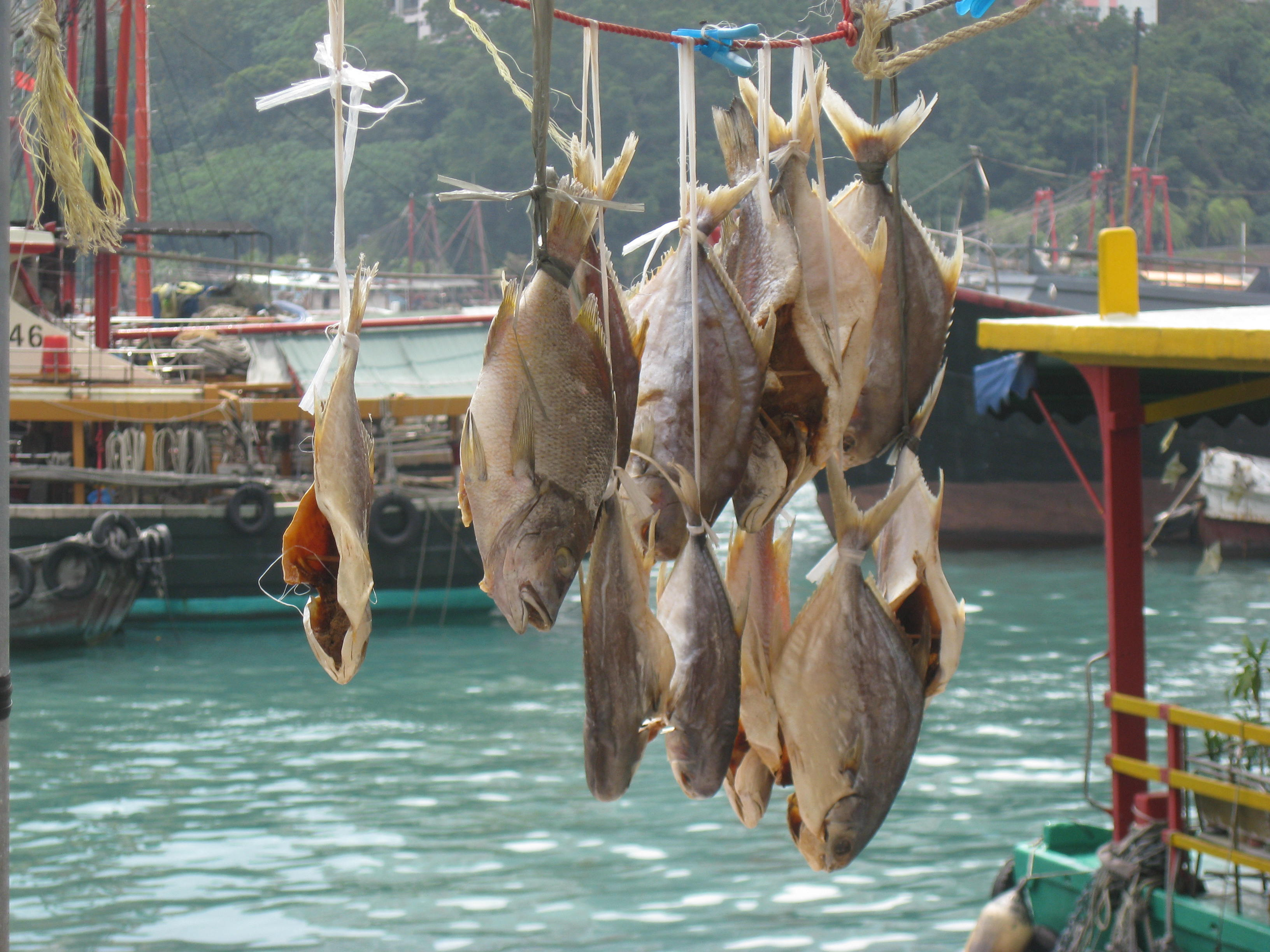
Drying salt fish caught in the waters of Aberdeen.

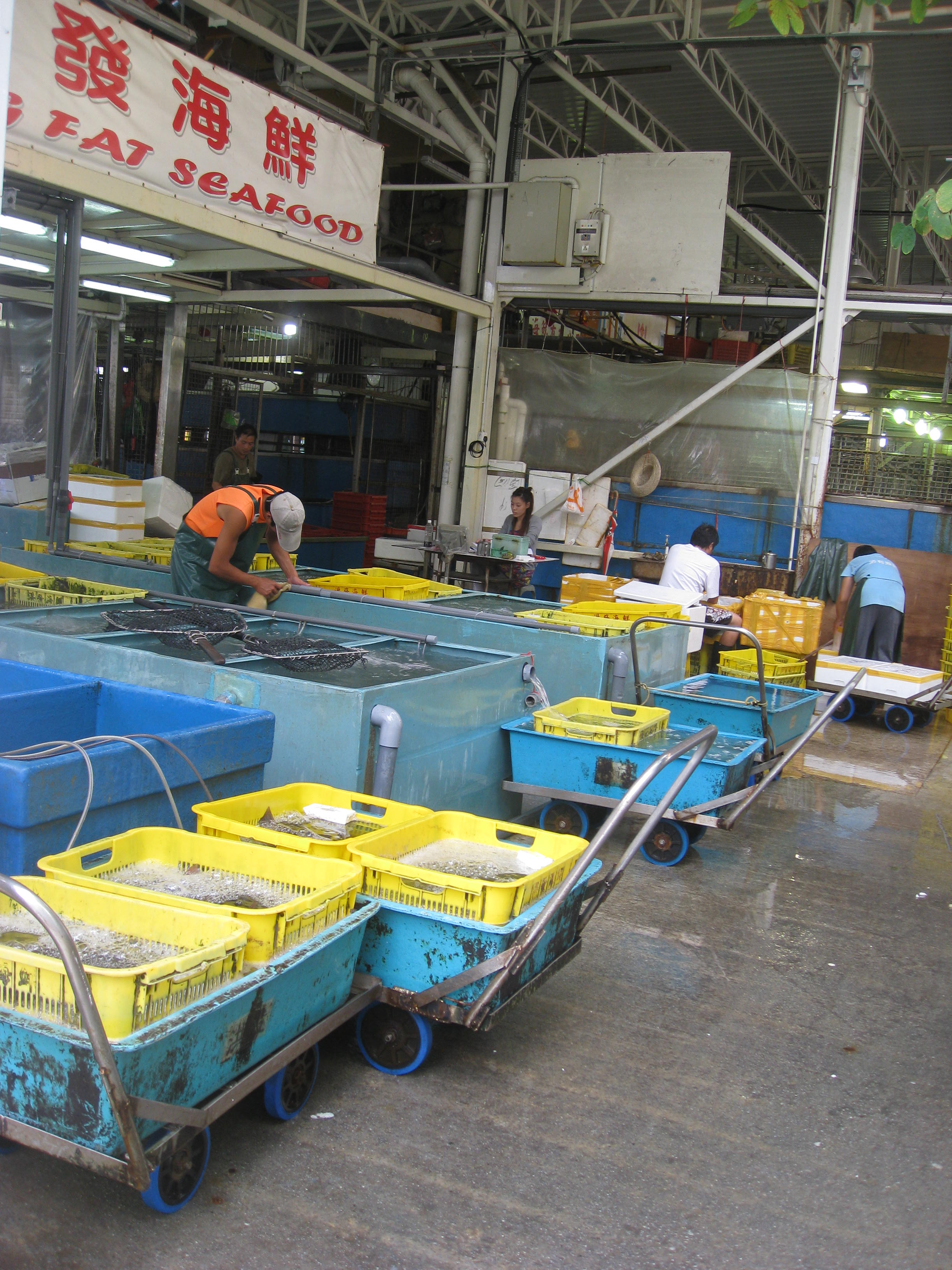
The fish market at the Aberdeen floating village organized by the F.M.O.

The Fish Marketing Organization (F.M.O.) provides fishermen with marketing services and retailers in the village. The wholesale fish markets operated by the F.M.O. are located along the Aberdeen Promenade.

== Tourism ==
The scenery and seafood the fishing port of Aberdeen offers has led to its popularity as a tourist attraction. The Hong Kong Tourist Association and the Government of Hong Kong have promoted Aberdeen in order to benefit the local economy.

=== Ferries and Sampans ===
While, Aberdeen has been transformed into a semi-commercial district, it has in many ways maintained the atmosphere of an old fishing village. Riding traditional sampans around the typhoon shelter or crossing the waters to Ap Lei Chau is a particularly popular activity for tourists. The sampans to Ap Lei Chau accept the Octopus Card.

Along the Aberdeen Promenade are ferryboats to popular destinations such as Ap Lei Chau, Lamma, and Po Toi. There are also shuttle ferries to the floating restaurants and sampans for hire for sightseeing.

Every morning the Aberdeen boat people catch fresh fish to make fish balls, which are used to create the local Aberdeen specialty, "Fish Ball Noodles". Boat people use both traditional and modern methods of cooking fish ball noodles.

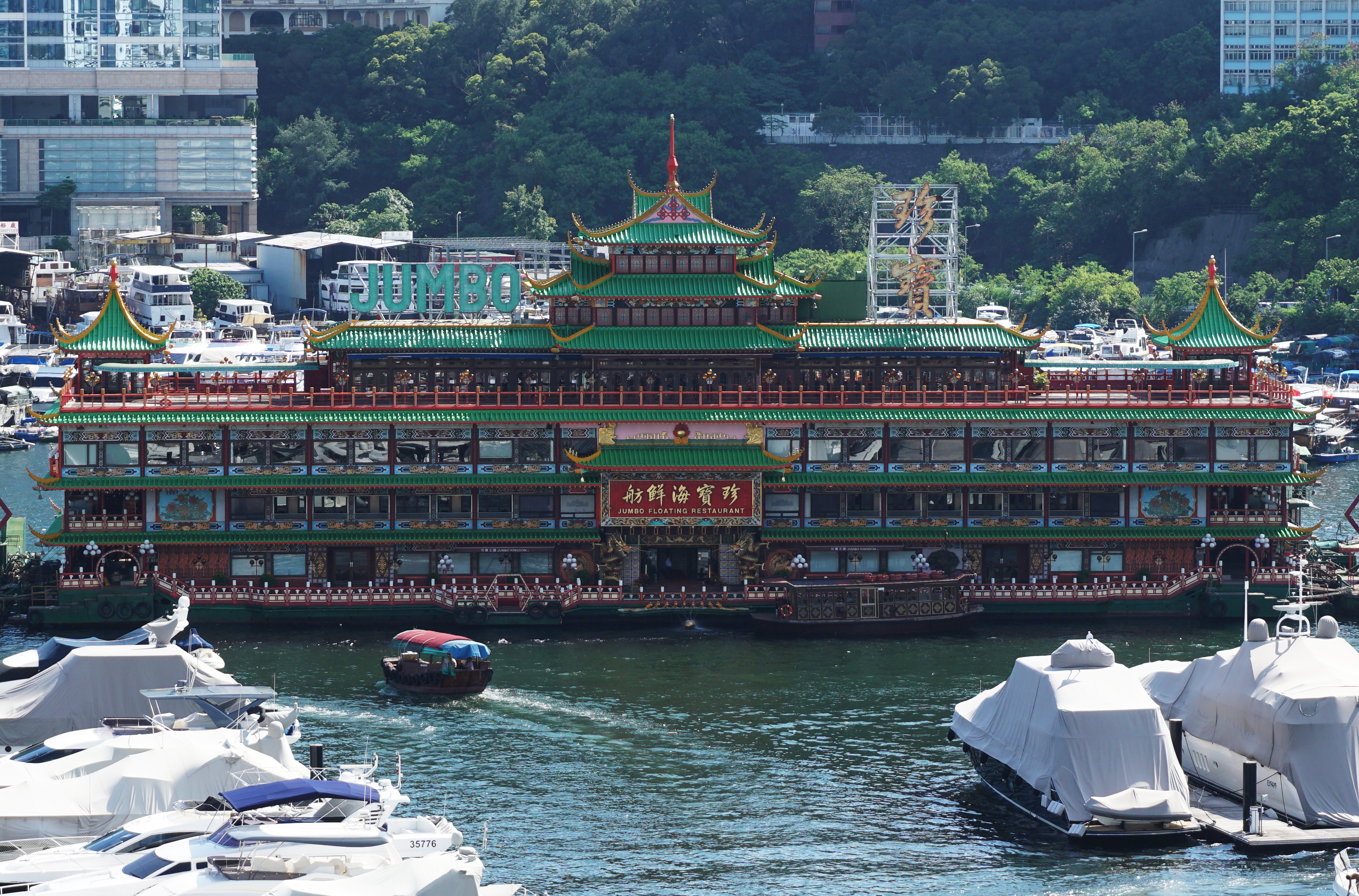
The Jumbo Floating Restaurant in 2017.

=== Jumbo Floating Restaurant ===
The Jumbo Floating Restaurant was a tourist attraction in Aberdeen. It was a double-story boat that served Cantonese-style cooked seafood. The restaurant was temporarily closed during the COVID-19 outbreak of 2020. On 14 June 2022, the barge was towed out of Hong Kong to transfer the restaurants to new owners in Cambodia before capsizing in the South China Sea during stormy weather near the Paracel Islands on 19 June 2022.

=== Aberdeen Country Park ===
The Aberdeen Country Park is built around the reservoirs on the southern side of Hong Kong and contains walking paths and promenades. The longest trail can be completed within an hour. The Hong Kong Tourist Association has an information center in the park's southern section providing maps and pamphlets.

=== Aberdeen Tin Hau Temple ===
The Tin Hau Temple in Aberdeen was founded in 1851 and is dedicated to the Goddess Tin Hau. Every April (on the 23rd day of the third lunar month), the temple hosts ceremonies for Tin Hau's birthday. During the ceremony, residents decorate their boats along the shore and perform lion dances outside the temple.

== Gallery ==
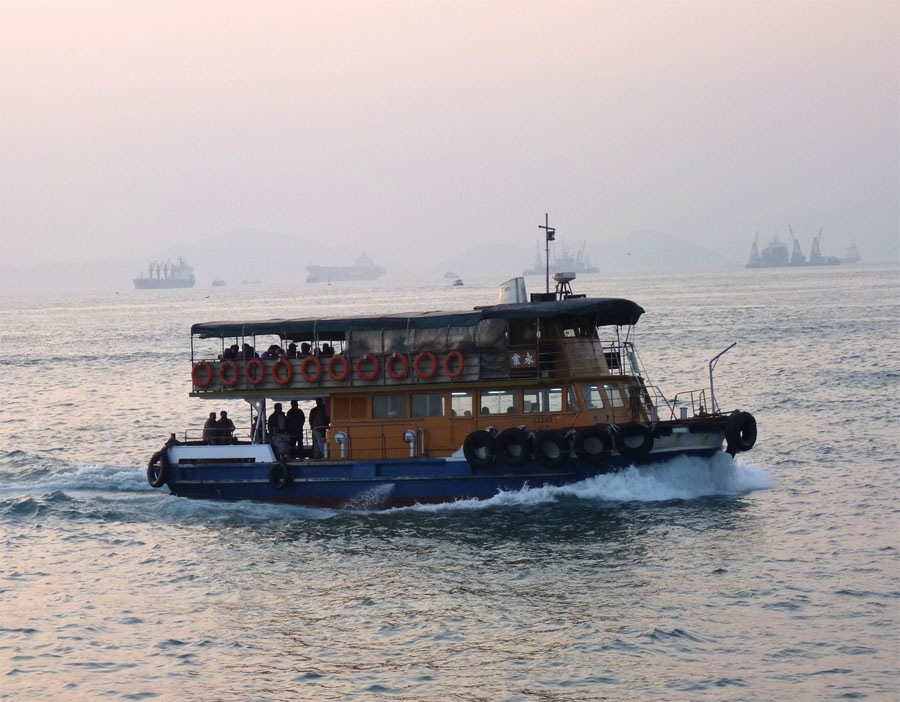
The ferry service running between Lamma Island & Aberdeen is operated by Chuen Kee Ferry.

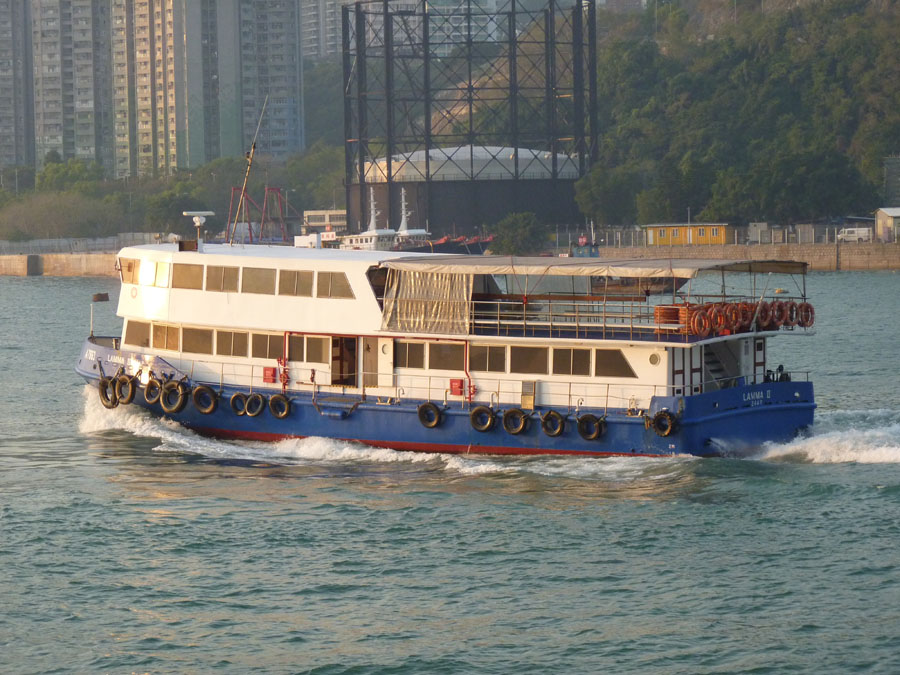
Ferry service between Aberdeen to Pak Kok Tsuen and Yung Shue Wan (Lamma Island) is operated by Tsui Wah Ferry Co.

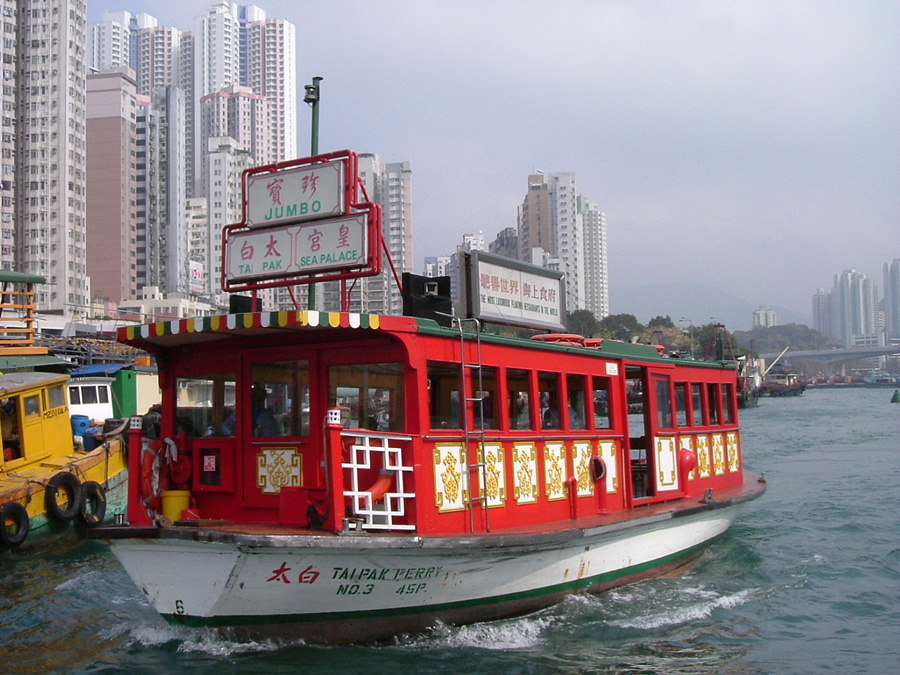
Shuttle boat from Aberdeen Promenade or from Sham Wan pier to Jumbo Floating Restaurant.
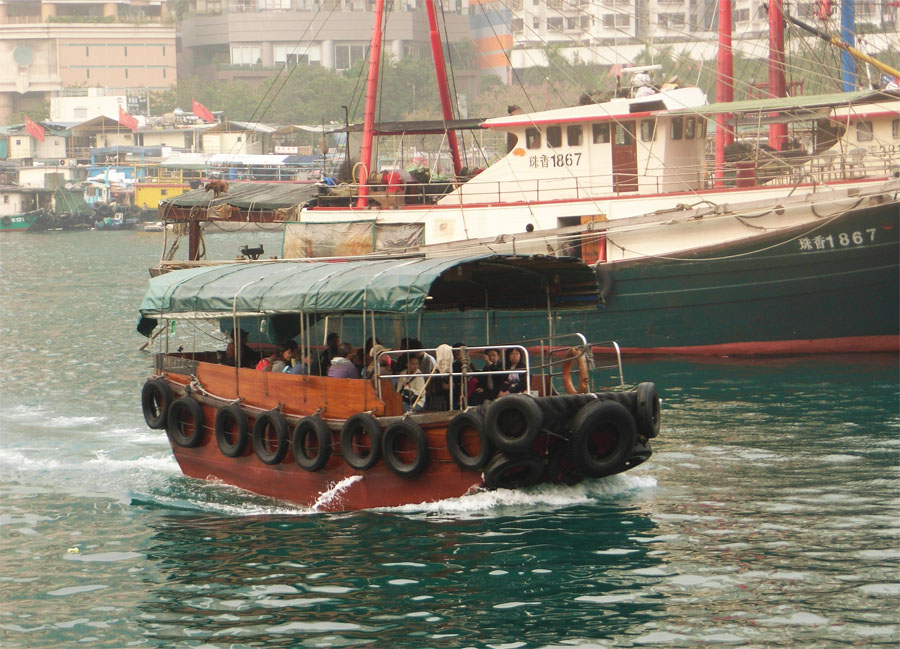
Small sampans are used as a common mode of transportation between Aberdeen & Ap Lei Chau Island.

A sightseeing Sampan.

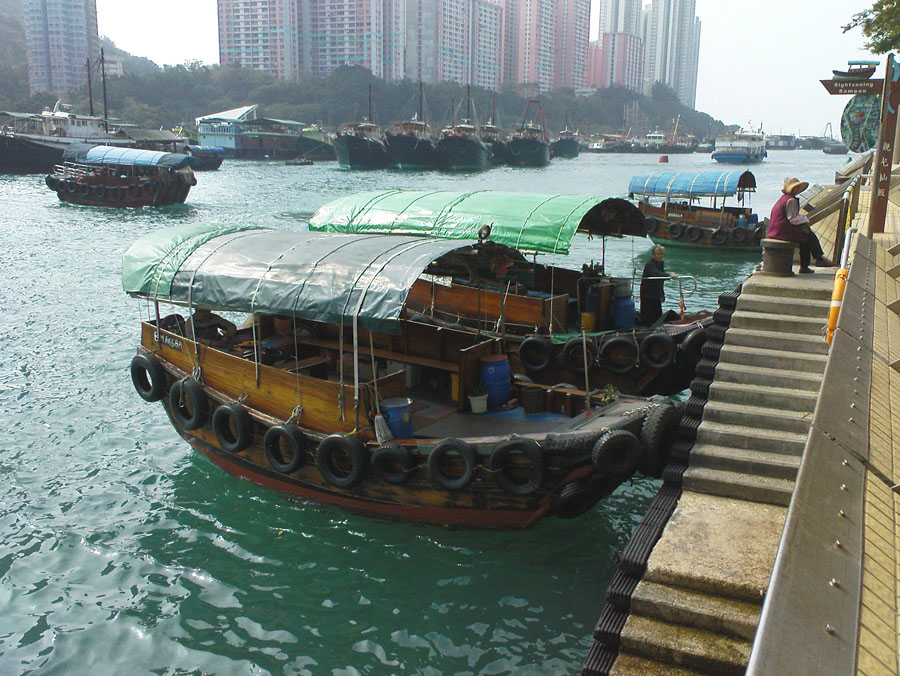
Sightseeing Sampan at the shore of Aberdeen side.

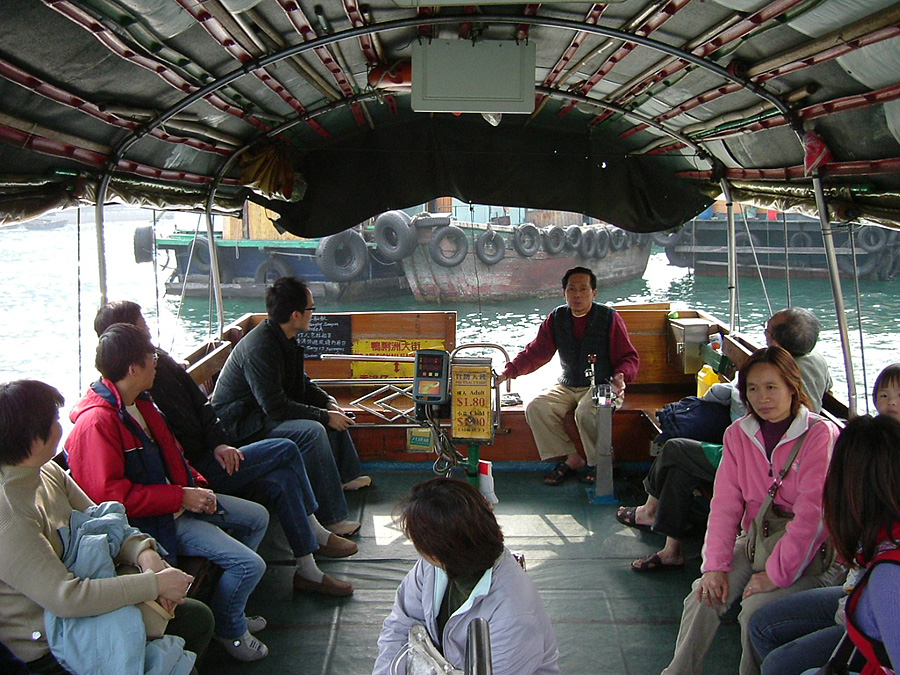
Inside a sampan being used as public transportation between Aberdeen & Ap Lei Chau Island. Note the Octopus Card scanner in the middle.

== See also ==
- Yau Ma Tei boat people
