= Aberdeen, Hong Kong =

Area of Hong Kong

Coordinates: 22°14′52″N 114°09′06″E

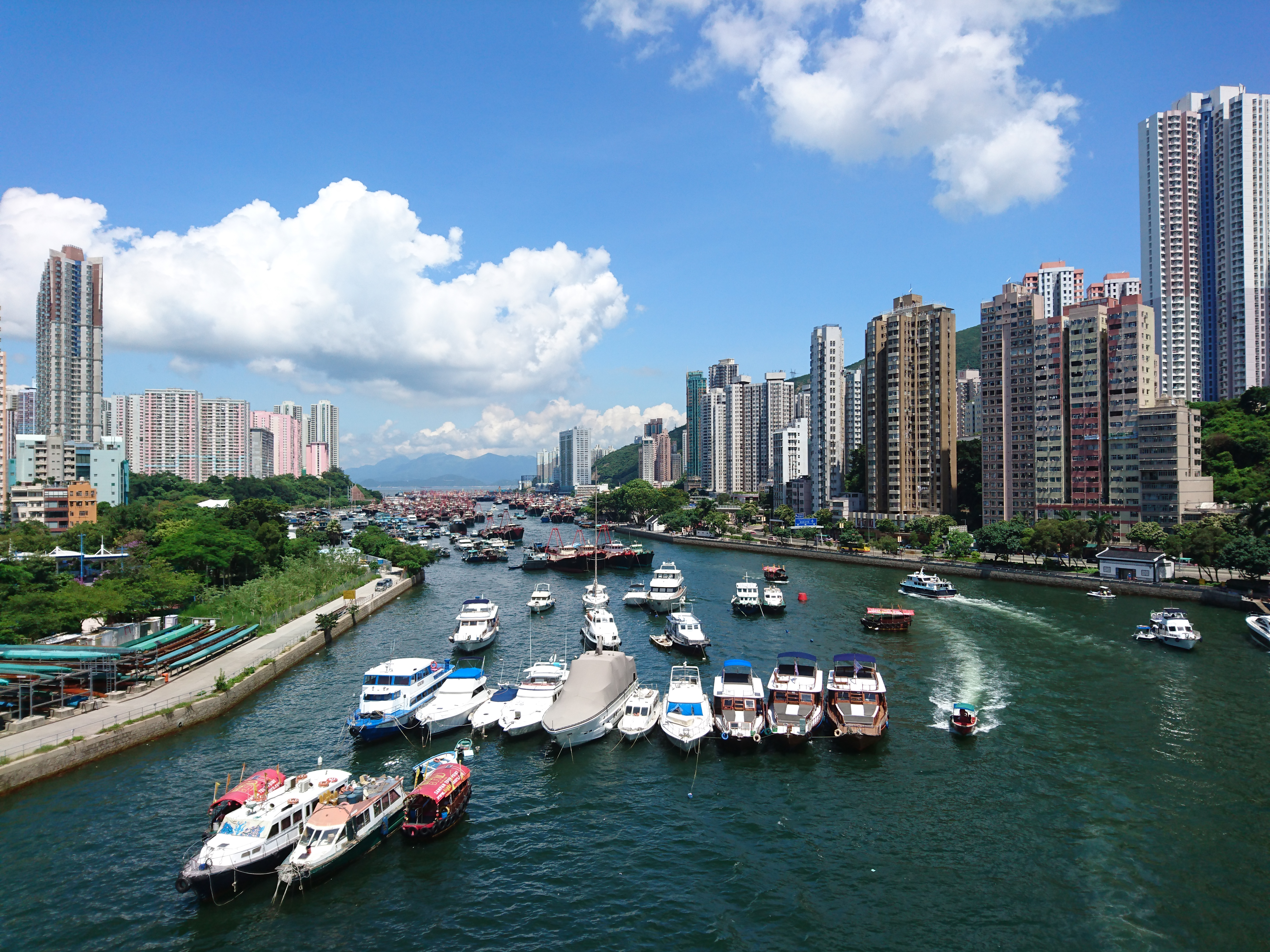
- The view of Aberdeen Harbour from Ap Lei Chau Bridge
- Chinese: 香港仔
- Cantonese Yale: Hēunggóngjái
- Literal meaning: Little Hong Kong
Transcriptions
Standard Mandarin
- Hanyu Pinyin: Xiānggǎngzǎi
Yue: Cantonese
- Yale Romanization: Hēunggóngjái
- Jyutping: Hoeng^{1}gong^{2}zai^{2}

Aberdeen (/ˌæbərˈdiːn/ AB-ər-DEEN; Chinese: 香港仔; Jyutping: hoeng1 gong2 zai2; lit. 'Little Hong Kong') is an area on southwest Hong Kong Island in Hong Kong. Administratively, it is part of the Southern District. While the name "Aberdeen" could be taken in a broad sense to encompass the areas of Aberdeen (town), Wong Chuk Hang, Ap Lei Chau, Tin Wan, Wah Kwai Estate and Wah Fu Estate, it is more often used to refer to the town only. According to the population census conducted in 2011, the total population of the Aberdeen area is approximately 80,000.

Aberdeen is famous not only to tourists but also to Hong Kong locals for its floating village and floating seafood restaurants located in the Aberdeen Harbour. The Tanka people, who used to live on boats in the Aberdeen Harbour, are generally associated with the fishing industry, and there are still several dozens of them living on boats in the harbour.

== Etymology ==
This town is named in memory of George Hamilton-Gordon, 4th Earl of Aberdeen, former Prime Minister of the United Kingdom (1852–1855) and former Secretary of State for Foreign Affairs (1841–1846). The statesman's title referred to Aberdeen in Scotland. Hong Kong's "Aberdeen" is also the name of a harbour and a housing estate:

- Aberdeen Harbour is the harbour between Aberdeen (town) and Ap Lei Chau, and is one of the nine harbours in Hong Kong. It is known for its view and is a popular tourist spot. During the fishing moratorium and typhoon weather, the Aberdeen Typhoon Shelters have provided a parking spot for fishing vessels owned by local fishermen.
- Aberdeen Centre is a private housing estate located in Aberdeen town, owned by Hutchison Whampoa Limited company. The twenty buildings (blocks), providing 2,788 private apartments, have provided a home for Hong Kong middle-class families for more than thirty years.

== History ==
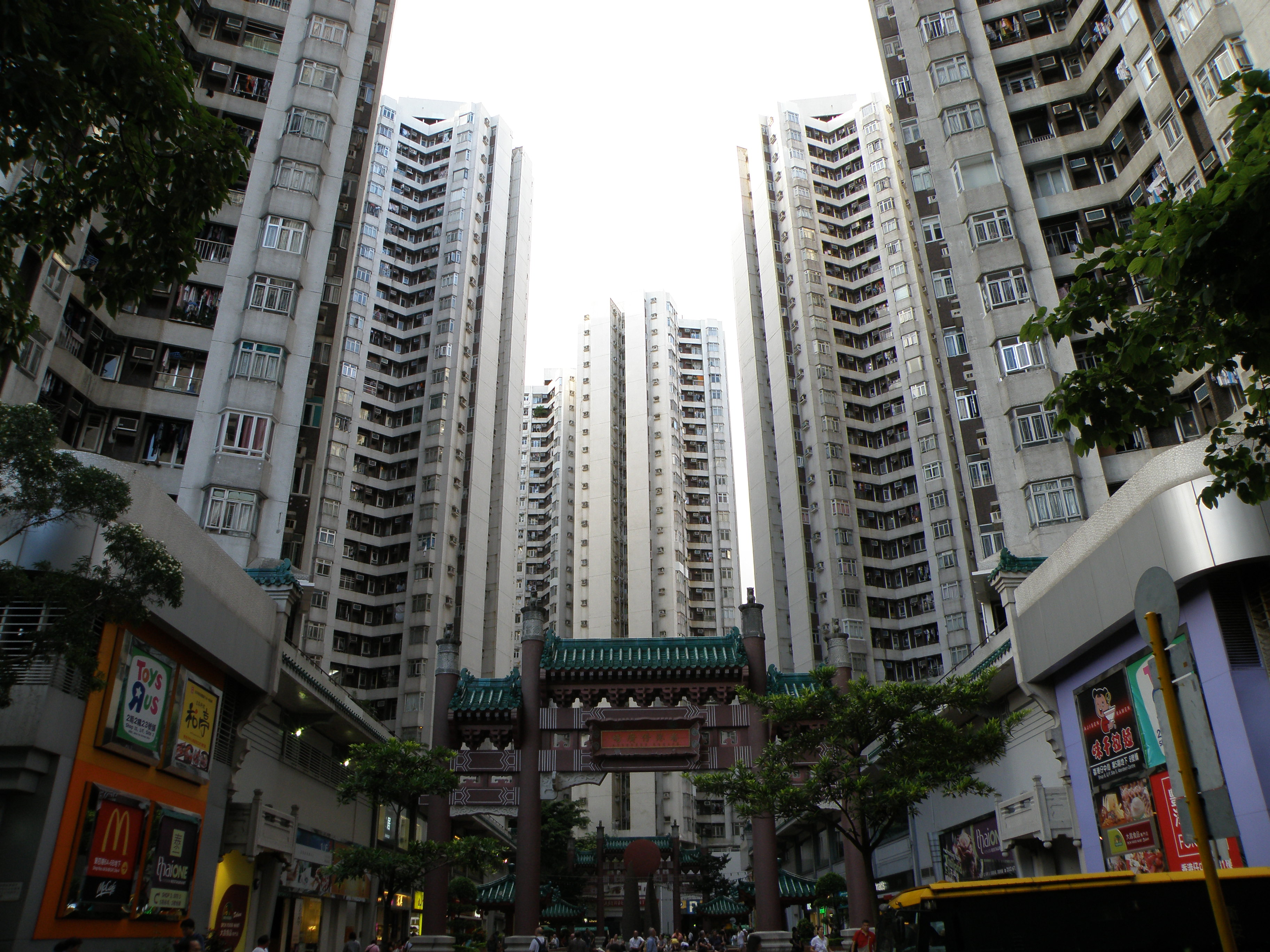
The entrance of the Aberdeen Square in Aberdeen Centre

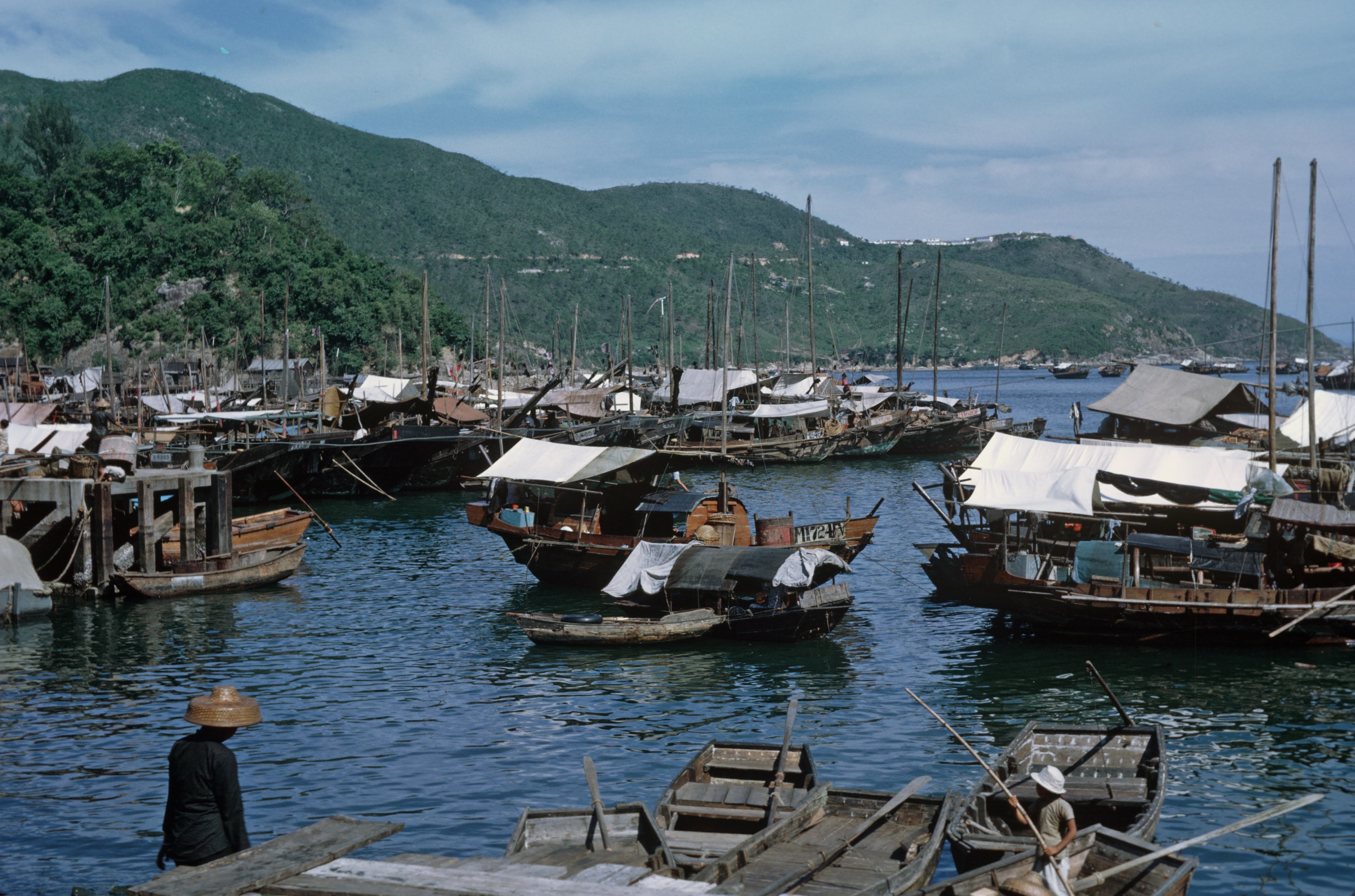
Fishing boats in Aberdeen Harbour in 1963

Starting from the Ming Dynasty, "Hong Kong" became the original name for the presently-named Aberdeen village. In the early 19th century, foreigners who landed near Aberdeen Village mistook the name of the village "Hong Kong" for the whole island. When the foreigners eventually realized their mistake, the name "Hong Kong" was already commonly used to refer to the entire island.

In Cantonese, Aberdeen is known indigenously as Hong Kong Tsai which means "Hong Kong Minor", "Son of Hong Kong" or "Little Hong Kong". It is believed that Aberdeen is where the name of Hong Kong (more accurately transcribed as Heung Kong) originates. Heung Kong Tsuen (香港村, "Hong Kong village") on Ap Lei Chau was mentioned on Ming-era maps. Another walled village called Heung Kong Wai in Wong Chuk Hang was also founded during the Qianlong era of the Qing Dynasty. Hong Kong means "fragrant harbour", and it was Aberdeen where incense trees (Aquilaria sinensis) from the New Territories used to be brought for export to other cities in China. One alternative Chinese name was Shek Pai Wan (石排灣).

At the time of the 1911 census, the population of Aberdeen Town was 1,314. The number of males was 951.

In the Second World War, during the Japanese occupation of Hong Kong (1941–1945), the Chinese name of Aberdeen, Hong Kong Tsai, was transformed into Japanese as Moto Hong Kong (元香港), meaning "The Origin of Hong Kong".

== Authorities ==
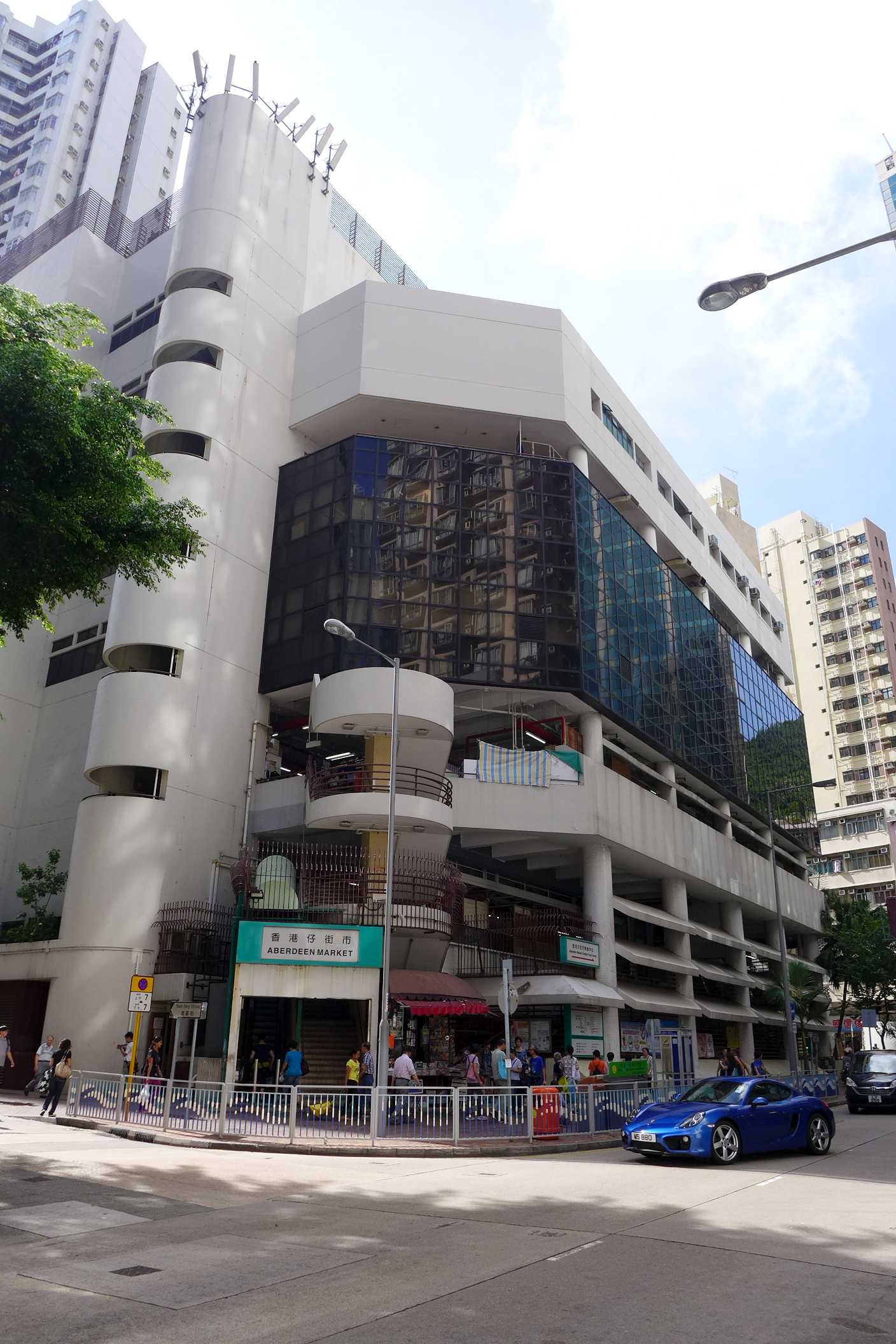
Aberdeen Municipal Services Building before its renovation

The Aberdeen Kai-Fong Association (abbreviated "AKA"; Chinese: 香港仔街坊福利會, literally means "Aberdeen Neighbours Association"), located at 180B Aberdeen Main Road, provides outreach and elderly services throughout the Southern District. It provides teenager services through the Harmony Life Enrichment Centre. It also aims to bridge the divide between teenagers and the elderly in the district through the Linkages Centre, located in Carpark Block, Shek Pai Wan Estate.

The Tung Wah Group of Hospitals organisation has a total of four social enterprises in Aberdeen; one of them is Cookeasy, which is a project in collaboration with the Towngas company, creating job opportunities for the disabled and promoting healthy diet culture.

Aberdeen is one of the 19 constituencies of the Southern District Council. Each constituency has one elected council member in the Southern District Council. As of 2018, the council member representing the area of Aberdeen is Pauline Yam.

== Culture ==
=== Food ===
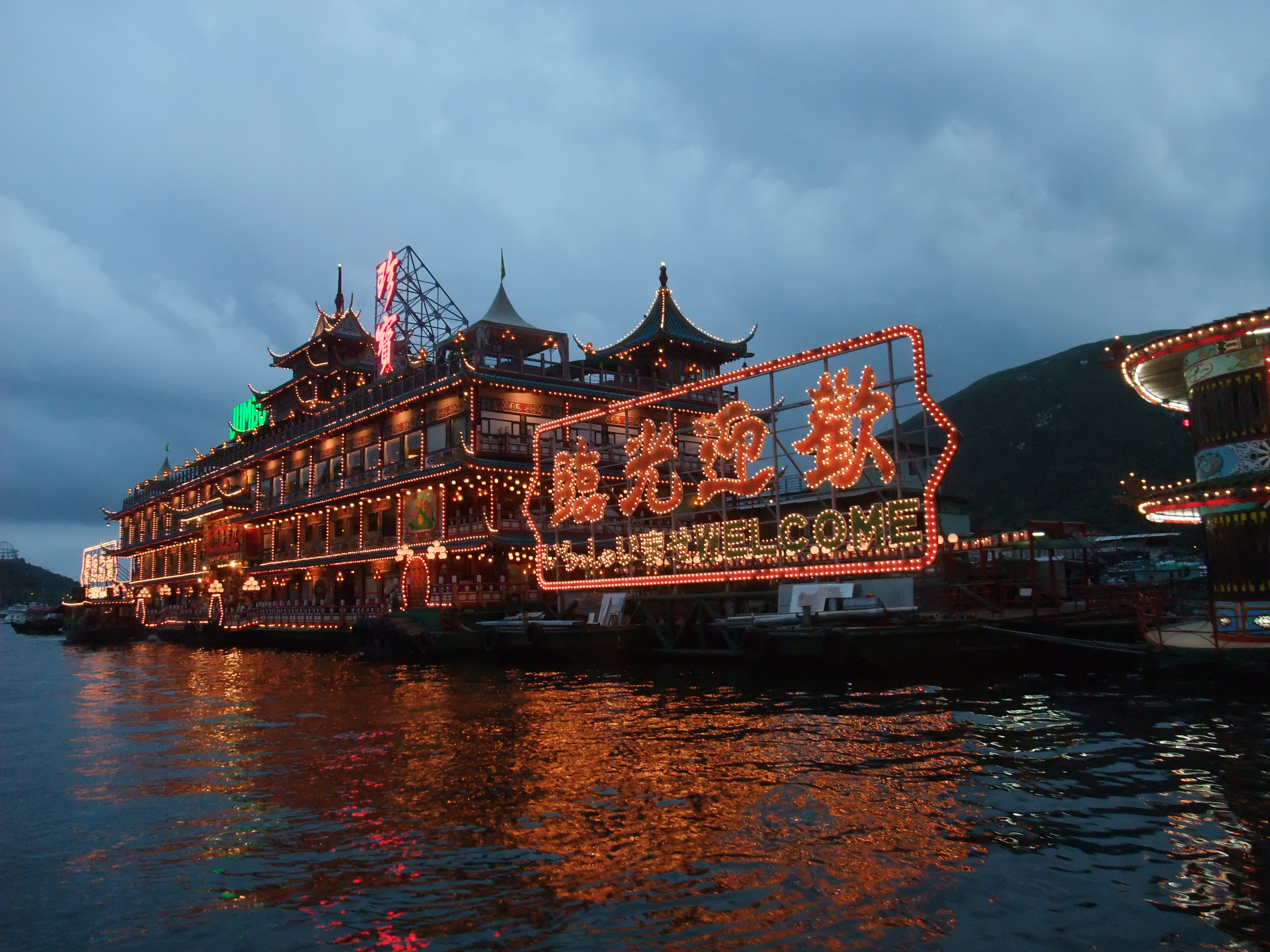
Jumbo Floating Restaurant

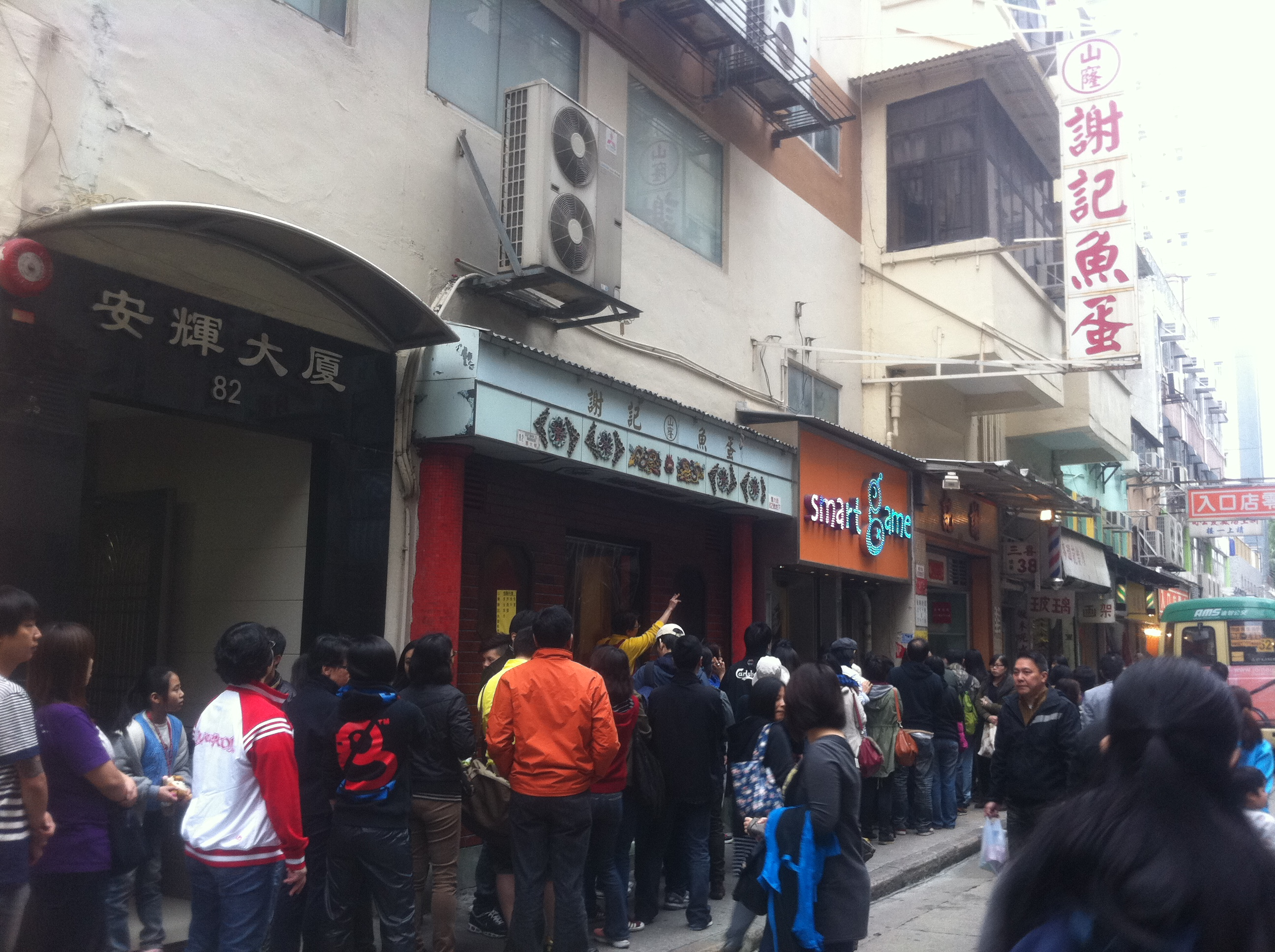
People queuing up in front of Tse Kee Restaurant

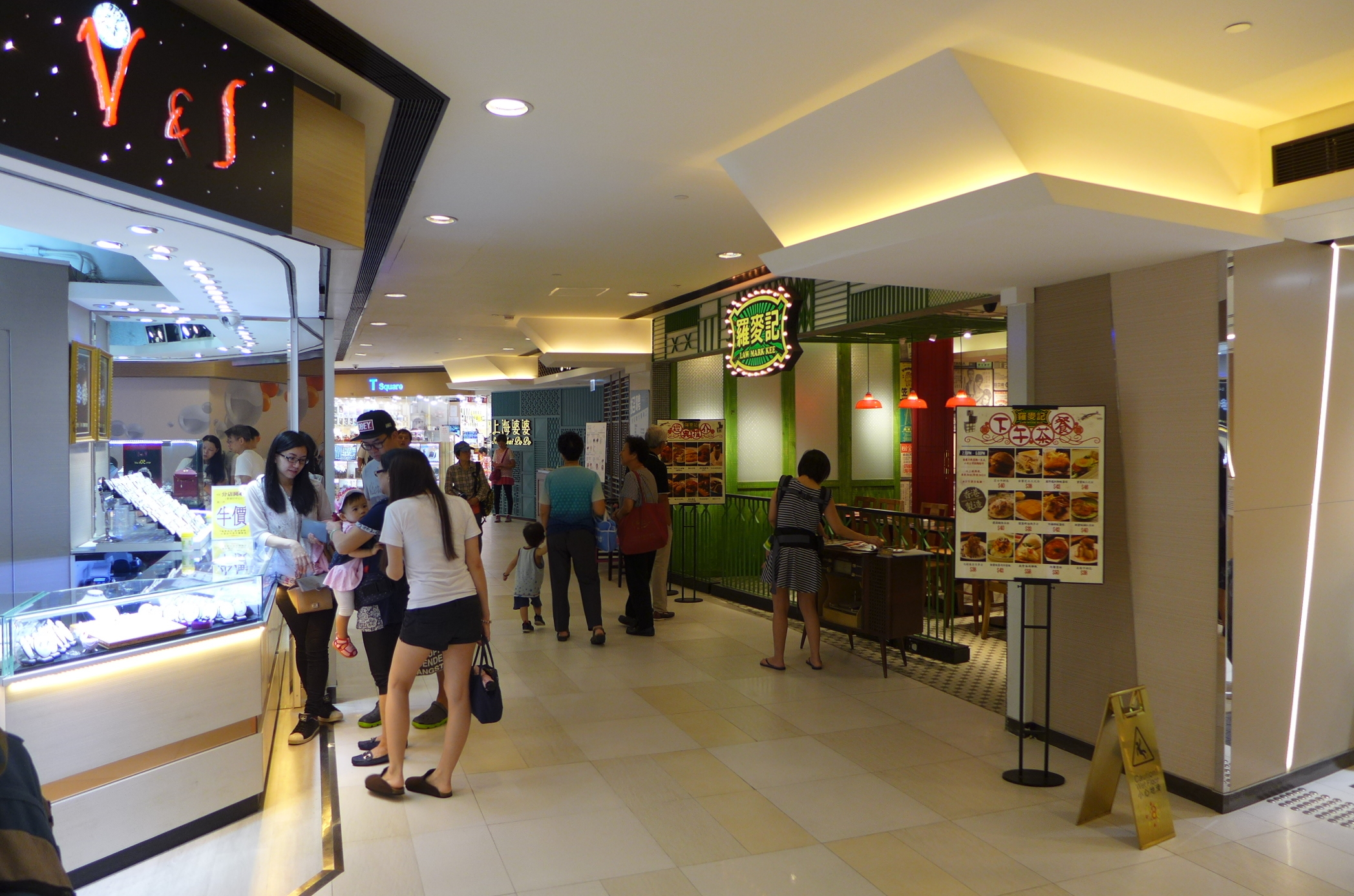
Restaurants in Aberdeen Centre

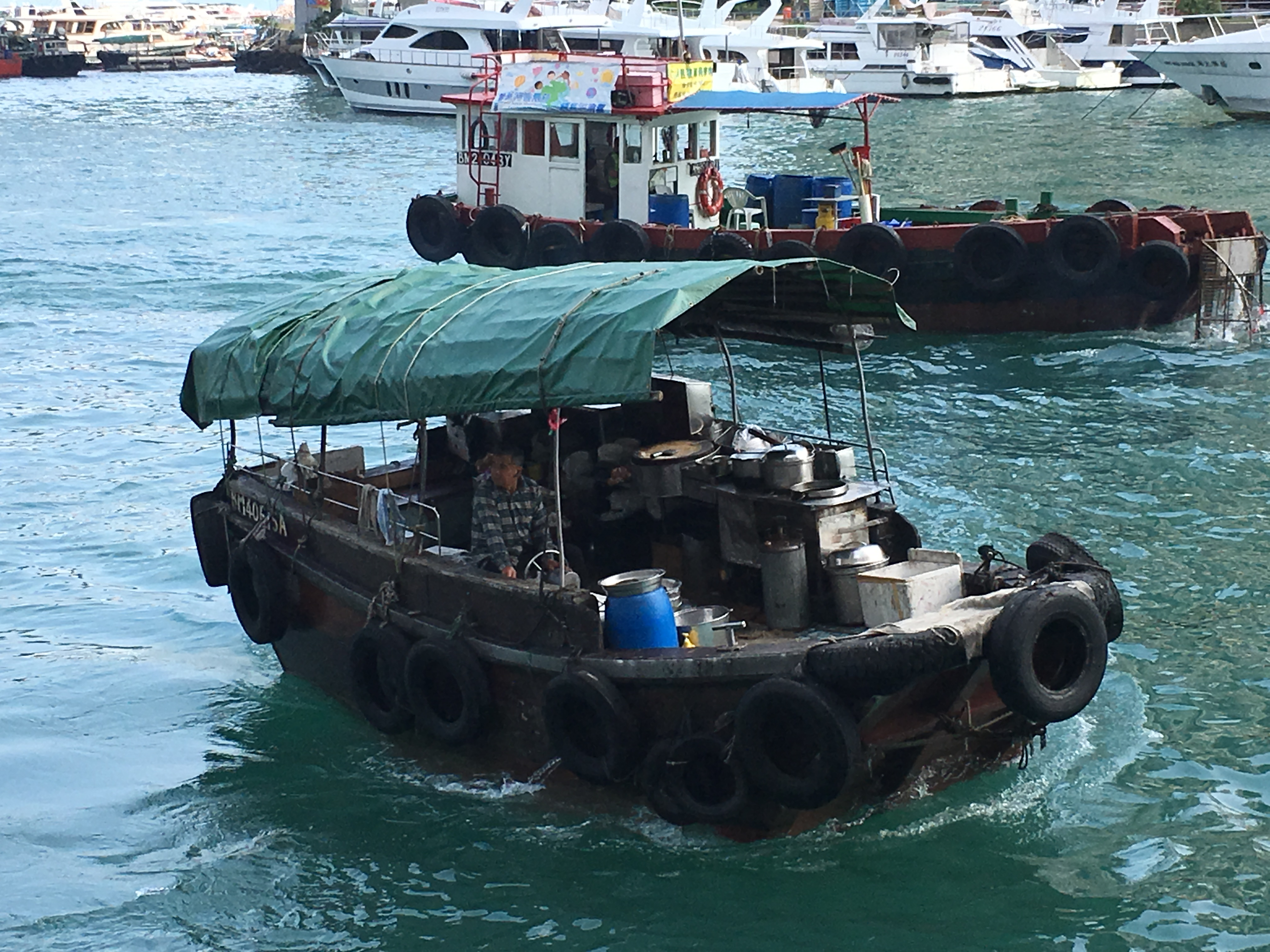
Lau Kee traditional boat noodles

Moored in the harbour between Wong Chuk Hang and Ap Lei Chau, the Jumbo Floating Restaurant was a popular tourist spot. Designed to resemble a floating palace of imperial China, it had attracted over 30 million visitors since it opened in 1976. The restaurant closed in 2020 and capsized in 2022 after leaving Hong Kong.

The family-run Shan Loon Tse Kee Fish Balls Restaurant (山窿謝記) served Chiuchow-style fish ball with soup noodles for 65 years until it closed on 31 March 2012 due to rising fish prices and staffing problems. The Tse Kee Restaurant served famous guests such as Christopher Patten, former Governor of Hong Kong (1992–1997); Donald Tsang, former Chief Executive of Hong Kong (Head of the Government) (2005–2012); Henry Tang, former Chief Secretary for Administration of Hong Kong (2007–2011); Tony Leung, a famous actor; Chua Lam, a well-known food critic; and Eason Chan, a celebrated singer. Tse Kee Restaurant helped make "Aberdeen Fish Balls Noodles Culture" (香港仔魚蛋粉) well-known.

Six Jau Laus (Cantonese restaurants, 酒樓) are located in the neighbourhood of Aberdeen. The noodles restaurants group Nam Kee (南記) started in Aberdeen in the early 1980s, promoting the "Aberdeen Fish Balls Noodles Culture" (香港仔魚蛋粉). The Nam Kee has two restaurants in Aberdeen, along with thirteen others in Hong Kong. There are several other Chinese noodles restaurants and various other restaurants located in Aberdeen Centre as well.

=== Festivals and events ===
Dragon boat race in Aberdeen Harbour

During the Tuen Ng Festival, also known as the Dragon Boat Festival, Aberdeen Harbour becomes the venue of the dragon boat race in the Southern District. District authorities also hold similar races on Duanwu Festival Day in harbours or rivers of their districts. Although the Aberdeen Harbour race is not as famous as the Shing Mun River race, it still attracts many tourists and locals every year.

The Southern District Tourism and Culture Festival, held by the Southern District Council, organizes races in the Aberdeen Promenade, tours of Aberdeen town, and the Mid-Autumn Fire Dragon Festival in the Aberdeen area every year.

Aberdeen Square, located in Aberdeen Centre, is a frequent venue for local organisations' events, including fairs, promotion events and charity events. The square is sometimes used by the Southern District Council to hold fairs and evening concerts during festivals such as the Chinese New Year and Christmas.

=== Tourism ===
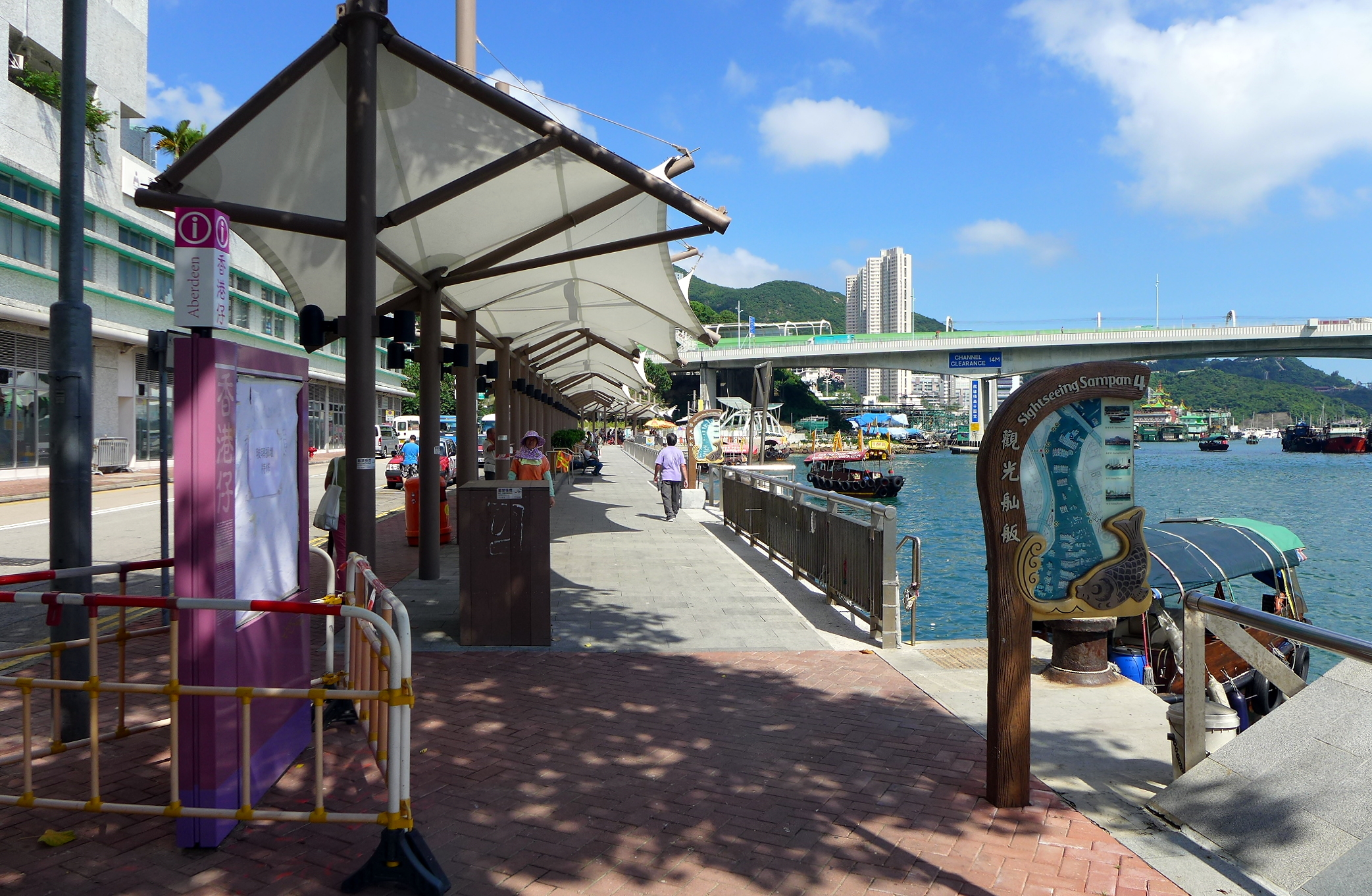
The view of Sampan Pier near Aberdeen Harbour

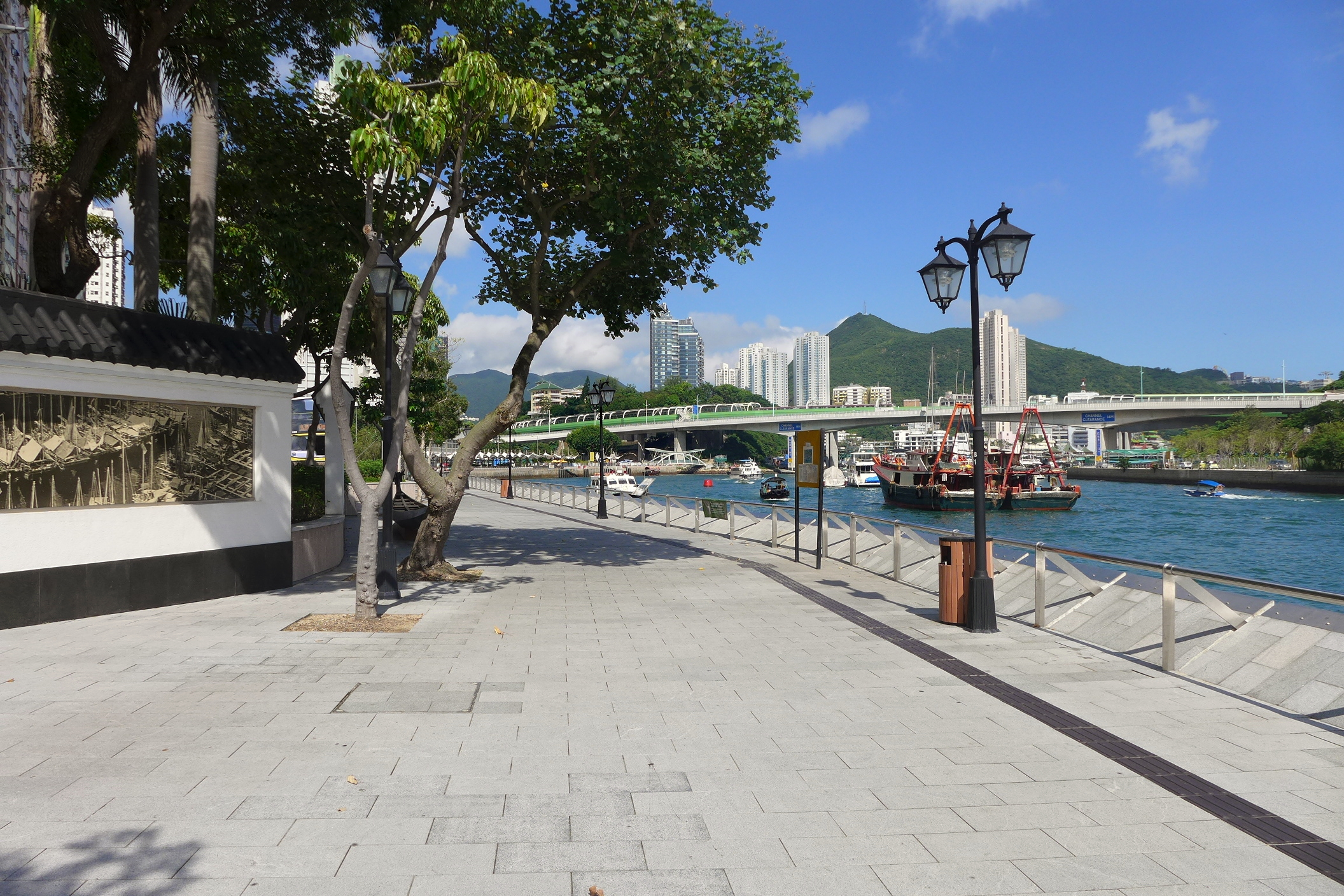
Aberdeen Promenade

Aberdeen Promenade, located right next to Aberdeen Harbour on the Aberdeen town side, as well as the Ap Lei Chau Bridge and Aberdeen Channel Bridge, are famous places for tourists to take photographs of Aberdeen Harbour. The two areas attract many tourists.

The route of Big Bus Tours Hong Kong includes Aberdeen Praya Road, where tourists can take photographs of Aberdeen Harbour on open-top buses.

Sampans (junks) can be hired by tourists for a tour of Aberdeen Harbour.

Aberdeen attracts many tourists as it is in the vicinity of Ocean Park, also located in the Southern District, near the Aberdeen Sports Ground, which is the other famous theme park apart from Hong Kong Disneyland.

== Infrastructure ==
=== Hotels ===
Mojo Nomad Aberdeen is located at 100 Shek Pai Wan Road, and has 52 rooms. The L'hotel Island South, at 55 Wong Chuk Hang Road, is located near the popular Ocean Park.

=== Hospitals ===
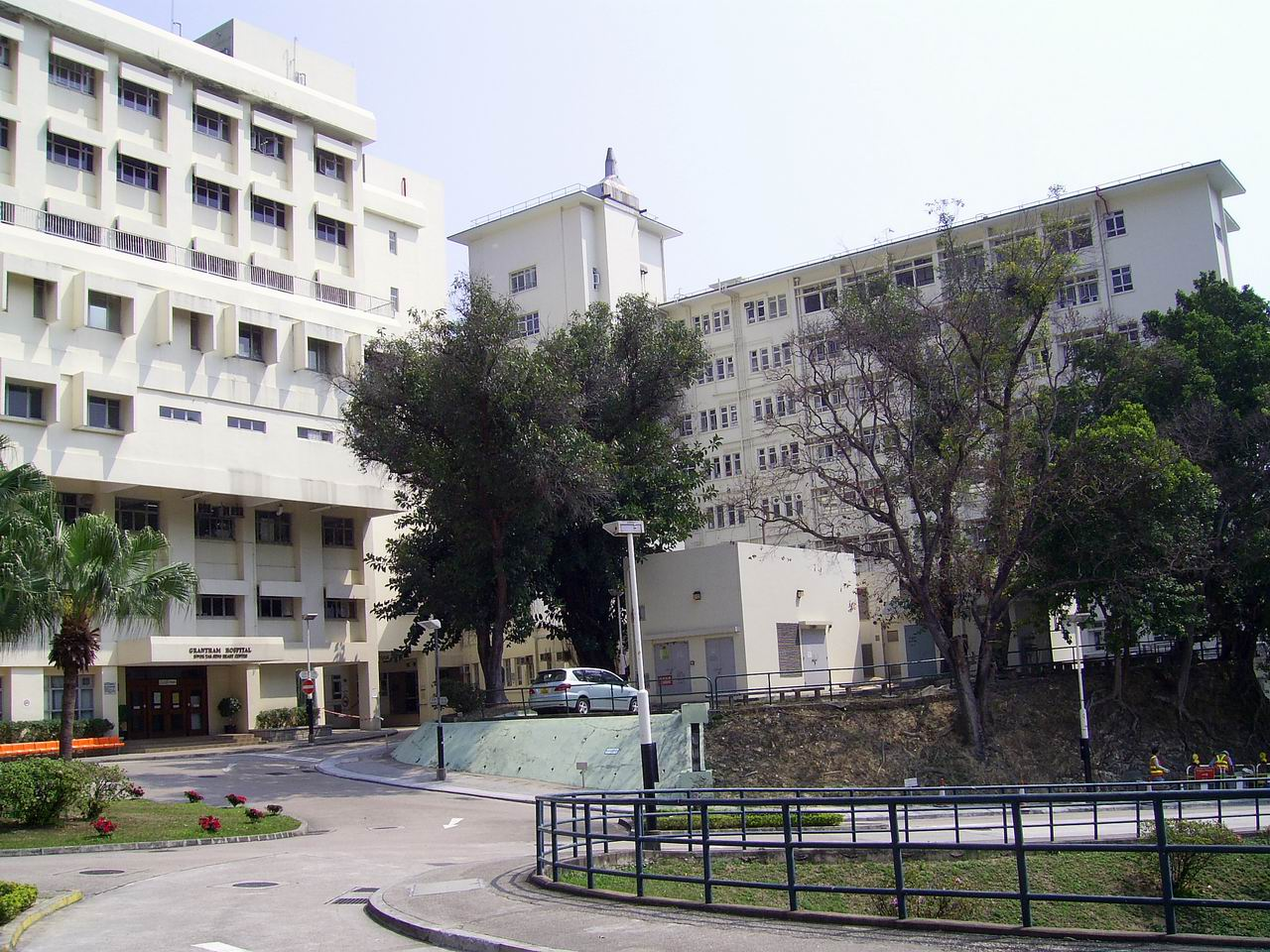
Grantham Hospital

Grantham Hospital, located at 125 Wong Chuk Hang Road, has been serving the citizens of the Southern District for more than half a century along with Queen Mary Hospital (also located near Aberdeen). Grantham Hospital specializes in comprehensive medical treatment for adult heart and lung diseases, as well as acute geriatrics and palliative medicine services. Gleneagles Hospital Hong Kong, a private hospital at 1 Nam Fung Path, opened in 2017.

== Economy ==
The head office of Wen Wei Po is in the Hing Wai Centre (興偉中心) in Aberdeen.

== Education ==
Canadian International School of Hong Kong, Singapore International School and Victoria Shanghai Academy are all located on Nam Long Shan. Both Canadian International School and Victoria Shanghai Academy are International Baccalaureate World Schools, and run all three educational programs of the IB. The International Montessori School is located on Ap Lei Chau near Aberdeen. South Island School is located nearby on Hong Kong Island.

Local Chinese high schools in Aberdeen district include Pui Tak Canossian College, St. Peter's Secondary School in Aberdeen Centre, Aberdeen Technical School in Wong Chuk Hang and Aberdeen Baptist Lui Ming Choi College in Ap Lei Chau.

Aberdeen is in Primary One Admission (POA) School Net 18. Within the school net are multiple aided schools (operated independently but funded with government money) and Hong Kong Southern District Government Primary School (香港南區官立小學).

Hong Kong Public Library operates the Aberdeen Public Library in the Aberdeen Municipal Services Building.

== Transport ==
To arrive at Aberdeen or Aberdeen Harbour, travellers can take buses 4, 7, 37A, 37B, 37X, 38, 40P, 41A, 42, 42C, 48, 70, 70P, 71, 71P, 72, 73, 73P, 77, 77X, 78, 91, 91A, 93, 93A, 93C, 94A, 95C, 98, 107, 107P, 170, 595, 970X, 971, 973, A10, N72 or N170, and alight at the bus stop "Aberdeen Promenade, Aberdeen Praya Road". This bus stop is located directly beside Aberdeen Harbour.

Aberdeen is served by Pok Fu Lam Road, Aberdeen Tunnel and Nam Fung Road through Wong Chuk Hang. Nam Fung Road connects Deep Water Bay Road, which also connects Wong Nai Chung Gap Road to Happy Valley. A bridge called Ap Lei Chau Bridge links Aberdeen with Ap Lei Chau over Aberdeen Harbour.

Aberdeen station, of the proposed South Island line West Section of the MTR will be in Aberdeen. Currently the closest station is Wong Chuk Hang on the South Island line, where feeder bus and minibus routes to Aberdeen are available.

Rail passengers may also reach Aberdeen by using kai-to ferry from Main Street, Ap Lei Chau near Lei Tung station (Exit A1). In addition to the Ap Lei Chau route, regular ferries also depart from Aberdeen to Yung Shue Wan and Sok Kwu Wan on Lamma Island, and Po Toi Island.

Transport to and from the boats in the harbour is usually provided by sampans. These can also be hired to Lamma Island.

== Recreation ==
=== Sports ===
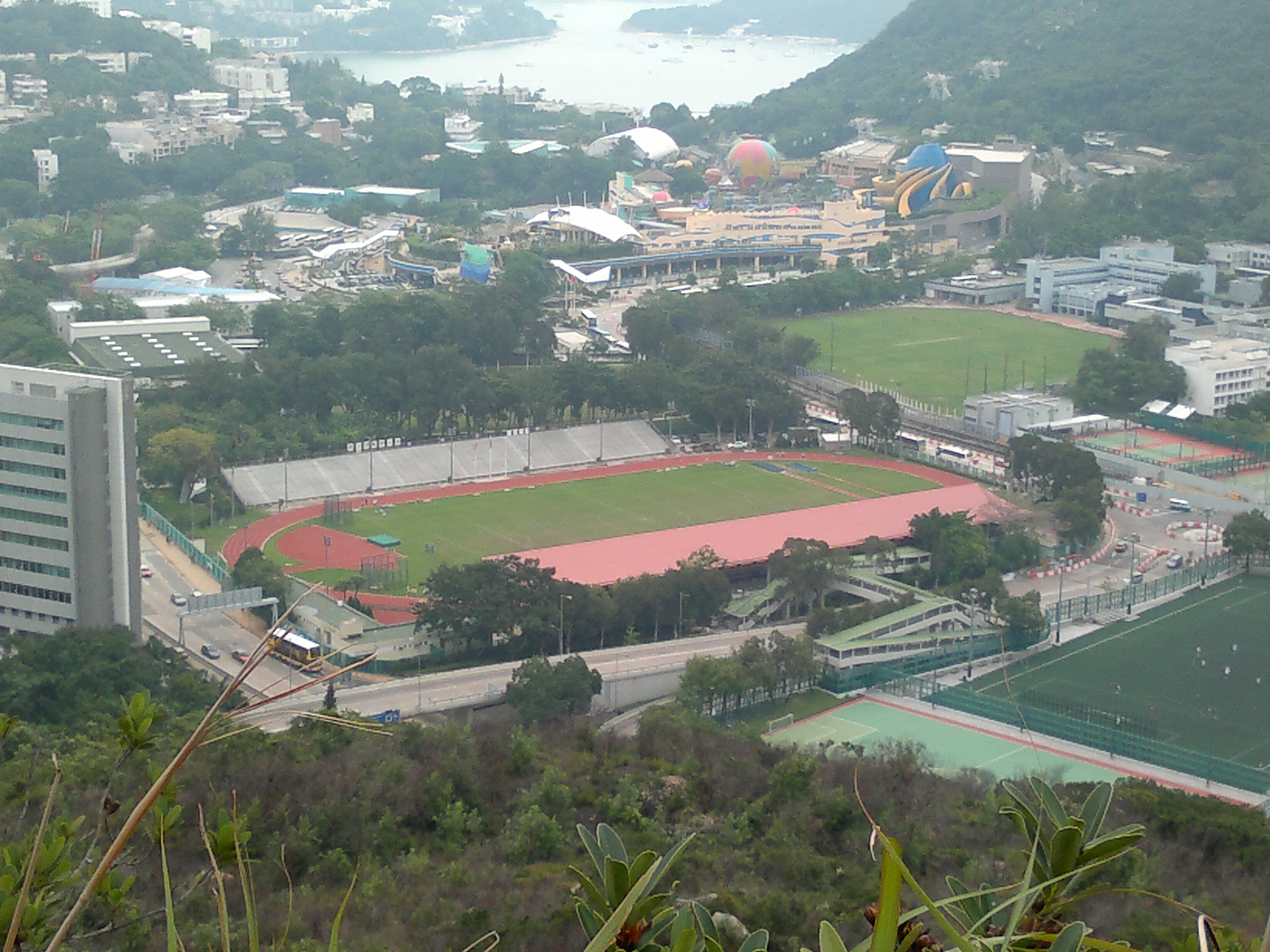
Aberdeen Sports Ground

Aberdeen Sports Ground is a major sports and events venue in the Southern District. It is usually an annual School Sports Day venue for many local primary and secondary schools in the Southern District. It is also the usual venue of the 30-Hour Famine held by World Vision Hong Kong. The Aberdeen Sports Ground is the home ground of the district's football team, Southern District RSA.

The Aberdeen Sports Centre is located on the 5/F and 6/F of the Aberdeen Municipal Services Building, No. 203 Aberdeen Main Road. The Aberdeen Sports Centre includes a multi-purpose arena, which can be converted into one basketball court or one volleyball court or four badminton courts. There is also a squash court, which can be converted into a table tennis room or a multi-purpose activity room.

The Aberdeen Tennis and Squash Centre is located at No. 1 Aberdeen Praya Road, next to the Ocean Court Building. The Aberdeen Tennis and Squash Centre includes 8 tennis courts and six squash courts, which can be converted into table tennis rooms or multi-purpose activity rooms, two American pool rooms, a fitness room, a fee-paying car park, and a first-aid room. Unlike private clubs, the facilities at the Aberdeen Sports Centre and the Aberdeen Tennis and Squash Centre can be reserved by Hong Kong Identity Card holders, locals or foreigners. The price is usually less than HKD $100.

The Aberdeen Sports Ground is open to the public free of charge whenever the Southern District RSA football team is not undergoing training.

=== Parks ===
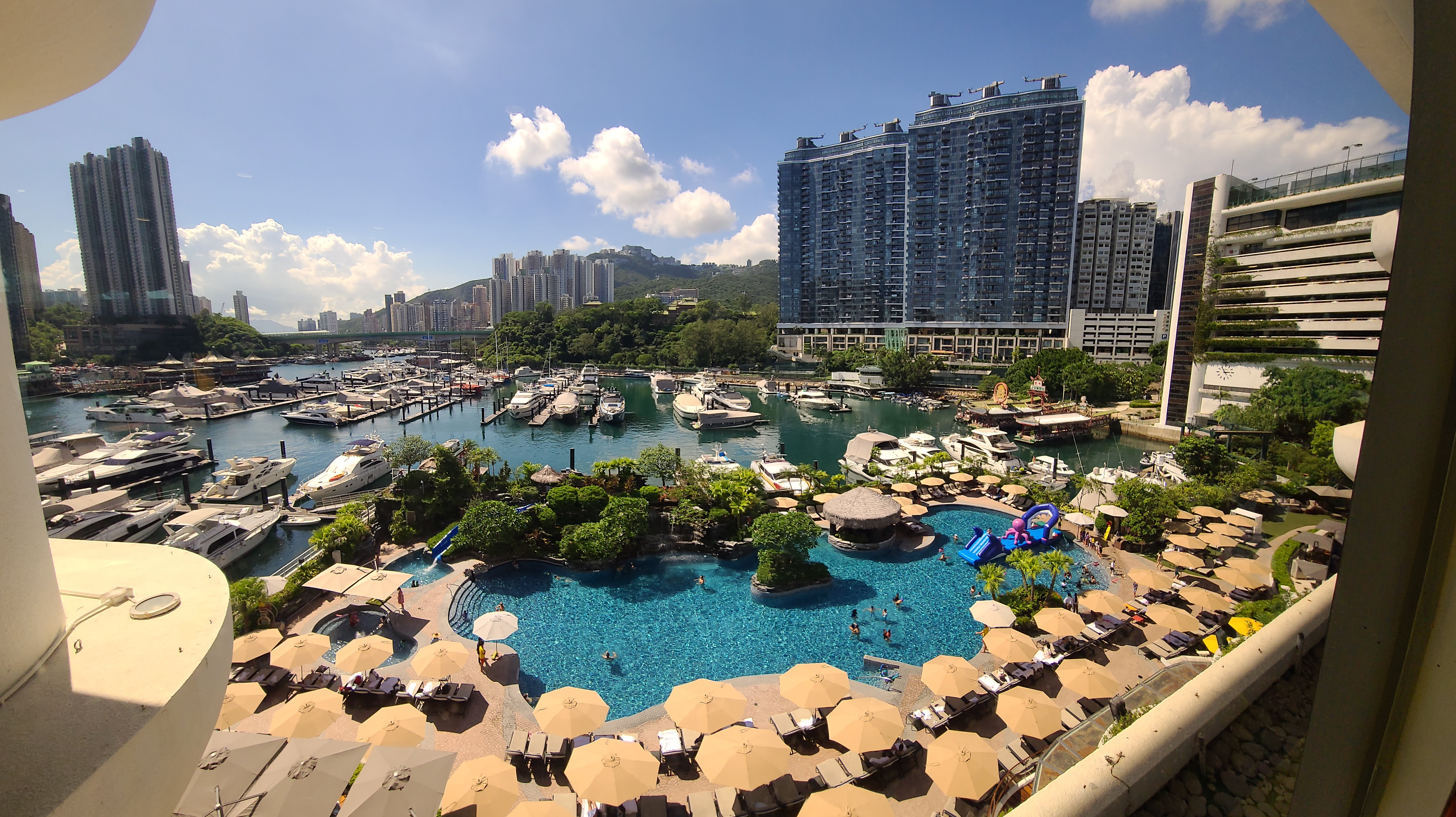
Aberdeen Marina Club

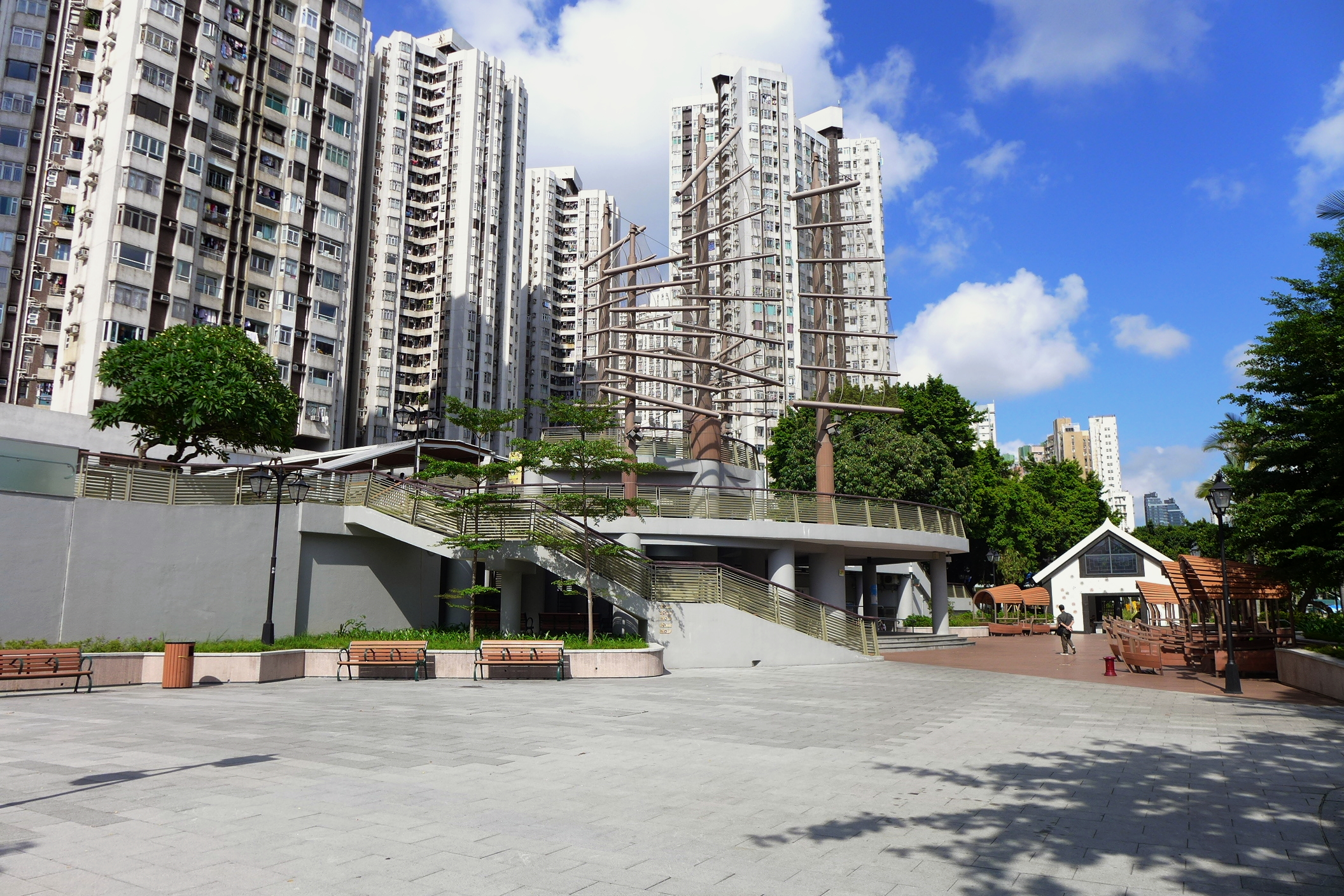
Viewing deck of Aberdeen Promenade

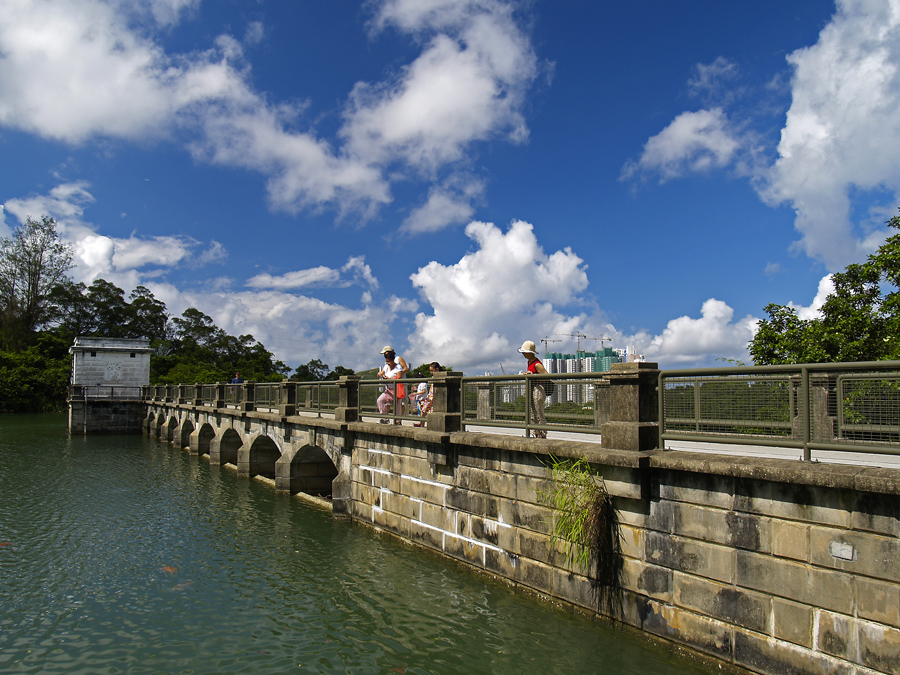
Aberdeen Reservoirs

Aberdeen Country Park (香港仔郊野公園), commonly known by locals as "Aberdeen Reservoir Park" (香港仔水塘公園), is surrounded by the Aberdeen Reservoirs (upper reservoir and lower reservoir). It is a popular spot for local citizens to have barbecue meals as well as a frequent spot for local social organisations and churches to hold group activities. It is also the usual venue of the annual Fall Picnic Day held by primary and secondary schools in the neighbourhood.

The Aberdeen Promenade (on the Aberdeen side) and the Ap Lei Chau Wind Tower Park (on the Ap Lei Chau side), located at both sides of the Aberdeen Harbour, are popular spots where local citizens jog and exercise. The two spots are more frequently used between 7 pm and 11 pm, as citizens exercise after work.

The Aberdeen Marina Club, located in Wong Chuk Hang (an area inside Aberdeen), provides ice hockey, ice skating, yoga, Tai Chi, swimming, Judo and other experiences for members.

== In popular culture ==
In 1973, the Hollywood martial arts film Enter the Dragon, starring Bruce Lee, used Aberdeen Harbour as a filming location for the scenes where the principal characters assemble on Han's junk for the sea journey to his island.

In 1987, Aberdeen harbour appears in multiple shots in the TV miniseries of James Clavell's Novel, "The Noble House", starring Pierce Brosnan. Brosnan's character travels to and meets with a Chinese triad leader, "Four Finger Wu" on his junk in the harbour. The two discuss kidnappings, lines of credit, and call ancient favours and debts.

In 1991, the American action film Double Impact, starring Jean-Claude Van Damme, includes an escape scene that was shot on the fishing vessels in Aberdeen Harbour, in which Van Damme swims to another fishing vessel in Aberdeen Harbour and ultimately escapes.

In 1996, the Hong Kong comedy movie The God of Cookery starred Steven Chow as the "Former God of Cookery" competing with Vincent Kok as the "New God of Cookery" on the Tai Pak floating restaurant, located in the Aberdeen Harbour.

Aberdeen Harbour is featured as the first area of the Dreamcast and Xbox video game Shenmue II. The "Aberdeen" depicted in the game differs radically in appearance from its real-life counterpart, being dominated architecturally by low-rise freight storage facilities and colonial-looking neo-historical architecture; this fictional version also faces an urban landscape slightly reminiscent of Hong Kong Island's north shore, an impossible arrangement due to Aberdeen being situated south of this area, behind a mountain range. The series' anime adaptation depicts Aberdeen similarly.

In 2003, the Hollywood movie Lara Croft: Tomb Raider – The Cradle of Life showed Angelina Jolie (Lara) in the Aberdeen Harbour on a floating houseboat using the Chinese family's satellite to communicate. This was mirrored to some extent in the 2018 reboot Tomb Raider (film), where an action scene was filmed in/around the fishing village of Aberdeen Harbour.

In 2010, the American reality television show The Amazing Race 17 (Leg 10) featured the Aberdeen Harbour as the location of a Detour task, where competitors searched for the right boat in the dark with a torch. In 2011, the Australian reality television show The Amazing Race Australia 1 (Leg 3) featured the Jumbo Kingdom floating restaurant as one of the additional tasks' venue, where competitors needed to search for a hidden message inside fortune cookies.

In the 2012 video game Sleeping Dogs, Aberdeen is featured as one of the districts of Hong Kong that can be explored.

The Aberdeen Harbour has also appeared in movies such as Jackie Chan's The Protector (1985) and another Hong Kong movie, Infernal Affairs II (2003).

Aberdeen has occasionally appeared in TVB's (a local television station) Food and Travel programs such as Master So Food and Neighborhood Gourmet 2, as Aberdeen is known throughout Hong Kong for its food culture.

== See also ==
- List of harbours in Hong Kong
- List of places in Hong Kong
- Central Ordnance Munitions Depot
