= List of harbours in Hong Kong =

The following is a list of (natural) harbours in Hong Kong:

- Victoria Harbour (維多利亞港, 維港)
- Aberdeen Harbour (香港仔海港)
- Double Haven (印洲塘)
- Port Shelter (牛尾海)
- Inner Port Shelter (西貢海)
- Tolo Harbour (吐露港)
- Tai Tam Harbour (大潭港)
- Rocky Harbour (糧船灣海)
- Three Fathoms Cove (企嶺下海)

== See also ==
- List of places in Hong Kong
