= Aberdeen Typhoon Shelters =

Typhoon shelters in Hong Kong

Coordinates: 22.246025°N 114.153693°E

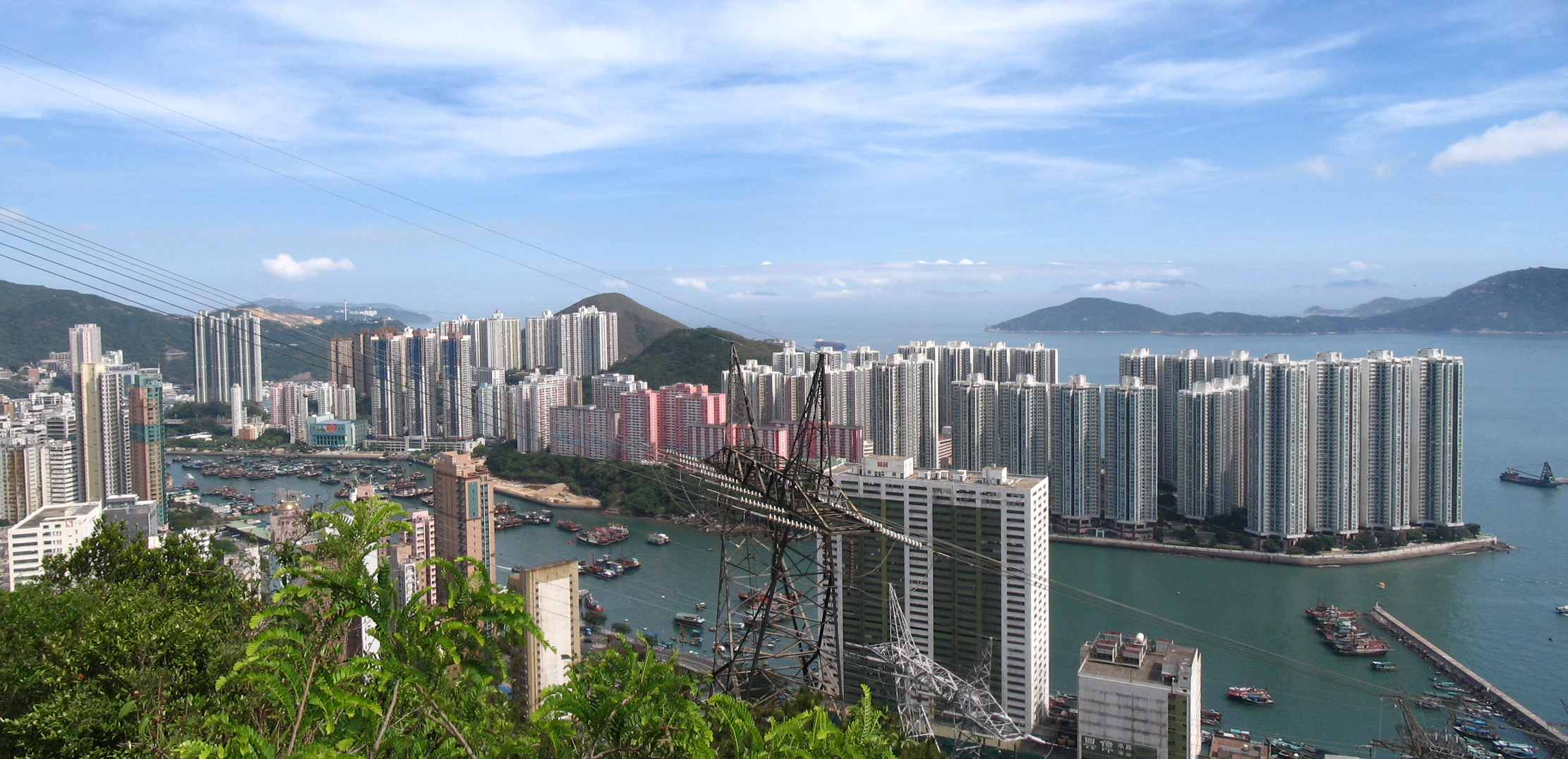
Aberdeen West Typhoon Shelter (looking south).

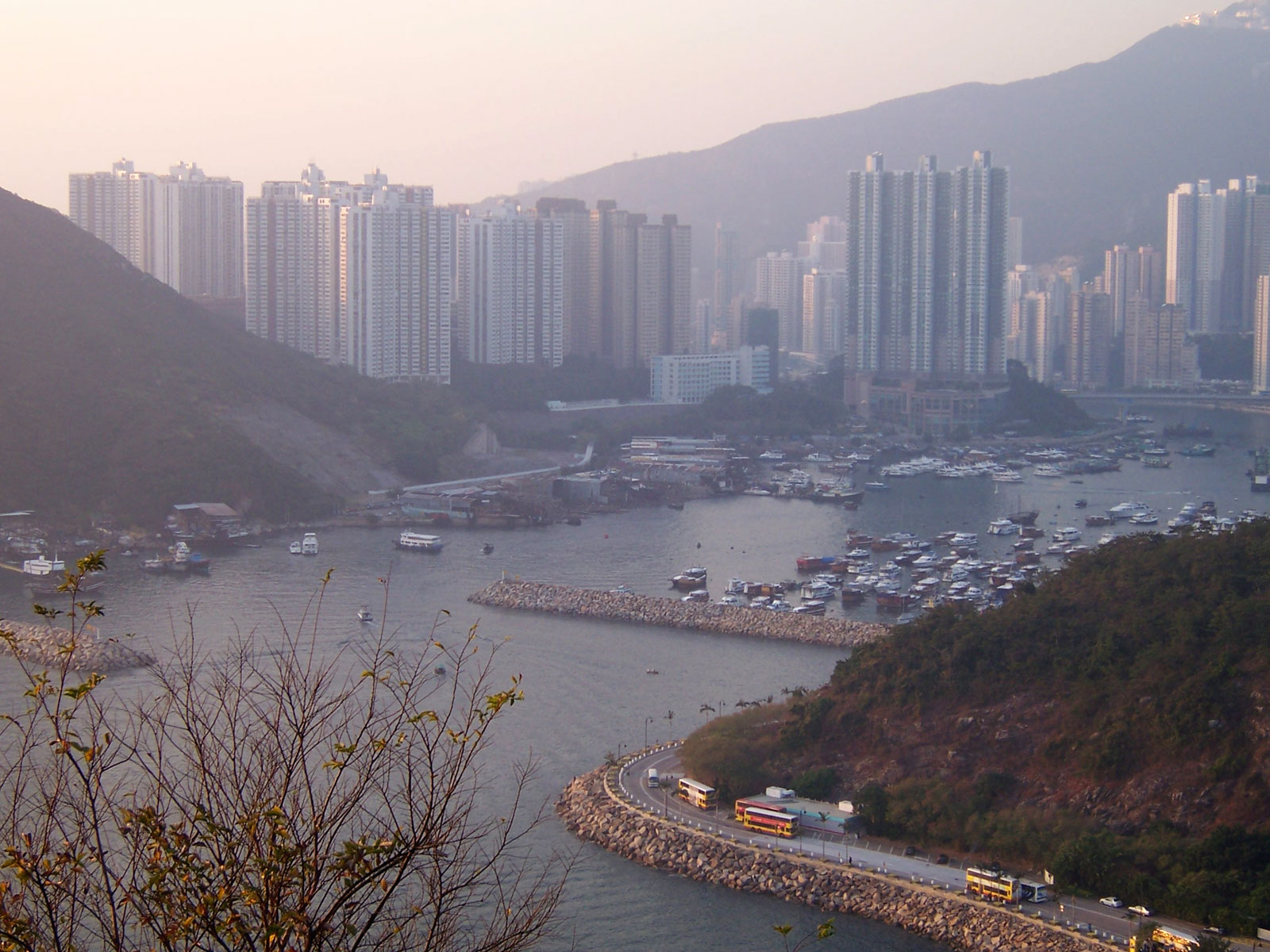
Aberdeen South Typhoon Shelter (looking north).

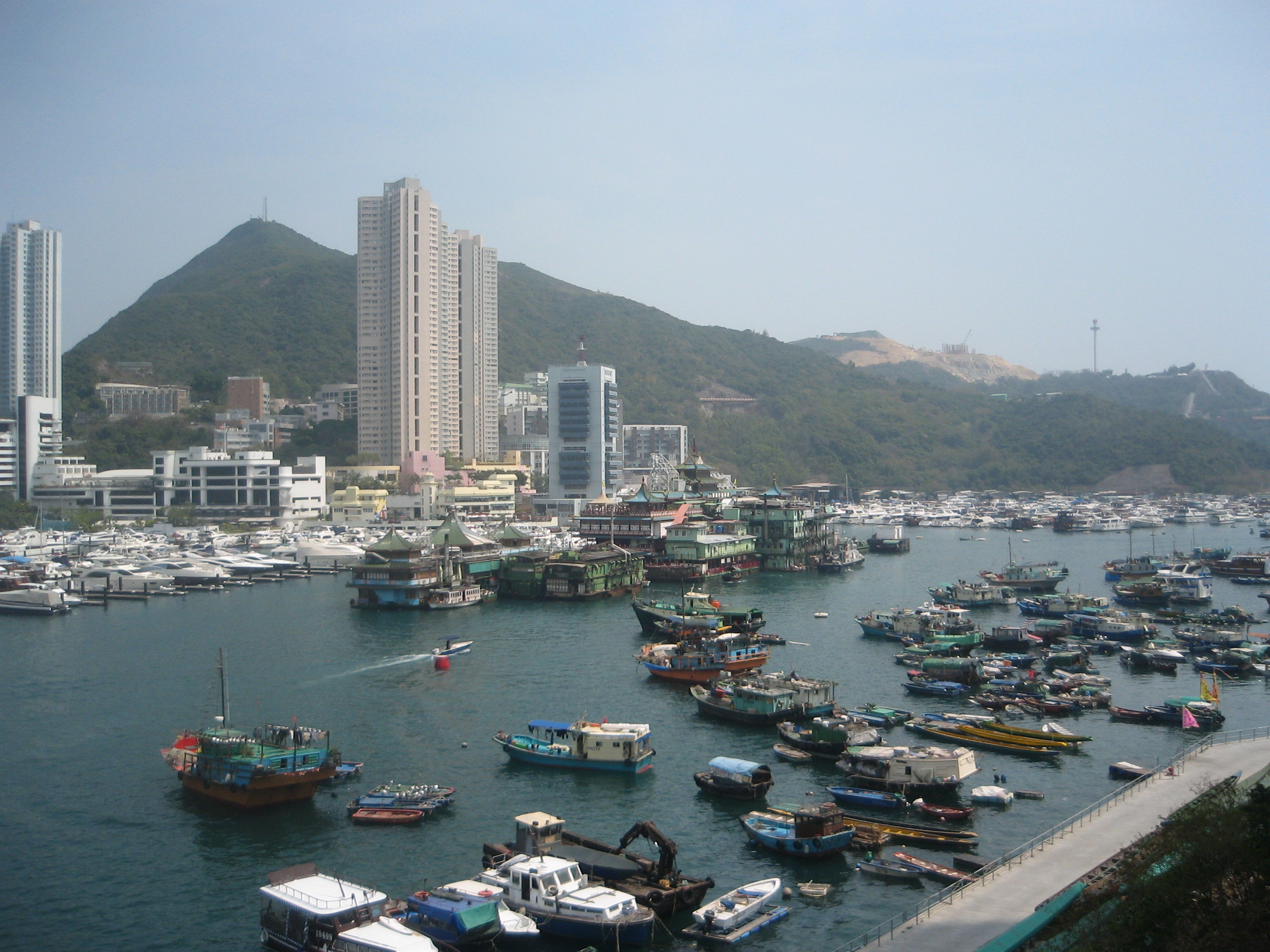
Aberdeen South Typhoon Shelter (looking south). The Jumbo Kingdom is visible in the centre.

The Aberdeen Typhoon Shelters of Hong Kong are Aberdeen West Typhoon Shelter (Chinese: 香港仔西避風塘) and Aberdeen South Typhoon Shelter (香港仔南避風塘). Both typhoon shelters are located in Southern District, between the southern part of Hong Kong Island and the island Ap Lei Chau. They are roughly separated by the Ap Lei Chau Bridge and Aberdeen Channel Bridge. The Aberdeen floating village is located within the shelters.

== History ==
The breakwaters for both typhoon shelters were completed in the 1960s.

== Aberdeen West Typhoon Shelter ==
Aberdeen West Typhoon Shelter is located between Aberdeen, which is on Hong Kong Island, and Ap Lei Chau. It includes Shek Pai Wan, also known as Aberdeen Bay.

== Aberdeen South Typhoon Shelter ==
Aberdeen South Typhoon Shelter is located between Wong Chuk Hang, on Hong Kong Island and Ap Lei Chau. It occupies a major portion of Aberdeen Channel. The bays of Sham Wan, which hosts the Aberdeen Marina, and Po Chong Wan are within the shelter. The Jumbo Kingdom floating restaurant was located within this shelter until 2022.

== See also ==
- List of typhoon shelters in Hong Kong
