= Ap Lei Chau Bridge =

Bridge in Aberdeen, Hong Kong

Ap Lei Chau Bridge 鴨脷洲大橋
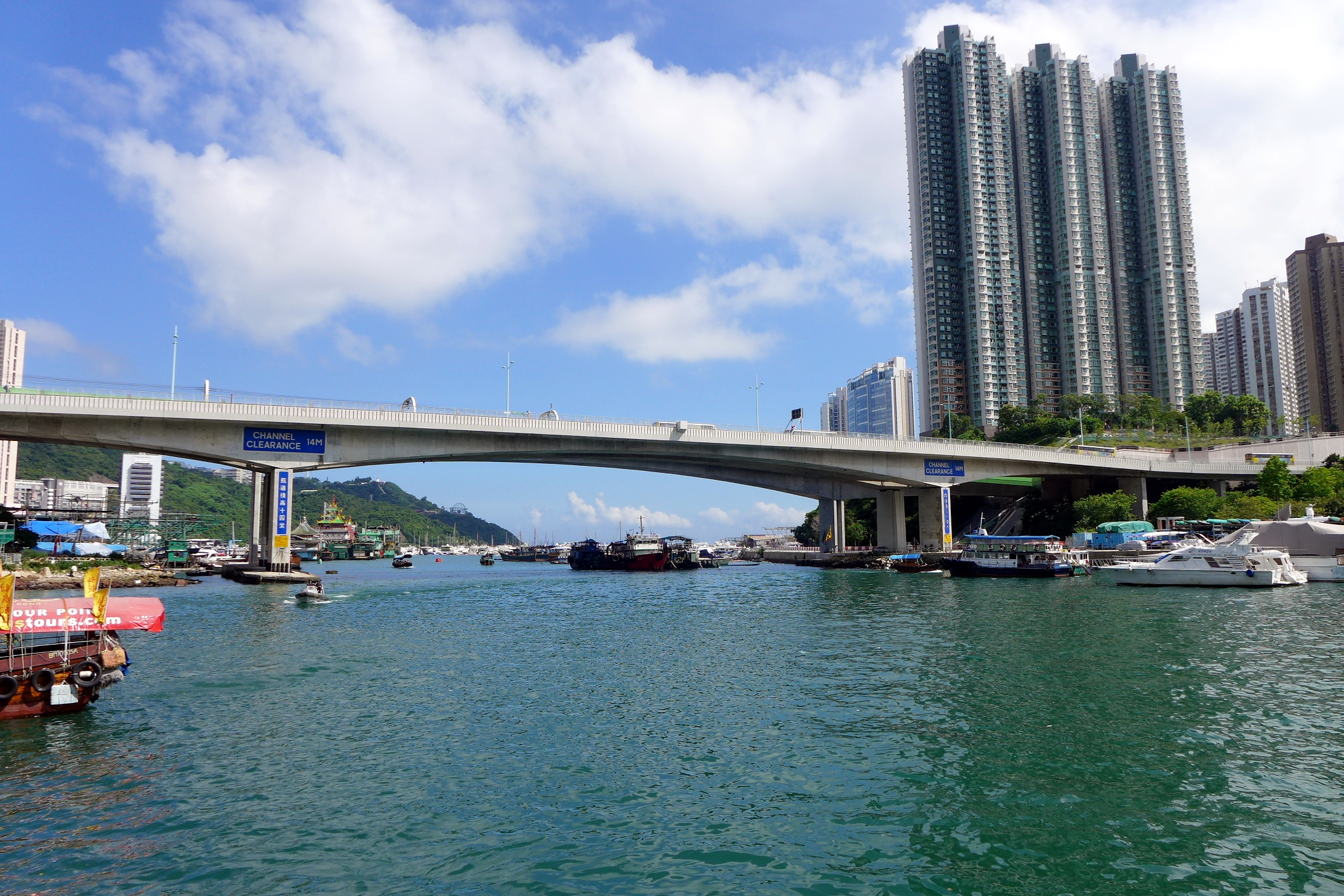
- Ap Lei Chau Bridge viewed from the north. Jumbo Kingdom is visible underneath the central span and Ocean Park in the distance.
- Coordinates: 22.245877°N 114.159704°E
- Carries: Vehicles, pedestrians
- Crosses: Aberdeen Channel
- Locale: Ap Lei Chau and Aberdeen, Hong Kong

Characteristics
- Design: Box girder bridge
- Total length: 230 m (750 ft)
- Clearance below: 14 m (46 ft)

History
- Construction start: 1977; 48 years ago (first bridge)
- Construction cost: HK$64,000,000
- Opened: 28 March 1980; 44 years ago (first bridge); 28 July 1994; 30 years ago (duplicate bridge)

Statistics
- Toll: Free of charge

Ap Lei Chau Bridge
- Traditional Chinese: 鴨脷洲大橋
Transcriptions
Yue: Cantonese
- Yale Romanization: Aap leih jāu daaih kìuh
- Jyutping: Aap3 lei6 zau1 daai6 kiu4

Ap Lei Chau Bridge is a highway bridge in Hong Kong connecting the island of Ap Lei Chau (Aberdeen Island) to the community of Aberdeen on Hong Kong Island.

== First bridge ==
Started in April 1977 and completed in 1980, the first bridge had one lane of traffic in each direction. It is a double-cantilever, prestressed-concrete bridge, with a 115 metres (377 ft) main span, two 60 metres (200 ft) side spans, and associated ramps. Maunsell & Partners were the bridge consultants.

Peter Hines was the resident engineer of the bridge. During the construction, he realised that the pre-stressed cantilevers of the bridge would not meet in the centre, necessitating an "emergency raise".

== Second bridge ==
Construction of the twin Second Ap Lei Chau Bridge on the north side of the first bridge was started in May 1991 and completed in July 1994 to provide two traffic lanes in each direction. Both sides of the bridge have pavements for pedestrian use.

Legislators approved funding for the Second Ap Lei Chau Bridge on 1 May 1991. It opened on 28 July 1994. The first person to drive across it was Kwong Hon-sang, Director of Highways, officiating at the opening ceremony.

The two bridges are Ap Lei Chau's only road links with Hong Kong Island. There is a railway bridge, the Aberdeen Channel Bridge, opened on 28 December 2016 as part of the MTR's South Island line.

== See also ==
- Aberdeen Typhoon Shelters
