= Fish Marketing Organisation =

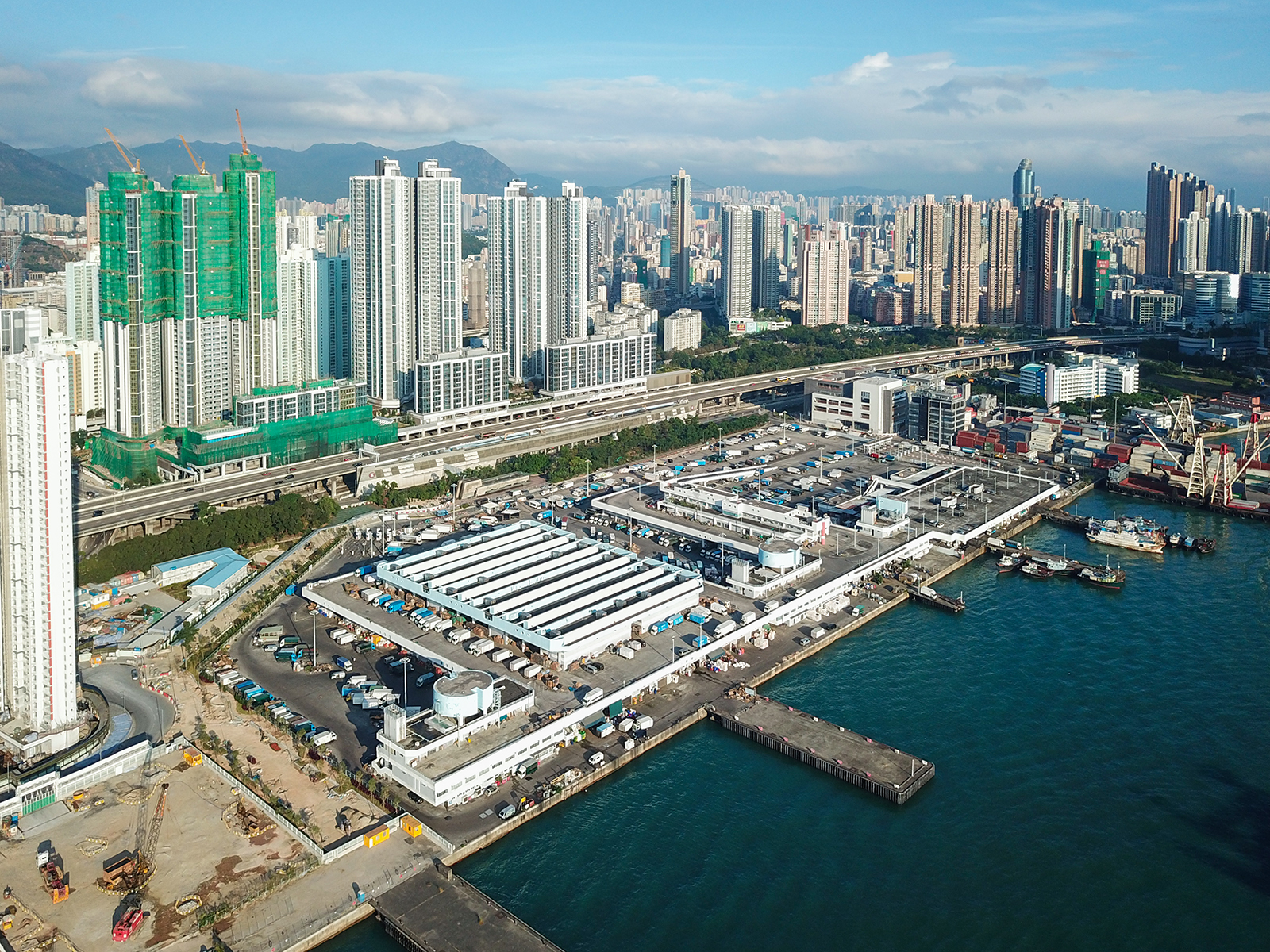
Cheung Sha Wan Wholesale Fish Market.

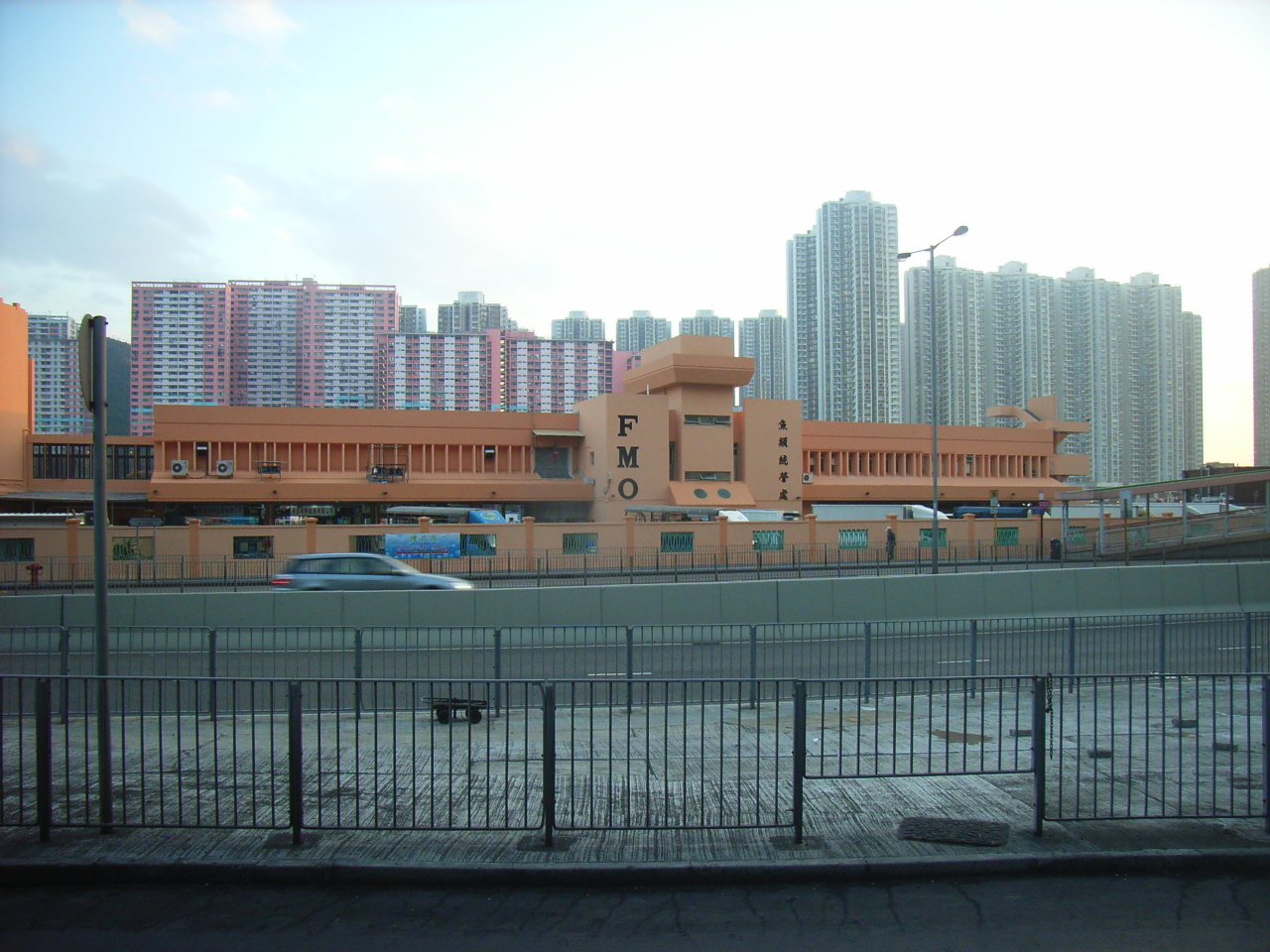
Aberdeen Wholesale Fish Market.

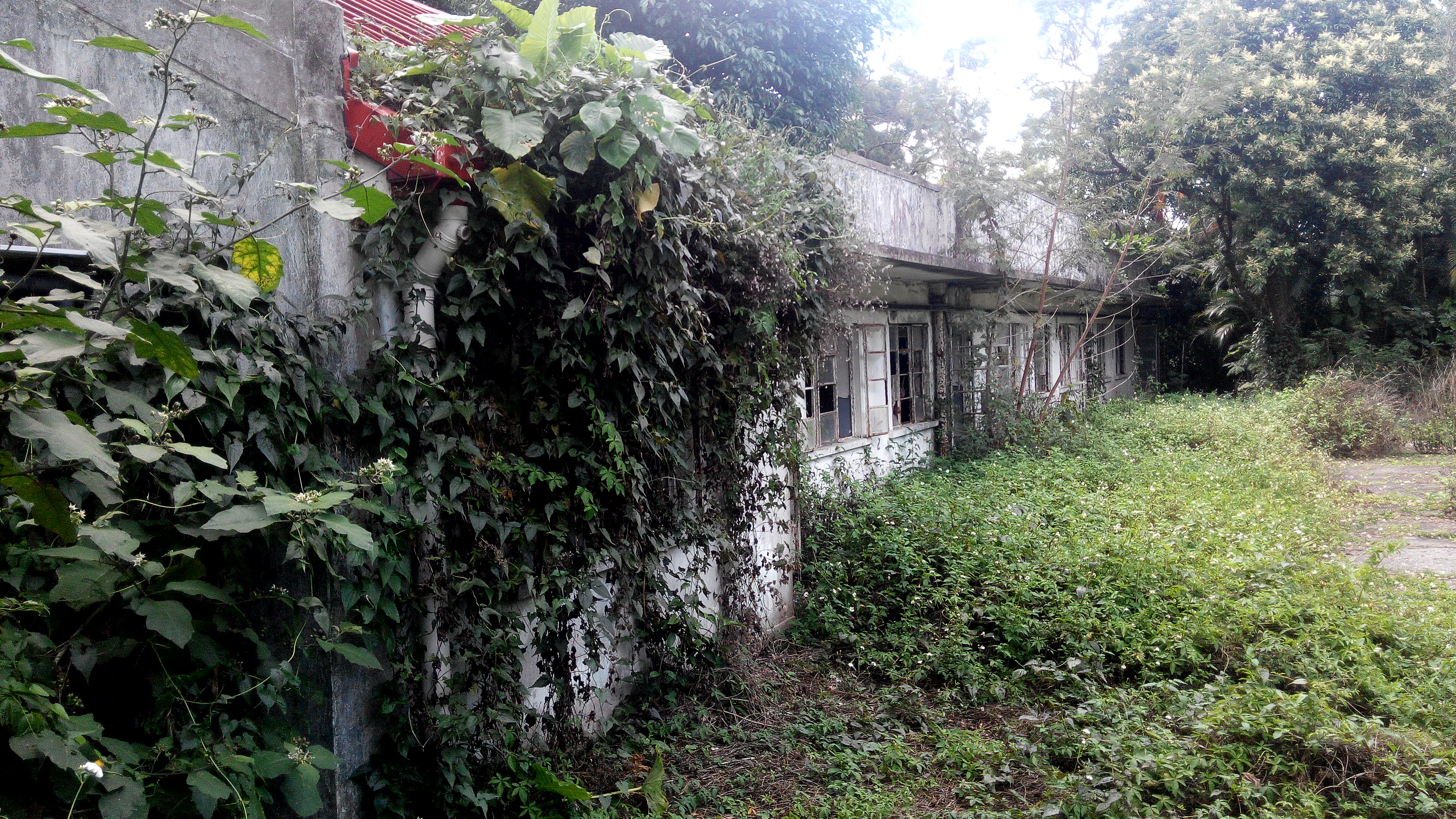
Former Fish Marketing Organization Sam Mun Tsai New Village Primary School (漁類統營處三門仔新村小學) on Yim Tin Tsai, Tai Po District.

The Fish Marketing Organisation (FMO, Chinese: 魚類統營處) is a statutory body of Hong Kong, administered by the Agriculture, Fisheries and Conservation Department.

The Fish Marketing Organisation was established as a self-financing non-profit-making organisation under the Marine Fish (Marketing) Ordinance, Cap 291 to provide wholesale marketing services through the operation of wholesale fish markets.

== Wholesale fish markets ==
The FMO operates seven wholesale fish markets in Aberdeen, Shau Kei Wan, Kwun Tong, Cheung Sha Wan, Castle Peak (Tuen Mun), Tai Po and Sai Kung.

== Schools ==
The Fish Marketing Organisation was historically also operating schools for the children of fishermen. The first such schools were established by the FMO in 1947 and 1948. By 1980, there were 15 such schools, mostly primary schools and one secondary school.

== See also ==
- Tsing Yi Fishermen's Children's Primary School
- Tanka people
