= Famine events =

Voluntary fasting to draw attention to famines

Famine events are localized events of voluntary fasting for 30 or 40 hours depending on the region to raise money and awareness for world hunger. These events are usually coordinated by one of various World Vision organizations and are done by youth in church organizations. They have spread internationally, notably the international 30 Hour Famine, also the regional 40 Hour Famine in Australia and New Zealand and the 24 Hour Famine in the United Kingdom. The 30 Hour Famine is the most popular amongst all, spreading across 21 countries.

== 30 Hour Famine ==

The 30 Hour Famine is a World Vision event in 21 countries. It started in 1971 when 17-year-old Ruth Roberts and 14 friends in Calgary, Alberta staged an event in a church basement to see what it was like to be hungry and raise money and awareness for children suffering during a famine. The funds raised went to World Vision.

David L. Wylie, a nondenominational youth leader, jump-started the movement in the United States about seventeen years ago as a youth director of Millen Baptist Church in South Georgia. He was looking for a way to stimulate the interest of his 25-member youth group in world hunger issues when he heard the idea of a voluntary hunger strike from World Vision. His group raised $3,000 that year, $5,000 the next and was featured on CNN Headline News and Wylie was nominated by Congressman Lindsey Thomas for a Presidential Point of Light Award. Wylie was also recognized by the Georgia House of Representatives, the Georgia Senate, and numerous Georgia governors for his efforts to get youth involved in hunger causes by using the 30-Hour Famine program.

Thousands of teenagers across the U.S., Canada, and several other countries (including Hong Kong, Taiwan, Malaysia, UK, Singapore and Australia and New Zealand) participate to raise money and then fast for 30 hours. However, individuals can raise money and fast by themselves.

During the event, for 30 hours, participants must abstain from eating food, and instead they typically drink water, fruit juices, or other liquids. Games, fundraisers, and other events may also take place to help teach and educate the participants and others about world hunger all over the world. It is also a time for education and awareness of world hunger, and an understanding of how people go without food for long periods of time. This, however, does not exclude those unable to fast.

== 40 Hour Famine – Australia ==
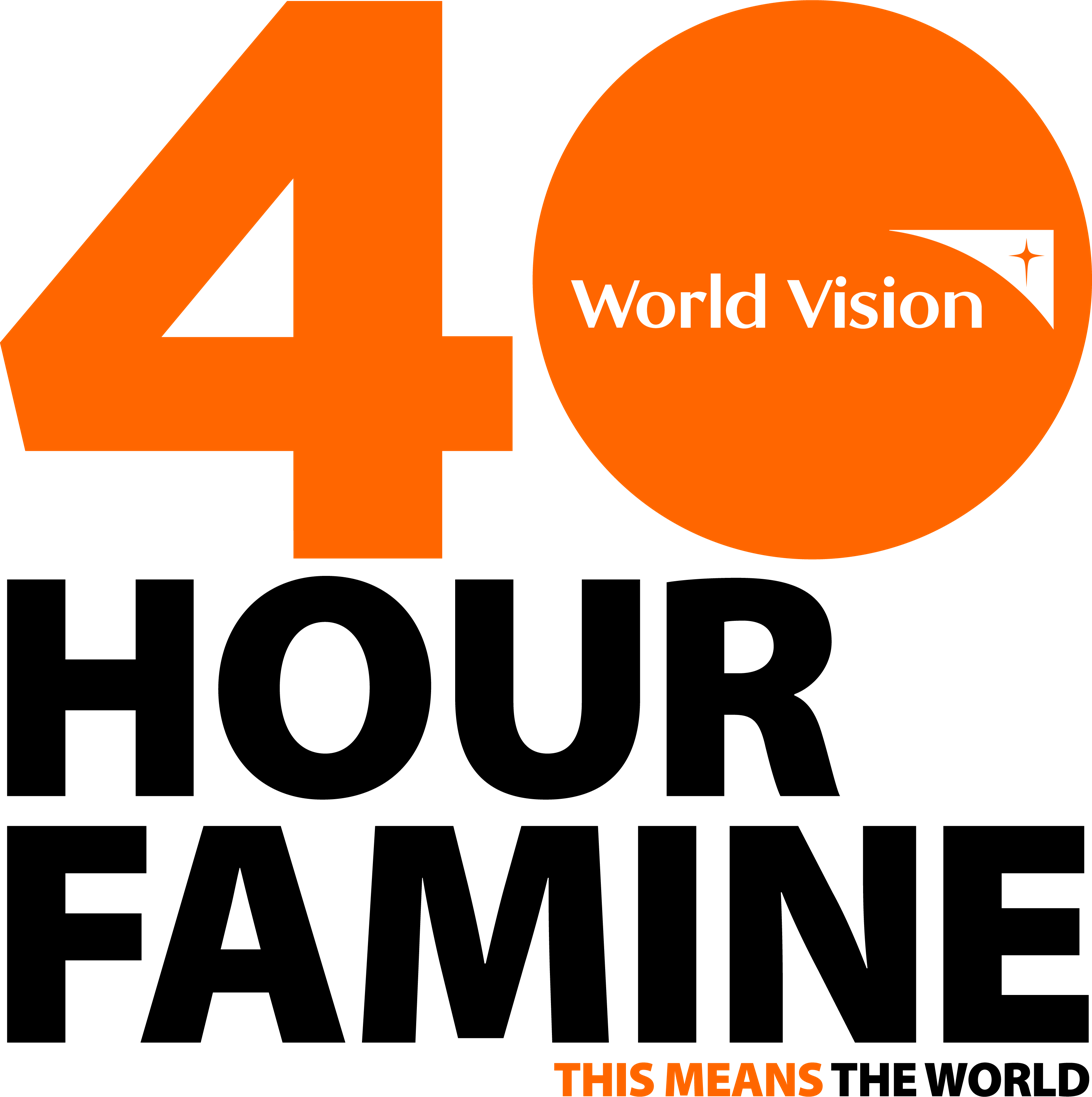
Current logo

The 40 Hour Famine is an annual charitable event held by World Vision Australia. The event aims for young Australians to feel empathy for millions of children and families around the world on the brink of famine and raise funds to help them. It was started in 1975 in response to the famine in Ethiopia.

Participants can choose their own challenge and either give up something like furniture or talking for 40 hours or do something creative eg. Walk for 40kms, do 40 acts of kindness. They can do this individually, or as a team, school or church.

The event officially runs from 8pm on Friday to noon on Sunday, usually over a weekend in August. Participants may choose another time to do their challenge if they wish.

== 40 Hour Challenge – New Zealand ==
The 40 Hour Challenge (previously known as the 40 Hour Famine), New Zealand's largest youth fundraiser, is an annual World Vision New Zealand campaign aimed at providing New Zealanders with a unique experience, as a catalyst for fundraising.

The 40 Hour Famine was launched in 1975 by World Vision. This first 40 Hour Famine, on 15–17 August 1975, had 10,000 participants and raised NZ$265,000.

Since then, the 40 Hour Famine has continued to grow, raising over $2.5 million through 118,000 participants. In 2021, the event was renamed to be the "40 Hour Challenge" as World Vision branched out to global issues beyond hunger. The 40 Hour Challenge, in many New Zealand schools and communities, has become an annual tradition.

== 24 Hour Famine ==
24 Hour Famine is also an annual charity event held by World Vision UK which started in 1986. The aim is to raise awareness and money for people stricken by famine around the world. Participants can choose to go without food for the duration, or other activities such as computer games or talking. In 2008, the official Cause was the 'nowhere children' in Chennai. Age restrictions apply: 0–13 years are only allowed to fast for 20 hours whilst 14+ years can fast for up to 40 hours.

== Notes ==
a: World Vision does not address the global famine events in one general term, but rather address them in regionally specific names. The 30 Hour Famine is the most popular and earliest event amongst all. Its popularity is especially high in East Asia countries and North America. The 40 Hour Famine is dedicated to Australia and New Zealand only, while the 24 Hour Famine is solely dedicated to the United Kingdom.
