= Aberdeen Promenade =

Waterfront park in Aberdeen, Hong Kong

- 香港仔海濱公園
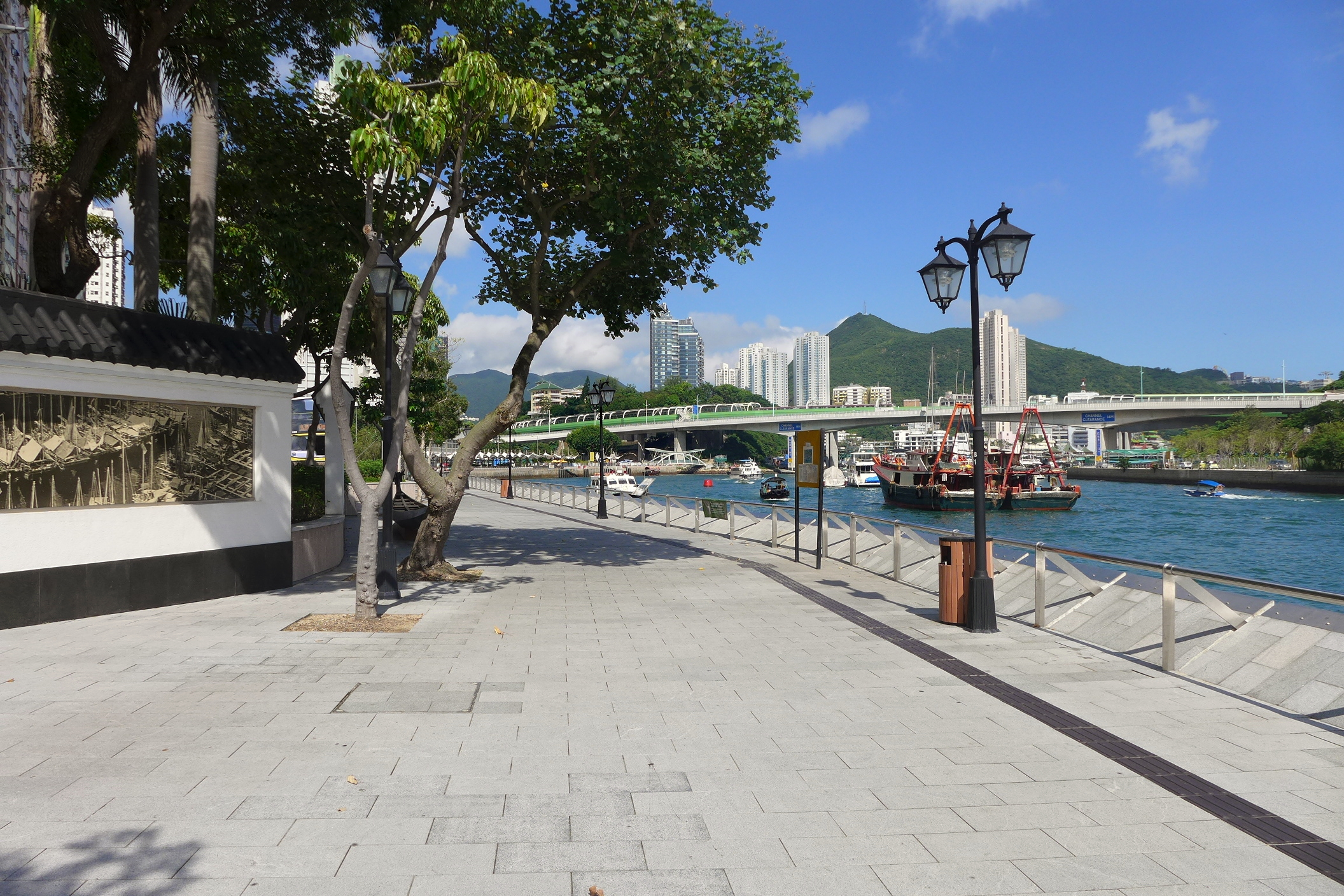
- Aberdeen Promenade
- Interactive map of Aberdeen Promenade
- Location: Aberdeen, Hong Kong Island
- Coordinates: 22.24730°N 114.15428°E
- Opened: 1992; 34 years ago
- Operator: Leisure and Cultural Services Department
- Open: Year round

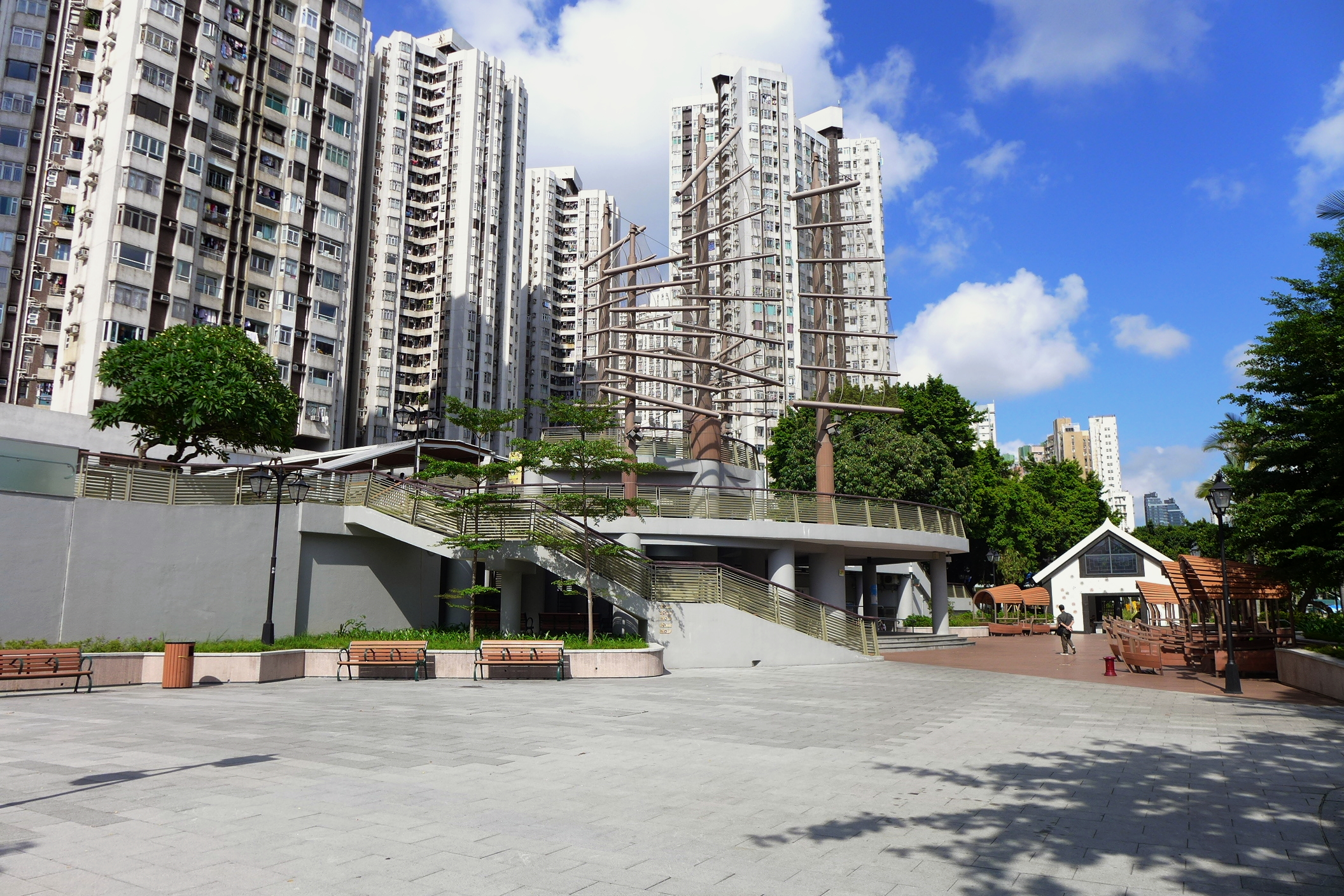
Viewing Deck

Aberdeen Promenade (Chinese: 香港仔海濱公園) is a small urban waterfront park in Aberdeen, Hong Kong. It is located on the north shore of Aberdeen Bay across from Aberdeen Island.

== See also ==
- List of urban public parks and gardens in Hong Kong
