= Sweden in the Eurovision Song Contest 2017 =

- Eurovision Song Contest 2017
- Participating broadcaster: Sveriges Television (SVT)
- Country: Sweden
- Selection process: Melodifestivalen 2017
- Selection date: 11 March 2017

Competing entry
- Song: "I Can't Go On"
- Artist: Robin Bengtsson
- Songwriters: David Kreuger; Hamed "K-One" Pirouzpanah; Robin Stjernberg

Placement
- Semi-final result: Qualified (3rd, 227 points)
- Final result: 5th, 344 points

Participation chronology

Sweden was represented at the Eurovision Song Contest 2017 with the song "I Can't Go On", written by David Kreuger, Hamed "K-One" Pirouzpanah, and Robin Stjernberg, and performed by Robin Bengtsson. The Swedish participating broadcaster, Sveriges Television (SVT), organised the national final Melodifestivalen 2017 in order to select its entry for the contest. After a six-week-long competition consisting of four heats, a Second Chance round and a final, "I Can't Go On" performed by Robin Bengtsson emerged as the winner after achieving the highest score following the combination of votes from eleven international jury groups and a public vote.

Sweden was drawn to compete in the first semi-final of the Eurovision Song Contest which took place on 9 May 2017. Performing as the opening entry for the show in position 1, "I Can't Go On" was announced among the top 10 entries of the first semi-final and therefore qualified to compete in the final on 13 May.

== Background ==
Prior to the 2017 contest, Sveriges Radio (SR) until 1979, and Sveriges Television (SVT) since 1980, had participated in the Eurovision Song Contest representing Sweden fifty-six times since SR's first entry in 1958. Sweden had won the contest on six occasions: in 1974 with the song "Waterloo" performed by ABBA, in 1984 with the song "Diggi-Loo Diggi-Ley" performed by Herreys, in 1991 with the song "Fångad av en stormvind" performed by Carola, in 1999 with the song "Take Me to Your Heaven" performed by Charlotte Nilsson, in 2012 with the song "Euphoria" performed by Loreen, and in 2015 with the song "Heroes" performed by Måns Zelmerlöw. Following the introduction of semi-finals for the 2004, Sweden's entries, to this point, have featured in every final except for 2010 when the nation failed to qualify.

As part of its duties as participating broadcaster, SVT organises the selection of its entry in the Eurovision Song Contest and broadcasts the event in the country. Since 1959, SR first and SVT later have organised the annual competition Melodifestivalen in order to select their entries for the contest.

== Before Eurovision ==
=== Melodifestivalen 2017 ===
Melodifestivalen 2017 is the Swedish music competition that selected Sweden's entry for the Eurovision Song Contest 2017. 28 songs competed in a six-week-long process which would consist of four heats on 4, 11, 18 and 25 February 2017, a second chance round on 4 March 2017, and a final on 11 March 2017. The six shows were hosted by Clara Henry, David Lindgren and Hasse Andersson. Seven songs competed in each heat—the top two qualified directly to the final, while the third and fourth placed songs qualified to the second chance round. The bottom three songs in each heat were eliminated from the competition. An additional four songs qualified to the final from the second chance round. The results in the heats and second chance round were determined exclusively by public televote and app voting, while the overall winner of the competition was selected in the final through the combination of a public vote and the votes from eleven international jury groups.

==== Heats and Second Chance round ====
- The first heat took place on 4 February 2017 at the Scandinavium in Gothenburg. "Hold On" performed by Nano and "Wild Child" performed by Ace Wilder qualified directly to the final, while "Her Kiss" performed by Boris René and "Road Trip" performed by De Vet Du advanced to the Second Chance round. "Amare" performed by Adrijana, "One More Night" performed by Dinah Nah, and "Mitt liv" performed by Charlotte Perrelli were eliminated from the contest.
- The second heat took place on 11 February 2017 at the Malmö Arena in Malmö. "A Million Years" performed by Mariette and "Good Lovin'" performed by Benjamin Ingrosso qualified directly to the final, while "I Don't Give A" performed by Lisa Ajax and "Hearts Aligned" performed by Dismissed advanced to the Second Chance round. "Himmel och hav" performed by Roger Pontare, "Up" performed by Etzia, and "Vart har du vart" performed by Allyawan were eliminated from the contest.
- The third heat took place on 18 February 2017 at the Vida Arena in Växjö. "I Can't Go On" performed by Robin Bengtsson and "Boogieman Blues" performed by Owe Thörnqvist qualified directly to the final, while "Gotta Thing About You" performed by FO&O and "Kiss You Goodbye" performed by Anton Hagman advanced to the Second Chance round. "Snurra min jord" performed by Krista Siegfrids, "Gravity" performed by Jasmine Kara, and "Crucified" performed by Bella and Filippa were eliminated from the contest.
- The fourth heat took place on 25 February 2017 at the Skellefteå Kraft Arena in Skellefteå. "As I Lay Me Down" performed by Wiktoria and "En värld full av strider (Eatneme gusnie jeenh dåaroeh)" performed by Jon Henrik Fjällgren feat. Aninia qualified directly to the final, while "Statements" performed by Loreen and "När ingen ser" performed by Axel Schylström advanced to the Second Chance round. "Running with Lions" performed by Alice Svensson, "Bound to Fall" performed by Les Gordons, and "Du får inte ändra på mig" performed by Sara Varga and Juha Mulari were eliminated from the contest.
- The Second Chance round (Andra chansen) took place on 4 March 2017 at the Saab Arena in Linköping. "Gotta Thing About You" performed by FO&O, "I Don't Give A" performed by Lisa Ajax, "Her Kiss" performed by Boris René and "Kiss You Goodbye" performed by Anton Hagman qualified for the final.

==== Final ====
The final was held on 11 March 2017 at the Friends Arena in Stockholm. Twelve songs competed - two qualifiers from each of the four preceding heats and four qualifiers from the Second Chance round. The combination of points from a viewer vote and eleven international jury groups determined the winner. The viewers and the juries each had a total of 473 points to award. The nations that comprised the international jury were Armenia, Australia, Czech Republic, France, Israel, Italy, Malta, Norway, Poland, the United Kingdom and Ukraine. Robin Bengtsson emerged as the winner of the national selection with his song "I Can't Go On".

R/O	Artist	Song	Juries	Public	Total	Place
1	Ace Wilder	"Wild Child"	35	32	67	7
2	Boris René	"Her Kiss"	35	31	66	8
3	Lisa Ajax	"I Don't Give A"	16	30	46	9
4	Robin Bengtsson	"I Can't Go On"	96	50	146	1
5	Jon Henrik Fjällgren feat. Aninia	"En värld full av strider (Eatneme gusnie jeenh dåaroeh)"	56	49	105	3
6	Anton Hagman	"Kiss You Goodbye"	6	37	43	10
7	Mariette	"A Million Years"	62	37	99	4
8	FO&O	"Gotta Thing About You"	7	34	41	11
9	Nano	"Hold On"	76	57	133	2
10	Wiktoria	"As I Lay Me Down"	29	51	80	6
11	Benjamin Ingrosso	"Good Lovin'"	54	33	87	5
12	Owe Thörnqvist	"Boogieman Blues"	1	32	33	12

=== Promotion ===
Robin Bengtsson made several appearances across Europe to specifically promote "I Can't Go On" as the Swedish Eurovision entry. On 2 April, he performed during the London Eurovision Party, which was held at the Café de Paris venue in London, United Kingdom and hosted by Nicki French. Between 3 and 6 April, Bengtsson took part in promotional activities in Tel Aviv, Israel where he performed during the Israel Calling event held at the Ha'teatron venue. On 8 April, Robin Bengtsson performed during the Eurovision in Concert event which was held at the Melkweg venue in Amsterdam, Netherlands and hosted by Cornald Maas and Selma Björnsdóttir. On 15 April, Bengtsson performed during the Eurovision Spain Pre-Party, which was held at the Sala La Riviera venue in Madrid, Spain.

== At Eurovision ==
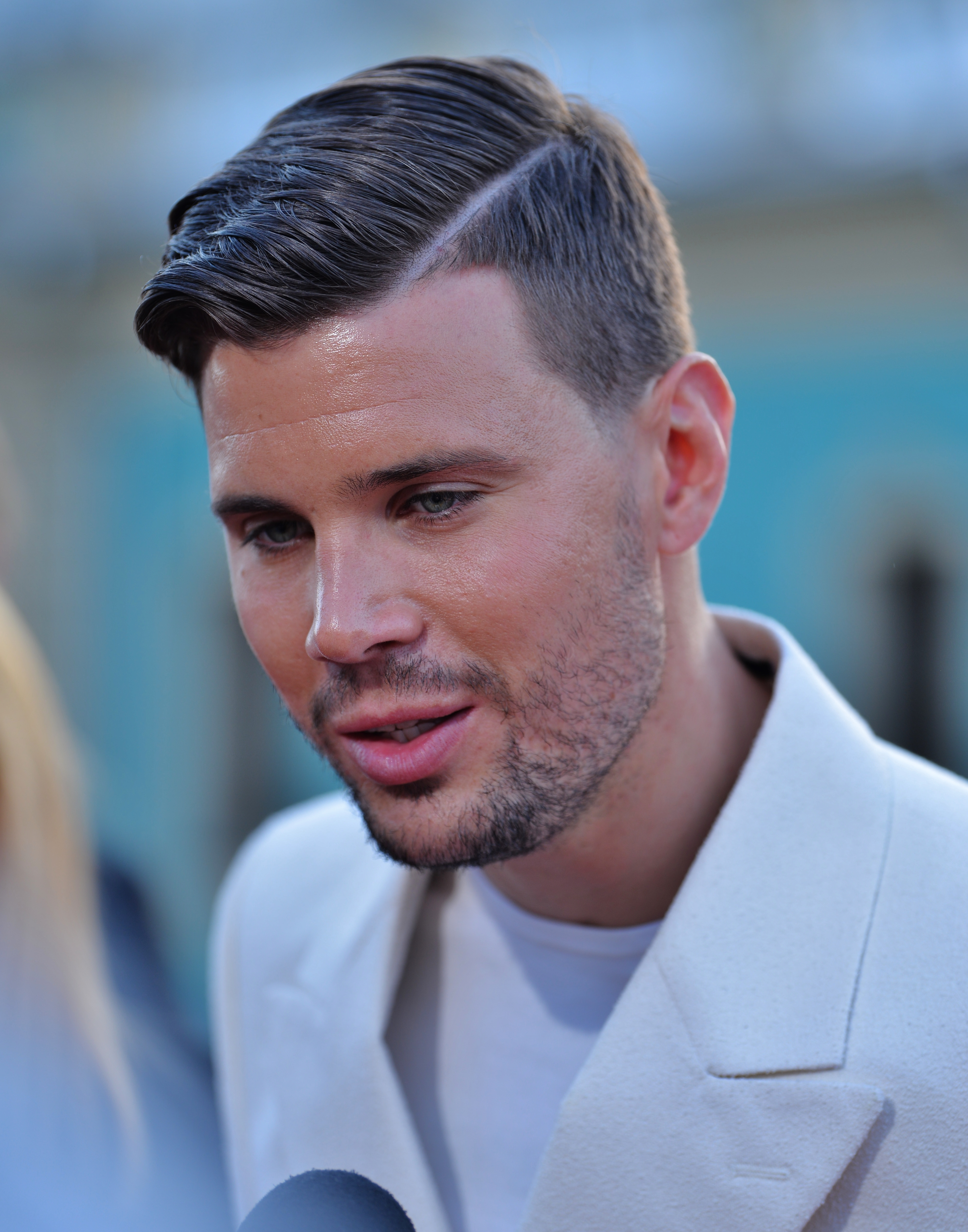
Robin Bengtsson during the opening ceremony of Eurovision 2017

According to Eurovision rules, all nations with the exceptions of the host country and the "Big Five" (France, Germany, Italy, Spain and the United Kingdom) are required to qualify from one of two semi-finals in order to compete for the final; the top ten countries from each semi-final progress to the final. The European Broadcasting Union (EBU) split up the competing countries into six different pots based on voting patterns from previous contests, with countries with favourable voting histories put into the same pot. On 31 January 2017, a special allocation draw was held which placed each country into one of the two semi-finals, as well as which half of the show they would perform in. Sweden was placed into the first semi-final, to be held on 9 May 2017, and was scheduled to perform in the first half of the show.

Once all the competing songs for the 2017 contest had been released, the running order for the semi-finals was decided by the shows' producers rather than through another draw, so that similar songs were not placed next to each other. Sweden was set to open the show and perform in position 1, before the entry from Georgia.

The two semi-finals and the final were televised in Sweden on SVT1 with commentary by Måns Zelmerlöw and Edward af Sillén. The Swedish spokesperson, who announced the top 12-point score awarded by the Swedish jury during the final, was Wiktoria Johansson.

=== Semi-final ===
Robin Bengtsson took part in technical rehearsals on 30 April and 4 May, followed by dress rehearsals on 8 and 9 May. This included the jury show on 8 May where the professional juries of each country watched and voted on the competing entries.

At the end of the show, Sweden was announced as having finished in the top 10 and subsequently qualifying for the grand final. It was later revealed that Sweden placed third in the semi-final, receiving a total of 227 points: 103 points from the televoting and 124 points from the juries.

=== Final ===
Shortly after the second semi-final, a winners' press conference was held for the ten qualifying countries. As part of this press conference, the qualifying artists took part in a draw to determine which half of the grand final they would subsequently participate in. This draw was done in the reverse order the countries appeared in the semi-final running order. Sweden was drawn to compete in the second half. Following this draw, the shows' producers decided upon the running order of the final, as they had done for the semi-finals. Sweden was subsequently placed to perform in position 24, following the entry from Belgium and before the entry from Bulgaria.

=== Voting ===
Below is a breakdown of points awarded to Sweden and awarded by Sweden in the first semi-final and grand final of the contest, and the breakdown of the jury voting and televoting conducted during the two shows:

==== Points awarded to Sweden ====
Points awarded to Sweden (Semi-final 1)
Score	Televote	Jury
12 points		Belgium; Finland
10 points	Albania; Iceland; Portugal	Czech Republic; Italy
8 points	Australia	Australia; Cyprus; Georgia; Iceland; Moldova
7 points	Finland; Latvia	Slovenia
6 points	Azerbaijan; Spain	Montenegro
5 points	Belgium; Cyprus; Poland; Slovenia	Armenia; Portugal
4 points	Armenia; Georgia	Albania; Poland
3 points	Greece; Montenegro	Spain
2 points	Czech Republic	Greece; Latvia; United Kingdom
1 point	Italy; Moldova; United Kingdom	

Points awarded to Sweden (Final)
Score	Televote	Jury
12 points	Denmark	Belgium; Denmark; Finland
10 points		Israel; Italy; Switzerland
8 points	Iceland	Belarus; France; Georgia; Iceland; Moldova; United Kingdom
7 points	Malta; Ukraine	Czech Republic; Montenegro; Portugal; Romania
6 points	Australia; Finland	Armenia; Australia; Cyprus; Ireland; Lithuania; Netherlands; Norway; Slovenia
5 points	Cyprus; Macedonia; Norway; Spain	Spain
4 points	Latvia; Netherlands; United Kingdom	Austria; Croatia; Germany; Poland
3 points	Armenia; Azerbaijan; Belarus; Estonia; Greece; Hungary; Israel; Lithuania; Moldova; Poland	Estonia
2 points	Albania; Belgium; Bulgaria; Croatia; Romania; San Marino	Serbia
1 point	Austria; Georgia; Portugal; Serbia; Slovenia; Switzerland	Hungary; Macedonia

==== Points awarded by Sweden ====
Points awarded by Sweden (Semi-final 1)
Score	Televote	Jury
12 points	Portugal	Australia
10 points	Belgium	Moldova
8 points	Finland	Cyprus
7 points	Iceland	Finland
6 points	Poland	Georgia
5 points	Moldova	Portugal
4 points	Cyprus	Czech Republic
3 points	Armenia	Belgium
2 points	Australia	Iceland
1 point	Montenegro	Slovenia

Points awarded by Sweden (Final)
Score	Televote	Jury
12 points	Belgium	Portugal
10 points	Portugal	Australia
8 points	Moldova	Moldova
7 points	Bulgaria	Bulgaria
6 points	Norway	Italy
5 points	Poland	Denmark
4 points	Hungary	Austria
3 points	Romania	Netherlands
2 points	Croatia	Cyprus
1 point	Italy	Belgium

==== Detailed voting results ====
The following members comprised the Swedish jury:

- Michael Cederberg (jury chairperson) – music editor
- Wiktoria Johansson (Wiktoria) – artist
- Maria Lundin – music producer, composer
- Gustav Efraimsson – music producer, composer
- Andreas Johnson – singer-songwriter

Detailed voting results from Sweden (Semi-final 1)
R/O	Country	Jury							Televote	
R/O	Country	M. Cederberg	Wiktoria	M. Lundin	G. Efraimsson	A. Johnson	Rank	Points	Rank	Points
01	Sweden									
02	Georgia	5	12	4	7	7	5	6	17	
03	Australia	1	6	3	1	3	1	12	9	2
04	Albania	10	16	7	17	13	14		15	
05	Belgium	9	14	9	9	2	8	3	2	10
06	Montenegro	12	17	14	6	16	17		10	1
07	Finland	6	7	2	11	8	4	7	3	8
08	Azerbaijan	15	8	12	12	6	11		16	
09	Portugal	11	9	1	15	1	6	5	1	12
10	Greece	13	11	16	14	10	15		12	
11	Poland	14	5	13	8	14	12		5	6
12	Moldova	2	1	10	4	5	2	10	6	5
13	Iceland	4	10	15	5	12	9	2	4	7
14	Czech Republic	7	4	5	10	17	7	4	11	
15	Cyprus	3	2	6	2	9	3	8	7	4
16	Armenia	16	15	8	13	4	13		8	3
17	Slovenia	17	3	11	3	15	10	1	13	
18	Latvia	8	13	17	16	11	16		14	

Detailed voting results from Sweden (Final)
R/O	Country	Jury							Televote	
R/O	Country	M. Cederberg	Wiktoria	M. Lundin	G. Efraimsson	A. Johnson	Rank	Points	Rank	Points
01	Israel	16	10	21	20	19	20		18	
02	Poland	11	16	19	14	21	17		6	5
03	Belarus	25	22	15	13	20	23		23	
04	Austria	13	2	6	3	18	7	4	19	
05	Armenia	17	18	12	24	11	18		15	
06	Netherlands	7	4	3	19	14	8	3	14	
07	Moldova	2	5	13	4	5	3	8	3	8
08	Hungary	21	11	20	17	15	19		7	4
09	Italy	4	13	10	7	3	5	6	10	1
10	Denmark	14	3	5	8	9	6	5	17	
11	Portugal	8	7	1	6	2	1	12	2	10
12	Azerbaijan	20	15	11	12	13	15		20	
13	Croatia	19	24	14	21	12	21		9	2
14	Australia	5	8	4	1	6	2	10	12	
15	Greece	18	23	25	25	23	24		21	
16	Spain	23	12	22	9	25	22		25	
17	Norway	9	17	7	16	16	13		5	6
18	United Kingdom	22	6	9	15	10	12		16	
19	Cyprus	3	9	16	2	22	9	2	11	
20	Romania	6	19	23	23	7	16		8	3
21	Germany	10	14	8	11	17	11		24	
22	Ukraine	24	25	24	22	24	25		22	
23	Belgium	15	21	17	5	1	10	1	1	12
24	Sweden									
25	Bulgaria	12	1	2	10	4	4	7	4	7
26	France	1	20	18	18	8	14		13	
