= Ace Wilder =

Swedish singer (born 1982)

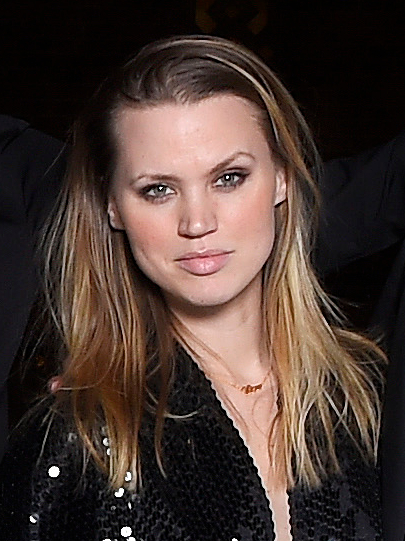

Background information
- Born: Alice Kristina Ingrid Gernandt; 23 July 1982 (age 44); Stockholm, Sweden
- Genres: Pop; electropop; hip hop
- Occupations: Singer; songwriter
- Instrument: Vocals
- Years active: 2004–present
- Labels: EMI; Warner Music

Alice Kristina Ingrid Gernandt (born 23 July 1982), better known by her stage name Ace Wilder, is a Swedish singer and songwriter. She first received public attention with her participation in Melodifestivalen 2014 with the song "Busy Doin' Nothin'".

== Early life ==
Wilder was born on July 23, 1982, in Stockholm, Sweden. She grew up in several places around the world, and for a long time she lived in Miami, Florida in the United States. She is the great-niece of radio personality Anders Gernandt.

== Career ==
=== 2013–2015: Breakthrough and Busy Doin' Nothin ===
After several years of singing and dancing behind international singers on world tours, Wilder decided in 2012 to launch her solo singing career. She got a record deal with EMI Records and Warner Music. She released the single "Do It", which has since been used in American television shows. In 2013 she released the single "Bitches Like Fridays". In late 2013 Wilder's debut album A Wilder was awarded "Best Music Album of the Year" at the Scandipop Awards.

She made her breakthrough in the Swedish music industry after participating in Melodifestivalen 2014. Wilder qualified for the final on 8 March in Friends Arena, progressing from the third semifinal in Scandinavium with her song "Busy Doin' Nothin'". She placed second in the final two points behind the eventual winner Sanna Nielsen. The song went on to reach the number-one position on the Swedish singles chart staying atop the charts for three consecutive weeks.

Ace released her follow-up single “Riot” in November 2014 . “Stupid” was then released in March 2015. Both songs featured on Wilder’s second EP “The Wild Card” which was released in June 2015. Ace proceeded to tour Sweden to promote the EP at festivals and events throughout the summer.

=== 2015–present: Melodifestivalen 2016 and Melodifestivalen 2017 ===
In November 2015, it was revealed that Wilder would compete in the first semi-final of the Melodifestivalen 2016 with the song "Don't Worry". She qualified directly for the final along with Robin Bengtsson. In the final she placed third with the juries, eighth with the Swedish public, and placed third overall. In June 2016, Ace released a new single named “Selfish”. She described the song as “a diary entry” as the lyrics were so personal. She gave performances of the song on national Swedish TV shows “Lotta På Liseberg” & “Nyhetsmorgon” throughout the summer. Wilder was part of the Lineup of the 2016 Diggiloo tour alongside Jessica Andersson, Oscar Zia and many more of Sweden’s most well known and respected artists.

On November 30, 2016, Wilder was announced as one of the 28 acts to compete in Melodifestivalen 2017 with the song "Wild Child". She qualified directly to final from the first semi-final, along with Nano. She placed seventh in the final with a total of 67 points, 35 from the jury and 32 from the televote.

In June 2017, Wilder released a cover of the 1987 Lena Philipsson smash-hit “dansa i neon” in partnership with “Svenska Spel” to promote Neon scratch cards that Ace herself designed.

She participated in Stjärnornas stjärna broadcast on TV4 in 2018, In Week 1, the theme was country music. Wilder covered “Man, I Feel Like A Woman” by Shania Twain. In Week 2, the theme was Latin music. Wilder covered “Rhythm Is Gonna Get You” By Gloria Estefan. Wilder was first eliminated on week 2 after receiving the fewest public votes.

In April 2018, Ace launched her vintage clothing blog “Wilder Wintage”. Ace Wilder returned to Melodifestivalen in 2019 & 2020 both times as a stylist for Malou Prytz. In an interview at the 2019 contest, Wilder confirmed that she was taking a break from music hence the 2 year long absence from releasing any new material. Wilder revealed that she was “burnt out” and felt “uninspired”. Wilder confirmed that her break wasn’t a permanent retirement from music and that she will “do music again at some point in the future”. She also expressed interest at returning to Melodifestivalen as a lead artist for the 4th time.

In 2019, Wilder starred in an original Swedish film named A Music Story about an 11-year-old’s dreams of competing on a kid's talent show, but her musician father forbids her based on his fears and failed career. Ace featured on 2 songs on the official soundtrack to the film “Born To Be Free” & “Like an American Idol. Ace Wilder made a cameo in the film.

In February 2025, Wilder opened the fourth heat of Melodifestivalen 2025 in Malmö, performing "Busy Doin' Nothin'" along with competition hosts Keyyo and Edvin Törnblom.

== Discography ==
=== EPs ===
Title	Details	Peak chart positions
Title	Details	SWE
A Wilder	Released: 21 December 2013; Label: Warner Music Sweden; Format: CD, digital download	—
Busy Doin' Nothin' Remixes	Released: 16 June 2014; Label: Warner Music Sweden; Format: CD, digital download	—
The Wildcard	Released: 12 June 2015; Label: Warner Music Sweden; Format: CD, digital download	—
"—" denotes a recording that did not chart or was not released in that territory.

=== Singles ===
Title	Year	Peak chart positions		Certifications	Album
Title	Year	SWE	FIN	Certifications	Album
"Do It"	2013	—	—		A Wilder
"Bitches Like Fridays"	2013	—	—		A Wilder
"Busy Doin' Nothin'"	2014	1	27	GLF: 3× Platinum	Non-album single
"Riot"	2014	—	—		The Wildcard
"Stupid"	2015	—	—		The Wildcard
"Don't Worry"	2016	13	—	GLF: Platinum	Non-album singles
"Selfish"	2016	—	—		Non-album singles
"Wild Child"	2017	30	—		Non-album singles
"Dansa i neon"	2017	—	—		Non-album singles
"—" denotes a recording that did not chart or was not released in that territory.

=== Songwriting discography ===
Year	Artist	Title	Album
2006	Betty	"Papermoon Dragon"	
2007	Soccx	"From Dusk Till Dawn (Get The Party Started)"	Hold On
2007	Soccx	"Scream Out Loud"	Hold On
2009	Stefanie Heinzmann	"Love Fever"	Roots to Grow
2009	Stefanie Heinzmann	"No One (Can Ever Change My Mind)"	Roots to Grow
2009	Sweetbox	"Magic"	The Next Generation
2009	Jolin Tsai	"花蝴蝶" (Butterfly)	Butterfly
2009	Sofia Sida	"Gold Star"	Butterfly
2010	Jennifer Rush	"Head Above Water"	Now Is The Hour
2010	Soma Manuchar	"Crazy 'Bout the Boy"	Crazy 'Bout the Boy
2011	Ava Rocks	"Heart On The Dancefloor"	
2011	Honey	"Carry On"	Honey
2011	Honey	"Hungover"	Honey
2011	Martina Aitolehti	"Corrupted"	Martina
2012	Emma Fällman	"Call Him Dick"	
2012	Alisa Galper	"Rock Your Body"	Alisa
2014	Margaret Berger	"Scream"	New Religion
2014	Anna Abreu	"Oh Oh"	V
2015	4Minute	"간지럽혀 (Tickle Tickle Tickle)"	Crazy
2015	Mariette	"Say Never"	My Revolution - EP
