= Statements (song) =

Single by Loreen
- Released: 26 February 2017
- Recorded: 2016
- Genre: Art pop; industrial; synth-pop
- Length: 3:01
- Label: Warner Music Sweden
- Songwriters: Loren Talhaoui; Anton Hård af Segerstad; Joy Deb; Linnea Deb
- Producer: The Family

Loreen singles chronology
"Get Into It" (2016)	"Statements" (2017)	"Body" (2017)

"Statements" is a song by Swedish pop singer and music producer Loreen. The song was released as a digital download on 26 February 2017 through Warner Music Sweden. The song took part in Melodifestivalen 2017. The song was written by Loreen Talhaoui and the producers Anton Hård af Segerstad, Joy Deb and Linnea Deb under the alias The Family.

== Melodifestivalen 2017 ==
On 30 November 2016, Loreen was announced as one of the 28 acts to compete in Melodifestivalen 2017 with her song "Statements". She took part in the fourth semi-final on 25 February 2017 at Skellefteå Kraft Arena, Skellefteå. "Statements" failed to qualify directly to the final, but competed in the second chance round as a duel against "Kiss You Goodbye" by Anton Hagman. "Statements" lost this round and did not progress to the final.

== Track listing ==
Digital download
No.	Title	Length
1.	"Statements"	3:01

Digital download (Furrer remix)
No.	Title	Length
1.	"Statements "	4:55

Digital download (Hounded remix)
No.	Title	Length
1.	"Statements "	3:12

== Charts ==
Chart (2017)	Peak position
Sweden (Sverigetopplistan)	13

== Release history ==
Country	Date	Format	Label
Sweden	26 February 2017	Digital download	Warner Music Sweden
