= Melodifestivalen 2017 =

Swedish music competition

Dates and venue
- Heat 1: 4 February 2017
- Heat 2: 11 February 2017
- Heat 3: 18 February 2017
- Heat 4: 25 February 2017
- Second chance: 4 March 2017
- Final: 11 March 2017

Production
- Broadcaster: Sveriges Television (SVT)
- Director: Robin Hofwander; Fredrik Bäcklund
- Presenters: Clara Henry; David Lindgren; Hasse Andersson

Participants
- Number of entries: 28
- Number of finalists: 12

Vote
- Winning song: "I Can't Go On" by Robin Bengtsson

Melodifestivalen 2017 was the 57th edition of the Swedish music competition Melodifestivalen, which selected Sweden's entry for the Eurovision Song Contest 2017. The competition was organised by Sveriges Television (SVT) and took place over a six-week period between 4 February and 11 March 2017.

The format of the competition consisted of 6 shows: 4 heat rounds, a second chance round and a final. An initial 28 entries were selected for the competition through three methods: an open call for song submissions, direct invitations to specific artists and songwriters and a wildcard given to one of the artists that participated in the Svensktoppen nästa competition organised by Sveriges Radio P4. The 28 competing entries were divided into four heats, with seven compositions in each. From each heat, the songs that earn first and second place qualified directly to the final, while the songs that place third and fourth proceeded to the Second Chance round. The bottom three songs in each heat were eliminated from the competition. An additional four entries qualified from the Second Chance round to the final, bringing the total number of competing entries in the final to 12. All 6 shows were hosted by Clara Henry, David Lindgren and Hasse Andersson.

The winning song would compete for Sweden at the Eurovision Song Contest 2017 to be held in Kyiv, Ukraine. Sweden competed in the first semi-final of the Eurovision Song Contest 2017 on 9 May and had to place within the top 10 out of the 18 in their semi-final in order to qualify and compete in the final on 13 May.

== Format ==
Melodifestivalen 2017, organised by Sveriges Television (SVT), was the sixteenth consecutive edition of the contest in which the competition took place in different cities across Sweden. The four heats were held at the Scandinavium in Gothenburg (4 February), the Malmö Arena in Malmö (11 February), the Vida Arena in Växjö (18 February) and the Skellefteå Kraft Arena in Skellefteå (25 February). The Second Chance round took place at the Saab Arena in Linköping on 4 March while the final was held at the Friends Arena in Solna on 11 March. An initial 28 entries competed in the heats, with seven entries taking part in each show. The top two entries from each heat advanced directly to the final, while the third and fourth placed entries advanced to the Second Chance round. The bottom three entries in each heat were eliminated. An additional four entries qualified for the final from the Second Chance round, bringing the total number of competing entries in the final to 12.

Christer Björkman was announced as the executive producer of the competition, while Annette Helenius was assigned as the project manager for a second consecutive year.

Competition Schedule
Show	Date	City	Venue
Heat 1	4 February	Gothenburg	Scandinavium
Heat 2	11 February	Malmö	Malmö Arena
Heat 3	18 February	Växjö	Vida Arena
Heat 4	25 February	Skellefteå	Skellefteå Kraft Arena
Second Chance round	4 March	Linköping	Saab Arena
Final	11 March	Stockholm	Friends Arena

=== Entry selection ===
Entries for the 2017 competition were selected through three methods:

- 14 entries were chosen by a selection panel from submissions received by SVT through an open call for songs.
- 13 entries were selected by SVT via special invitations to artists and songwriters.
- 1 entry was provided by the selected artist from the competition Svensktoppen nästa organised by Sveriges Radio P4.

SVT opened two submission contests that accepted entries between 1 and 19 September 2016 for interested artists and songwriters to submit their proposals for the competition. The Regular contest was open for entries that had at least one songwriter that already had a musical work published, while the Public contest accepted entries from songwriters without previously published musical work. Entries submitted for the competition were required to be new compositions which had never been published, between 2–3 minutes in length and with at least one songwriter that holds Swedish citizenship. The choice of language was free, however, SVT aims to have 30% of the contest's places reserved for entries sung mainly in Swedish. SVT also aims to reserve at least 50% of the contest's places for entries written by female composers and lyricists either in a solo or collaborative capacity.

Following the conclusion of the submission periods, SVT received 2,478 entries—an increase of 28 entries from the previous year. 2,116 of the entries were entered into the Regular contest, while 362 entries were entered into the Public contest. SVT created a shortlist of entries from the received submissions and formed a selection panel that was tasked to select fourteen entries for the competition. Only five entries from the Public contest were under consideration with no guarantee that one would be selected to compete in Melodifestivalen.

=== Presenters ===
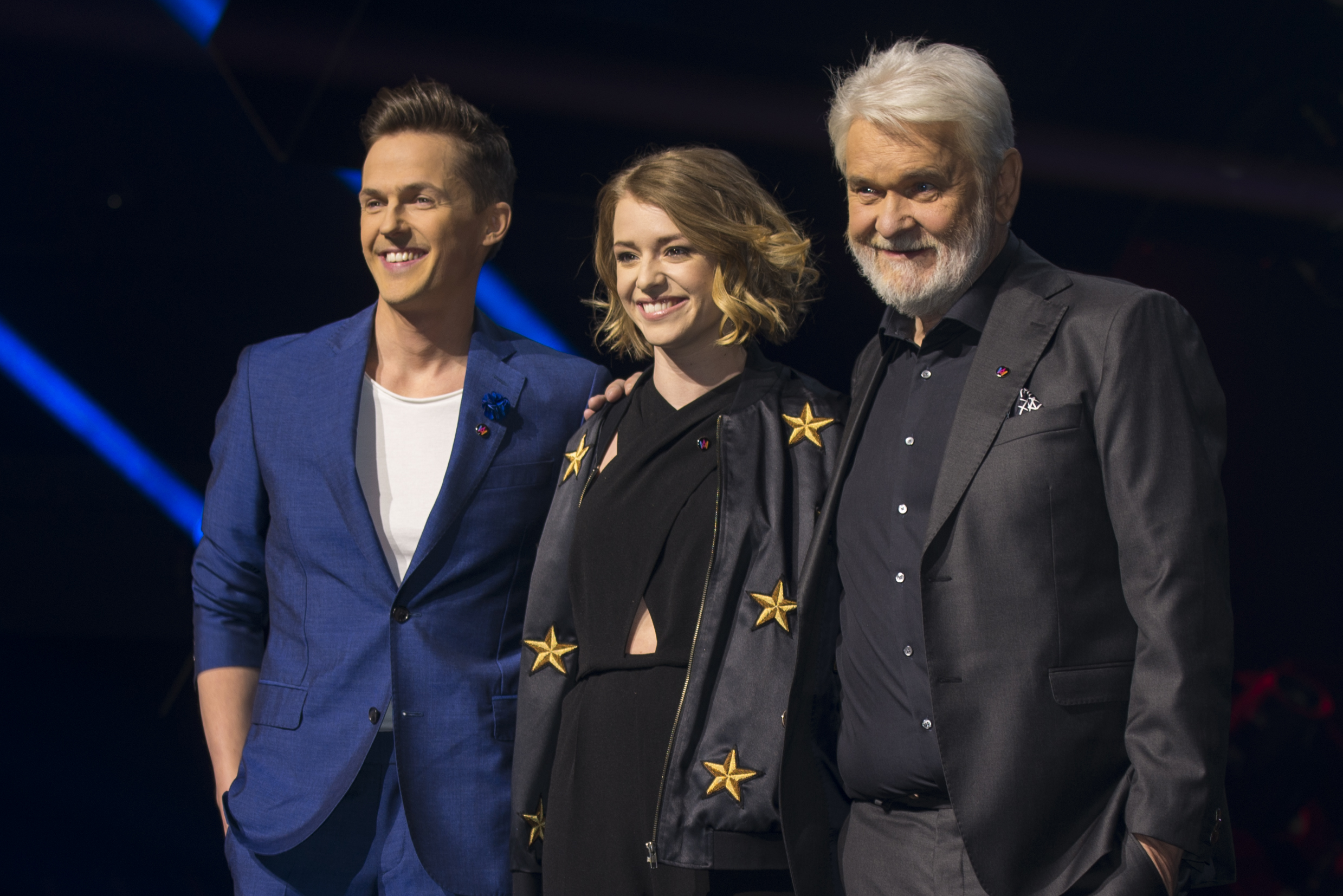
The hosts David Lindgren, Clara Henry, and Hasse Andersson.

At a press conference on 30 September 2016, Clara Henry, David Lindgren and Hasse Andersson were announced as the hosts for all six shows of Melodifestivalen 2017. Henry previously appeared in comedic skits and hosted pre and post shows during Melodifestivalen 2014. Lindgren and Andersson previously competed as artists in the competition; Lindgren took part in 2012, 2013 and 2016, while Andersson took part in 2015.

== Competing entries ==
Information regarding the selected entries and artists were publicised by SVT on 30 November 2016. On 28 August 2016, Les Gordons were selected as the first artists for Melodifestivalen from the competing artists that took part in the Svensktoppen nästa competition organised by Sveriges Radio P4.

Artist	Song (English Translation)	Songwriter(s)
Ace Wilder	"Wild Child"	Peter Boström, Thomas G:son, Ace Wilder
Adrijana	"Amare"	Adrijana Krasniqi, Martin Tjärnberg
Alice	"Running with Lions"	Anderz Wrethov, Andreas "Stone" Johansson, Denniz Jamm, Alice Svensson
Allyawan	"Vart har du vart" (Where have you been)	Masse Salazar, Samuel Nazari
Anton Hagman	"Kiss You Goodbye"	Christian Fast, Tim Schou, Henrik Nordenback
Axel Schylström	"När ingen ser" (When no one is looking)	Behshad Ashnai, Axel Schylström, David Strääf
Bella & Filippa	"Crucified"	Peter Hägerås, Mats Frisell, Jakob Stadell, Filippa Frisell, Isabella Snihs
Benjamin Ingrosso	"Good Lovin'"	Benjamin Ingrosso, Louis Schoorl, Matt Parad, MAG
Boris René	"Her Kiss"	Tim Larsson, Tobias Lundgren
Charlotte Perrelli	"Mitt liv" (My life)	Charlotte Perrelli, Lars Hägglund
De Vet Du	"Road Trip"	Johan Gunterberg, Christopher Martland
Dinah Nah	"One More Night"	Thomas G:son, Jimmy Jansson, Dinah Nah, Dr. Alban
Dismissed	"Hearts Align"	Ola Salo, Peter Kvint
Etzia	"Up"	Johnny Sanchez, Hanif Sabzevari, Simon Gribbe, Erica Haylett
FO&O	"Gotta Thing About You"	Robert "Mutt" Lange, Tony Nilsson
Jasmine Kara	"Gravity"	Anderz Wrethov, Jasmine Kara
Jon Henrik Fjällgren feat. Aninia	"En värld full av strider (Eatneme gusnie jeenh dåaroeh)" (A world full of battles)	Jon Henrik Fjällgren, Sara Biglert, Christian Schneider, Andreas Hedlund
Krista Siegfrids	"Snurra min jord" (Spin my world)	Krista Siegfrids, Gustaf Svenungsson, Magnus Wallin, Gabriel Alares
Les Gordons	"Bound to Fall"	Jonatan Renström, Albert Björliden, Andreas Persson, Carl Ragnemyr, David Runebjörk, Jimmy Jansson
Lisa Ajax	"I Don't Give A"	Ola Svensson, Linnea Deb, Joy Deb, Anton Hård af Segerstad
Loreen	"Statements"	Lorine Talhaoui, Anton Hård af Segerstad, Joy Deb, Linnea Deb
Mariette	"A Million Years"	Thomas G:son, Johanna Jansson, Peter Boström, Mariette Hansson, Jenny Hansson
Nano	"Hold On"	Nano Omar, Gino Yonan, Ayak, Carl Rydén, Christoffer Belaieff, Rikard de Bruin, David Francis Jackson
Owe Thörnqvist	"Boogieman Blues"	Owe Thörnqvist
Robin Bengtsson	"I Can't Go On"	David Kreuger, Hamed "K-One" Pirouzpanah, Robin Stjernberg
Roger Pontare	"Himmel och hav" (Sky and sea)	Thomas G:son, Alexzandra Wickman
Sara Varga & Juha Mulari	"Du får inte ändra på mig" (You mustn't change me)	Sara Varga, Lars Hägglund
Wiktoria	"As I Lay Me Down"	Justin Forrest, Jonas Wallin, Lauren Dyson

== Heats ==
As in previous years, Melodifestivalen will commence with four heats, which will determine the eight entries that will advance directly to the final and the eight entries that will qualify to the Second Chance round.

=== Heat 1 ===
The first heat took place on 4 February 2017 at the Scandinavium arena in Gothenburg. A total of 5,706,113 votes were cast throughout the show.

R/O	Artist	Song	Votes				Place	Result
R/O	Artist	Song	Round 1	Round 2	Total	%	Place	Result
1	Boris René	"Her Kiss"	895,618	89,512	985,130	17,31%	3	Second chance
2	Adrijana	"Amare"	407,097	—	407,097	7,15%	6	Out
3	Dinah Nah	"One More Night"	693,220	42,010	735,230	12,92%	5	Out
4	De Vet Du	"Road Trip"	870,399	48,384	918,738	16,15%	4	Second chance
5	Charlotte Perrelli	"Mitt liv"	399,536	—	399,536	7,02%	7	Out
6	Ace Wilder	"Wild Child"	981,435	84,811	1,066,246	18,74%	2	Final
7	Nano	"Hold On"	1,056,413	122,263	1,178,676	20,71%	1	Final

=== Heat 2 ===
The second heat took place on 11 February 2017 at Malmö Arena in Malmö. A total of 5,395,695 votes were cast throughout the show.

R/O	Artist	Song	Votes				Place	Result
R/O	Artist	Song	Round 1	Round 2	Total	%	Place	Result
1	Mariette	"A Million Years"	997,489	93,211	1,090,700	20,25%	1	Final
2	Roger Pontare	"Himmel och hav"	681,661	61,404	743,065	13,8%	5	Out
3	Etzia	"Up"	363,025	—	363,025	6,74%	6	Out
4	Allyawan	"Vart har du vart"	346,299	—	346,299	6,43%	7	Out
5	Dismissed	"Hearts Align"	668,878	76,880	745,758	13,85%	4	Second chance
6	Lisa Ajax	"I Don't Give A"	969,355	67,178	1,036,533	19,25%	3	Second chance
7	Benjamin Ingrosso	"Good Lovin'"	966,140	93,588	1,059,728	19,68%	2	Final

=== Heat 3 ===
The third heat took place on 18 February 2017 at Vida Arena in Växjö. A total of 5,756,071 votes were cast throughout the show.

R/O	Artist	Song	Votes				Place	Result
R/O	Artist	Song	Round 1	Round 2	Total	%	Place	Result
1	Robin Bengtsson	"I Can't Go On"	945,977	85,502	1,031,479	17,99%	1	Final
2	Krista Siegfrids	"Snurra min jord"	407,769	—	407,769	7,11%	7	Out
3	Anton Hagman	"Kiss You Goodbye"	811,844	68,796	880,640	15,36%	4	Second chance
4	Jasmine Kara	"Gravity"	672,565	—	672,565	11,73%	6	Out
5	Owe Thörnqvist	"Boogieman Blues"	803,452	158,074	961,526	16,77%	2	Final
6	Bella & Filippa	"Crucified"	783,759	83,582	867,341	15,13%	5	Out
7	FO&O	"Gotta Thing About You"	825,454	87,576	913,030	15,92%	3	Second chance

=== Heat 4 ===
The fourth heat took place on 25 February 2017 at Skellefteå Kraft Arena in Skellefteå. A total of 4,951,648 votes were cast throughout the show.

R/O	Artist	Song	Votes				Place	Result
R/O	Artist	Song	Round 1	Round 2	Total	%	Place	Result
1	Jon Henrik Fjällgren feat. Aninia	"En värld full av strider (Eatneme gusnie jeenh dåaroeh)"	815,030	101,324	916,354	18,57%	2	Final
2	Alice	"Running with Lions"	673,153	49,243	722,396	14,64%	5	Out
3	Les Gordons	"Bound to Fall"	400,845	—	400,845	8,12%	6	Out
4	Wiktoria	"As I Lay Me Down"	987,935	84,445	1,072,380	21,73%	1	Final
5	Axel Schylström	"När ingen ser"	671,044	59,683	730,727	14,81%	4	Second chance
6	Sara Varga & Juha Mulari	"Du får inte ändra på mig"	219,558	—	219,558	4,45%	7	Out
7	Loreen	"Statements"	768,421	104,230	872,651	17,68%	3	Second chance

== Second Chance round ==
Second Chance round took place on 4 March 2017 at Cloetta Center in Linköping. The duels were revealed following the fourth heat on 25 February 2017. A total of 7,223,709 votes were cast throughout the show.

Duel	R/O	Artist	Song	Votes	%	Result
I	1	FO&O	"Gotta Thing About You"	970,831	53,02%	Final
I	2	De Vet Du	"Road Trip"	860,182	46,98%	Out
II	1	Axel Schylström	"När ingen ser"	926,610	49,85%	Out
II	2	Lisa Ajax	"I Don't Give A"	932,362	50,15%	Final
III	1	Boris René	"Her Kiss"	1,061,289	63,71%	Final
III	2	Dismissed	"Hearts Align"	607,015	36,29%	Out
IV	1	Anton Hagman	"Kiss You Goodbye"	975,547	52,30%	Final
IV	2	Loreen	"Statements"	889,873	47,70%	Out

== Final ==
The Final took place on 11 March 2017 at Friends Arena in Stockholm. A record-breaking total of 13,566,778 votes were cast. Zara Larsson performed a medley of her singles "I Would Like" and "Ain't My Fault" during the interval act, whilst Melodifestivalen 2016 winner Frans performed his winning entry "If I Were Sorry" before the announcement of the International Jury votes.

R/O	Artist	Song	Juries	Televote/SMS/App			Total	Place
R/O	Artist	Song	Juries	Votes	Percentage	Points	Total	Place
1	Ace Wilder	"Wild Child"	35	920,421	6.8%	32	67	7
2	Boris René	"Her Kiss"	35	904,646	6.7%	31	66	8
3	Lisa Ajax	"I Don't Give A"	16	847,353	6.2%	30	46	9
4	Robin Bengtsson	"I Can't Go On"	96	1,435,963	10.6%	50	146	1
5	Jon Henrik Fjällgren feat. Aninia	"En värld full av strider (Eatneme gusnie jeenh dåaroeh)"	56	1,395,012	10.3%	49	105	3
6	Anton Hagman	"Kiss You Goodbye"	6	1,058,232	7.8%	37	43	10
7	Mariette	"A Million Years"	62	1,068,531	7.9%	37	99	4
8	FO&O	"Gotta Thing About You"	7	962,987	7.1%	34	41	11
9	Nano	"Hold On"	76	1,627,843	11.9%	57	133	2
10	Wiktoria	"As I Lay Me Down"	29	1,474,526	10.9%	51	80	6
11	Benjamin Ingrosso	"Good Lovin'"	54	961,104	7.1%	33	87	5
12	Owe Thörnqvist	"Boogieman Blues"	1	910,160	6.7%	32	33	12

Detailed International Jury Votes
R/O	Song	Armenia	Australia	United Kingdom	France	Israel	Italy	Malta	Norway	Poland	Czech Republic	Ukraine	Total
R/O	Song	Armenia	Australia	United Kingdom	France	Israel	Italy	Malta	Norway	Poland	Czech Republic	Ukraine	Total
1	"Wild Child"	1	2	12	2	2	6	10					35
2	"Her Kiss"	6	1			4		2	4	6	8	4	35
3	"I Don't Give A"				1				1		12	2	16
4	"I Can't Go On"	8	10	4	10	12	8	8	12	12	4	8	96
5	"En värld full av strider (Eatneme gusnie jeenh dåaroeh)"	2	8	2	8		12		2	10		12	56
6	"Kiss You Goodbye"					1	2			2	1		6
7	"A Million Years"	12	6		12	8	10	6			2	6	62
8	"Gotta Thing About You"			1		6							7
9	"Hold On"	10	4	10	4		4	12	8	4	10	10	76
10	"As I Lay Me Down"	4		8	6			4	6			1	29
11	"Good Lovin'"		12	6		10	1	1	10	8	6		54
12	"Boogieman Blues"									1			1
International Jury Spokespersons
Armenia – Iveta Mukuchyan; Australia – Stephanie Werret; United Kingdom – Simon Proctor; France – Edoardo Grassi; Israel – Tali Eshkoli; Italy – Nicola Caligiore; Malta – Gordon Bonello; Norway – Anette Lauenborg Waaler; Poland – Mateusz Grzesiński; Czech Republic – Jan Bors; Ukraine – Victoria Romanova

== Broadcast and ratings ==
All six shows in the competition were televised live on SVT1 and SVT World as well as streamed online via the broadcaster's streaming service SVT Play. The shows were also broadcast via radio on Sveriges Radio P4.

Show	Date	Viewers
Heat 1	4 February 2017	3,244,000
Heat 2	11 February 2017	3,094,000
Heat 3	18 February 2017	3,210,000
Heat 4	25 February 2017	3,407,000
Second Chance	4 March 2017	3,097,000
Final	11 March 2017	3,794,000
