= Lay Me Down =

Lay Me Down may refer to:

== Songs ==
- "Lay Me Down" (Avicii song), 2013
- "Lay Me Down" (The Dirty Heads song), 2010
- "Lay Me Down" (Pixie Lott song), 2014
- "Lay Me Down" (Sam Smith song), 2013
- "Lay Me Down", by David Crosby and Graham Nash from their album Crosby & Nash, 2004
- "Lay Me Down", by Adele Adkins from her album 25
- "Lay Me Down", by Badfinger from their album Head First
- "Lay Me Down", by Michelle Branch from her album Hotel Paper, featured in The Wreckers' album Stand Still, Look Pretty
- "Lay Me Down", by Suzi Quatro from her album Rock Hard
- "Lay Me Down", by Crossfade from their album We All Bleed
- "Lay Me Down", by REO Speedwagon from their album R.E.O. Speedwagon
- "Lay Me Down", by X Ambassadors from their EP Litost

== Other uses ==
- "Lay Me Down" (Haven), a 2013 episode of the television series Haven

== See also ==
- "As I Lay Me Down", a 1995 song by Sophie B. Hawkins
- "As I Lay Me Down", a 2017 song by Swedish singer Wiktoria
- "To Lay Me Down", a song by Jerry Garcia from his album Garcia
