= Chasing Rivers =

Single by Nano
- Released: February 2, 2019
- Genre: Pop
- Label: Warner Music
- Songwriters: Linnea Deb; Joy Deb; Lise Cabble; Nano Omar; Thomas G:son

"Chasing Rivers" is a song by Swedish singer Nano. The song was performed for the first time in Melodifestivalen 2019, where it made it to the final. This was Nanos first music single after his 2017 Melodifestivalen entry "Hold On".

== Charts ==
Chart (2019)	Peak position
Sweden (Sverigetopplistan)	14
