= Andreas Hedlund (composer) =

Arranger, orchestrator and composer from Sweden

- Born: September 20, 1983 (age 42); Stockholm, Sweden
- Occupations: Arranger, Orchestrator, Composer
- Years active: 2012–present

Andreas Hedlund (born 1983) is an arranger, orchestrator and composer from Sweden, mainly known for his orchestral work for various Symphonic Game Music Concerts in Europe and Japan. He is not to be confused with vocalist Andreas Hedlund (aka Vintersorg).

== Game Music Concerts ==
Andreas's work includes orchestral arrangements of franchises such as Megaman, Assassin's Creed: Black Flag, Super Mario, Amiga, Bloodborne, The Last of Us, Sonic the Hedgehog, Skyrim and Xenogears, among others, and have been performed by orchestras in both Europe and Japan.

In 2016 "Score: Orchestral Game Music" with Swedish Radio Orchestra was broadcast on Swedish national television. From this concert, his arrangement of the Skyrim theme "Dragonborn Comes" with vocalist Sabina Zweiacker has reached 30 million views on YouTube (December, 2025).

In 2017, in collaboration with producer Thomas Böcker and video game composer Chris Hülsbeck, Andreas wrote two arrangements for the crowdfunded album "Turrican: Orchestral Selections". In 2018, collaboration continued with another arrangement from the Commodore 64 game "Katakis".

In 2019, Andreas was commissioned by Thomas Böcker and Square Enix to write an arrangement of "Xenogears", premiering in the "Square Enix: Symphonic Memories" concert in Kanagawa, Japan.

== Other work ==
Besides arrangements and orchestration work, Andreas has composed music for various documentaries, television shows and also several episodes of James Rolfe's YouTube persona "Angry Video Game Nerd" and his other character "Board James". He's also participated as songwriter in Swedish Eurovision twice, with the songs "En värld full av strider (Eatneme gusnie jeenh dåaroeh)" (2017), and "Icarus" (2018) and as an arranger, had multiple collaborations with artists such as Nina Persson (The Cardigans) and Loney Dear.
