= As I Lay Me Down (Wiktoria song) =

Single by Wiktoria
- Released: 25 February 2017
- Recorded: 2016
- Genre: Pop; country pop; folk pop
- Length: 3:09
- Label: Moon Man Records
- Songwriter(s): Justin Forrest; Jonas Wallin; Lauren Dyson
- Producer(s): Didrik Franzén

Wiktoria singles chronology
"Unthink You" (2016)	"As I Lay Me Down" (2017)	"I Won't Stand In Your Way" (2017)

"As I Lay Me Down" is a song recorded by Swedish singer Wiktoria, written by Justin Forrest, Jonas Wallin, and Lauren Dyson and produced by Didrik Franzen. The song was released as a digital download in Sweden on 25 February 2017 and peaked at number 2 on the Swedish Singles Chart.

It took part in Melodifestivalen 2017, and qualified to the final from the fourth semi-final on 25 February 2017. Being the heavy favorite to win, it placed only sixth in the final; eight with the international juries and second with the Swedish public. Although not winning the contest, it eventually became the biggest hit out of the participating entries, beating the winner "I Can't Go On" and runner-up "Hold On". When Swedish radio station Rix FM asked its listeners in late 2019 to rank the 100 best songs of the 2010s, the song ranked 59th; out of the Melodifestivalen entries on the list, only contest winners "Heroes" (5th) and "Euphoria" (15th) ranked higher, which titles "As I Lay Me Down" as the most successful Melodifestivalen entry of the decade not to win the actual competition.

== Track listing ==
Digital download
No.	Title	Length
1.	"As I Lay Me Down"	3:09

== Chart performance ==
=== Weekly charts ===
Chart (2017)	Peak position
Sweden (Sverigetopplistan)	2

=== Year-end charts ===
Chart (2017)	Position
Sweden (Sverigetopplistan)	41

== Release history ==
Region	Date	Format	Label
Sweden	25 February 2017	Digital download	Moon Man Records
