= Axel Schylström =

Swedish singer

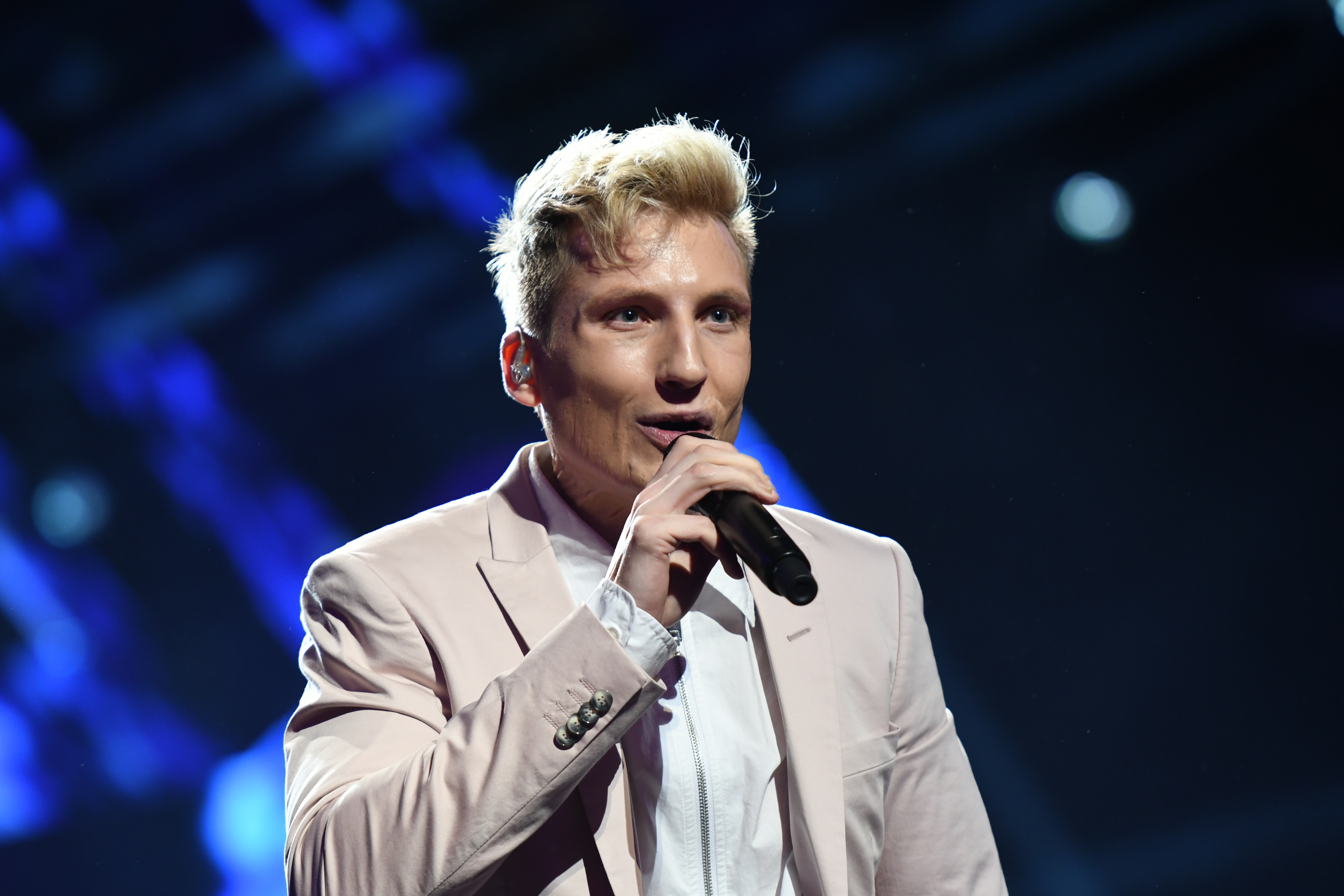
- Schylström during Melodifestivalen 2017

Background information
- Born: 24 February 1993 (age 33); Norrköping, Sweden
- Genres: Pop
- Occupation: singer
- Instrument: Vocals
- Years active: 2015–present

Axel Schylström (born 24 February 1993) is a Swedish singer. He first came to prominence in 2015 while competing on season eleven of Swedish Idol, where he placed fourth. In 2017, he competed in Melodifestivalen 2017, with the song "När ingen ser".

== Life and career ==
=== Early life ===
Schylström was born in 1993 in Norrköping. In 2012, he was involved in a serious accident after climbing to the top of a train and coming into contact with power lines. He received a 16,000 volt electric shock which resulted in burns on 70% of his body.

=== Music career ===
Schylström began his music career in 2015, after being selected to compete in season eleven of Swedish Idol. He progressed through the competition, until getting eliminated ninth in the live shows, placing 4th.

==== Melodifestivalen 2017 ====
In 2016, he was confirmed to be taking part in Melodifestivalen 2017 with the song "När ingen ser". He competed in the fourth semi-final, held on 25 February 2017, where he qualified to andra chansen. In andra chansen, held on 4 March, he competed against Lisa Ajax and her song "I Don't Give A" for a spot in the final, but lost the duel.

==== Melodifestivalen 2023 ====
In November 2022, Axel along with other 27 singers was confirmed to take part in Melodifestivalen 2023. On 25 February 2023, he performed his song "Gorgeous" in the fourth semi-final. Schylström came up 4th in the second round of voting, only one point away from qualifying to the second chance.

== Discography ==
=== Singles ===
Title	Year	Peak chart positions	Album
Title	Year	SWE	Album
"The Champion"	2015	—	Non-album singles
"Förändra mig"	2016	—	Non-album singles
"Mer Jul"	2016	—	Non-album singles
"När ingen ser"	2017	31	Non-album singles
"Gorgeous"	2023	89	Non-album singles
"Genom livet"	2024	— (Note: "Genom livet" did not enter the Swedish Singellista Chart, but peaked at number 11 on the Swedish Heatseeker Chart.)	Non-album singles
"—" denotes a single that did not chart or was not released.
