= Busy Doing Nothing =

Busy Doing Nothing may refer to:

- "Busy Doing Nothing", a song by Bing Crosby on the soundtrack of the film A Connecticut Yankee in King Arthur's Court 1949
- "Busy Doing Nothing", a song by Japanese singer Crystal Kay, her US debut
- "Busy Doin' Nothin'", a song by the Beach Boys
- "Busy Doin' Nothin'" (Ace Wilder song), a song by Swedish singer Ace Wilder
