= Jasmine Kara =

Swedish singer and songwriter (born 1988)

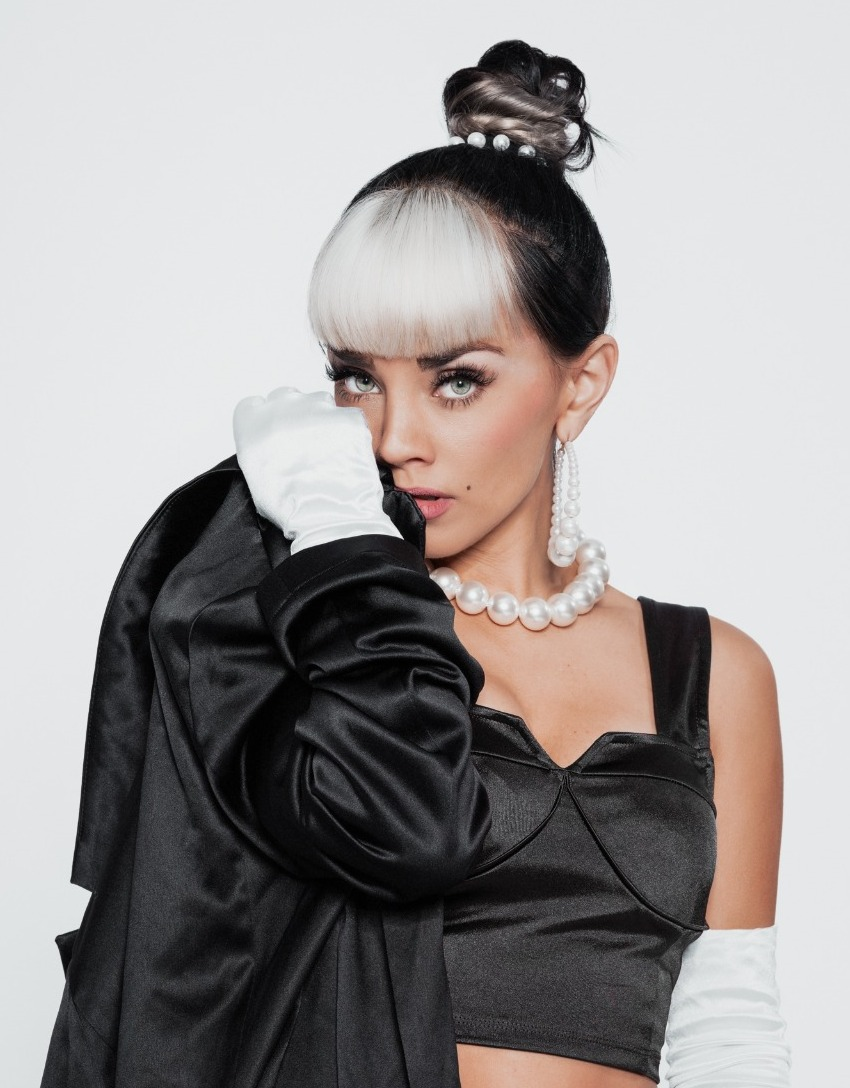
- Kara in 2021

Background information
- Also known as: Jasmine Kara
- Born: Jasmine Karolina Kara Khatib-Nia; 23 June 1988 (age 38) Örebro, Sweden
- Origin: Örebro, Sweden
- Genres: Pop; soul
- Occupations: Singer; songwriter; producer; author
- Instruments: Vocals; harmonica
- Years active: 2009–present
- Label: Karasmatic Music
- Website: https://jasminekara.com

Jasmine Karolina Kara Khatib-Nia (born Karolina Khatib-Nia, 23 June 1988), known by her stage name Jasmine Kara, is a Swedish-Iranian singer, songwriter, and author. Her breakthrough came in the summer of 2010, when she released her debut album Blues Ain't Nothing But a Good Woman Gone Bad, sang in Allsång på Skansen, and at a concert held in connection with the Wedding of Victoria, Crown Princess of Sweden, and Daniel Westling. Since then, she has frequently appeared in Swedish music TV shows such as Let's Dance on TV4, Lotta på Liseberg, and Moraeus Med Mera. Jasmine had P3 Gold nominations, performed at the Swedish Grammy awards, and has toured in Sweden, Japan, UK and the United States.

In the Persian music industry, she has appeared in TV shows like Sina Valiollah Show, Shabe Jomeh, and Chaharshanbe Suri for Manoto TV and MBC Persia. She has also had success as a songwriter, with two number one albums on the world charts, one on iTunes ("Kick Back by WayV") and a Billboard number one with the song "100" on the album SuperOne by SuperM.

As an author, Jasmine has released two books, Hälsa henne att hon ska dö (Tell her she's dead) and Den mörka scenen (The dark stage).

== Biography ==
Jasmine Kara was born and raised in Örebro, Sweden, to a Swedish mother and an Iranian father. At an early age, she realised music was her big interest and she participated in numerous local talent shows. During her late teens, she was in an abusive relationship and it was at that time that she used music to feel better again. Kara released the biographic book Hälsa henne att hon ska dö (Tell her she's dead), in which she talks about her abusive relationship and her childhood.

At age eighteen, Kara moved to New York City, United States to fulfill her dream of signing a record deal. After knocking on many record label doors and performing on the street and in the subways of New York City, she succeeded in getting gigs in Brooklyn, Queens and Manhattan. She sang in front of Beyoncé and Jay-Z when they visited a club where she was performing. In the end, a newly established record label, the Tri-Sound owned by Marshall Chess, signed Kara. Marshall Chess later became the executive producer for Kara's first music album Blues Ain't Nothing But A Good Woman Gone Bad, which was released on 28 July 2010 and was recorded at Cosmos Studios in Stockholm. In 2012 the same album was also released in Japan and got attention. Songs from the album were radiolisted on J-Wave, Tokyo FM and the Tokyo Hot 100 list.

The album Blues Aint Nothing But a Good Woman Gone Bad was released in the UK in March 2010 and the single "In the Basement" placed number one on the iTunes blues list. Several of Kara's songs were playlisted on BBC and she performed live in UK radio shows such as the Robert Elms Show, Sir Terry Wogan's show Weekend Wogan, and the Chris Evans breakfast show. The single "Try My Love Again" was featured in the clothing company M&Co's TV commercial that was aired in Ireland, Wales and the UK.

In 2010, Kara became known to the Swedish audience when she participated in Allsång på Skansen on Sveriges Television (SVT). Sshe also participated as a celebrity contestant on Körslaget on TV4 in 2011. In 2013, she performed at Lotta på Liseberg.

Kara competed as a celebrity dancer in Let's Dance 2014 partnering with professional dancer Stefano Oradei. She was eliminated on 4 April 2014 after her fifth appearance and performance on the show. The same year, Jasmine started her own record label, Karasmatic Music, and released her second album Unbreakable.

She participated in Melodifestivalen 2017 with the song "Gravity". The song reached number 57 on Sverigetopplistan, but she was eliminated in the third semi-final.

Kara began singing in Persian for the first time on Eldfesten (Chaharshanbe Suri) in 2018 and it was televised on Manoto TV and SVT. Since then she has done many more performances for the Iranian audience, like Sina Valiollah Show, Shabe Jomeh and Echo on Manoto TV. She has released three songs in Persian: "Lab-khand" (Smile), "Bord-i az Yaad-am" (you've forgotten me) and "Miresim be Asemoon-ha" (we'll reach the skies) feat. Rana Farhan.

She has also released several versions of her songs in Spanish, and has performed other songs in over 25 languages on her Tiktok series “Guess the language”. On TikTok, she had her first break 2024 singing in Somali and Amharic. Since then, she has received millions of views on her videos, gained over a hundred thousand followers and become a name in Ethiopia and other parts of the world through her singing in different languages.

In 2022, Kara released her second book, Den mörka scenen (The dark stage), about her hidden double life. Behind the scenes of a public career as an artist and performer, Jasmine worked as a stripper for more than 10 years. The book has received a lot of attention and Kara has been interviewed on television shows, newspapers, radio shows, and podcasts.

In the summer of 2023, Kara released her first album in Swedish, Svart på vitt. The album's ten songs were written in collaboration with Peter Kvint, Albin Lee Meldau, and Mattias Green and produced by Peter Kvint.

== Discography ==
=== Studio albums ===
Title	Details	Peak chart positions
Title	Details	SWE
Blues Ain't Nothing But a Good Woman Gone Bad	Released: 27 July 2010; Label: Tri-Sound	23
Unbreakable	Released: 24 September 2014; Label: Karasmatic Music AB	—
Svart på Vitt	Released 21 July 2023; Label: Karasmatic Music AB	—
Side Stories	Released 26 September 2025; Label: Karasmatic Music AB	
"—" denotes an album that did not chart or was not released.

=== EPs ===
Title	Details	Peak chart positions
Title	Details	SWE
Black & White X-mas	Released: 2 December 2017; Label: Karismatic Music	—
"—" denotes an album that did not chart or was not released.

=== Singles ===
==== As lead artist ====
Title	Year	Peak chart positions			Certifications	Album
Title	Year	SWE	UK	Tokyo	Certifications	Album
"In the Basement"	2010	—	#1 (iTunes Blues list)			Blues Ain't Nothing But a Good Woman Gone Bad
"Try My Love Again"	2010	—	#5 (iTunes Blues list)			Blues Ain't Nothing But a Good Woman Gone Bad
"Ain't No More Room"	2011	—		Top 10 Hot 100		Blues Ain't Nothing But a Good Woman Gone Bad
"Paralyzed"	2013	—				Non-album single
"Can't Lie to Me"	2013	—				Unbreakable
"Beautiful World"	2014	—				Unbreakable
"Imperfect"	2014	—				Unbreakable
"Change"	2014	—				Unbreakable
"Fade to Black"	2016	—				Love at First Sound
"Celly"	2016	—				Love at First Sound
"Gravity"	2017	57				Non-album single
"Smile (English), "Labkhand" (Persian), and "Risas" (Spanish)	2018	—				Non-album single
"Call Back" (English), "Bordi az Yadam" (Persian), and "Nunca Llamas" (Spanish)	2019	—				Non-album single
"X-Mas Money"	2019	—				Non-album single
"Funkin' Fresh"	2020	—				Non-album single
"Life Sucks"	2020	—				Non-album single
"Thirsty" (and Remix)	2020	—				Non-album single
"Cash is Queen"	2020	—				Non-album single
"—" denotes a single that did not chart or was not released.

==== Other songwriting credits ====
Title	Year	Artist	Album
"Love Your Body"	2016	John Lundvik	Non-album single
"100"	2020	SuperM	Super One
"Kick Back"	2021	WayV	Kick Back
"Lucid Dream"	2023	Craxy	Lucid Dream

== Bibliography ==
- 2010: Hälsa Henne Att Hon Ska Dö (autobiography)
- 2023: Den mörka Scenen (The dark stage)
