= Her Kiss =

Single by Boris René
- Released: 4 February 2017
- Recorded: 2016
- Genre: Pop; R&B; soul
- Length: 3:03
- Label: Warner Music Sweden
- Songwriter(s): Tim Larsson; Tobias Lundgren

Boris René singles chronology
"Mon Amour" (2016)	"Her Kiss" (2017)

"Her Kiss" is a song recorded by Swedish singer Boris René. The song was released as a digital download in Sweden on 4 February 2017 and peaked at number 50 on the Swedish Singles Chart. It is taking part in Melodifestivalen 2017, and qualified to andra chansen from the first semi-final on 4 February 2017. The song qualified from andra chansen on 4 March 2017. It was written by Tim Larsson and Tobias Lundgren.

== Track listing ==
Digital download
No.	Title	Length
1.	"Her Kiss"	3:03

== Chart performance ==
=== Weekly charts ===
Chart (2017)	Peak position
Sweden (Sverigetopplistan)	42

== Release history ==
Region	Date	Format	Label
Sweden	4 February 2017	Digital download	Warner Music Sweden
