= En värld full av strider (Eatneme gusnie jeenh dåaroeh) =

Single by Jon Henrik Fjällgren featuring Aninia
- Released: 26 February 2017
- Recorded: 2016
- Genre: Pop rock; joik
- Length: 3:09
- Label: Sony Music Sweden
- Songwriters: Jon Henrik Fjällgren; Sara Biglert; Christian Schneider; Andreas Hedlund

Jon Henrik Fjällgren singles chronology
"Jag är fri (Manne leam frijje)" (2015)	"En värld full av strider (Eatneme gusnie jeenh dåaroeh)" (2017)

Aninia singles chronology
"En värld full av strider (Eatneme gusnie jeenh dåaroeh)" (2017)

"En värld full av strider (Eatneme gusnie jeenh dåaroeh)" (transl. A world full of battles) is a song recorded by Swedish-Sami singer Jon Henrik Fjällgren featuring Swedish singer Aninia. The song was released as a digital download in Sweden on 26 February 2017 and peaked at number 23 on the Swedish Singles Chart. It is sung in Swedish and Southern Sami. It took part in Melodifestivalen 2017, and qualified to the final from the fourth semi-final on 25 February 2017. The song placed third in the final. It was written by Fjällgren, Sara Biglert, Christian Schneider, and Andreas Hedlund.

== Track listing ==
Digital download
No.	Title	Length
1.	"En värld full av strider (Eatneme gusnie jeenh dåaroeh)"	3:07

== Chart performance ==
Chart (2017)	Peak position
Sweden (Sverigetopplistan)	12

== Release history ==
Region	Date	Format	Label
Sweden	26 February 2017	Digital download	Sony Music Sweden
