= Road Trip (song) =

Single by De Vet Du

from the album Skip Rate
- Released: 26 February 2017
- Recorded: 2016
- Genre: Pop; comedy; dance
- Length: 3:10
- Label: Universal Music Sweden
- Songwriters: Johan Gunterberg; Christopher Martland

De Vet Du singles chronology
"k.R.e.D.d" (2016)	"Road Trip" (2017)	"Som MJ (Beatörta)" (2017)

"Road Trip" is a song recorded by Swedish group De Vet Du. The song was released as a digital download in Sweden on 26 February 2017 and peaked at number 9 on the Swedish Singles Chart. It is taking part in Melodifestivalen 2017, and qualified to andra chansen from the first semi-final on 4 February 2017. The song was written by Johan Gunterberg and Christopher Martland.

== Track listing ==
Digital download
No.	Title	Length
1.	"Road Trip"	3:10

== Chart performance ==
=== Weekly charts ===
Chart (2017)	Peak positions
Sweden (Sverigetopplistan)	9

== Release history ==
Region	Date	Format	Label
Sweden	26 February 2017	Digital download	Universal Music Sweden
