= I Can't Go On =

2017 single by Robin Bengtsson

Single by Robin Bengtsson
- Released: 26 February 2017
- Recorded: 2016
- Genre: Electropop
- Length: 3:03
- Label: Capitol
- Songwriters: David Kreuger; Hamed "K-One" Pirouzpanah; Robin Stjernberg
- Producers: David Kreuger; Hamed "K-One" Pirouzpanah; Robin Stjernberg

Robin Bengtsson singles chronology
"Stevie Wonder" (2016)	"I Can't Go On" (2017)	"Dark Angel" (2017)

Eurovision Song Contest 2017 entry
- Country: Sweden
- Artist: Robin Bengtsson
- Language: English
- Composers: David Kreuger; Hamed "K-One" Pirouzpanah; Robin Stjernberg
- Lyricists: David Kreuger; Hamed "K-One" Pirouzpanah; Robin Stjernberg

Finals performance
- Semi-final result: 3rd
- Semi-final points: 227
- Final result: 5th
- Final points: 344

Entry chronology
- ◄ "If I Were Sorry" (2016)
- "Dance You Off" (2018) ►

"I Can't Go On" is a song recorded by Swedish singer Robin Bengtsson. The song was released as a digital download in Sweden on 26 February 2017 and peaked at number three on the Swedish Singles Chart. It won Melodifestivalen 2017 and represented Sweden in the Eurovision Song Contest 2017. The song is written by David Kreuger, Hamed "K-One" Pirouzpanah, and Robin Stjernberg.

== Eurovision Song Contest ==
Bengtsson was announced to be taking part in Melodifestivalen 2017, Sweden's national final for the Eurovision Song Contest 2017, on 30 November 2016.

He competed in the third semi-final on 18 February 2017 and qualified directly to the final. He won the final of Melodifestivalen on 11 March 2017, after placing first with the international juries and third with the Swedish public. Sweden opened the first semi-final at the Eurovision Song Contest. The song finished 5th with 344 points at the grand final, including 126 points from televote (8th place) and 218 points from the juries (3rd place).

== Track listing ==
Digital download
No.	Title	Length
1.	"I Can't Go On"	3:03

== Credits and personnel ==
- Robin Bengtsson – vocals
- David Kreuger – songwriter, producer
- Hamed Pirouzpanah – songwriter, producer
- Robin Stjernberg – additional vocals, songwriter, keyboards, producer
- Molly Pettersson Hammar – additional vocals
- Petter Lindgård – trombone
- Jens Lindgård – trumpet
- Frank Nilsson – drums
- Lars Norgren – mix, mastering

Credits adapted from Qobuz.com

== Charts ==
=== Weekly charts ===
Chart (2017)	Peak position
Belgium (Ultratip Bubbling Under Flanders)	23
Finland Download (Latauslista)	12
France (SNEP)	132
Hungary (Single Top 40)	40
Iceland (RÚV)	2
Netherlands (Dutch Single Tip)	23
Poland Airplay (ZPAV)	19
Scottish Singles Sales (Official Charts)	66
Sweden (Sverigetopplistan)	3
Switzerland (Schweizer Hitparade)	83
UK Singles Downloads (Official Charts)	62

=== Year-end charts ===
Chart (2017)	Position
Sweden (Sverigetopplistan)	56

== Certifications ==
Region	Certification	Certified units/sales
Sweden (GLF)	2× Platinum	80,000^{‡}
^{‡} Sales+streaming figures based on certification alone.

== Release history ==
Region	Date	Format	Label
Sweden	26 February 2017	Digital download	Capitol Records
