= Gravity (Jasmine Kara song) =

Single by Jasmine Kara
- Released: 26 February 2017
- Recorded: 2016
- Genre: Dance-pop
- Length: 2:59
- Label: Warner Music Sweden
- Songwriter(s): Anderz Wrethov; Jasmine Kara

Jasmine Kara singles chronology
"Celly" (2016)	"Gravity" (2017)

"Gravity" is a song recorded by Swedish singer Jasmine Kara. The song was released as a digital download in Sweden on 26 February 2017 and peaked at number 57 on the Swedish Singles Chart. It took part in Melodifestivalen 2017, and placed sixth in the third semi-final on 18 February 2017. It was written by Kara and Anderz Wrethov.

== Track listing ==
Digital download
No.	Title	Length
1.	"Gravity"	2:56

== Charts ==
Chart (2017)	Peak position
Sweden (Sverigetopplistan)	57

== Release history ==
Region	Date	Format	Label
Sweden	26 February 2017	Digital download	Warner Music Sweden
