= Wild Child (Ace Wilder song) =

Single by Ace Wilder
- Released: 26 February 2017
- Recorded: 2016
- Genre: Pop
- Length: 2:56
- Label: Stereoscope Music Scandinavia
- Songwriter(s): Peter Boström; Thomas G:son; Ace Wilder

Ace Wilder singles chronology
"Selfish" (2016)	"Wild Child" (2017)

"Wild Child" is a song recorded by Swedish singer Ace Wilder. The song was released as a digital download in Sweden on 26 February 2017 and peaked at number 51 on the Swedish Singles Chart. It took part in Melodifestivalen 2017 and qualified to the final from the first semi-final on 4 February 2017. It placed seventh in the final. It was written by Peter Boström, Thomas G:son, and Ace Wilder.

== Track listing ==
Digital download
No.	Title	Length
1.	"Wild Child"	2:56

== Chart performance ==
Chart (2017)	Peak position
Sweden (Sverigetopplistan)	30

== Release history ==
Region	Date	Format	Label
Sweden	26 February 2017	Digital download	Stereoscope Music Scandinavia
