= När ingen ser =

Single by Axel Schylström
- Released: 26 February 2017
- Recorded: 2016
- Genre: Dance-pop
- Length: 2:58
- Label: Giant Records
- Songwriters: Behshad Ashnai; Axel Schylström; David "Strääf" Solence

Axel Schylström singles chronology
"Mer Jul" (2016)	"När ingen ser" (2017)

"När ingen ser" (transl. When no one sees) is a song recorded by Swedish singer Axel Schylström. The song was released as a digital download in Sweden on 26 February 2017 and peaked at number 41 on the Swedish Singles Chart. It took part in Melodifestivalen 2017, and qualified to andra chansen from the fourth semi-final on 25 February 2017. It was written by Behshad Ashnai, Schylström and David Strääf.

== Track listing ==
Digital download
No.	Title	Length
1.	"När ingen ser"	2:58

== Chart performance ==
=== Weekly charts ===
Chart (2017)	Peak position
Sweden (Sverigetopplistan)	31

== Release history ==
Region	Date	Format	Label
Sweden	26 February 2017	Digital download	Giant Records
