= Bella & Filippa =

Swedish music duo

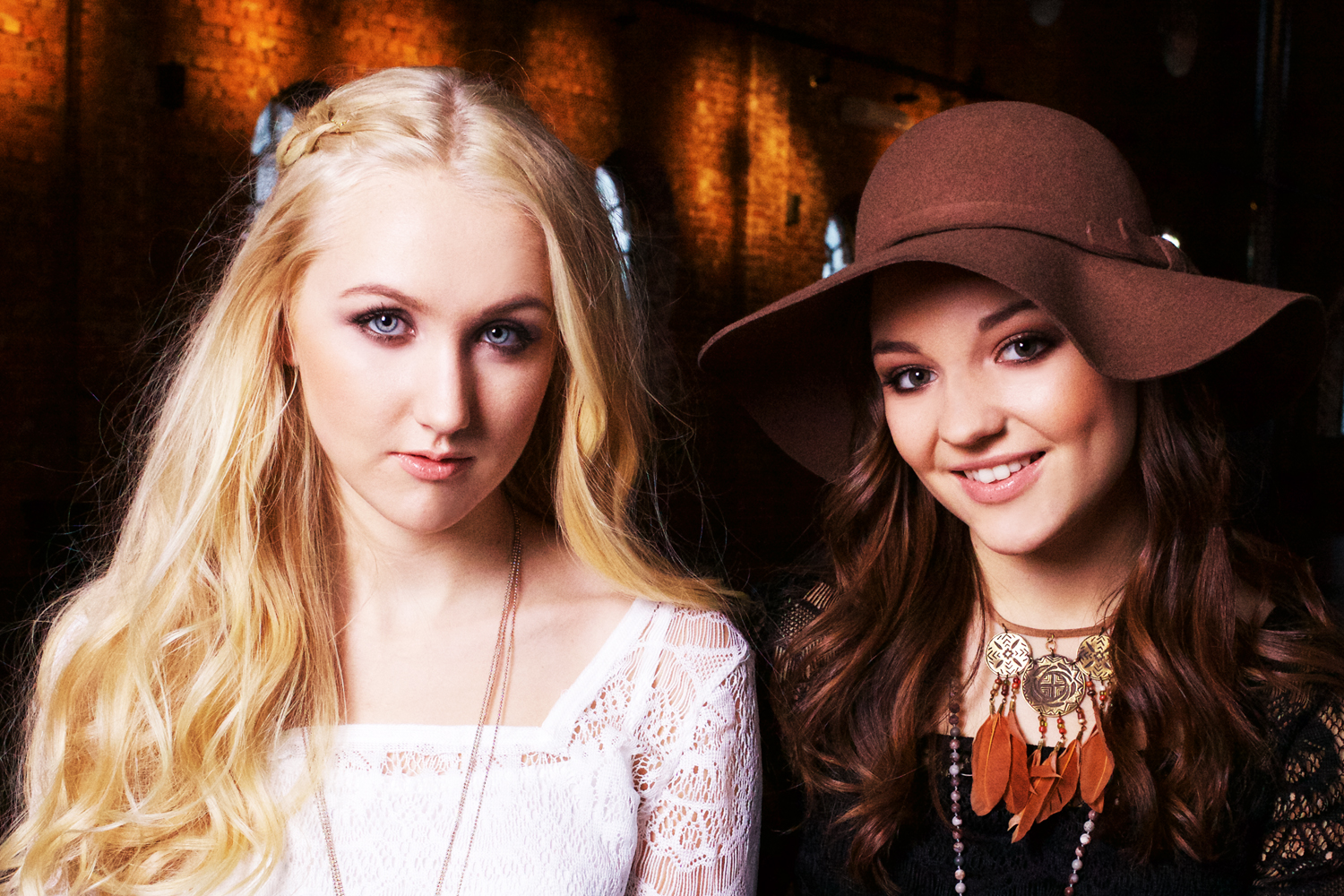
- Bella (left) & Filippa (right) in 2017

Background information
- Origin: Upplands Väsby, Sweden
- Genres: Folk pop
- Years active: 2013–present
- Label: Warner Music Sweden
- Members: Isabella Snihs; Filippa Frisell

Bella & Filippa is a Swedish duo from Upplands Väsby. It is made up of stepsisters Isabella Snihs (born 31 May 2000) and Filippa Frisell (born 6 July 1999). They are best known for taking part in Melodifestivalen 2017.

== History ==
Bella & Filippa began their music careers in 2013 after launching their music blog, on which they've since accumulated over 50,000 followers. They frequently perform covers of songs by notable artists, such as Miriam Bryant, Tori Kelly, Shawn Hook, and Lukas Graham.

On 30 November 2016, the duo were announced to be competing in Melodifestivalen 2017 with the song "Crucified". They took part in the third semi-final held on 18 February 2017, and placed fifth, being eliminated from the competition. Snihs was the first artist born in the 2000s to ever take part in Melodifestivalen.

== Discography ==
=== Singles ===
Title	Year	Peak chart positions	Certifications	Album
Title	Year	SWE	Certifications	Album
"Missing Rose"	2016	—		Non-album single
"Crucified"	2017	47		Non-album single
