= Crucified (Bella & Filippa song) =

Single by Bella & Filippa
- Released: 26 February 2017
- Recorded: 2016
- Genre: Folk pop
- Length: 2:59
- Label: Starlab
- Songwriter(s): Peter Hägerås; Mats Frisell; Jakob Stadell; Filippa Frisell; Isabella Snihs

Bella & Filippa singles chronology
"Missing Rose" (2016)	"Crucified" (2017)

"Crucified" is a song recorded by Swedish duo Bella & Filippa. The song was released as a digital download in Sweden on 26 February 2017 and peaked at number 47 on the Swedish Singles Chart. It took part in Melodifestivalen 2017, and placed fifth the third semi-final on 18 February 2017. It was written by Peter Hägerås, Mats Frisell, Jakob Stadell, Filippa Frisell, and Isabella Snihs.

== Track listing ==
Digital download
No.	Title	Length
1.	"Crucified"	2:59

== Chart performance ==
Chart (2017)	Peak position
Sweden (Sverigetopplistan)	47

== Release history ==
Region	Date	Format	Label
Sweden	26 February 2017	Digital download	Warner Music Sweden
