= Adrijana Krasniqi =

Swedish singer, songwriter, and rapper

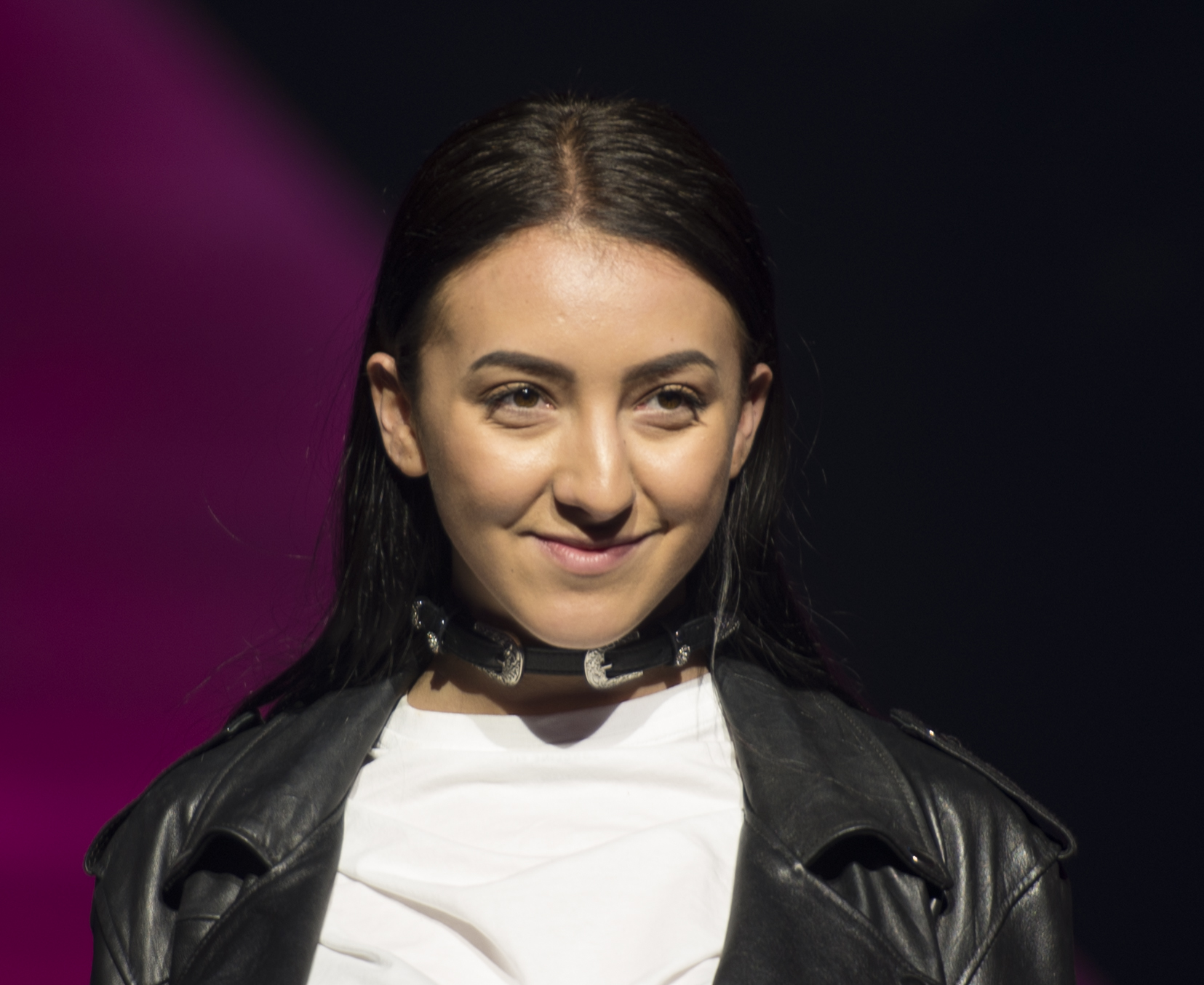
- Adrijana during the first rehearsal for Melodifestivalen 2017

Background information
- Born: 4 November 1997 (age 28); Rottne, Sweden
- Origin: Rottne, Sweden
- Genres: Pop; R&B; hip hop
- Occupations: Singer; songwriter; rapper
- Years active: 2015–present

Adrijana Krasniqi (born 4 November 1997), better known as Adrijana, is a Swedish singer, songwriter, and rapper of Macedonian Albanian origin. She is best known for competing in Melodifestivalen 2017.

In 2015, Krasniqi released her first official single "Mammas Opel", and then in October 2016, she signed with record label Universal Music Sweden. Later the same year she got to perform at the hip hop stage Debaser in Stockholm. In 2017, she competed in Melodifestivalen 2017, the Swedish national selection for the Eurovision Song Contest 2017, with the song "Amare", which she wrote together with Martin Tjärnberg. She came in 6th place in the first semi-final on 4 February. On 10 February 2017, "Amare" entered the Swedish Singles Chart at number 62.

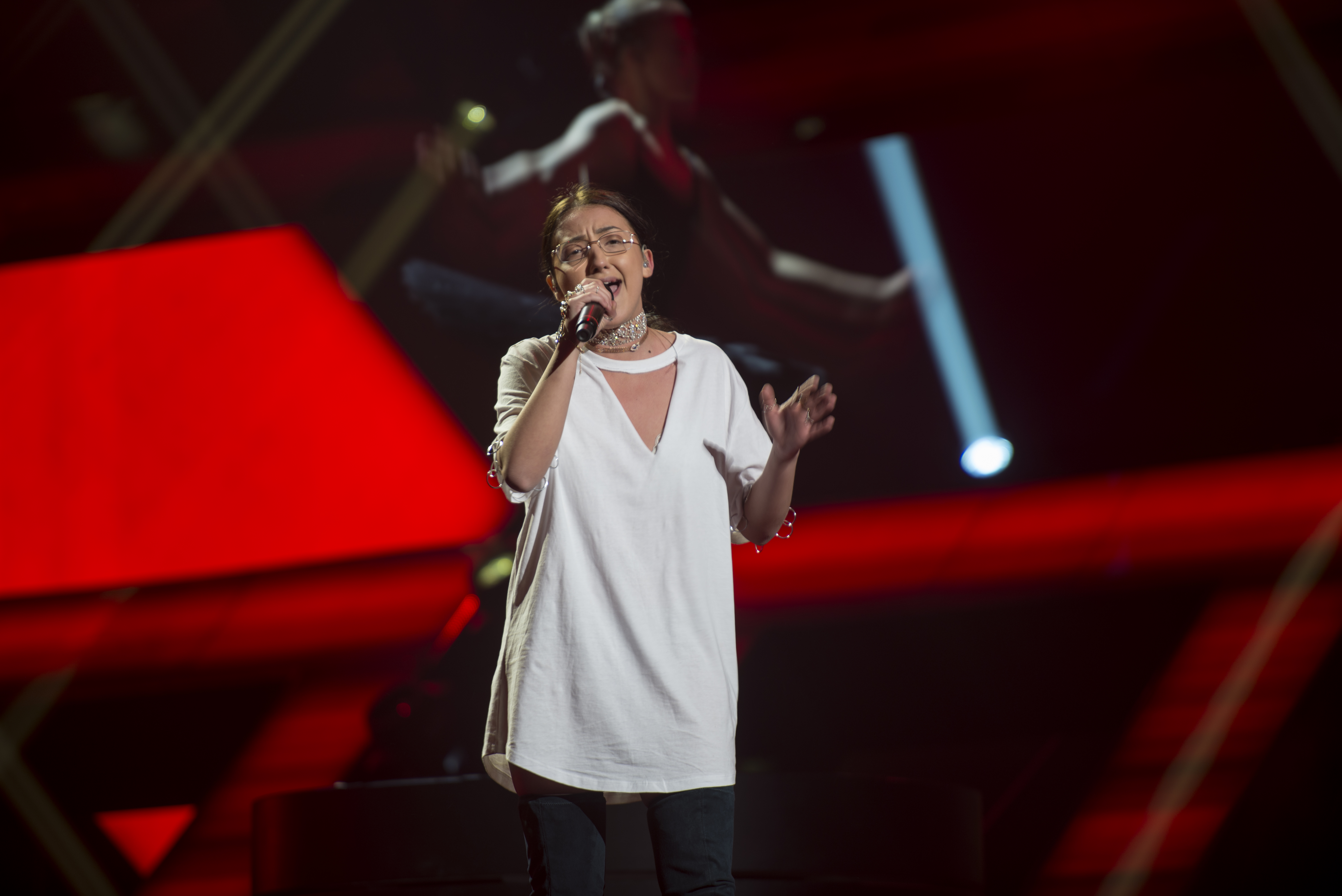
Adrijana during her first rehearsal for Melodifestivalen 2017

== Discography ==
=== Singles ===
Title	Year	Peak chart positions	Certifications	Album
Title	Year	SWE	Certifications	Album
"Mammas Opel"	2015	—		Non-album singles
"Boi"	2016	—		Non-album singles
"Det vi har" (featuring Jireel)	2016	—		Non-album singles
"Kan nt med mig"	2016	—		Non-album singles
"Nån som mig"	2017	—		Faser
"Amare"	2017	52		Faser
"Det är lugnt"	2017	—		Faser
"—" denotes a single that did not chart or was not released in that territory.
