= Robin Bengtsson =

Swedish pop singer

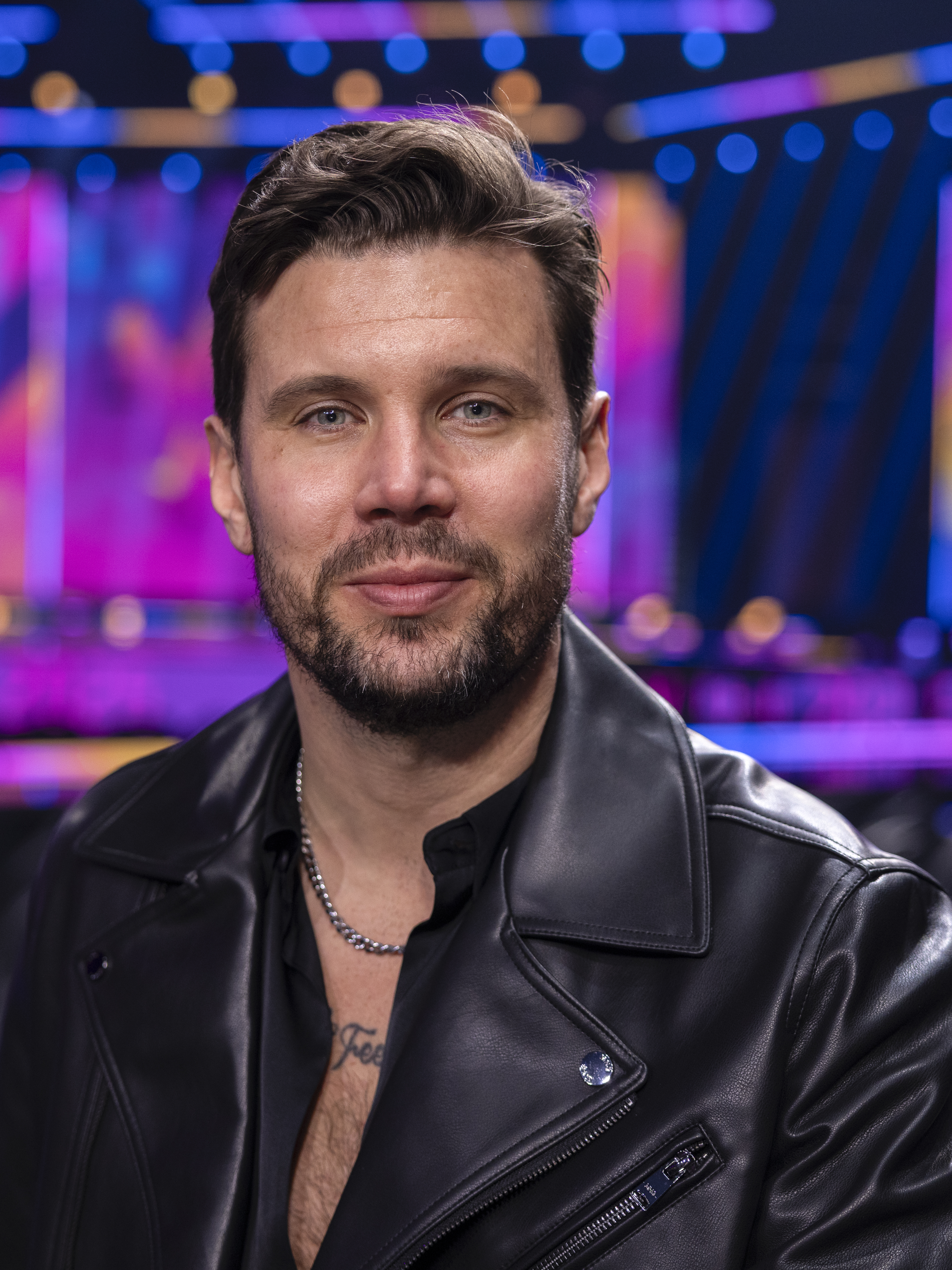
- Bengtsson during Melodifestivalen 2026

Background information
- Born: Hans Robin Gustav Bengtsson; 27 April 1990 (age 36); Svenljunga, Sweden
- Genre: Pop
- Occupation: Singer
- Years active: 2008–present
- Label: Reeflake Records

Robin Bengtsson (born 27 April 1990) is a Swedish singer who took part in Swedish Idol 2008. He represented Sweden in the Eurovision Song Contest 2017 with the song "I Can't Go On", finishing in fifth place.

== Career ==
Bengtsson was born in Svenljunga.

=== 2008–2016: Early work ===
Bengtsson finished third behind winner Kevin Borg and runner-up Alice Svensson in Idol 2008.

In mid-2009, Bengtsson was signed by Merion Music label releasing the single "Another Lover's Gone". Bengtsson was also a guest on the Katrin Zytomierska programs Idol 2008: Eftersnack and ZTV program Sexuellt.

In 2010, Bengtsson took part in the charity song "Wake Up World" for "Hjälp Haiti" with Karl Martindahl and Daniel "The Moniker" Karlsson and also performed the song "Long Long Night" with Kim Fransson (known from the TV reality program Made in Sweden.

Also in 2010, Bengtsson participated in the Swedish/Scandinavian version of Wipeout, reaching the final round and finishing second.

In 2016, Bengtsson participated in Melodifestivalen with the song "Constellation Prize" and placed fifth.

=== 2017: Eurovision ===
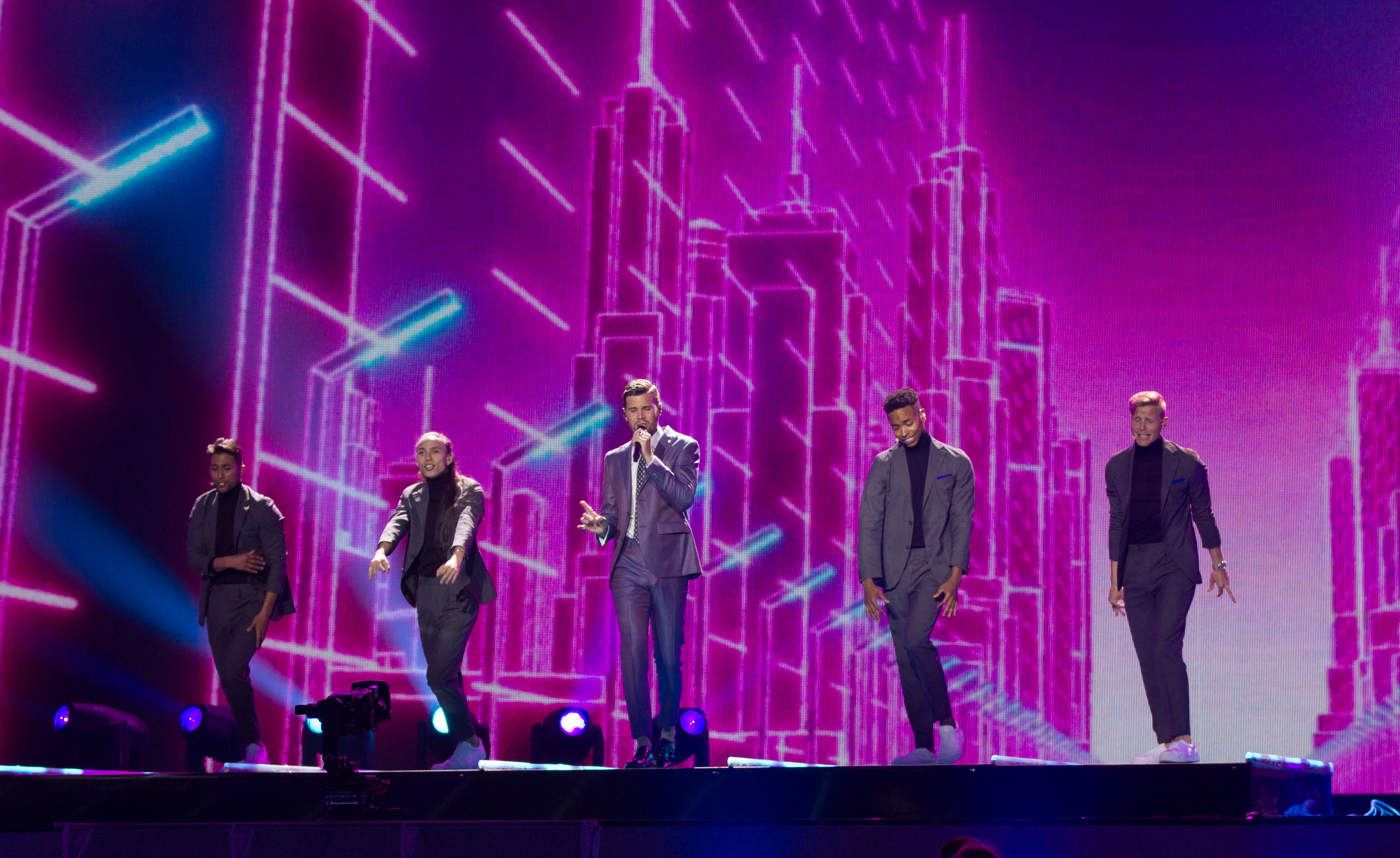
Bengtsson performing at Eurovision 2017.

Bengtsson came back in Melodifestivalen 2017 with the song "I Can't Go On" and won the competition. He represented Sweden in the Eurovision Song Contest 2017 in Kyiv.

Bengtsson performed in the first semi-final on 9 May 2017, and qualified for the final. In the final, he placed fifth.

=== 2019–present: Recent work ===
Bengtsson participated as a celebrity dancer in Let's Dance 2019, which was broadcast on TV4. Bengtsson's partner in the competition was Sigrid Bernson. The pair placed fifth overall.

Bengtsson took part in Melodifestivalen 2020 with the song "Take a Chance". He participated in the first semi-final of the competition, which took place in Linköping on 1 February 2020. Bengtsson qualified directly for the final in Stockholm, which took place on 7 March 2020. He finished in eighth place, scoring a total of 63 points.

Bengtsson returned to Melodifestivalen in 2022 with the song "Innocent Love". He came second in the first round on 5 February 2022, qualifying directly to the final. At the final on 12 March 2022, he finished in eleventh place with 34 points. The song went to #10 on the Swedish charts.

On 8 April 2023, Bengtsson was a special guest celebrity in the episode Drömsystrar of the Swedish language reality television series Drag Race Sverige broadcast on SVT1 and SVT Play.

Bengtsson is participating in Melodifestivalen 2026 with the song ”Honey Honey” and was performed in Heat 2, on 6 February. It qualified for the Final qualification round. It qualified on to the final where the song placed eleventh.

== Discography ==
Preceded by Frans with "If I Were Sorry"	Melodifestivalen winner 2017	Succeeded by Benjamin Ingrosso with "Dance You Off"
