= Boris Lumbana =

Congolese-born Swedish footballer and musician

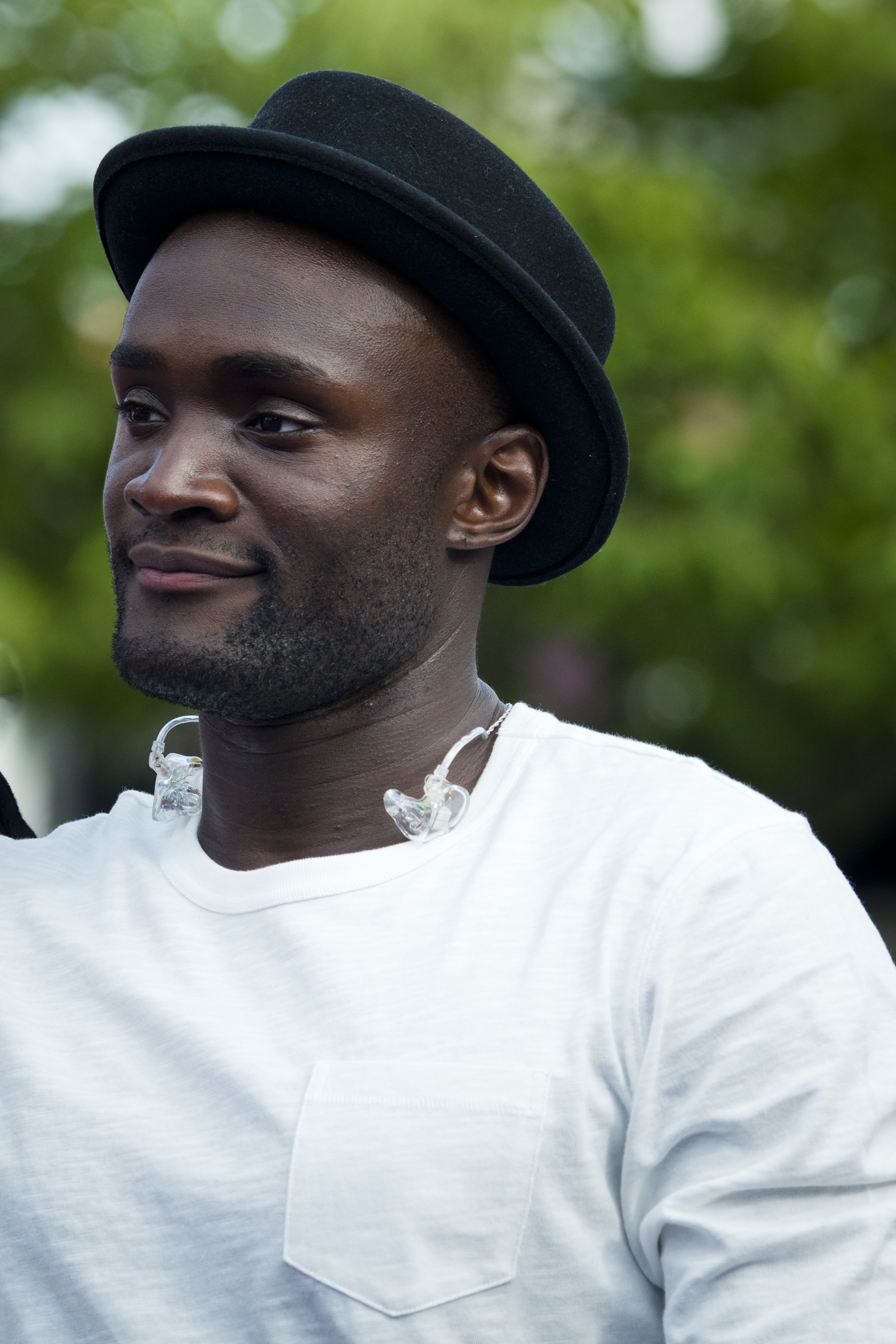
- Born: Boris René Lumbana Kapasa; 19 June 1991 (age 35); Kinshasa, Zaire
- Other name: Boris René
- Occupations: Footballer; singer
Association football career
- Height: 1.86 m (6 ft 1 in)
- Position: Defender
Youth career
- BK Forward
Senior career*
Years	Team	Apps	(Gls)
2008–2010	Örebro SK Ungdom	16	(0)
2010–2014	Örebro SK	14	(2)
2011	→ KA Akureyri (loan)	22	(0)
2015–2016	Degerfors IF	27	(1)
2019–2021	GAIS	62	(1)
- * Club domestic league appearances and goals as of 3 April 2016
Musical career
- Genres: Alternative pop; soul; R&B
- Occupation: Singer
- Years active: 2013–present
- Label: Giant
- Member of: Björnzone
- Website: www.borisrene.com

Boris René Lumbana Kapasa (born 19 June 1991) is a Congolese-born Swedish footballer and an alternative pop musician, using the stage name Boris René. Boris is currently playing for the Swedish football team GAIS.

== Sports career ==
Boris Lumbana is a defender who after spending his youth career at the Örebro-based Swedish football team BK Forward, has played professionally in a number of Swedish football clubs. He played for two seasons in the Swedish lower leagues with Örebro SK Ungdom in 2008 to 2010 and for 4 more seasons 2010 to 2014 for the club Örebro SK in the Swedish professional Allsvenskan league. In 2014, he moved to Degerfors IF in the second division Superettan league.

== Music career ==
Boris is also an alternative pop musician, using the stage name Boris René. He used to make music with his brothers from his childhood days. He released his first single "Alive" in 2013. He competed in Melodifestivalen 2016 with the song "Put Your Love on Me". He placed tenth in the final.

He competed in Melodifestivalen 2017 with the song "Her Kiss". In the first semi-final held on 4 February 2017, he came 3/4 and qualified for "Second chance" round. He then won his duel with Dismissed in the Andra Chansen round and then went to the final, which he placed 8th overall in.

== Personal life ==
His older brother Christian Lumbana Kapasa, played football in the Swedish lower leagues with Örebro SK Ungdom and Karlslunds IF, retiring in 2010.

== Discography ==
=== Singles ===
Title	Year	Peak chart positions	Certifications	Album
Title	Year	SWE	Certifications	Album
"Alive"	2013	—		Non-album singles
"Put Your Love on Me"	2016	12	GLF: Platinum	Non-album singles
"Mon Amour"	2016	—		Non-album singles
"Her Kiss"	2017	42		Non-album singles
"Give It to Me"	2018	—		Non-album singles
"—" denotes a single that did not chart or was not released in that territory.
