= Boogieman Blues =

Single by Owe Thörnqvist
- Released: 25 February 2017
- Recorded: 2016
- Genre: Blues; soul
- Length: 3:00
- Label: Metronome
- Songwriter: Owe Thörnqvist

Owe Thörnqvist singles chronology
"Kolibri och ollonborr" (2000)	"Boogieman Blues" (2017)

"Boogieman Blues" is a song written and recorded by Swedish singer Owe Thörnqvist. The song was released as a digital download in Sweden on 25 February 2017 and peaked at number 74 on the Swedish Singles Chart. It took part in Melodifestivalen 2017, and qualified to the final from the third semi-final on 18 February 2017.

== Track listing ==
Digital download
No.	Title	Length
1.	"Boogieman Blues"	3:00

== Chart performance ==
=== Weekly charts ===
Chart (2017)	Peak position
Sweden (Sverigetopplistan)	74

== Release history ==
Region	Date	Format	Label
Sweden	25 February 2017	Digital download	Metronome
