= Amare (Adrijana song) =

Single by Adrijana
- Released: 26 February 2017
- Recorded: 2016
- Genre: Hip hop; pop; R&B; electronic
- Length: 2:50
- Label: Universal Music Sweden
- Songwriters: Adrijana Krasniqi; Martin Tjärnberg

Adrijana singles chronology
"Nån som mig" (2017)	"Amare" (2017)

"Amare" is a song recorded by Swedish rapper Adrijana. The song was released as a digital download in Sweden on 26 February 2017, and peaked at number 52 on the Swedish Singles Chart. It took part in Melodifestivalen 2017, and placed sixth in the first semi-final on 4 February 2017, and was written by Adrijana and Martin Tjärnberg.

== Track listing ==
Digital download
No.	Title	Length
1.	"Amare"	2:50

== Chart performance ==
=== Weekly charts ===
Chart (2017)	Peak positions
Sweden (Sverigetopplistan)	52

== Release history ==
Region	Date	Format	Label
Sweden	26 February 2017	Digital download	Universal Music Sweden
