= Kiss You Goodbye =

Single by Anton Hagman
- Released: 26 February 2017
- Recorded: 2016
- Genre: Pop
- Length: 2:59
- Label: Universal Music Sweden
- Songwriter(s): Christian Fast; Tim Schou; Henrik Nordenback

Anton Hagman singles chronology
"Kiss You Goodbye" (2017)	"Somebody to Love" (2017)

"Kiss You Goodbye" is a song recorded by Swedish singer Anton Hagman. The song was released as a digital download in Sweden on 26 February 2017 and peaked at number 17 on the Swedish Singles Chart. It is taking part in Melodifestivalen 2017, and qualified to andra chansen from the third semi-final on 18 February 2017. The song qualified to the final from andra chansen on 4 March 2017. It was written by Christian Fast, Tim Schou, and Henrik Nordenback.

== Track listing ==
Digital download
No.	Title	Length
1.	"Kiss You Goodbye"	2:59

== Chart performance ==
=== Weekly charts ===
Chart (2017)	Peak position
Sweden (Sverigetopplistan)	13

== Release history ==
Region	Date	Format	Label
Sweden	26 February 2017	Digital download	Universal Music Sweden
