= I Don't Give A (Lisa Ajax song) =

Single by Lisa Ajax
- Released: 26 February 2017
- Recorded: 2016
- Genre: Pop
- Length: 2:59
- Label: Capitol Music Group Sweden
- Songwriter(s): Ola Svensson; Linnea Deb; Joy Deb; Anton Hård af Segerstad

Lisa Ajax singles chronology
"Love Me Wicked" (2016)	"I Don't Give A" (2017)	"Number One" (2017)

"I Don't Give A" is a song recorded by Swedish singer Lisa Ajax. The song was released as a digital download in Sweden on 26 February 2017 and peaked at number 25 on the Swedish Singles Chart. It is taking part in Melodifestivalen 2017, and qualified to andra chansen from the second semi-final on 11 February 2017. The song qualified from andra chansen on 4 March 2017. It was written by Ola Svensson, Linnea Deb, Joy Deb, and Anton Hård af Segerstad.

== Track listing ==
Digital download
No.	Title	Length
1.	"I Don't Give A"	2:59

== Chart performance ==
Chart (2017)	Peak positions
Sweden (Sverigetopplistan)	25

== Release history ==
Region	Date	Format	Label
Sweden	26 February 2017	Digital download	Capitol Music Group Sweden
