= Owe Thörnqvist =

Musical artist

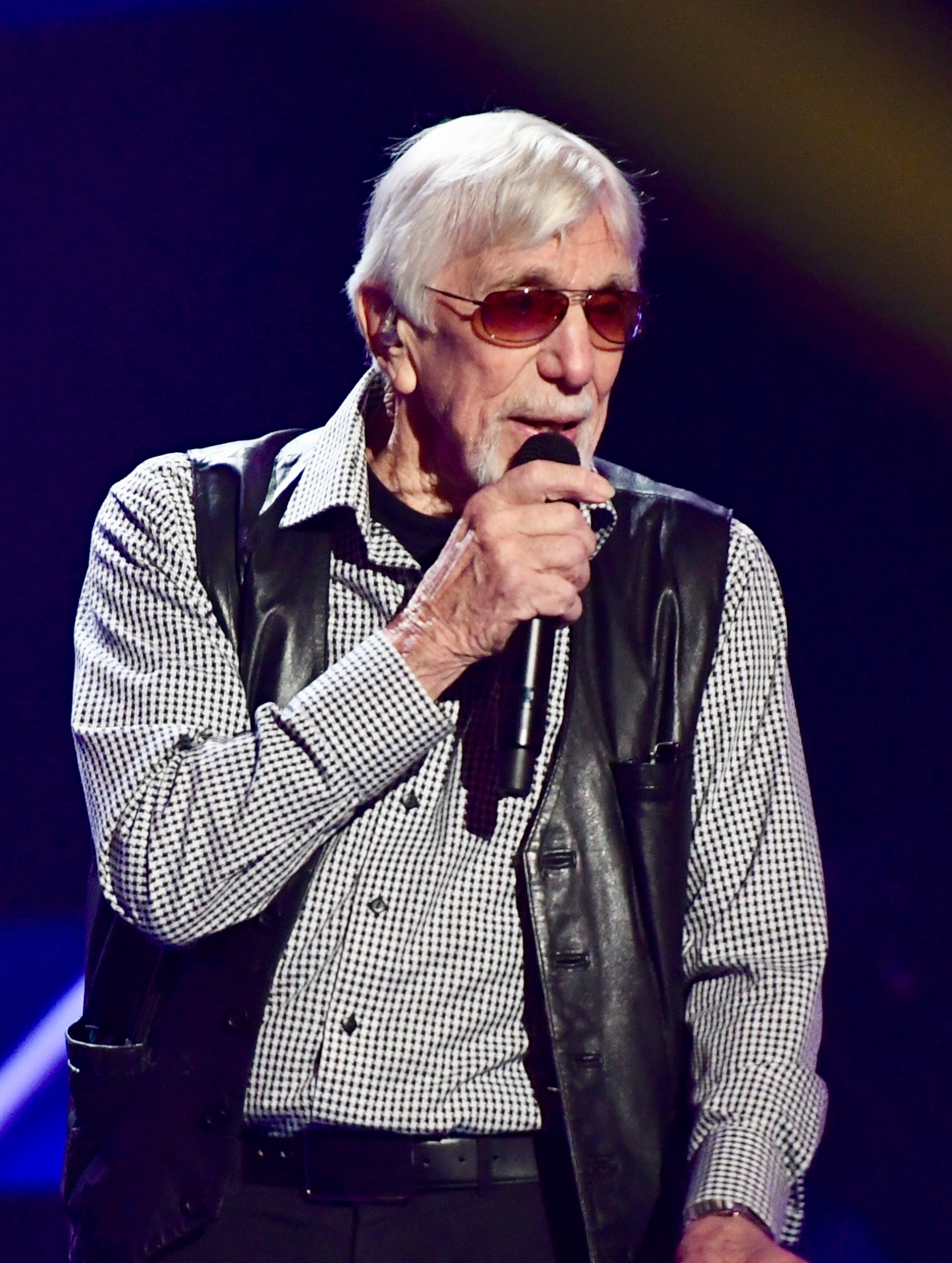
- Thörnqvist in 2016

Background information
- Born: 12 March 1929 (age 96); Uppsala, Sweden
- Genres: Pop, rock, schlager
- Occupations: Singer, songwriter, musician
- Years active: 1953–

Owe Thörnqvist (born 12 March 1929) is a Swedish singer-songwriter and revue artist. Since the 1960s he has lived in Spain and Florida in the winter for health reasons, and in Sweden in the summers. He has also made regular concert tours in Sweden.

In 1953, Thörnqvist produced his first revue in Uppsala, and in 1955 his first record was released. His musical style includes rock, ballroom rumba and calypso, and he has also written pastiches of American popular music; his texts are characterised by word play and humour.

Thörnqvist was one of the first people to do stand-up comedy in Sweden, in venues such as Hamburger Börs and Berns in Stockholm in the 1950s. He has worked together with artists such as Povel Ramel (in the revue I hatt och strumpa in 1961–62), Anita Lindblom, Lill Lindfors, and Eva Rydberg. In 1963, Thörnqvist provided guest vocals and performed the song "Wilma" on The Flintstones episode "The Swedish Visitors".

Thörnqvist wrote songs for the song contest Melodifestivalen, the Swedish qualifying contest for the Eurovision Song Contest in 1962, 1963 and 1965. In 2017, he took part in the contest as a singer, with the song "Boogieman Blues". Aged 87, Thörnqvist was the oldest person ever to perform in Melodifestivalen at that time. His performance won the semi-finals, but did not qualify for the Eurovision Song Contest.

In 2004, Thörnqvist received H. M. The King's Medal in the 8th size for his contributions to Swedish culture as a songwriter, singer and composer. He has also received the Evert Taube prize (Evert Taube-stipendiet) and the Cornelis Vreeswijk prize (Cornelis Vreeswijk-stipendiet).
