= Nano Omar =

Swedish singer and songwriter

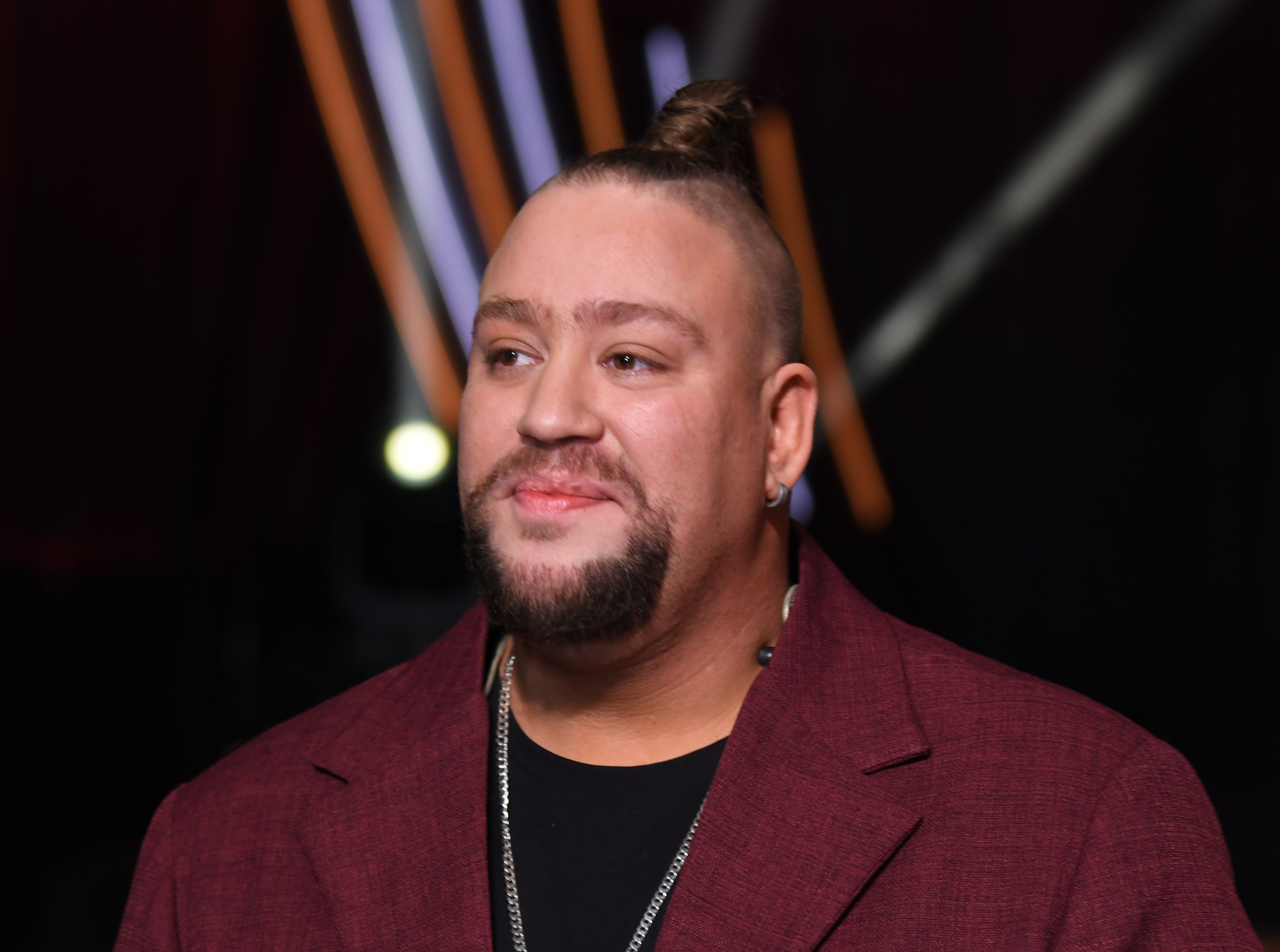
- Nano Omar in 2019

Background information
- Born: 16 December 1986 (age 39); Botkyrka, Sweden
- Genres: Pop; R&B
- Occupations: singer; songwriter
- Instruments: Vocals; synthesizer
- Years active: 2015–present

Nagi Jamal Omar (born 16 December 1986), better known as simply Nano, is a Swedish singer and songwriter. He first came to prominence while competing in Melodifestivalen 2017.

== Life and career ==
=== Early life and personal life ===
Omar was born on 16 December 1986 in Tumba, Botkyrka, Stockholm. His father is Palestinian, while his mother is from Åland. At age 12, he moved to a foster home in Gotland. When his mother visited him for the first time since moving in, she gave him a synthesizer, which influenced his decision to focus on music.

He was arrested at age 18, and went to jail. When he was 21, he ended up in jail once again and thereafter was also informed that his girlfriend was pregnant with their child; Because of this, he decided to focus on his family and resume his musical career. He is now divorced.

=== 2015–present: Career breakthrough and Melodifestivalen 2017 ===
In the spring of 2015, he released his debut single "Lion". In 2017, he began competing in Melodifestivalen 2017, the Swedish national selection for the Eurovision Song Contest 2017 with the song "Hold On". He progressed directly to the final from the first-semi-final. In the final he placed second overall, being the winner of the televoting and second in the jury voting.

He participated in Melodifestivalen 2019 with the song "Chasing Rivers".

== Discography ==
=== Singles ===
| Title | Year | Peak chart positions | Album |
| Title | Year | SWE | Album |
|---|---|---|---|
| "Lion" | 2015 | — | Non-album singles |
| "Hold On" | 2017 | 4 | Non-album singles |
| "Chasing Rivers" | 2019 | 14 | Non-album singles |
"—" denotes a single that did not chart or was not released.
