= Anton Hagman =

Swedish singer (born 1998)

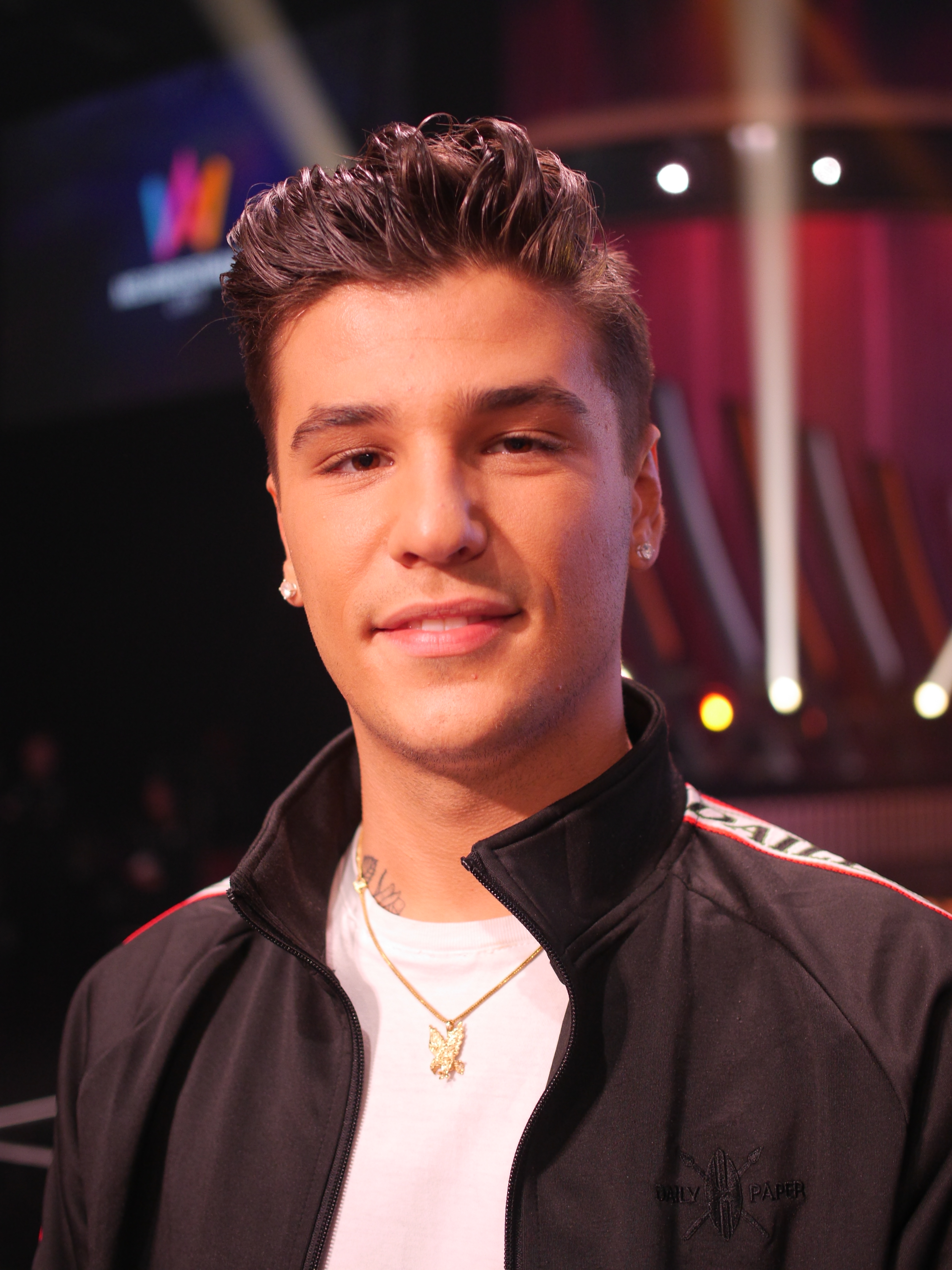
- Hagman at Melodifestivalen 2019

Background information
- Born: Anton Per Erik Hagman; 8 September 1998 (age 27); Västerås, Sweden
- Genres: Pop
- Occupation: singer
- Instruments: Vocals; guitar; piano
- Years active: 2012–present

Anton Per Erik Hagman (born 8 September 1998) is a Swedish singer. He competed in Melodifestivalen 2017 with the song "Kiss You Goodbye". On 18 February 2017, he advanced from the third semi-final to andra chansen, from which he qualified for the final where he placed tenth. Hagman also participated in Melodifestivalen 2019, with the song "Känner dig".

== Discography ==
=== Extended plays ===
Title	Details
Acoustic Sessions, Pt. 1	Released: February 16, 2017; Label: Universal Music Sweden; Format: digital download, streaming
From Now On	Released: June 9, 2017; Label: Universal Music Sweden; Format: digital download, streaming
Studio Outtakes 1	Released: November 24, 2017; Label: Universal Music Sweden; Format: digital download, streaming

=== Singles ===
Title	Year	Peak chart positions	Certifications	Album
Title	Year	SWE	Certifications	Album
"Kiss You Goodbye"	2017	13	GLF: Platinum	Non-album singles
"Somebody to Love"	2017	—		From Now On
"Running in the Dark"	2018	—		Non-album singles
"Tiotusenmetersklubben"	2018	—		Non-album singles
"Känner dig"	2019	79		Melodifestivalen 2019
"Har du tid?"	2019	—		TBA
"Så finner vi varann"	2020	—		TBA
"Ingen annan"	2020	—		TBA
