= Lotta på Liseberg =

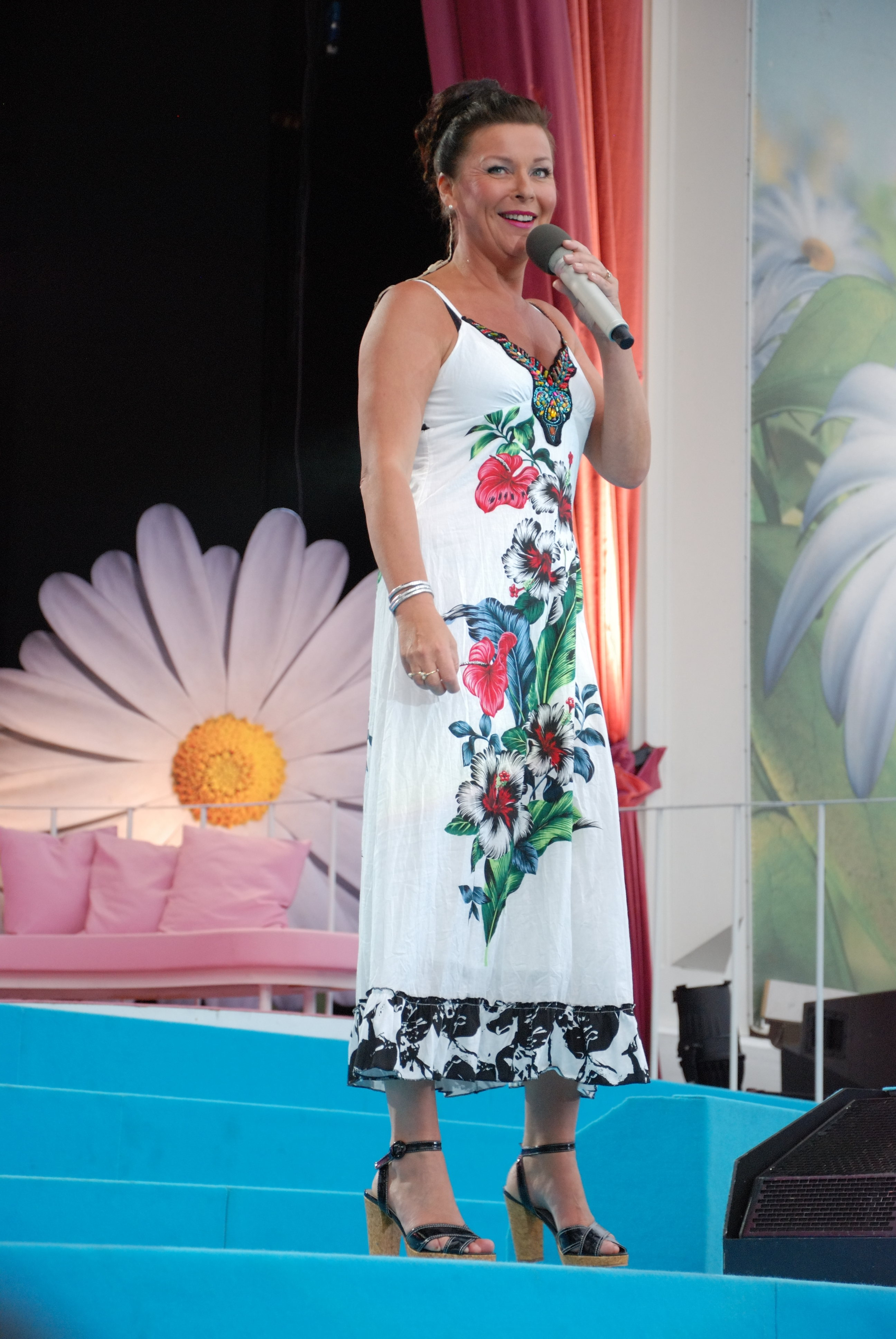
- Lotta på Liseberg
- Presented by: Lotta Engberg
- Country of origin: Sweden
- Original language: Swedish
- No. of seasons: 10

Production
- Executive producer: Jonathan Nordin
- Producers: Andréas Johansson; Ulf A Barthel
- Production locations: Liseberg, Gothenburg
- Running time: 90 min
- Production companies: Eyeworks (2009–2014); Warner Bros. Television (2015–2023)

Original release
- Network: TV 4
- Release: 11 August 2014 – 7 August 2023

Lotta på Liseberg (Lotta at Liseberg), also called Allsång på Liseberg (Sing-along at Liseberg), was a Swedish sing-along show held at Stora scenen at the amusement park Liseberg in Gothenburg every Monday evening during the summers since 2004, hosted by Lotta Engberg and conducted by Curt-Eric Holmquist, the pianist. It was produced by Eyeworks. 2009-2023 it was broadcast by TV4. In 2023 TV4 announced that the show was ending in compliance with Lotta's own request.

== Jul-Lotta på Liseberg ==
In December 2005 a winter sing-along show called Jul-Lotta på Liseberg (Christmas-Lotta at Liseberg) started ("Jul-Lotta"="Julotta + Lotta"). It has been broadcast by TV4 since 2011. The intro-song is "Hej, mitt vinterland" and the outro-song "O Holy Night" (O helga natt in Swedish). The show is broadcast on Sundays during the Christmas time and there are 4 programs.

== See also ==
- Allsång på Skansen
