= De Vet Du =

Swedish music group formed in 2010

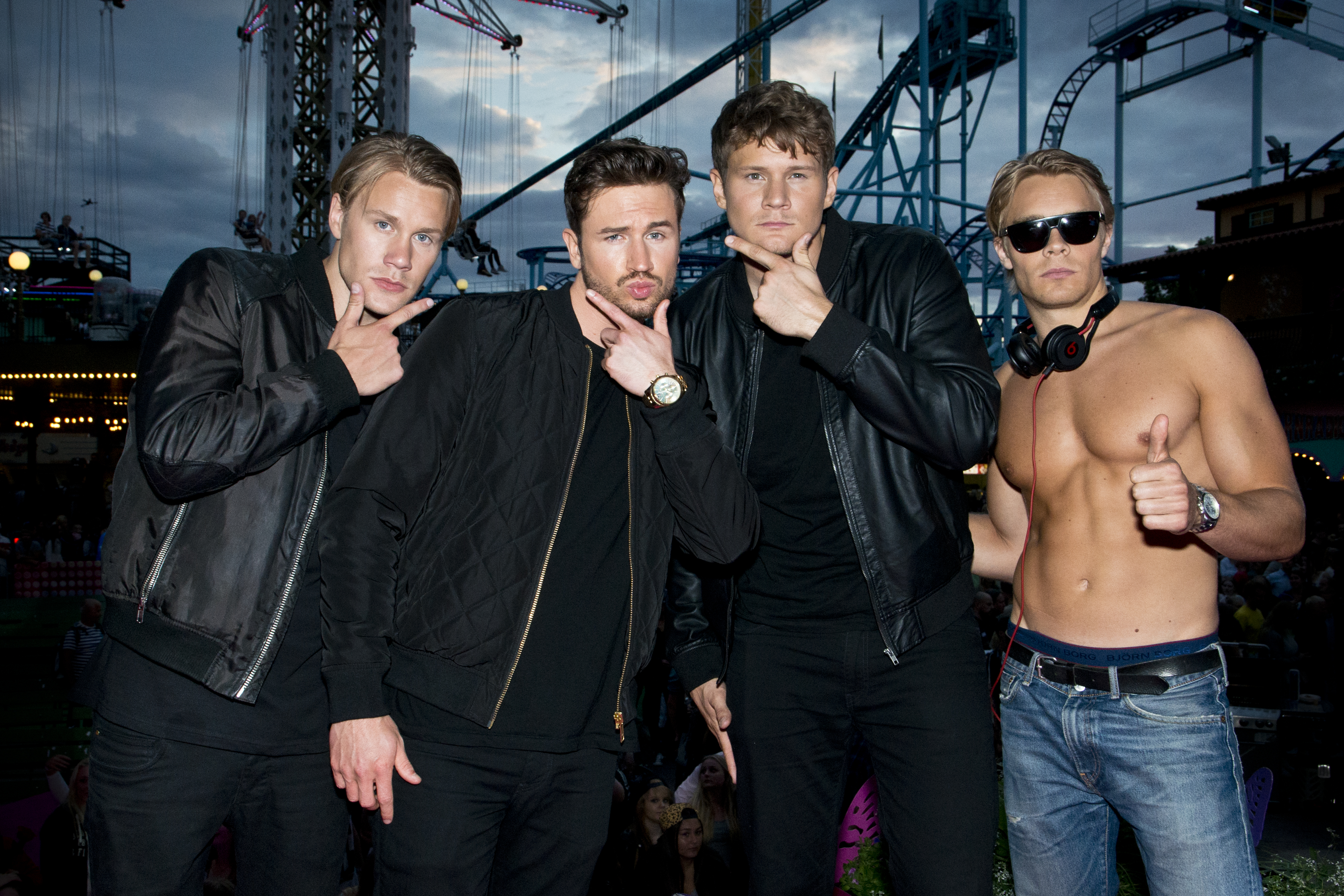
- De Vet Du in 2015.

Background information
- Origin: Lidingö, Sweden
- Genres: Pop, comedy
- Years active: 2010-present
- Labels: Universal Music (? - 2018); Giant Records (2018-)
- Members: Christopher Martland (born 1989); Johan Gunterberg (born 1988); DJ Hunk
- Past members: Tor Wallin (born 1990)
- Website: www.devetdu.se

De Vet Du ("You Know It" in Swedish) is a Swedish music group formed in 2010 mixing humor and sarcasm in their music. De Vet Du, or at times De vet du started in Lidingö, a suburb of Stockholm by four friends Christopher Martland, Johan Gunterberg, Tor Wallin, and the so-called "DJ Hunk". They were signed to Universal Music Sweden, but are now signed to Giant Records.

== Career ==
Originally the members started online, mainly on YouTube, where they uploaded humorous videos under the title "Lidingobladet" and soon became online sensations. Moving to music and humor they posted their first video "Dansa Är Kul (Men Jag Föredrar Å Supa)" (meaning "Dancing is fun, but I prefer to drink" in Swedish). With further, quite often risqué titles and explicit lyrics (particularly when heard in other languages), they released their debut album Shit Va Pin in 2012 and from that album their charting hit "Fucka Ur", which charted on Sverigetopplistan, the official Swedish Singles chart. It was followed up by another charting single, "Kär i en kändis", in 2013.

Their regular online postings, filled with tongue in cheek humor, puns and self-deprecating hilarious criticism of social phenomena, attracted a big following. These include releases such as "BoyBand", the album Shit Va Pin, "Hon va en han", "Sture P", "Bågar Utan Glas" and "Din Syrra". They also cooperate with other people and habitually feature them in their music videos, like in "Haterz", featuring Robert Aschberg and "Dansa Är Kul (Men Jag Föredrar Å Supa)" featuring Robin Svensson, etc. In November 2026, Wallin announced he was leaving the group.

== In popular culture ==
De Vet Du is featured in Björn Borg commercials, particularly the memorable "Boxers or Briefs" series.

== Discography ==
=== Studio albums ===
| Title | Details | Peak chart positions | Certifications |
| Title | Details | SWE | Certifications |
|---|---|---|---|
| Shit va pin | Released: 27 July 2012; Label: One Brain AB, Universal Music Sweden | — | |
| RadioMusik | Released: 14 February 2014; Label: One Brain AB, Universal Music Sweden | 16 | GLF: Gold |
| Skip Rate | Released: 18 August 2017; Label: One Brain AB, Universal Music Sweden | — | |
| Geting, Beats & Sport | Released: 19 April 2020; Label: Redrum Records | 33 | |
| Bella Festa | Released: 31 May 2024; Label: One Brain AB | — | |
"—" denotes an album that did not chart or was not released.

=== Extended plays ===
| Title | Year | Peak chart positions |
| Title | Year | SWE |
|---|---|---|
| Geting | 2020 | 39 |

=== Singles ===
| Title | Year | Peak chart positions | Certifications | Album |
| Title | Year | SWE | Certifications | Album |
|---|---|---|---|---|
| "Shit va pin" | 2012 | — | | Shit va pin |
| "Fucka ur" | 2012 | 52 | GLF: 2× Platinum | RadioMusik |
| "BoyBand" | 2012 | — | | RadioMusik |
| "Kär i en kändis" | 2013 | 56 | GLF: Gold | RadioMusik |
| "Haterz" (featuring Robert Aschberg) | 2013 | — | | RadioMusik |
| "Den kan inte stå" | 2013 | — | | RadioMusik |
| "Klä av dig naken" | 2014 | 29 | GLF: Platinum | RadioMusik |
| "Pantamera" | 2014 | — | | Skip Rate |
| "Swag i skogen" (featuring Alejandro Fuentes-Bergström) | 2014 | 59 | GLF: Gold | Skip Rate |
| "Fy fan va stek" | 2015 | 6 | GLF: 2× Platinum | Skip Rate |
| "Dansa som kungen" | 2015 | 59 | GLF: Gold | Skip Rate |
| "Shadez inomhus" (featuring Björn Gustafsson) | 2016 | — | | Skip Rate |
| "k.R.e.D.d" | 2016 | — | | Skip Rate |
| "Road Trip" | 2017 | 9 | GLF: Platinum | Skip Rate |
| "Som MJ (Beatörta)" | 2017 | — | | Skip Rate |
| "Vi sjunger" | 2018 | 19 | | Geting, Beats & Sport |
| "Profil" | 2018 | 21 | | Geting, Beats & Sport |
| "Höjer våra glas" | 2019 | 12 | | Geting, Beats & Sport |
| "Killkompis" | 2020 | — (Note: "Killkompis" did not enter the Swedish Singellista Chart, but peaked at number seven on the Swedish Heatseeker Chart.) | | Geting, Beats & Sport |
| "Fira varje stund" | 2021 | 57 | | Bella Festa |
| "Tjalala" | 2021 | — (Note: "Tjalala" did not enter the Swedish Singellista Chart, but peaked at number five on the Swedish Heatseeker Chart.) | | Bella Festa |
| "Brände hela lönen" (with Bolaget) | 2021 | 57 | | Non-album single |
| "Gubbs 4 Ever" | 2021 | 69 | | Bella Festa |
| "VIP" | 2022 | — | | Bella Festa |
| "Supa" (with Bolaget) | 2022 | 14 | | Bella Festa |
| "Första gången i en EPA" (with B3nte and Ringnes-Ronny) | 2023 | 16 | | Bella Festa |
| "Höjer våra glas igen" (with Rasmus Gozzi and Fröken Snusk) | 2023 | 27 | | Non-album single |
| "Zlatan Ibrahimović" | 2023 | — | | Bella Festa |
| "Dyngnacke" | 2023 | — (Note: "Dyngnacke" did not enter the Swedish Singellista Chart, but peaked at number nine on the Swedish Heatseeker Chart.) | | Bella Festa |
| "Boyband Comeback" | 2024 | — | | Bella Festa |
| "Holiday" (with Dr. Alban) | 2024 | — | | Bella Festa |
| "Tänk om vi var gay" (with Edvin Törnblom) | 2024 | 33 | | Non-album singles |
| "Ta mig aldrig härifrån" (with Victor Leksell) | 2025 | 4 | | Non-album singles |
| "Nu kommer alla jullåtar" | 2025 | 18 | | Non-album singles |
| "Stockholmstjej" | 2026 | — (Note: "Stockholmstjej" did not enter the Swedish Singellista Chart, but peaked at number nine on the Swedish Heatseeker Chart.) | | Non-album singles |
| "Kanna på" (with Gula Väggen) | 2026 | 15 | | Non-album singles |
| "Meteor" | 2026 | 32 | | Non-album singles |
"—" denotes a single that did not chart or was not released.

=== Other charted songs ===
| Title | Year | Peak chart positions | Album |
| Title | Year | SWE | Album |
|---|---|---|---|
| "Gubbs" | 2020 | — (Note: While "Gubbs" did not enter the Swedish Singles Chart, it peaked at number seven on the Swedish Heatseeker Chart.) | Geting, Beats & Sport |
| "Bäng" | 2020 | — (Note: While "Bäng" did not enter the Swedish Singles Chart, it peaked at number 14 on the Swedish Heatseeker Chart.) | Geting, Beats & Sport |
