= Hold On (Nano song) =

Single by Nano
- Released: 26 February 2017
- Recorded: 2016
- Genre: Pop; R&B; soul; breakbeat
- Length: 3:18
- Label: Parlophone Music Sweden
- Songwriters: Nano; Gino Yonan; Ayak Thiik; Carl Rydén; Christoffer Belaieff; Rikard de Bruin; David Francis Jackson

Nano singles chronology
"Lion" (2015)	"Hold On" (2017)	"Chasing Rivers" (2019)

"Hold On" is a song recorded by Swedish singer Nano. The song was released as a digital download in Sweden on 26 February 2017 and peaked at number 4 on the Swedish Singles Chart. It took part in Melodifestivalen 2017, and qualified to the final from the first semi-final on 4 February 2017. It was written by Nano, Gino Yonan, Ayak Thiik, Carl Rydén, Christoffer Belaieff, Rikard de Bruin, Johan Röhr and David Francis Jackson.

== Track listing ==
Digital download
No.	Title	Length
1.	"Hold On"	3:18

== Chart performance ==
=== Weekly charts ===
Chart (2017–18)	Peak position
Finland Download (Latauslista)	21
Sweden (Sverigetopplistan)	4
Switzerland (Schweizer Hitparade)	5

== Certifications ==
Region	Certification	Certified units/sales
Switzerland (IFPI Switzerland)	Gold	10,000^{‡}
^{‡} Sales+streaming figures based on certification alone.

== Music video ==
The music video for "Hold On" was released July 28, 2017. As of February 2021 the video has over two million views on YouTube . The video was recorded in Los Angeles and is produced by Prince Jackson, son of Michael Jackson. The music video was directed by Christopher Perez.

The music video handles the topic of perseverance in the face of adversity. The lyrics encourage the listener to have patience, and hold on; likewise, the three main characters in the music video face difficulties, and are encouraged to keep trying and hold on even when facing difficulties and possible failure.

The video starts with a car accident. A man is removing a younger man from the passenger seat of the car. The young man is credited as "Boy", played by Duane Ervin, and later referred to as Andrew. He is suffering grave injuries from the car accident. The music video shows him as he undergoes painful physiotherapy, operating his legs again, and then using a wheelchair. A nurse is helping him through the physiotherapy, and his father encourages him to hold on through the video.

The second character is credited as "Boxer", played by David Thomas and later referred to by the same name. The music video is following him as he trains for an important championship match. The Boxer is the underdog in the upcoming match, however, he doesn't give up and keeps training harder and harder, attempting to win. We also learn the Boxer is the man who saved the Boy from the car accident, and this connection gives the Boxer the necessary motivation to win the championship belt.

The third and final character is credited as "Girl", played by Natasha Ivkovic. We follow her as she makes a significant change in her life, moving to a new apartment. It is evidently hard for her to make a new life for herself.

== Release history ==
Region	Date	Format	Label
Sweden	26 February 2017	Digital download	Parlophone Music Sweden
