= Sweden in the Eurovision Song Contest 2016 =

- Eurovision Song Contest 2016
- Participating broadcaster: Sveriges Television (SVT)
- Country: Sweden
- Selection process: Melodifestivalen 2016
- Selection date: 12 March 2016

Competing entry
- Song: "If I Were Sorry"
- Artist: Frans
- Songwriters: Oscar Fogelström; Michael Saxell; Fredrik Andersson; Frans Jeppsson Wall

Placement
- Final result: 5th, 261 points

Participation chronology

Sweden was represented at the Eurovision Song Contest 2016 with the song "If I Were Sorry", written by Oscar Fogelström, Michael Saxell, Fredrik Andersson, and Frans Jeppsson Wall, and performed by Frans himself. The Swedish participating broadcaster, Sveriges Television (SVT), selected its entry through Melodifestivalen 2016. In addition, SVT was also the host broadcaster and staged the event at the Globe Arena in Stockholm, after winning the previous edition with the song "Heroes" performed by Måns Zelmerlöw.

After a six-week-long competition consisting of four heats, a Second Chance round and a final, "If I Were Sorry" performed by Frans emerged as the winner of the Melodifestivalen 2016 after achieving the highest score following the combination of votes from eleven international jury groups and a public vote.

As the host country, Sweden qualified to compete directly in the final of the Eurovision Song Contest. Sweden's running order position was determined by draw. Performing in position 9 during the final, Sweden placed fifth out of the 26 participating countries with 261 points.

== Background ==
Prior to the 2016 contest, Sveriges Radio (SR) until 1979, and Sveriges Television (SVT) since 1980, had participated in the Eurovision Song Contest representing Sweden fifty-five times since SR's first entry in 1958. They had won the contest on six occasions: in 1974 with the song "Waterloo" performed by ABBA, in 1984 with the song "Diggi-Loo Diggi-Ley" performed by Herreys, in 1991 with the song "Fångad av en stormvind" performed by Carola, in 1999 with the song "Take Me to Your Heaven" performed by Charlotte Nilsson, in 2012 with the song "Euphoria" performed by Loreen, and in 2015 with the song "Heroes" performed by Måns Zelmerlöw. Following the introduction of semi-finals for the 2004, the Swedish entries, to this point, have featured in every final except for 2010 when they failed to qualify.

As part of its duties as participating broadcaster, SVT organises the selection of its entry in the Eurovision Song Contest and broadcasts the event in the country. Since 1959, SR first and SVT later have organised the annual competition Melodifestivalen in order to select their entries for the contest.

== Before Eurovision ==
=== Melodifestivalen 2016 ===
Melodifestivalen 2016 was the Swedish music competition that selected their entry for the Eurovision Song Contest 2016. 28 songs were initially selected to compete, however, after a disqualification, 27 ultimately competed in a six-week-long process which consisted of four heats on 6, 13, 20 and 27 February 2016, a second chance round on 5 March 2016, and a final on 12 March 2016. The six shows were hosted by Gina Dirawi, who was joined by guest hosts during each show: Petra Mede (heat 1), Henrik Schyffert (heat 3), Sarah Dawn Finer (heat 4), Peter Jöback (Second Chance round), Ola Salo (Second Chance round) and William Spetz (final); Charlotte Perrelli was originally supposed to host the second heat, however, due to a conflict of interest concerning her endorsement deal with Swedish mobile brand Comviq, she was demoted to a guest performer. Seven songs competed in each heat—the top two qualified directly to the final, while the third and fourth placed songs qualified to the second chance round. The bottom three songs in each heat were eliminated from the competition. An additional four songs qualified to the final from the second chance round. The results in the heats and second chance round were determined exclusively by public televote and app voting, while the overall winner of the competition was selected in the final through the combination of a public vote and the votes from eleven international jury groups. Among the competing artists were former Eurovision Song Contest contestants Tommy Nilsson who represented Sweden in 1989, Martin Stenmarck who represented Sweden in 2005 and Krista Siegfrids who represented Finland in 2013. Molly Sandén represented Sweden in the Junior Eurovision Song Contest 2006.

==== Heats and Second Chance round ====
- The first heat took place on 6 February 2016 at the Scandinavium in Gothenburg. "Constellation Prize" performed by Robin Bengtsson and "Don't Worry" performed by Ace Wilder qualified directly to the final, while "Bada nakna" performed by Samir and Viktor and "Rik" performed by Albin and Mattias advanced to the Second Chance round. "Mitt guld" performed by Pernilla Andersson and "Ain't No Good" performed by Mimi Werner were both eliminated from the contest. Two days prior to the semi-final on 4 February, "Himmel för två", performed by Anna Book, was disqualified after it was discovered that the song had previously been entered and performed in the audition round of the 2014 Moldovan Eurovision Song Contest national selection in English as "Taking Care of a Broken Heart".
- The second heat took place on 13 February 2016 at the Malmö Arena in Malmö. "Save Me" performed by Wiktoria and "We Are Your Tomorrow" performed by David Lindgren qualified directly to the final, while "I Will Wait" performed by Isa and "Hunger" performed by Molly Pettersson Hammar advanced to the Second Chance round. "100%" performed by Victor och Natten, "Faller" performed by Krista Siegfrids, and "Håll mitt hjärta hårt" performed by Patrik, Tommy and Uno were eliminated.
- The third heat took place on 20 February 2016 at the Himmelstalundshallen in Norrköping. "My Heart Wants Me Dead" performed by Lisa Ajax and "Human" performed by Oscar Zia qualified directly to the final, while "Put Your Love on Me" performed by Boris René and "Kizunguzungu" performed by SaRaha advanced to the Second Chance round. "You Carved Your Name" performed by Swingfly feat. Helena Gutarra, "Weight of the World" performed by Smilo, and "Kom ut som en stjärna" performed by After Dark were eliminated.
- The fourth heat took place on 27 February 2016 at the Gavlerinken Arena in Gävle. "If I Were Sorry" performed by Frans and "Youniverse" performed by Molly Sandén qualified directly to the final, while "Håll om mig hårt" performed by Panetoz and "Rollercoaster" performed by Dolly Style advanced to the Second Chance round. "Runaways" performed by Eclipse, "Du tar mig tillbaks" performed by Martin Stenmarck, and "Killer Girl" performed by Linda Bengtzing were eliminated.
- The Second Chance round (Andra chansen) took place on 5 March 2016 at the Halmstad Arena in Halmstad. "Håll om mig hårt" performed by Panetoz, "Put Your Love on Me" performed by Boris René, "Kizunguzungu" performed by SaRaha, and "Bada nakna" performed by Samir and Viktor qualified to the final.

==== Final ====
The final was held on 12 March 2016 at the Friends Arena in Stockholm. Twelve songs competed—two qualifiers from each of the four preceding heats and four qualifiers from the Second Chance round. The combination of points from a viewer vote and eleven international jury groups determined the winner. The viewers and the juries each had a total of 473 points to award. The nations that comprised the international jury were Australia, Belarus, Bosnia and Herzegovina, Cyprus, Estonia, France, Israel, Italy, the Netherlands, Norway and Slovenia. "If I Were Sorry" performed by Frans was selected as the winner with 156 points.

R/O	Artist	Song	Juries	Public	Total	Place
1	Panetoz	"Håll om mig hårt"	14	39	53	8
2	Lisa Ajax	"My Heart Wants Me Dead"	23	33	56	7
3	David Lindgren	"We Are Your Tomorrow"	11	28	39	11
4	SaRaha	"Kizunguzungu"	11	36	47	9
5	Oscar Zia	"Human"	89	43	132	2
6	Ace Wilder	"Don't Worry"	83	35	118	3
7	Robin Bengtsson	"Constellation Prize"	40	43	83	5
8	Molly Sandén	"Youniverse"	39	37	76	6
9	Boris René	"Put Your Love on Me"	6	35	41	10
10	Frans	"If I Were Sorry"	88	68	156	1
11	Wiktoria	"Save Me"	69	45	114	4
12	Samir and Viktor	"Bada nakna"	0	31	31	12

=== Promotion ===
Prior to the 2016 contest, Frans performed "If I Were Sorry" during the London Eurovision Party on 17 April 2016, which was held at the Café de Paris venue in London, United Kingdom and hosted by Nicki French and Paddy O'Connell.

== At Eurovision ==
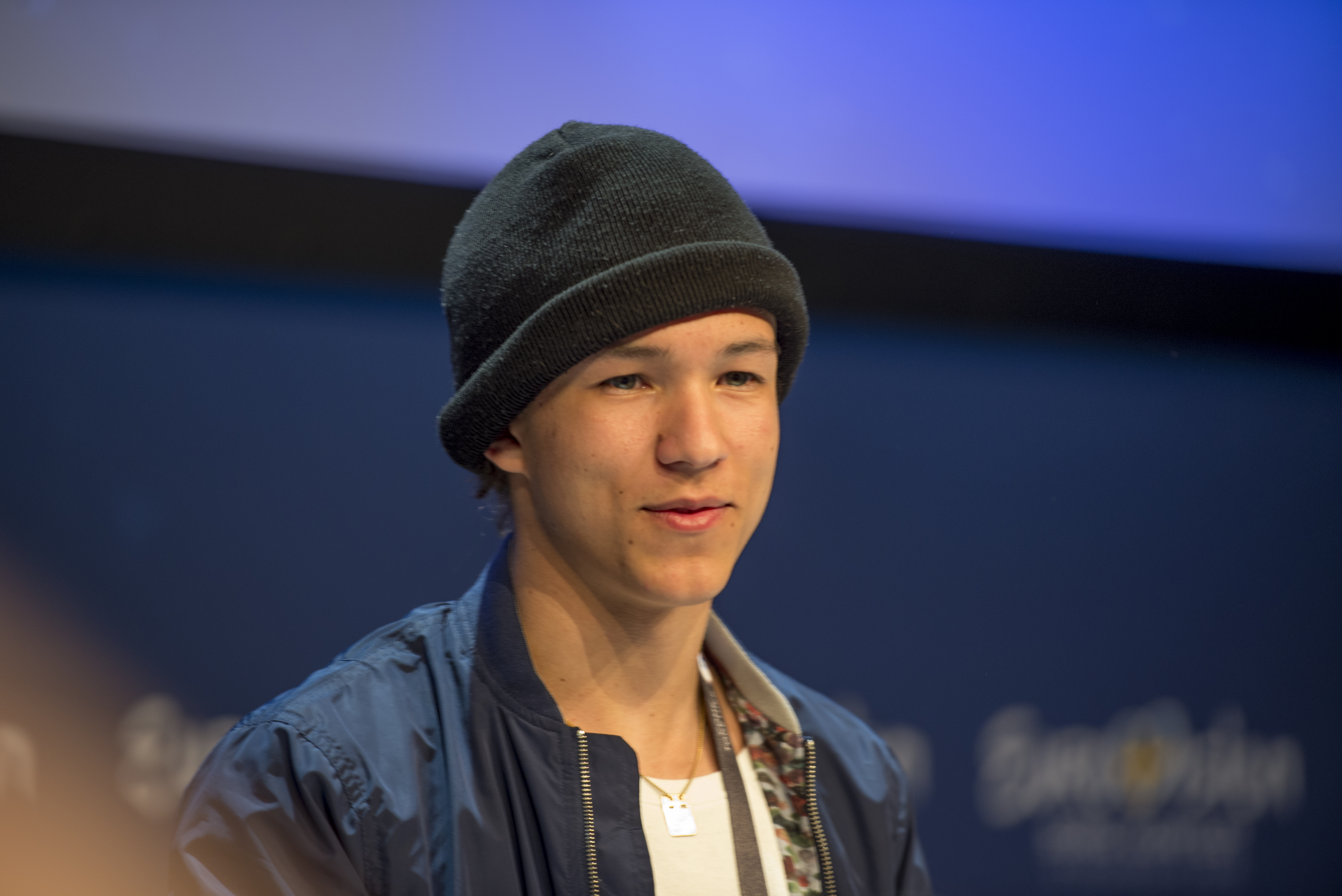
Frans during a press meet and greet

All countries except the "Big Five" (France, Germany, Italy, Spain and the United Kingdom) and the host country, are required to qualify from one of two semi-finals in order to compete for the final; the top ten countries from each semi-final progress to the final. As the host country, Sweden automatically qualified to compete in the final on 14 May 2016. In addition to their participation in the final, Sweden is also required to broadcast and vote in one of the two semi-finals. This would have been regularly decided via a draw held during the semi-final allocation draw on 25 January 2016, however, prior to the draw, SVT requested of the European Broadcasting Union that Sweden be allowed to broadcast and vote in the first semi-final on 10 May 2016, which was approved by the contest's Reference Group.

The two semi-finals and the final were televised in Sweden on SVT1 with commentary by Lotta Bromé. The three shows were also broadcast via radio on SR P4 with commentary by Carolina Norén and Björn Kjellman. SVT24 also broadcast the three shows interpreted in International Sign for the deaf and sign language users. SVT appointed Gina Dirawi as its spokesperson to announce the top 12-point score awarded by the Swedish jury during the final.

=== Final ===
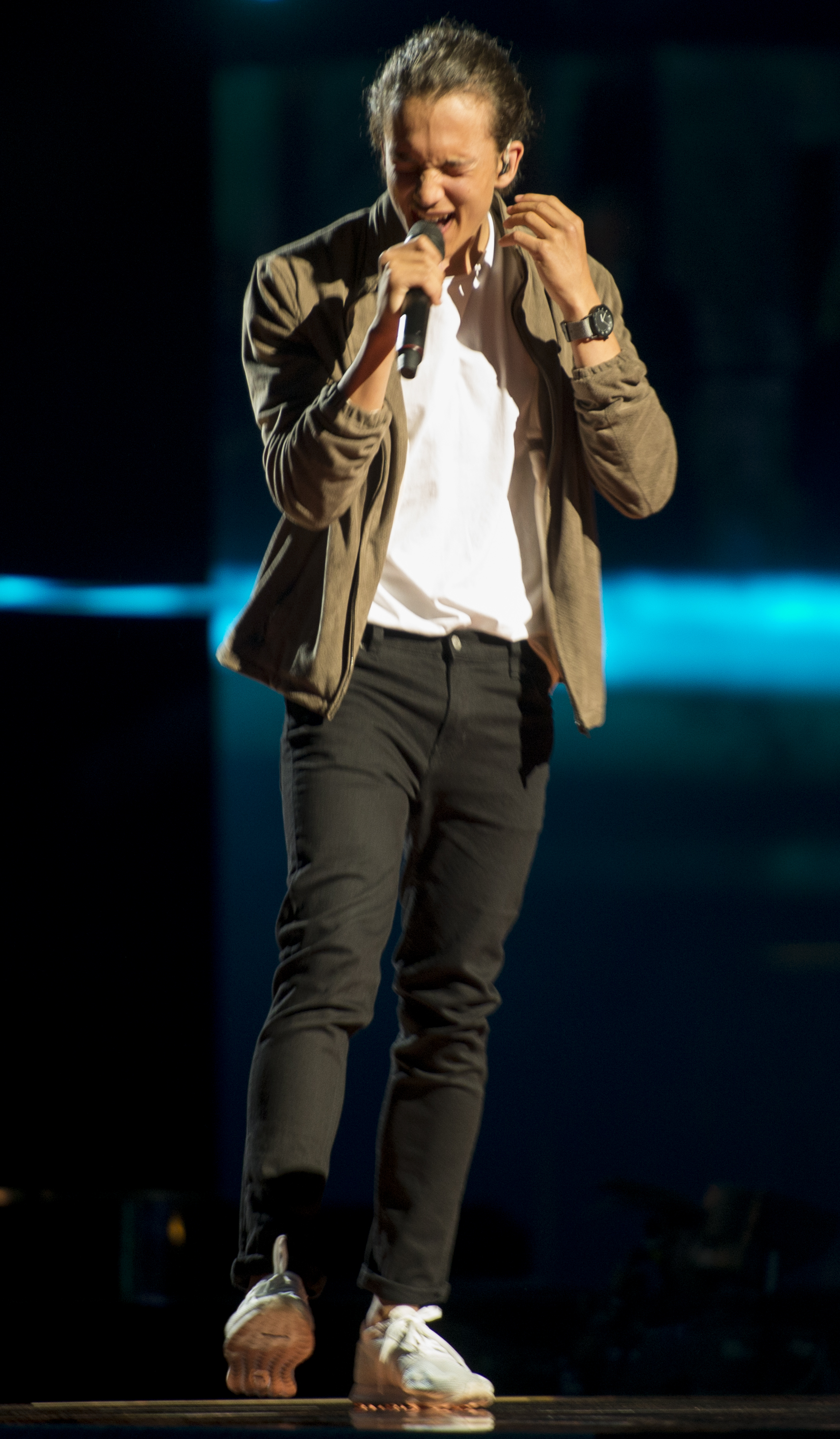
Frans during a rehearsal before the final

Frans took part in technical rehearsals on 3 and 8 May, followed by dress rehearsals on 9, 13 and 14 May. This included the semi-final jury show on 9 May where an extended clip of the Swedish performance was filmed for broadcast during the live show on 10 May and the jury final on 13 May where the professional juries of each country watched and voted on the competing entries. As the host nation, Sweden's running order position in the final was decided through a random draw that took place during the Heads of Delegation meeting in Stockholm on 14 March 2016. Sweden was drawn to perform in position 9. Following the second semi-final, the shows' producers decided upon the running order of the final rather than through another draw, so that similar songs were not placed next to each other. While Sweden had already been drawn to perform in position 9, it was determined that Sweden would perform following Bulgaria and before the entry from Germany.

The Swedish performance featured Frans alone on stage performing in front of a screen of lights, which displayed various patterns and spelled words from the song lyrics. During the performance, Frans moved from the main stage to the satellite stage where he finished the song. Frans was joined by one off-stage backing vocalist: Jonathan Jaarnek Norén. Sweden placed fifth in the final, scoring 261 points: 139 points from the televoting and 122 points from the juries.

=== Voting ===
Voting during the three shows was conducted under a new system that involved each country now awarding two sets of points from 1–8, 10 and 12: one from their professional jury and the other from televoting. Each nation's jury consisted of five music industry professionals who are citizens of the country they represent, with their names published before the contest to ensure transparency. This jury judged each entry based on: vocal capacity; the stage performance; the song's composition and originality; and the overall impression by the act. In addition, no member of a national jury was permitted to be related in any way to any of the competing acts in such a way that they cannot vote impartially and independently. The individual rankings of each jury member as well as the nation's televoting results were released shortly after the grand final.

Below is a breakdown of points awarded to Sweden and awarded by Sweden in the first semi-final and grand final of the contest, and the breakdown of the jury voting and televoting conducted during the two shows:

==== Points awarded to Sweden ====
Points awarded to Sweden (Final)
Score	Televote	Jury
12 points	Denmark; Iceland	Czech Republic; Estonia; Finland
10 points	Estonia; Finland; Poland	Germany; Netherlands
8 points	Germany	Austria; Belarus; Latvia
7 points	Austria; Croatia; Hungary; Latvia; Lithuania; Norway	
6 points		Georgia; Iceland; Moldova
5 points	Slovenia	France; Ireland
4 points	San Marino	Denmark; Hungary; Ukraine
3 points	Albania; Bulgaria	
2 points	Armenia; Belarus; Czech Republic; France; Ireland; Netherlands; Russia	Italy
1 points	Belgium; Cyprus; Serbia; Spain; Ukraine; United Kingdom	

==== Points awarded by Sweden ====
Points awarded by Sweden (Semi-final 1)
Score	Televote	Jury
12 points	Bosnia and Herzegovina	Russia
10 points	Netherlands	Malta
8 points	Russia	Azerbaijan
7 points	Austria	Czech Republic
6 points	Finland	Netherlands
5 points	Iceland	Armenia
4 points	Hungary	Finland
3 points	Armenia	Croatia
2 points	Cyprus	Austria
1 point	Croatia	Cyprus

Points awarded by Sweden (Final)
Score	Televote	Jury
12 points	Australia	Australia
10 points	Poland	Azerbaijan
8 points	Russia	France
7 points	Ukraine	Malta
6 points	Lithuania	Russia
5 points	Austria	Netherlands
4 points	Bulgaria	Armenia
3 points	France	Czech Republic
2 points	Netherlands	Lithuania
1 point	Spain	Spain

==== Detailed voting results ====
The following members comprised the Swedish jury:

- Karin Gunnarsson (jury chairperson) – radio DJ
- Lisa Ajax – artist
- Anton Ewald – artist
- Rickard Kellor – program director NRJ Sweden SBS Discovery Radio
- Anderz Wrethov – songwriter, artist, producer

Wiktoria Johansson was originally announced as one of the Swedish jurors. On 4 May, Johansson was replaced by Lisa Ajax due to her participation as a panelist in the SVT1 programme Inför Eurovision Song Contest, where she evaluated and distributed points to the competing entries prior to the contest.

Detailed voting results from Sweden (Semi-final 1)
R/O	Country	Jury							Televote	
R/O	Country	K. Gunnarsson	L. Ajax	A. Ewald	R. Kellor	A. Wrethov	Rank	Points	Rank	Points
01	Finland	10	9	1	7	9	7	4	5	6
02	Greece	15	15	18	9	18	16		15	
03	Moldova	18	14	9	15	12	14		17	
04	Hungary	6	10	17	11	11	13		7	4
05	Croatia	4	8	16	6	7	8	3	10	1
06	Netherlands	5	7	15	3	1	5	6	2	10
07	Armenia	1	3	6	13	10	6	5	8	3
08	San Marino	17	18	10	14	17	18		11	
09	Russia	2	2	3	2	2	1	12	3	8
10	Czech Republic	3	5	5	8	8	4	7	13	
11	Cyprus	14	13	7	12	5	10	1	9	2
12	Austria	9	17	14	4	6	9	2	4	7
13	Estonia	12	6	4	16	16	12		14	
14	Azerbaijan	11	1	8	1	3	3	8	16	
15	Montenegro	16	16	13	17	14	17		18	
16	Iceland	8	11	11	10	13	11		6	5
17	Bosnia and Herzegovina	13	12	12	18	15	15		1	12
18	Malta	7	4	2	5	4	2	10	12	

Detailed voting results from Sweden (Final)
R/O	Country	Jury							Televote	
R/O	Country	K. Gunnarsson	L. Ajax	A. Ewald	R. Kellor	A. Wrethov	Rank	Points	Rank	Points
01	Belgium	9	13	9	10	16	11		13	
02	Czech Republic	6	8	11	7	18	8	3	25	
03	Netherlands	5	10	12	6	3	6	5	9	2
04	Azerbaijan	12	1	4	2	6	2	10	24	
05	Hungary	18	14	17	18	19	18		17	
06	Italy	17	23	24	13	15	20		16	
07	Israel	21	16	10	19	5	15		15	
08	Bulgaria	19	7	14	17	4	13		7	4
09	Sweden									
10	Germany	20	25	23	16	20	23		21	
11	France	2	9	5	3	10	3	8	8	3
12	Poland	25	24	25	20	21	25		2	10
13	Australia	1	5	1	1	1	1	12	1	12
14	Cyprus	24	22	13	23	12	21		14	
15	Serbia	16	20	19	22	22	22		18	
16	Lithuania	13	18	7	12	2	9	2	5	6
17	Croatia	8	15	18	11	7	12		22	
18	Russia	7	6	8	4	8	5	6	3	8
19	Spain	15	2	2	14	23	10	1	10	1
20	Latvia	14	12	16	25	17	17		11	
21	Ukraine	3	19	20	21	13	16		4	7
22	Malta	4	4	3	8	14	4	7	23	
23	Georgia	23	17	22	24	24	24		20	
24	Austria	10	21	21	5	9	14		6	5
25	United Kingdom	22	11	15	15	25	19		19	
26	Armenia	11	3	6	9	11	7	4	12	
