= Melodifestivalen 2016 =

Swedish music competition

Dates and venues
- Heat 1: 6 February 2016; Scandinavium, Gothenburg
- Heat 2: 13 February 2016; Malmö Arena, Malmö
- Heat 3: 20 February 2016; Himmelstalundshallen, Norrköping
- Heat 4: 27 February 2016; Gavlerinken Arena, Gävle
- Second chance: 5 March 2016; Halmstad Arena, Halmstad
- Final: 12 March 2016; Friends Arena, Solna

Production
- Broadcaster: Sveriges Television (SVT)
- Director: Robin Hofwander; Fredrik Bäcklund
- Presenters: All shows: Gina Dirawi; Guest co-hosts: Petra Mede (heat 1); Henrik Schyffert (heat 3); Sarah Dawn Finer (heat 4); Ola Salo and Peter Jöback (Second Chance); William Spetz (final)

Participants
- Number of entries: 27: 6 in the first heat, 7 in the other heats; 12 in the final (2 from each heat, 4 from the Second Chance round)

Vote
- Winning song: "If I Were Sorry" by Frans

Melodifestivalen 2016 was the 56th edition of the Swedish music competition Melodifestivalen, which selected Sweden's entry for the Eurovision Song Contest 2016. The competition was organised by Sveriges Television (SVT) and took place over the six-week period between 6 February and 12 March 2016.

For the 15th consecutive year, the format of the competition consisted of six shows: four heat rounds, a second-chance round and a final. The 28 competing entries were divided into four heats, with seven compositions in each. From each heat, the songs that earned first and second place qualified directly to the final, while the songs that placed third and fourth proceeded to the Second Chance round. The bottom three songs in each heat were eliminated from the competition. An additional four entries qualified from the Second Chance round to the final, bringing the total number of competing entries in the final to 12. All six shows were hosted by Gina Dirawi, who was joined by guest co-hosts during each show: Petra Mede (heat 1), Henrik Schyffert (heat 3), Sarah Dawn Finer (heat 4), Peter Jöback and Ola Salo (Second Chance round) and William Spetz (final); Charlotte Perrelli was originally announced as the guest co-host for the second heat, however, her role was changed to guest performer due to a conflict of interest stemming from her endorsement deal with Swedish mobile brand Comviq.

An initial 28 entries were selected for the competition through three methods: an open call for song submissions, direct invitations to specific artists and songwriters and a wildcard given to one of the artists that participated in the Svensktoppen nästa competition organised by Sveriges Radio P4. Twenty-seven entries ultimately competed as one of the selected songs, "Himmel för två" to have been performed by Anna Book, was disqualified prior to the start of heats as it had competed in the 2014 Moldovan Eurovision Song Contest national selection, thus violating the rules of the competition.

"If I Were Sorry" performed by Frans was selected as the winner of the 2016 competition after scoring the highest number of points following the combination of votes from 11 international jury groups and a public vote consisting of telephone, SMS and app voting. The song represented Sweden in the Eurovision Song Contest 2016, which took place in the Stockholm Globe Arena in Stockholm on 10, 12 and 14 May 2016. "If I Were Sorry" competed directly in the final of the Eurovision Song Contest 2016 on 14 May due to Sweden being the host nation for the contest following the victory of Måns Zelmerlöw and the song "Heroes" in 2015. At the contest, Sweden placed fifth out of the 26 competing nations in the final, scoring 261 points.

== Format ==
Melodifestivalen 2016, organised by Sveriges Television (SVT), was the fifteenth consecutive edition of the contest in which the competition took place in different cities across Sweden. The four heats were held at the Scandinavium in Gothenburg (6 February), the Malmö Arena in Malmö (13 February), the Himmelstalundshallen in Norrköping (20 February) and the Gavlerinken Arena in Gävle (27 February). The Second Chance round took place at the Halmstad Arena in Halmstad on 5 March while the final was held at the Friends Arena in Solna on 12 March. An initial twenty-eight entries were intended to compete in the heats, with seven entries taking part in each show. The first heat only featured six entries after one of the competing songs was disqualified. The top two entries from each heat advanced directly to the final, while the third and fourth placed entries advanced to the Second Chance round. The bottom three entries in each heat were eliminated. An additional four entries qualified to the final from the Second Chance round, bringing the total number of competing entries in the final to twelve.

Christer Björkman was announced as the executive producer and Annette Helenius as project manager of the competition, replacing Maria Ilstedt and Christel Tholse Willers, respectively, from the previous year.

Competition Schedule
Show	Date	City	Venue	Hosts	
Heat 1	6 February	Gothenburg	Scandinavium	Gina Dirawi	Petra Mede
Heat 2	13 February	Malmö	Malmö Arena	Gina Dirawi	Charlotte Perrelli (Guest performer)
Heat 3	20 February	Norrköping	Himmelstalundshallen	Gina Dirawi	Henrik Schyffert
Heat 4	27 February	Gävle	Gavlerinken Arena	Gina Dirawi	Sarah Dawn Finer
Second Chance round	5 March	Halmstad	Halmstad Arena	Gina Dirawi	Peter Jöback and Ola Salo
Final	12 March	Solna	Friends Arena	Gina Dirawi	William Spetz

=== Entry selection ===
Entries for the 2016 competition were selected through three methods:

- 14 entries were chosen by a selection panel from submissions received by SVT through an open call for songs.
- 13 entries were selected by SVT via special invitations to artists and songwriters.
- 1 entry was provided by the selected artist from the competition Svensktoppen nästa organised by Sveriges Radio P4.

SVT opened two submission contests that accepted entries between 1 and 16 September 2015 for interested artists and songwriters to submit their proposals for the competition. The Regular contest was open for entries that had at least one songwriter that already had a musical work published, while the Public contest accepted entries from songwriters without previously published musical work. Entries submitted for the competition were required to be new compositions which had never been published between 2–3 minutes in length and with at least one songwriter that had Swedish citizenship. The choice of language was free, however, SVT reserved 30% of the contest's places for entries sung mainly in Swedish. SVT also aimed to have at least 50% of the contest's places for entries written by female composers and lyricists either in a solo or collaborative capacity.

Following the conclusion of the submission periods, SVT received 2,450 entries—an increase of 273 entries from the previous year. 1,982 of the entries were entered into the Regular contest, while 468 entries were entered into the Public contest. SVT created a shortlist of entries from the received submissions and formed a selection panel that was tasked to select fourteen entries for the competition. The selection panel consisted of seventeen members: ten men and seven women 18–64 years of age. Half of the jury members represented people working in or involved with the music industry (professional dancers, artist managers, music editors and programme/music directors) and the other half consisted of members of the public who are viewers of Melodifestivalen (with professions such as engineers, bloggers, teachers, consultants and students).

Members of the Selection Panel
Name	Profession
Anna Shimoda	Editor in chief for Hänt.se, Aller Media
Axel Scholtzé	Production assistant
Ben Robertson	Teacher and member of Melodifestivalen club
Carl-Philip Landin	Consultant
Cecilia Eriksson	Student musician
Edin Jusuframic	Dancer and choreographer
Ken Olausson	Engineer and blogger
Kerstin Behrendtz	Music editor for Sveriges Radio P4
Lisa Arnold	Dancer
Magnus Rogmark	Consultant
Mari Hesthammaer	Music editor for Sveriges Radio P3
Mari Ryberger	Melodifestivalen entry producer
Maria Ericson	Artist manager for Allsång på Skansen, assistant project manager for Melodifestivalen 2016
Martin Glemme	Marketing and PR
Rickard Keilor	Programme manager SBS Radio
Robert Sehlberg	Music director MTG Radio
Simon Grusell	Student

=== Presenters ===
At a press conference on 17 November 2015, Gina Dirawi was presented as the main host for all six shows of Melodifestivalen 2016. Her selection as the host made Dirawi the first woman to host Melodifestivalen three times, having previously presented the competition in 2012 and 2013. Dirawi was joined by guest co-hosts during each show: Petra Mede (heat 1), Henrik Schyffert (heat 3), Sarah Dawn Finer (heat 4), Peter Jöback (Second Chance round), Ola Salo (Second Chance round) and William Spetz (final). Originally, Charlotte Perrelli was announced as the guest co-host for the second heat, however, after a breach of contract arose regarding Perrelli's endorsement deal with mobile phone brand Comviq, her role in the programme was changed to guest performer. Mede, Schyffert, Finer and Perrelli had all hosted Melodifestivalen on previous occasions; Mede in 2009, Schyffert in 2005, Finer in 2012, and Perrelli in 2003 and 2004.

=== Voting ===
During the six shows, viewers could cast their votes through telephone, SMS and mobile application voting. For telephone and SMS voting, viewers were able to cast their vote through two different voting lines per voting method: a regular line costing 3.60 SEK and a donation line costing 9.90 SEK of which 8.90 SEK was donated to the charity organisation Radiohjälpen. Up to 20 votes could be cast per phone number per voting line, allowing a single phone number to contribute a maximum of 80 votes in each round of voting. With the mobile application, each device could send up to 5 votes for free per entry. The results of the heats and Second Chance round were determined solely by viewer votes, while in the final, the results were determined through a 50/50 combination of viewer votes and the votes of eleven international jury groups. 36,711,512 votes were cast in total during the six shows with 4,633,907 SEK collected for Radiohjälpen.

== Competing entries ==
The twenty-eight competing entries were announced to the public during a press conference on 30 November 2015. Prior to the press conference, it was only known that the group Smilo (formerly Smajling Swedes) had been selected for the competition from the artists that participated in the Svensktoppen nästa competition organised by Sveriges Radio P4.

Among the competing artists were former Melodifestivalen winners Tommy Nilsson (1989) and Martin Stenmarck (2005). Krista Siegfrids had also participated in the Eurovision Song Contest in 2013 where she represented Finland. Ace Wilder, After Dark, Anna Book, David Lindgren, Dolly Style, Isa, Linda Bengtzing, Mattias Andréasson, Molly Pettersson Hammar, Molly Sandén, Oscar Zia, Panetoz, Patrik Isaksson, Pernilla Andersson, Samir and Viktor, Swingfly and Uno Svenningsson have all participated in Melodifestivalen during previous editions. In addition to having participated in Melodifestivalen previously, Molly Sandén also represented Sweden in the Junior Eurovision Song Contest 2006.

On 4 February 2016, SVT held a press conference where they announced that "Himmel för två", written by Sven-Inge Sjöberg, Lennart Wastesson, Larry Forsberg and Camilla Läckberg and to have been performed by Anna Book, was disqualified from the competition. The disqualification came two days before the song was set to be performed in the first heat after it was discovered that the song had previously competed in the audition stage of the 2014 Moldovan Eurovision Song Contest national selection under the title "Taking Care of a Broken Heart" with lyrics in English.

Artist	Song (English translation)	Songwriter(s)
Ace Wilder	"Don't Worry"	Joy Deb, Linnea Deb, Anton Hård af Segerstad, Ace Wilder, Behshad Ashnai, Martina Avacado
After Dark	"Kom ut som en stjärna" (Come out like a star)	Sven-Inge Sjöberg, Lennart Wastesson, Larry Forsberg, Lina Eriksson, Kent Olsson, Calle Kindbom
Albin & Mattias	"Rik" (Rich)	Albin Johnsén, Mattias Andréasson
~~Anna Book~~	~~"Himmel för två" (Heaven for two)~~	~~Sven-Inge Sjöberg, Lennart Wastesson, Larry Forsberg, Camilla Läckberg~~
Boris René	"Put Your Love on Me"	Boris René, Tobias Lundgren, Tim Larsson
David Lindgren	"We Are Your Tomorrow"	Anderz Wrethov, Sharon Vaughn, Gustav Efraimsson
Dolly Style	"Rollercoaster"	Thomas G:son, Peter Boström, Alexandra Salomonsson
Eclipse	"Runaways"	Erik Mårtensson
Frans	"If I Were Sorry"	Oscar Fogelström, Michael Saxell, Fredrik Andersson, Frans Jeppsson Wall
Isa	"I Will Wait"	Anton Hård af Segerstad, Joy Deb, Linnea Deb, Nikki Flores
Krista Siegfrids	"Faller" (Falling)	Krista Siegfrids, Gabriel Alares, Magnus Wallin, Gustaf Svenungsson
Linda Bengtzing	"Killer Girl"	Mathias Kallenberger, Andréas Berlin, Linda Bengtzing, Dag Öhrlund
Lisa Ajax	"My Heart Wants Me Dead"	Linnea Deb, Joy Deb, Anton Hård af Segerstad, Nikki Flores, Sara Forsberg
Martin Stenmarck	"Du tar mig tillbaks" (You take me back)	David Stenmarck
Mimi Werner	"Ain't No Good"	Mimi Werner, Göran Werner, Marcus Svedin, Jason Saenz
Molly Pettersson Hammar	"Hunger"	Joy Deb, Linnea Deb, Lisa Desmond, Anton Hård af Segerstad, Molly Pettersson Hammar
Molly Sandén	"Youniverse"	Molly Sandén, Danny Saucedo, John Alexis
Oscar Zia	"Human"	Oscar Zia, Victor Thell, Maria Smith
Panetoz	"Håll om mig hårt" (Hold me tight)	Jimmy Jansson, Karl-Ola Kjellholm, Jakke Erixson, Pa Modou Badjie, Njol Badjie, Nebeyu Baheru
Patrik, Tommy & Uno	"Håll mitt hjärta hårt" (Hold my heart hard)	Patrik Isaksson, Tommy Nilsson, Uno Svenningsson
Pernilla Andersson	"Mitt guld" (My gold)	Pernilla Andersson, Fredrik Rönnqvist
Robin Bengtsson	"Constellation Prize"	Bobby Ljunggren, Henrik Wikström, Mark Hole, Martin Eriksson
Samir & Viktor	"Bada nakna" (Swim naked)	Fredrik Kempe, David Kreuger, Anderz Wrethov
SaRaha	"Kizunguzungu" (Dizziness)	Anderz Wrethov, Sara Larsson, Arash Labaf
Smilo	"Weight of the World"	Arvid Ångström, Dennis Babic, Oscar Berglund Juhola, Anton Göransson, Robin Danielsson
Swingfly feat. Helena Gutarra	"You Carved Your Name"	Joakim Åhlund, Andreas Kleerup
Victor och Natten	"100%"	Dag Lundberg, Melker, Jesper Lundh
Wiktoria	"Save Me"	Jens Siverstedt, Lauren Dyson, Jonas Wallin

== Heats ==
As in previous years, Melodifestivalen commenced with four heats, which determined the eight entries that advanced directly to the final and the eight entries that qualified to the Second Chance round. The running order for each heat was announced on 12 January 2016.

The heat results were based solely on viewer votes. Two rounds of voting took place in each heat to determine which entries would advance further and which entries would be eliminated. All seven competing entries in each heat (six in the first heat) participated in the first round of voting where the top five advanced to the second round, while the bottom two were eliminated. In the second round of voting, the two entries that occupied the first and second places qualified directly to the final, while the third and fourth placed entries proceeded to the Second Chance round. The fifth placed entry was eliminated. All votes from the second round of voting were added to the votes that each entry received from the first round of voting in order to determine the outcome.

=== Heat 1 ===
The first heat took place on 6 February 2016 at the Scandinavium in Gothenburg, hosted by Gina Dirawi and Petra Mede. "Don't Worry" performed by Ace Wilder and "Constellation Prize" performed by Robin Bengtsson qualified directly to the final, while "Bada nakna" performed by Samir and Viktor and "Rik" performed by Albin and Mattias advanced to the Second Chance round. A total of 4,389,687 votes were cast by the viewers during the show with a total of 477,689 SEK collected for Radiohjälpen.

In addition to the performances of the competing entries, Dirawi and Mede opened the show with a performance titled "Hela Sveriges fest" (All of Sweden's party) and performed together with Lasse Kronér as part of the interval act in a number titled "Allt är Eurovisions fel" (It's all Eurovision's fault). Spanish girl group and 2006 Spanish Eurovision entrants Las Ketchup also performed their song "The Ketchup Song (Aserejé)" as an interval act. Recurring interval acts such as Jonas Gardell's schlager school and dramatic readings of past Melodifestivalen song lyrics by Swedish actors were also part of the programme; Stina Ekblad performed a dramatic reading of Samir and Viktor's Melodifestivalen 2015 entry "Groupie".

Two days prior to the heat on 4 February, "Himmel för två", performed by Anna Book, was disqualified after it was discovered that the song had previously been entered and performed in the audition round of the 2014 Moldovan Eurovision Song Contest national selection. Book performed the song during the heat as an interval act.

R/O	Artist	Song	Votes			Place	Result
R/O	Artist	Song	Round 1	Round 2	Total	Place	Result
1	Samir & Viktor	"Bada nakna"	752,944	77,908	830,852	3	Second Chance
2	Pernilla Andersson	"Mitt guld"	258,740	—	258,740	6	Out
3	Mimi Werner	"Ain't No Good"	617,265	67,180	684,445	5	Out
4	Albin & Mattias	"Rik"	725,693	61,166	786,859	4	Second Chance
5	Anna Book	"Himmel för två"	—	—	—	—	Disqualified
6	Robin Bengtsson	"Constellation Prize"	836,672	112,863	949,535	1	Final
7	Ace Wilder	"Don't Worry"	772,879	99,797	872,676	2	Final

=== Heat 2 ===
The second heat took place on 13 February 2016 at the Malmö Arena in Malmö, hosted by Gina Dirawi. Charlotte Perrelli was originally supposed to co-host the show; however, after a breach of contract arose due to her endorsement deal with mobile phone brand Comviq, she appeared only as a guest performer instead. "We Are Your Tomorrow" performed by David Lindgren and "Save Me" performed by Wiktoria qualified directly to the final, while "Hunger" performed by Molly Pettersson Hammar and "I Will Wait" performed by Isa advanced to the Second Chance round. A total of 4,647,934 votes were cast by the viewers during the show with a total of 487,371 SEK collected for Radiohjälpen.

In addition to the performances of the competing entries, Dirawi and Perrelli opened the show with a performance titled "Flickorna från Sverige" (The girls from Sweden), while the interval act titled "Rädda schlagerdivan" (Save the schlager diva) included a video presentation that featured Claes Elfsberg and Arja Saijonmaa followed by Perrelli performing a Swedish language cover of the song "Atemlos durch die Nacht" by Helene Fischer entitled "Här står jag" (Here I stand). Recurring interval acts such as Jonas Gardell's schlager school and dramatic readings of past Melodifestivalen song lyrics by Swedish actors were also part of the program; Krister Henriksson and Peter Haber performed a dramatic reading of Kikki, Bettan and Lotta's Melodifestivalen 2002 entry "Vem é dé du vill ha".

R/O	Artist	Song	Votes			Place	Result
R/O	Artist	Song	Round 1	Round 2	Total	Place	Result
1	David Lindgren	"We Are Your Tomorrow"	807,520	64,752	872,272	2	Final
2	Victor och Natten	"100%"	427,891	—	427,891	6	Out
3	Molly Pettersson Hammar	"Hunger"	657,452	46,011	703,463	4	Second Chance
4	Isa	"I Will Wait"	786,203	63,939	849,596	3	Second Chance
5	Krista Siegfrids	"Faller"	452,301	36,341	486,642	5	Out
6	Patrik, Tommy & Uno	"Håll mitt hjärta hårt"	371,290	—	371,290	7	Out
7	Wiktoria	"Save Me"	832,355	91,648	924,003	1	Final

=== Heat 3 ===
The third heat took place on 20 February 2016 at the Himmelstalundshallen in Norrköping, hosted by Gina Dirawi and Henrik Schyffert. "Human" performed by Oscar Zia and "My Heart Wants Me Dead" performed by Lisa Ajax qualified directly to the final, while "Kizunguzungu" performed by SaRaha and "Put Your Love on Me" performed by Boris René advanced to the Second Chance round. A total of 4,389,051 votes were cast by the viewers during the show with a total of 425,474 SEK collected for Radiohjälpen.

In addition to the performances of the competing entries, Dirawi and Schyffert opened the show with a cover of "Under Pressure" originally by Queen and David Bowie, while the interval acts were stand-up comedy by Schyffert and a performance by Dirawi titled "Love Story". Recurring interval acts such as Jonas Gardell's schlager school and dramatic readings of past Melodifestivalen song lyrics by Swedish actors were also part of the program; Marie Göranzon performed a dramatic reading of Anna Book's Melodifestivalen 2007 entry "Samba Sambero".

R/O	Artist	Song	Votes			Place	Result
R/O	Artist	Song	Round 1	Round 2	Total	Place	Result
1	SaRaha	"Kizunguzungu"	506,273	66,361	572,634	4	Second Chance
2	Swingfly feat. Helena Gutarra	"You Carved Your Name"	411,040	—	411,040	6	Out
3	Smilo	"Weight of the World"	524,216	37,007	561,223	5	Out
4	After Dark	"Kom ut som en stjärna"	355,959	—	355,959	7	Out
5	Lisa Ajax	"My Heart Wants Me Dead"	880,118	68,760	948,878	1	Final
6	Boris René	"Put Your Love on Me"	598,521	57,891	656,412	3	Second Chance
7	Oscar Zia	"Human"	791,989	78,463	870,452	2	Final

=== Heat 4 ===
The fourth heat took place on 27 February 2016 at the Gavlerinken Arena in Gävle, hosted by Gina Dirawi and Sarah Dawn Finer. "Youniverse" performed by Molly Sandén and "If I Were Sorry" performed by Frans qualified directly to the final, while "Håll om mig hårt" performed by Panetoz and "Rollercoaster" performed by Dolly Style advanced to the Second Chance round. A total of 4,590,446 votes were cast by the viewers during the show with a total of 627,471 SEK collected for Radiohjälpen.

In addition to the performances of the competing entries, Dirawi and Finer opened the show with a cover of Guy Sebastian's 2015 Australian Eurovision entry "Tonight Again" titled "Du och jag igen" (You and I again), while the interval act featured a performance by Dirawi, Finer and Jon Henrik Fjällgren titled "Hela Sveriges sång" (All of Sweden's song). Helena Bergström, who hosted Melodifestivalen 2012 together with Dirawi and Finer, reprised her portrayals of Lasse and Marianne—characters that were part of the interval acts for the 2012 competition. Recurring interval acts such as Jonas Gardell's schlager school and dramatic readings of past Melodifestivalen song lyrics by Swedish actors were also part of the program; Lena Endre performed a dramatic reading of Linda Bengtzing's Melodifestivalen 2006 entry "Jag ljuger så bra".

R/O	Artist	Song	Votes			Place	Result
R/O	Artist	Song	Round 1	Round 2	Total	Place	Result
1	Eclipse	"Runaways"	462,162	54,294	516,456	5	Out
2	Dolly Style	"Rollercoaster"	563,559	33,537	597,096	4	Second Chance
3	Martin Stenmarck	"Du tar mig tillbaks"	345,313	—	345,313	6	Out
4	Linda Bengtzing	"Killer Girl"	330,615	—	330,615	7	Out
5	Frans	"If I Were Sorry"	870,725	147,443	1,018,168	1	Final
6	Panetoz	"Håll om mig hårt"	766,466	67,694	834,160	3	Second Chance
7	Molly Sandén	"Youniverse"	852,284	85,091	937,375	2	Final

== Second Chance round ==
The Second Chance round took place on 5 March 2016 at the Halmstad Arena in Halmstad, hosted by Gina Dirawi, Ola Salo and Peter Jöback. The eight entries that placed third and fourth in the preceding four heats competed during the show in four duels. SVT decided which entries would face off in each duel. Viewers determined the results during the show through telephone, SMS and application voting. Voting in each duel commenced at the start of the first entry's performance and concluded one minute and thirty seconds following the end of the second entry's performance. Executive producer Christer Björkman announced which four entries won their duels and advanced to the final in addition to revealing the running order of the final at the conclusion of the show. "Håll om mig hårt" performed by Panetoz, "Put Your Love on Me" performed by Boris René, "Kizunguzungu" performed by SaRaha and "Bada nakna" performed by Samir and Viktor qualified to the final. A total of 6,059,917 votes were cast by the viewers during the show with a total of 441,413 SEK collected for Radiohjälpen.

In addition to the performances of the competing entries, Dirawi, Salo and Jöback opened the show with a cover of Adele's "Skyfall", while the interval acts included a duet by Salo and Jöback titled "Sing Me Out" and Hasse Andersson performing his Melodifestivalen 2015 entry "Guld och gröna skogar". Recurring interval acts that were also part of the show included Jonas Gardell's schlager school and Helena Bergström's portrayals of the characters Lasse and Marianne.

Duel	R/O	Artist	Song	Votes	Result
I	1	Panetoz	"Håll om mig hårt"	965,823	Final
I	2	Molly Pettersson Hammar	"Hunger"	503,953	Out
II	1	Albin & Mattias	"Rik"	735,852	Out
II	2	Boris René	"Put Your Love on Me"	836,686	Final
III	1	Isa	"I Will Wait"	763,862	Out
III	2	SaRaha	"Kizunguzungu"	775,093	Final
IV	1	Dolly Style	"Rollercoaster"	571,216	Out
IV	2	Samir & Viktor	"Bada nakna"	907,432	Final

== Final ==
The final took place on 12 March 2016 at the Friends Arena in Solna, hosted by Gina Dirawi and William Spetz. Twelve entries competed during the show. Eight of the entries qualified directly from the heats, while four of the competing entries qualified from the Second Chance round. The winner was selected by a combination of viewer votes and eleven international jury groups. The viewers and the juries each had a total of 473 points to award. Each jury group distributed their points as follows: 1, 2, 4, 6, 8, 10 and 12 points. The viewer vote was based on the percentage of votes each song achieved through the following voting methods: telephone, SMS and mobile application. For example, if a song gained 10% of the viewer vote, then that entry would be awarded 10% of 473 points rounded to the nearest integer: 47 points. Viewers were able to cast their vote in the final from the start of the show until five minutes after the jury groups had distributed their points, allowing the viewers to respond to the outcome of the jury results. In the event of a tie, the viewer vote would overrule the jury. "If I Were Sorry" performed by Frans was selected as the winner after placing second with the international jury vote and winning the public vote to finish with an overall 156-point total. A record total of 12,643,477 votes were cast by the viewers during the show with a total of 2,174,489 SEK collected for Radiohjälpen.

In addition to the performances of the competing entries, the interval acts featured an anti-bullying themed performance of the Melodifestivalen 2015 winning song "Heroes", in a new arrangement by Moh Denebi, performed by Måns Zelmerlöw together with a children's choir and a medley of past Melodifestivalen hits intended to celebrate the fifteenth anniversary of the current format of the competition. The medley included: "Adrenaline" (2002) performed by DJ Méndez, "Don't Stop Believing" (2015) performed by Mariette, "Kom" (2010) performed by Timoteij, "Kom och ta mig" (2002) performed by Brandsta City Släckers, "Bröder" (2014) performed by Linus Svenning, "Moving On" (2009) performed by Sarah Dawn Finer, "Live Forever" (2007) performed by Magnus Carlsson, "Snälla snälla" (2009) performed by Caroline af Ugglas, "Sing For Me" (2006) performed by Andreas Johnson, "Håll om mig" (2005) performed by Nanne Grönvall, "Begging" (2013) performed by Anton Ewald, "Vem é dé du vill ha" (2002) performed by Kikki and Bettan, "Lay Your Love on Me" (2008) performed by BWO, "Hero" (2008) performed by Charlotte Perrelli and "La dolce vita" (2004) performed by After Dark. Recurring interval acts that were also part of the show included Jonas Gardell's schlager school, Helena Bergström's portrayals of the characters Lasse and Marianne and dramatic readings of past Melodifestivalen song lyrics by Swedish actors; Pernilla August and Michael Nyqvist performed a dramatic reading of Timoteij's Melodifestivalen 2010 entry "Kom". Sarah Dawn Finer also reprised her portrayal of the comedic character Lynda Woodruff, who first appeared in Melodifestivalen 2012.

R/O	Artist	Song	Juries	Televote/SMS/App			Total	Place
R/O	Artist	Song	Juries	Votes	Percentage	Points	Total	Place
1	Panetoz	"Håll om mig hårt"	14	1,033,326	8.2%	39	53	8
2	Lisa Ajax	"My Heart Wants Me Dead"	23	876,209	6.9%	33	56	7
3	David Lindgren	"We Are Your Tomorrow"	11	739,125	5.9%	28	39	11
4	SaRaha	"Kizunguzungu"	11	971,097	7.7%	36	47	9
5	Oscar Zia	"Human"	89	1,150,943	9.1%	43	132	2
6	Ace Wilder	"Don't Worry"	83	933,756	7.4%	35	118	3
7	Robin Bengtsson	"Constellation Prize"	40	1,142,783	9.0%	43	83	5
8	Molly Sandén	"Youniverse"	39	988,640	7.8%	37	76	6
9	Boris René	"Put Your Love on Me"	6	931,166	7.4%	35	41	10
10	Frans	"If I Were Sorry"	88	1,815,697	14.4%	68	156	1
11	Wiktoria	"Save Me"	69	1,206,130	9.5%	45	114	4
12	Samir & Viktor	"Bada nakna"	0	845,605	6.7%	31	31	12

Detailed International Jury Votes
R/O	Song	Bosnia and Herzegovina	Cyprus	Belarus	Netherlands	Estonia	Israel	Italy	Slovenia	France	Norway	Australia	Total
R/O	Song	Bosnia and Herzegovina	Cyprus	Belarus	Netherlands	Estonia	Israel	Italy	Slovenia	France	Norway	Australia	Total
1	"Håll om mig hårt"		6						2	4	2		14
2	"My Heart Wants Me Dead"			6		2		6	1	6		2	23
3	"We Are Your Tomorrow"	1		4			2		4				11
4	"Kizunguzungu"					4	6					1	11
5	"Human"	10	10	12	1	6	10	8	10	2	10	10	89
6	"Don't Worry"	8	2	8	12	8	4	12	12	1	4	12	83
7	"Constellation Prize"	4	8		8	1		4		10	1	4	40
8	"Youniverse"	6	4	2	2	10		1			8	6	39
9	"Put Your Love on Me"			1	4		1						6
10	"If I Were Sorry"	12	12		10	12	8	10	6	12	6		88
11	"Save Me"	2	1	10	6		12	2	8	8	12	8	69
12	"Bada nakna"												0
International Jury Spokespersons
Australia – Stephanie Werrett; Belarus – Olga Salamakha; Bosnia and Herzegovina – Dejan Kukrić; Cyprus – Klitos Klitou; Estonia – Mart Normet; France – Bruno Berberes; Israel – Tali Eshkoli; Italy – Nicola Caligiore; Netherlands – Daniël Dekker; Norway – Stig Karlsen; Slovenia – Maja Keuc

== Broadcast and ratings ==
All six shows in the competition were televised live on SVT1 and SVT World as well as streamed online via the broadcaster's streaming service SVT Play. The shows were also broadcast via radio on Sveriges Radio P4 with commentary by Carolina Norén and Ronnie Ritterland. The final was also broadcast on SVT24 with sign-language performers as well as via the mobile application SVT 360, which allowed users to view the final in a 360-degree format from the front row of the Friends Arena. International broadcasts of the final occurred on RÚV in Iceland, on NRK3 in Norway and on Yle Fem in Finland.

Show	Date	Viewers
Heat 1	6 February 2016	3,279,000
Heat 2	13 February 2016	3,167,000
Heat 3	20 February 2016	3,241,000
Heat 4	27 February 2016	3,079,000
Second Chance	5 March 2016	2,921,000
Final	12 March 2016	3,464,000
