= I Will Wait (Isa song) =

Single by Isa
- Released: 28 February 2016
- Genre: Pop
- Length: 2:56
- Label: Sony Music Entertainment Sweden
- Songwriter(s): Anton Hård af Segerstad; Joy Deb; Linnea Deb; Nikki Flores

Isa singles chronology
| "Let It Kill You" (2015) | "I Will Wait" (2016) | "I.S.A." (2017) |

Music video
- "I Will Wait" on YouTube

"I Will Wait" is a song by Swedish singer Isa. The song was released in Sweden as a digital download on 28 February 2016, and was written by Anton Hård af Segerstad, Joy and Linnea Deb, and Nikki Flores. It took part in Melodifestivalen 2016, and qualified to andra chansen from the second semi-final where it placed 3rd. In andra chansen, it was eliminated after losing to SaRaha's Kizunguzungu.

== Track listing ==
Digital download
| No. | Title | Length |
|---|---|---|
| 1. | "I Will Wait" | 2:56 |

== Chart performance ==
=== Weekly charts ===
| Chart (2016) | Peak position |
|---|---|
| Sweden (Sverigetopplistan) | 35 |

== Release history ==
| Region | Date | Format | Label |
|---|---|---|---|
| Sweden | 28 February 2016 | Digital download | Sony Music Entertainment Sweden |
