= Gustav Efraimsson =

Swedish songwriter and music producer

Gustav Efraimsson (born 1980) is a Swedish songwriter and music producer.

== Early life ==
Efraimsson grew up on the Swedish west coast, in a town called Gothenburg. He later moved to Stockholm, the capital of Sweden and a major source of worldwide hits from songwriters like Max Martin, Shellback, RedOne and Anders Bagge.

== Musical career ==
He has written songs for major recording artists like NKOTBSB (New Kids On The Block & Backstreet Boys), Snoop Dogg, 'Anouk, September, Marta Sánchez, Jennifer Rush, Sweetbox, Audio Playground, Edurne, Sweet California, Eric Saade as well as many others. In 2016 his song "We Are Your Tomorrow" was chosen to be in the Melodifestivalen 2016 (the Swedish qualifier for Eurovision Song Contest 2016) and made it all the way to final, held at Friends Arena on March 12.

== Selected discography ==
Alexie Divello

- Got This Feeling feat. Saco Bear

Alisa

- Rock Ur Body

Anouk

- Be My Baby
- Keeps Getting Better

Anniela

- Crescendo
- Sin Of My Own

Aitor Saez

- A Pleno Sol

Audio Playground

- Emergency (feat. Snoop Dogg) (#13 US Billboard Dance/Club)
- Hands Up In The Air (#1 US Billboard Dance/Club)

Axel Schylström

- Tagen På Sängen

Beatrice

- Electroshock

Beatrix Kiddo

- Swipe

Camp Sweden

- Kämpa Gul och Blå (feat. Ola Lustig)

Carina Dahl

- It Gets Better

David Lindgren

- We Are Your Tomorrow (Melodifestivalen 2016 finalist)

Deep

- People In The Plan

Super Junior Donghae & Eunhyuk

- Android Syndrome (#1 Oricon Album Chart Japan / #1 Oricon DVD Chart Japan)

Edurne

- Despierta (#3 Spain album chart, #5 Spain singles chart)
- No Mirar Atras (producer/mixer)
- Te Falta Veneno (producer/mixer)

Eric Saade

- Say It (#2 Sweden Album Chart)

Eric Suen

- Party Life (feat. Mike Kasem)

Fanclub

- Henrik Larsson

Fatin

- Saat Ku Gelap Saat Ku Remang (#1 Indonesian Album Chart, 10× platinum)

GAC (Gamaliel Audrey Cantika)

- Goooo
- I Want You
- Kamu

Gille

- Winter Dream

Gita Gutawa

- It's Not Me, It's You
- Karenamu Bukan Aku
- Sunshine After Rain

Gloss

- Sempre Em Movimento

Han Geng

- The One
- Wild Cursive (MTV EMA Winner x2, Grammy winner - Song Of The Year, China)

Inéz

- Listen To Your Heart

Jakob Karlberg

- Sluta Inte Dansa

Jennifer Rush

- Head Above Water

JLC

- Borta Bra Men Hemma Fest

John Park

- Imagine (#1 Korean Album Chart)

Josef Sedraia

- 6
- Bababababa

Josefin Glenmark

- She's In My Head

Jubilee Marisa

- Good Guys

Judika

- Sampai Kau Jadi Milikku (6× platinum album)
- Strong Together (6× platinum album)

Lia Larsson

- Fara Ner På Byn
- Fredag Lördag
- Sol, Vind och Snaps

Linus Kajman

- Krossat Glas
- Hört Det Förut

Lisa Ajax

- Jag Vill Ha Dig

Maja Kristina

- Imma Show U
- No Fake Love

Malena Laszlo

- Gold Silver Diamonds and Pearls

Malou Prytz

- Merry Christmas and a Happy New Year

Markoolio

- Låtsas Att Det Är Semester
- Norge (ett ruttet land)

Marta Sánchez

- Get Together (feat. D-MOL) (Official Bacardi International Campaign Song)

Matilda Thompson

- Ain't Waiting
- Elysium
- Run Back To The Fire
- What We Do

Misha Miller

- Deja Vu

Moncho

- Karantän
- Skaka Ditt Paket

Moncho & Tarequito

- Djuret I Mig

Monsta X

- Secret

Nathalie Saba

- Young Hearts

Naylon

- Get Over It

NKOTBSB (New Kids On The Block & Backstreet Boys)

- All In My Head (#7 US Billboard 200)

Ofelia

- Criminal (from Jordskott TV series)

Ola Lustig

- M.I.L.F.
- Julraketen
- Låtsas Att Det Är Semester
- Netflix och Chill

Rio Febrian

- Matahari
- Rasa Sesungguhnya
- Run Away

Risa Hirako

- Epic
- Take Me

Sebastian Walldén

- Bad News

Sean and Conor Price

- I Hate This

Seean

- It's Alright

September

- Sin Of My Own

Shawn Lee

- Around The World

Sweet California

- Good Lovin' (#1 Spain Singles Chart, #1 Spain Album Chart, Platinum certified)

Sweetbox

- Magic

Tereza Kerndlova

- Monsters

The Fooo Conspiracy

- What The Fooo

Tooji

- CockTail

Victoria Tocca

- All I Am
- In Your Hand
- I Din Hand

Wiktoria

- I Won't Stand In Your Way (producer/mixer)

What's Up

- Out Of The Blue
- Stone Cold Sober
- Romeo (producer/mixer)

Yamashita Tomohisa

- Blood Diamond (#1 Japan Album Chart)

Younha

- Joahae

Young Pharoz

- Flying The Flag / Yalla Ben Ne3eesh (song for the World Cup 2014)

He has produced and/or mixed songs for many well known European and Asian artists, including September, Marta Sánchez, Edurne, Yamashita Tomohisa and more.
