= Anton Hård af Segerstad =

Swedish songwriter

Anton Hård af Segerstad (earlier Anton Malmberg Hård af Segerstad) (born 28 December 1985) is a Swedish songwriter and producer, part of the production team "The Family" with Joy Deb and Linnea Deb.

His catalogue includes multiple award-winning songs and productions with artists like Iggy Azalea, Fifth Harmony, JoJo, MiC LOWRY, Dada Life, Nause, Loreen and Kim Cesarion.

Hård af Segerstad has also co-written several Melodifestivalen entries, the best known being "Heroes", performed by Måns Zelmerlöw, which won Melodifestivalen 2015 and the Eurovision Song Contest 2015.

== Discography ==
As songwriter and producer

Year	Artist	Title	Notes
2012	Dada Life	"Boing Clash Boom"	
2012	Dada Life	"Feed the Dada"	
2012	Molly Sandén	"Unchained"	
2012	Mimi Oh	"Det Går För Långsamt"	
2012	Mimi Oh	"Festen Som vi Hatar Imorrn"	
2012	Sergey Lazarev	"7 Wonders"	
2012	David Lindgren	"On The Dancefloor"	
2013	After School	"Dressing Room"	
2013	Kristīne Šomase	"Phoenix Fly"	
2013	Daniele Negroni	"Perfect Misfit"	
2013	Janet Leon	"Heartstrings"	
2013	Anton Ewald	"Begging"	It reached no.2 on the ‘Swedish Singles Chart’. 3× Platinum in Sweden.
2014	Didrick	"A Part of You"	
2014	Mystery Skulls	"Body High"	
2014	Manda	"Criminals"	
2014	Oscar Zia	"Ballare Con Me"	
2014	Samir & Viktor	"Success"	
2014	Outtrigger	"Echo"	
2014	Isac Elliot	"Engine"	
2014	Fabrizio Levita	"Kept Me Under"	
2015	Julia Parshuta	"Most Wanted"	
2015	Fifth Harmony	"Top Down"	
2015	Noize Generation	"A Song for You (feat. Patrik Jean)"	
2015	Nause	"The World I Know"	Certified Platinum in Sweden
2015	Molly Sandén	"Phoenix"	
2015	Linus Svenning	"Forever Starts Today"	
2015	Samir & Viktor	"Groupie"	
2015	Samir & Viktor	"Saxofuckingfon"	
2015	Andreas Weise	"Bring Out the Fire"	
2015	Måns Zelmerlöw	"Heroes"	Winner of ESC 2015 5× Platinum in Sweden. Gold in Spain, Norway and Austria.
2015	Måns Zelmerlöw	"Someday"	
2015	Måns Zelmerlöw	"Unbreakable"	
2015	JoJo	"Save My Soul"	JoJo's comeback single. The track reached No.3 on ‘the real-time Billboard + Twitter Trending 140’ chart' and peaked position 33 on Billboards ‘Pop Digital Songs’ chart.
2016	SAARA	"California"	
2016	Kim Jae-joong	"Love You To Death"	
2016	Namie Amuro	"Show Me What You've Got"	
2016	Måns Zelmerlöw	"Happyland"	
2016	Kim Cesarion	"Therapy"	
2016	Ace Wilder	"Don't Worry"	The song is featured in the trailer for ‘Bridget Jones’s baby’. Peaked position 13 on the ‘Swedish Single’ chart. Certified Platinum in Sweden.
2016	Molly Pettersson Hammar	"Hunger"	
2016	Isa	"I Will Wait"	It peaked position no. 35 on ‘the Swedish Single’ chart. Sold Gold in Sweden.
2016	Lisa Ajax	"My Heart Wants Me Dead"	It peaked position no.10 on ‘the Swedish Single’ chart.
2016	SAARA	"I Do"	
2016	Luna	"Free Somebody" & "Keep on Doin"	Both songs are part of her debut EP ‘Free somebody’ which peaked position 3 on US Billboards ‘World Album’ weekly chart and position 5 on ‘South Korea Gaon Album Chart’.
2016	AOA	"10 Seconds"	
2016	JoJo	"I Am" & "Fucking Genius"	
	MiC LOWRY	"Oh Lord"	
2017	Lisa Ajax	"I Don’t Give A"	
2017	Loreen	"Statements"	
2017	Iggy Azalea featuring Anitta	"Switch"	
2017	Matt Terry	"Sucker for You"	
2018	Alexander Oscar	"Number"	
2019	Olivia O'Brien	"purpleworld", "I Don't Exist", "Inhibition (omw)", "Just Friends", "UDK", "Care Less More", "Just a Boy" & "Love Myself"	
2019	SVEA	"I Love You but I Love Me More", "Good at Losing" & "In This Place"	
2019	Lisa Ajax	"I Like"	
2019	Hanna Ferm & LIAMOO	"Hold You"	
2019	LIAMOO	"Issues"	
2019	Marcus & Martinus	"Fix You"	
2019	Elina	"Champion"	
2019	Daniel Joy	"Too into Me"	
2019	Nova Miller	"Do It to Myself"	
2019	Ea Kaya	"Cruel to Be Kind"	
2020	Oriflame & SVEA	"Share Your Passion"	
2020	Olivia O'Brien	"Was It All in My Head?"	
2020	Silas Bjerregaard	"Kommer Tilbage"	
2020	Merk & Kremont, SVEA & Ernia	"Numb"	
2020	Zikai	"SOS"	
2020	Loreen	"Fiction Feels Good"	
2020	Alexander Oscar	"Bad Intentions"	
2020	SVEA	"All My Exes"	
2020	M.I.L.K.	"Summertime"	
2020	Summers	"No Pressure"	
2020	Zikai	"Twenty Something"	
2020	Max George	"Give Yourself to Me"	
2020	SVEA	"Too Much"	
2020	Icona Pop	"Feels in My Body"	
2020	Zookeepers & LittGloss	"Wherever You Want"	
2020	Velvet & House of Dreams	"Saturday or Sunday Night"	
2020	SVEA & Zikai	"Don't Stop the Music"	
2020	Elva Hsiao	"Lonely 911"	
2021	Mizki	"Love Myself"	
2021	The Cube Guys	"Gravity"	
2021	Molly Hammar	"FRIENDS"	
2021	Zikai	"You Can Call Me Al"	
2021	Lahos & SVEA	"Bad Thing"	
2021	Showtek & Theresa Rex	"What Is Love"	
2021	GiGi Grombacher	"The Marilyn"	
2021	Stefan van Nierop	"Jij Bent De Liefde"	
2021	Chen Linong	"Love Me More"	
2022	Clara Mae & Maximillian	"Miss the Party"	
2022	Clara Mae	"Little Hope" & "Learning Experience"	
2022	Jalle	"Hideaway"	
2022	Marcus & Martinus	"When All the Lights Go Out"	
2022	JC Stewart	"Scars"	
2022	Ilkay Sencan & INNA	"Talk"	
2022	Tim Schou	"Little Bit of Good"	
2022	Boy Destroy	"Self Immolation"	
2022	Tim Schou	"Liar"	
2022	MEDUN & Marcus & Martinus	"Gimme Your Love"	
2022	SVEA	"Iconic"	
2022	Molly Hammar	"På riktigt", "Can't Stay Away"	
2022	Boy Destroy	"Left Handed"	
2022	Johnossi	"Heroes"	
2023	Clara Mae	"When You're Young"	
2023	SVEA	"Effort"	
2023	LOVA	"Ego"	
2023	Julie Bergan	"Waste a Tear"	
2023	Clara Mae	"Thank God These Walls Can't Talk"	
2023	SVEA	"The Ick"	
2023	Boy Destroy	"Babyface"	
2023	Belleo	"Tequila Sunrise", "Strawberries", "Jacqueline"	
2023	SVEA	"Dead Man Walking"	
2023	ToDieFor	"in my room"	
2023	Ella Tiritiello	"Younger"	
2023	SVEA	"Feels Like Christmas"	
2023	xooos	"Crush!"	
2023	Belleo	"Auras and Water", "Street Life"	
2023	Nadja Kasanesh	"Oh Holy Night"	
2024	Klara Hammarström	"One of Us"	
2024	Marcus & Martinus & bbno$	"We Are Not the Same"	
2024	SOOJIN	"Lime"	
2024	SVEA & Cloudy June	"Breakfast Club"	
2024	Marcus & Martinus	"Talk", "Die for You"	
2024	SVEA	"The One That Got Away", "Blackout"	
2024	Ella Tiritiello	"It Must Have Been Love"	
2024	Ray Dalton	"Butterflies", "Champagne King", "Don't Wanna Be Lonely", "A Minute Too Late", "Off&On"	
2024	Nova & Alice, Hedda Stiernstedt & Josefin Asplund	"Sjunger om dig", "Nattens ljus", "For You", "Håll mig hårt men låt mig gå", "Lucky Blue", "Borde fattat", "Sweet Tooth"	
2025	Allwars Angels	"SF e bäst"	
2025	Joe L & El Migu	"Boo"	
2025	Marcus & Martinus	"The Room"	
2026	Leo del Mar	"Café Sol"	
2026	Ella Tiritiello & Von Disco	"Bara du är där"	
2026	W. Wallace	"Healing by Water", "Peaceful Rivers", "Breathing Underwater", "Flow with the Ocean"	
2026	Ella Tiritiello & noll2	"Förlorad"	
2026	Ella Tiritiello	"Ingen annan kommer såra mig nu", "Bara idioter", "Dåre", "Stannar eller går", "Jag ska bli bättre"	
2026	Alexander Oscar	"Svag"	
2026	Jazztroopers	"Peter Pan"	
