= Schmackeboom =

Single by Le Tac

from the album Schmackeboom
- Released: Sweden, July 2, 2014
- Recorded: 2014
- Genre: French pop, Euro-House, Comedy pop
- Length: 3:01
- Label: Warner Music Sweden
- Songwriter(s): Anderz Wrethov, Tacfarinas Yamoun (Le Tac)
- Producer(s): Anderz Wrethov

"Schmackeboom" is a song by Swedish singer of French origin - Tacfarinas Yamoun (aka "Le Tac"). The single was released on 20 May 2014 under the label Warner Music Sweden. The author of the song is a Swedish producer Anderz Wrethov, who had written the song with Le Tac.

The song was recorded officially in seven versions. A major part of each version is sung in poor French, and the phrase before the chorus is pronounced in English, Swedish, German, Italian or Spanish (for specific version). There was also published a separate single of remixes.

The name of the song (presumably) comes from the Swedish "schmacka" (English: to naughty).

In 2014, the song was played on radio stations in Ukraine, Russia, Sweden, Poland, Germany and France.

== Music video ==
In August, 2014 on the singer's YouTube channel, the music video was uploaded. Le Tac is shown kneading the dough and clapping the buttocks of half-naked girls appearing in the kitchen with the dough, or "baguettes" in their hands. After that, he starts dancing among them together with the chef. In one of the episodes on some woman's body there appears the flag of Sweden.

This video was forbidden on YouTube for minors and unregistered users.

== Track-list ==
=== Official version ===
1. Schmackeboom (Do You Want To F**k With Me) — European version
2. Schmackeboom (Voulez-vous crac-crac avec moi) — French
3. Schmackeboom (Wollen Sie Bumsen Mit Mich) — German
4. Schmackeboom (Vuoi Scopare Con Me) — Italian
5. Schmackeboom (Quieres Follar Conmigo) — Spanish
6. Schmackeboom (Vill du knulla med mig) — Swedish
7. Schmackeboom (Do You Want To Cook With Me) — English

=== Remix-versions ===
1. Schmackeboom (Do You Want To Fuck With Me) (English Radio Edit)
2. Schmackeboom (Do You Want To Fuck With Me) (Around The Globe Remix)
3. Schmackeboom (Do You Want To Fuck With Me) (Peet Syntax & Alexie Divello Remix)
4. Schmackeboom (Do You Want To Fuck With Me) (Esquille's Small Room Club Remix)
5. Schmackeboom (Voulez Vous Crac Crac Avec Moi) (French Radio Edit)
6. Schmackeboom (Voulez Vous Crac Crac Avec Moi) (Around The Globe Remix)
7. Schmackeboom (Voulez Vous Crac Crac Avec Moi) (Peet Syntax & Alexie Divello Remix)
8. Schmackeboom (Wollen Sie Bumsen Mit Mich) (German Radio Edit)
9. Schmackeboom (Wollen Sie Bumsen Mit Mich) (Around The Globe Remix)
10. Schmackeboom (Wollen Sie Bumsen Mit Mich) (Peet Syntax & Alexie Divello Remix)
11. Schmackeboom (Wollen Sie Bumsen Mit Mich) (Esquille's Small Room Club Remix)
