= My Heart Wants Me Dead =

Single by Lisa Ajax
- Released: 28 February 2016
- Genre: Pop
- Length: 3:02
- Label: Capitol Music Group
- Songwriter(s): Anton Hård af Segerstad; Linnea Deb; Joy Deb; Nikki Flores; Sara Forsberg

Lisa Ajax singles chronology
"Blue-Eyed Girl" (2015)	"My Heart Wants Me Dead" (2016)	"Give Me That" (2016)

"My Heart Wants Me Dead" is a song by Swedish singer Lisa Ajax. The song was released in Sweden as a digital download on 28 February 2016, and was written by Anton Hård af Segerstad, Linnea Deb, Joy Deb, Nikki Flores, and Sara Forsberg. It took part in Melodifestivalen 2016, and qualified to the final from the third semi-final. It placed seventh in the final.

== Track listing ==
Digital download
No.	Title	Length
1.	"My Heart Wants Me Dead"	3:02

== Chart performance ==
Chart (2016)	Peak position
Sweden (Sverigetopplistan)	10

== Release history ==
Region	Date	Format	Label
Sweden	28 February 2016	Digital download	Capitol Music Group
