= Hunger (Molly Hammar song) =

Single by Molly Pettersson Hammar
- Released: 13 February 2016
- Genre: Soul; deep house; synthpop
- Length: 3:03
- Label: Warner Music Sweden
- Songwriter(s): Anton Hård af Segerstad; Joy Deb; Linnea Deb; Lisa Desmond; Molly Pettersson Hammar

Molly Pettersson Hammar singles chronology
| "Something Right" (2015) | "Hunger" (2016) |

"Hunger" is a song by Swedish singer Molly Pettersson Hammar. The song was released in Sweden as a digital download on 13 February 2016, and was written by Hammar along with Anton Hård af Segerstad, Joy and Linnea Deb, and Lisa Desmond. It took part in Melodifestivalen 2016, and qualified to andra chansen from the second semi-final. In andra chansen, it was eliminated.

== Track listing ==
Digital download
| No. | Title | Length |
|---|---|---|
| 1. | "Hunger" | 3:03 |

== Charts ==
=== Weekly charts ===
| Chart (2016) | Peak position |
|---|---|
| Sweden (Sverigetopplistan) | 57 |

== Release history ==
| Region | Date | Format | Label |
|---|---|---|---|
| Sweden | 13 February 2016 | Digital download | Warner Music Sweden |
