= Don't Worry (Ace Wilder song) =

2016 song by Ace Wilder

Single by Ace Wilder
- Released: 28 February 2016
- Genre: Dance-pop; soul
- Length: 2:59
- Label: Stereoscope Music Scandinavia
- Songwriters: Joy Deb; Linnea Deb; Anton Hård af Segerstad; Ace Wilder; Behshad Ashnai

Ace Wilder singles chronology
"Stupid" (2015)	"Don't Worry" (2016)	"Selfish" (2016)

"Don't Worry" is a song by Swedish singer Ace Wilder. The song was released in Sweden as a digital download on 28 February 2016, and was written by Wilder along with Joy Deb, Linnea Deb, Anton Hård af Segerstad, and Behshad Ashnai. It took part in Melodifestivalen 2016, and qualified to the final from the first semi-final. It placed third in the final.

== Track listing ==
Digital download
No.	Title	Length
1.	"Don't Worry"	2:59

== Chart performance ==
Chart (2016)	Peak position
Sweden (Sverigetopplistan)	13

== Release history ==
Region	Date	Format	Label
Sweden	28 February 2016	Digital download	Stereoscope Music Scandinavia
