= Human (Oscar Zia song) =

Single by Oscar Zia
- Released: 28 February 2016
- Genre: Alternative pop
- Length: 3:04
- Label: Parlophone Music Sweden AB
- Songwriters: Oscar Zia; Victor Thell; Maria Smith

Oscar Zia singles chronology
"Ballare Con Me" (2014)	"Human" (2016)	"I Want You" (2019)

"Human" is a song by Swedish singer Oscar Zia. It was released on 28 February 2016 as a digital download in Sweden. The song was written and composed by Oscar Zia along with Victor Thell and Maria Smith. It placed second in the final of Melodifestivalen 2016. The song was subsequently certified Platinum in Sweden.

== Melodifestivalen ==
Being Zia's third participation in the Swedish Eurovision selection, "Human" participated in the third semi-final of the 2016 Melodifestivalen which was held in Norrköping's Himmelstalundshallen on 20 February 2016. The song was performed last at the semi-final. It direct qualified to the final as it got one of the first two places. On 12 March, during the final at the Friends Arena in Stockholm, Zia performed the song at the fifth position of the running order and got the highest score from the 11 international juries. Overall "Human" placed second in the competition with 132 points.

== Track listing ==
Digital download
No.	Title	Length
1.	"Human"	3:04

== Charts ==
Chart (2016)	Peak position
Sweden (Sverigetopplistan)	7

== Certifications ==
Certifications for "Human"
Region	Certification	Certified units/sales
Sweden (GLF)	Platinum	40,000^{‡}
^{‡} Sales+streaming figures based on certification alone.

== Release history ==
Country	Date	Format	Label
Sweden	28 February 2016	Digital download	Parlophone Music Sweden AB
