= We Are Your Tomorrow =

Single by David Lindgren
- Released: 28 February 2016
- Genre: Electropop
- Length: 2:58
- Label: Warner Music Sweden
- Songwriter(s): Anderz Wrethov; Sharon Vaughn; Gustav Efraimsson

David Lindgren singles chronology
"Skyline" (2013)	"We Are Your Tomorrow" (2016)

"We Are Your Tomorrow" is a song by Swedish singer David Lindgren. The song was released in Sweden as a digital download on 28 February 2016, and was written by Anderz Wrethov, Sharon Vaughn, and Gustav Efraimsson. It took part in Melodifestivalen 2016, and qualified to the final from the second semi-final. It placed 11th in the final.

== Track listing ==
Digital download
No.	Title	Length
1.	"We Are Your Tomorrow"	3:00

== Chart performance ==
=== Weekly charts ===
Chart (2016)	Peak position
Sweden (Sverigetopplistan)	27

== Release history ==
Region	Date	Format	Label
Sweden	28 February 2016	Digital download	Warner Music Sweden
