= You Carved Your Name =

Single by Swingfly featuring Helena Gutarra
- Released: 20 February 2016
- Genre: Electropop
- Length: 2:58
- Label: Warner Music Sweden
- Songwriter(s): Joakim Åhlund; Andreas Kleerup

Swingfly singles chronology
"God Damn Beautiful" (2013)	"You Carved Your Name" (2016)

Helena Gutarra singles chronology
"Dicksuckin'" (2013)	"You Carved Your Name" (2016)

"You Carved Your Name" is a song by American-Swedish rapper Swingfly featuring vocals by Swedish singer Helena Gutarra. The song was released in Sweden as a digital download on 20 February 2016, and was written by Joakim Åhlund and Andreas Kleerup. It took part in Melodifestivalen 2016, and placed sixth in the third semi-final.

== Track listing ==
Digital download
No.	Title	Length
1.	"You Carved Your Name"	2:58

== Chart performance ==
=== Weekly charts ===
Chart (2016)	Peak position
Sweden (Sverigetopplistan)	75

== Release history ==
Region	Date	Format	Label
Sweden	20 February 2016	Digital download	Warner Music Sweden
