= Save Me (Wiktoria song) =

2016 song by Wiktoria

Single by Wiktoria
- Released: 28 February 2016
- Genre: Pop; country pop
- Length: 2:58
- Label: Moon Man Records
- Songwriter(s): Jens Siverstedt; Lauren Dyson; Jonas Wallin

Wiktoria singles chronology
"Jag behöver dig" (2011)	"Save Me" (2016)	"Yesterday R.I.P." (2016)

"Save Me" is a song by Swedish singer Wiktoria. The song was released in Sweden as a digital download on 28 February 2016, and was written by Jens Siverstedt, DYSON, and Jonas Wallin. It took part in Melodifestivalen 2016, and qualified to the final from the second semi-final. It was placed fourth in the jury voting but second in the televoting, ending fourth after the combination of the votes.

== Charts ==
=== Weekly charts ===
Chart (2016)	Peak position
Sweden (Sverigetopplistan)	3

=== Year-end charts ===
Chart (2016)	Position
Sweden (Sverigetopplistan)	88

== Release history ==
Region	Date	Format	Label
Sweden	28 February 2016	Digital download	Moon Man Records
