= Constellation Prize (song) =

Single by Robin Bengtsson
- Released: 28 February 2016
- Genre: Pop
- Length: 3:02
- Label: Capitol Music Group Sweden
- Songwriter(s): Bobby Ljunggren; Henrik Wikström; Martin Eriksson; Mark Hole
- Producer(s): Martin Eriksson

Robin Bengtsson singles chronology
"Nothing In Return" (2014)	"Constellation Prize" (2016)	"Stevie Wonder" (2016)

"Constellation Prize" is a song by Swedish singer Robin Bengtsson. The song was released in Sweden as a digital download on 28 February 2016, and was written by Bobby Ljunggren, Henrik Wikström, Mark Hole, and Martin Eriksson. It took part in Melodifestivalen 2016, and qualified to the final from the first semi-final. It placed fifth in the final.

== Track listing ==
Digital download
No.	Title	Length
1.	"Constellation Prize"	3:01

== Charts ==
=== Weekly charts ===
Chart (2016)	Peak position
Sweden (Sverigetopplistan)	2

=== Year-end charts ===
Chart (2016)	Position
Sweden (Sverigetopplistan)	98

== Certifications ==
Region	Certification	Certified units/sales
Sweden (GLF)	2× Platinum	80,000^{‡}
^{‡} Sales+streaming figures based on certification alone.

== Release history ==
Region	Date	Format	Label
Sweden	28 February 2016	Digital download	Capitol Music Group Sweden
