= Radiohjälpen =

Swedish humanitarian organisation

Radiohjälpen (Swedish for 'The Radio Help') is a Swedish humanitarian organisation and foundation that is organised by Sveriges Radio AB, Sveriges Television AB and Sveriges Utbildningsradio AB.
