= Svea (singer) =

American musician (born 1999)

SVEA
- Born: Svea Virginia Kågemark; 1999 (age 26–27); Stockholm, Sweden
- Occupations: Singer; songwriter

Svea Virginia Kågemark (born 1999), also known under the artist name SVEA, is a Swedish singer and songwriter living in Stockholm.

== Biography ==
She was born 1999 in Stockholm. She grew up in Hammarby Sjöstad.

Svea started by posting covers on YouTube that attracted the attention of producers in the industry. These introduced her to an A&R at Universal Music Sweden who chose to sign Svea on her 18th birthday.

Svea has studied singing at Rytmus Musikgymnasium in Stockholm like alumni Robyn, Tove Lo and Icona Pop.

She released her first song "Don't Mind Me" the same day (8 June 2018) as she took the student's exam from Rytmus Musikgymnasium. "Don't Mind Me" ended up on Spotify Viral in Sweden and made headlines because she sang about female masturbation.

In 2019, she released a 7-track EP This Is. It received a mixed review in Dagens Nyheter.

In January 2019, she released the song "Complicated" together with the Danish artist Alexander Oscar. "Complicated" ended up in 16th place on Spotify's most listened songs in Denmark and has sold platinum in Denmark and gold in Norway. On 15 June, SVEA performed at Brilliant Minds 2019, an international conference hosted by Spotify founder Daniel Ek and manager Ash Pournouri. In the fall of 2019, she was associated with Picture This at their concerts in the UK and Germany, resulting in 13 shows. In 2020, Svea released her second EP entitled Pity Party. Svea also wrote Rhys Spotify It Hits single "We Don't Talk Anyway". On New Year's Eve 2020, Svea performed together with Zikai on SVT's 'Tolvslaget på Skansen' with the song "Don't Stop The Music", a cover of Rihanna's song of the same name, which was made exclusively for the performance.

== Discography ==
=== EP ===
- This Is (2019)
- Pity Party (2020)

=== Singles ===
- "Don't Mind Me" (2018)
- "Selfish" (2018)
- "Complicated" with Alexander Oscar (2019)
- "Love Me Now" (2019)
- "Good at Losing" (2019)
- "Numb" featuring Ernia (2020)
- "Give & Take" with Wankelmut (2020)
- "All My Exes" (2020)
- "Need to Know" with Alexander Oscar (2020)
- "Never Call Me Again" (2020)
- "I'll Get Better"
- "Don't Stop the Music" with Zikai (2020)
- "I'll Get Better" with Call Me Loop (2021)
- "Iconic" (2022)
