= Rollercoaster (Dolly Style song) =

Single by Dolly Style
- Released: 28 February 2016
- Genre: Dance-pop
- Length: 3:00
- Label: Capitol Music Group
- Songwriters: Thomas G:son; Peter Boström; Alexandra Salomonsson

Dolly Style singles chronology
"Upsy Daisy" (2015)	"Rollercoaster" (2016)	"Unicorns & Ice Cream" (2016)

"Rollercoaster" is a song by Swedish group Dolly Style. The song was released in Sweden as a digital download on 28 February 2016, and was written by Thomas G:son, Peter Boström, and Alexandra Salomonsson. It took part in the fourth semi-final of Melodifestivalen 2016. It qualified to the Second Chance round (Andra Chansen), where it was eliminated.

== Track listing ==
Digital download
No.	Title	Length
1.	"Rollercoaster"	3:00

== Chart performance ==
=== Weekly charts ===
Chart (2016)	Peak position
Sweden (Sverigetopplistan)	27

== Release history ==
Region	Date	Format	Label
Sweden	28 February 2016	Digital download	Capitol Music Group
