= Put Your Love on Me =

2016 single by Boris René

Single by Boris René
- Released: 20 February 2016
- Genre: Soul; R&B
- Length: 3:02
- Label: Giant Records
- Songwriter(s): Boris René; Tobias Lundgren; Tim Larsson

Boris René singles chronology
"Alive" (2013)	"Put Your Love on Me" (2016)	"Mon Amour" (2016)

"Put Your Love on Me" is a song by Swedish singer and footballer Boris René. The song was released in Sweden as a digital download on 20 February 2016, and was written by René along with Tobias Lundgren and Tim Larsson. It took part in Melodifestivalen 2016, and qualified to andra chansen from the third semi-final. In andra chansen, it qualified to the final, where it placed tenth.

== Track listing ==
Digital download
No.	Title	Length
1.	"Put Your Love on Me"	3:02

== Charts ==
=== Weekly charts ===
Chart (2016)	Peak position
Sweden (Sverigetopplistan)	12

== Release history ==
Region	Date	Format	Label
Sweden	20 February 2016	Digital download	Giant Records
