= Nikki Flores =

American singer-songwriter

- Born: October 17, 1988 (age 37)
- Origin: Fontana, California, U.S.
- Genres: Pop, R&B
- Occupations: Singer-songwriter, actress
- Years active: 2003–present
- Website: http://www.nikkiflores.com

Nikki Flores (born October 17, 1988) is an American independent pop singer, musician, songwriter, and record producer.

== Career ==
=== Recording artist ===
Nikki Flores began writing songs and performing at eight years old. Her parents, who are both musicians, built a home studio allowing her to perform. Flores was signed to Epic Records in 2005, at age 16. She recorded two unreleased albums, including This Girl, which featured "Strike", written and produced by Ryan Tedder; she was released from the label in 2009.

At this time Flores collaborated with producer Brian Kennedy for a song entitled "Let It Slide". She uploaded a demo version of "Let It Slide" to her Myspace page and it received over 19 million views and reached No. 1 on the Myspace Top 100 charts. She is proud of this song because of how relatable it is to her audience. "I was only writing about something that was so true for me in my life at that time. I released it on a whim and the response I got was overwhelming," she said.

In 2010, Flores signed onto Ryan Tedder's Patriot Records, administered by Universal Republic. Tedder and Flores parted ways when the label was dissolved in 2012, and she turned her attention to writing with and for other artists.

=== Songwriting career ===
In 2012, Flores co-wrote and was featured on "Roses" by Nas which was a deluxe edition bonus track on Life is Good.

She contributed lyrics and melodies to "Coolin" on Mýa's Smoove Jones; "Empty Words" on Christina Aguilera's Lotus; and "One Bad Night", "Palace", and "Sleepover" for Hayley Kiyoko. She had multiple collaborations with JoJo, including "Mad Love" on Mad Love, 2017's "Wonder Woman" and "Save My Soul" from EP III, which was praised by media outlets such as Billboard, Rap Up and Idolator.

Flores is also known in Asia, writing the song "Golden Touch" for Namie Amuro's Genic which was a No. 1 album in Japan. She wrote "Rush" and "Gold" for Riri, and "Whatta Man" for I.O.I, which peaked at No. 2 on the Gaon Digital Chart on August 7–13, 2016, with 128,760 downloads sold and 2,752,097 streams. Flores has written for YG recording artists in South Korea.

=== XII XV EP ===
In 2015, Flores enlisted the help of producer/musician Blake Stranathan, long time collaborators The Family (Linnea Deb, Joy Deb, Anton Malmberg Hård af Segerstad), and producers Glashaus to build her first release. The project was emotionally centered around ending a six-year relationship and the phases of finding herself in the aftermath. Her website noted influences of Frank Ocean, Mariah Carey, Aaliyah and Kanye West.

In 2016, Flores digitally released two promotional singles, "Canary" (September 9) and "How to Love Her" (October 28), along with music videos shot and directed by Topshelf Junior (Jhene Aiko, Kehlani). On December 8, Flores released XII XV, a six-song EP which peaked at No. 20 on the US iTunes pop charts the week of its release.

== Discography ==
Year	Song	Album	Artist	Producer/writer
2023	"Best Summer"	Beep Beep EP	Jessica Jung	Nikki Flores, Tha Aristocrats
2021	"Because The Night" (featuring Nikki Flores)	Horror Show	The Midnight	Tim McEwan, Tyler Lyle, Nikki Flores
2021	"Zero:Attitude"	Non-album single	Soyou and Iz*One featuring pH-1	Galactika, pH-1, Nikki Flores
2018	"We Are The Light" (featuring Nikki Flores)	We Are The Light	Markus Schulz	Markus Schulz, Nikki Flores
2017	"Light Years" (featuring Nikki Flores)	Nocturnal	The Midnight	Tim McEwan, Tyler Lyle, Nikki Flores
2017	"Wonder Woman"		JoJo	Nikki Flores, Joanna Levesque, Josh Monroy
2017	"Over Again"	Day of the Don	Dondria Nicole	Nikki Flores, Bryan Michael Cox, August Grant
2017	"Rush"		RIRI	Nikki Flores, Andy Love, Joacim Persson, Johan Alkenas
2017	"Sleepover"		Hayley Kiyoko	Nikki Flores, Hayley Kiyoko, Jonathan Dorr, Cecil Bernardy
2016	"Canary"	XII XV EP	Nikki Flores	Nikki Flores, Blake Lee
2016	"Say It"	XII XV EP	Nikki Flores	Nikki Flores, Linnea Deb, Joy Deb, Anton Malmberg Hård af Segerstad
2016	"How To Love Her"	XII XV EP	Nikki Flores	Nikki Flores, Blake Lee
2016	"2:01 am"	XII XV EP	Nikki Flores	Nikki Flores, Blake Lee
2016	"About You"	XII XV EP	Nikki Flores	Nikki Flores, Blake Lee
2016	"After All"	XII XV EP	Nikki Flores	Nikki Flores, Thomas Glashausser, Daniel Glashausser
2016	"Gold"		RIRI	Nikki Flores, Steve Daly, Justin Gray
2016	"Mad Love"	Mad Love	JoJo	Nikki Flores, Joanna Levesque, Josh Monroy
2016	"One Bad Night"	Citrine EP	Hayley Kiyoko	Nikki Flores, Hayley Kiyoko, Bram Inscore
2016	"Palace"	Citrine EP	Hayley Kiyoko	Nikki Flores, Hayley Kiyoko, Jonathan Dorr, Cecil Bernardy
2016	"XFaded"		O'G3NE	Nikki Flores, Justin Gray
2016	"Whatta Man (Good Man)'"	Whatta Man	I.O.I	Nikki Flores, Philip Bentley, Emile Ghantous, Stephen Daly, Ryan S. Jhun
2016	"Jason" (feat. Nikki Flores)	Endless Summer	The Midnight	Tim McEwan, Tyler Lyle & Nikki Flores
2016	"California"	Hello I'm Saara	Saara	Nikki Flores, Linnea Deb, Joy Deb, Anton Malmberg Hård af Segerstad
2016	"Leaving LA"	Watch The World	Markus Schulz	Nikki Flores, Markus Schulz
2016	"My Heart Wants Me Dead"	Melodifestivalen 2016	Lisa Ajax	Nikki Flores, Linnea Deb, Joy Deb, Anton Malmberg Hård af Segerstad, Sara Forsberg
2016	"I Will Wait"	Melodifestivalen 2016	Isa	Nikki Flores, Linnea Deb, Joy Deb, Anton Malmberg Hård af Segerstad, Sara Forsberg
2016	"Coolin'"	Smoove Jones	Mýa	Nikki Flores, Dennis-Manuel Peters, Daniel Coriglie, Mario Bakovic, Mýa
2015	"Born To Be Alive"	Nine	Samantha Jade	Nikki Flores, Clarence Coffee, The Fliptones
2015	"Galaxies"		Lena	Nikki Flores, Robin Grubert, Stefan Skarbek
2015	"Save My Soul"	III.	JoJo	Nikki Flores, Linnea Deb, Joy Deb, Anton Malmberg Hård af Segerstad
2015	"Silhouette"	Right Here Right Now	Jordin Sparks	Nikki Flores, Lars Halvor Jensen, Johannes R. Joergensen
2015	"Selfish Girls"	Rumors EP	Jake Miller	Jean Robert Redwine, Nikki Flores, Jake Miller, David Quinones, Nicholas Furlong
2015	"Someday"	Perfectly Damaged	Måns Zelmerlöw	Nikki Flores, Linnea Deb, Joy Deb, Anton Malmberg Hård af Segerstad, Måns Zelmerlöw
2015	"Unbreakable"	Perfectly Damaged	Måns Zelmerlöw	Nikki Flores, Linnea Deb, Joy Deb, Anton Malmberg Hård af Segerstad, Måns Zelmerlöw
2015	"Golden Touch"	Genic	Namie Amuro	Nikki Flores, Andy Love, Joacim Persson, Johannes R Joergensen
2014	"Ghost"	Lion Heart	Jake Miller feat. Nikki Flores	The Fliptones, Nikki Flores, Jake Miller
2012	"Roses"	Life is Good (Deluxe Edition)	Nas featuring Nikki Flores	Al Shux, Dan Wilson, Nasir Jones, Redd Stylez and Nikki Flores
2012	"Empty Words"	Lotus (Deluxe Edition)	Christina Aguilera	Busbee, Nikki Flores, Ali Tamposi and Christina Aguilera
2012	"Lips"	Touch	Miss A	Fuego, Redd Stylez, Nikki Flores
2010	"City Lights"		Nikki Flores	Ryan Tedder, Nikki Flores, Noel Zancanella, Steve Perry, Neal Schon
2008	"Let It Slide"		Nikki Flores	Brian Kennedy, Nikki Flores, Jayson Sanchez
2007	"Painkiller"	Almost Famous: The Sexy Lady EP	Nikki Flores featuring Yung Berg	Danja, The Clutch
2007	"A Little Obsessed"	3rd Base	Jamali (band)	Billy Mann, Nikki Flores
2007	"I Wanna Know You Like That"	TCG EP	The Cheetah Girls	Evan Rogers, Carl Sturken, Nikki Flores
2006	"Strike"	Aquamarine	Nikki Flores	Ryan Tedder, Denise Pearson, Nikki Flores

== Miscellaneous ==
Year	Song	Artist	Credit
2009	"Got Dynamite"	Demi Lovato	Studio background vocals
2012	"Shine Ya Light"	Rita Ora	Vocal Producer
2012	"Missing Me"	Keyshia Cole	Studio background vocals, vocal producer
2013	"Love LA"	Emblem 3	Studio background vocals
2014	"Bind Your Love"	Cher Lloyd	Studio background vocals
2014	"Adrenalina"	Wisin feat. Jennifer Lopez & Ricky Martin	Studio background vocals
2015	"Somebody Loves You"	Charlie Wilson	Studio background vocals

== Filmography ==
- 2007 – Super Sweet 16: The Movie
- 2007 – Yo Gabba Gabba!
- 2016 – Dancey Dance
