= Boy Destroy =

- Born: October 23, 1994 (age 30)
- Origin: Sweden
- Genres: indiepop, Trap
- Labels: Dew Process (AU, NZ), Loyalty Obsession

Boy Destroy (born 23 October 1994), is a Swedish artist and songwriter based in Gothenburg, Sweden. His legal name is Leo Pär Jonsson Skyvell.

After releasing a number of singles, the EP Warpaint EP was released on 15 April 2021. An interview about the EP was made for the Swedish public service network SVT by Linn Koch-Emmery for the programme PSL.

Jack Saunders also picked the song "You Don't Want Me When I'm Sober" as "Tune of the week" for his radioshow "The Future Artist Show" on BBC Radio 1 in the UK.

His music has been described as a mix between punk, trap and pop and takes influence from artists such as Joji, Jeff Buckley and My Chemical Romance. The song "You Don't Want Me When I'm Sober" was added on rotation to Swedish public service radio Sveriges Radio P3.

In Februari 2021 Jack Saunders on BBC Radio 1 named Boy Destroy's debut single ”Warpaint” his ”Tune of the week” on the Future Artist show.

== Career ==
During the summer of 2020 Boy Destroy released a number of videos on youtube that together created what became known as an unofficial Visual EP hinting of the upcoming releases.

On 30 September 2020 Boy Destroy officially debuted with the single "Warpaint".

== Discography ==
=== Singles ===
- "Warpaint" (Loyalty Obsession, Dew Process) [2020]
- "As Time Goes By" (Loyalty Obsession, Dew Process) [2020]
- "You Don't Want Me When I'm Sober" (Loyalty Obsession, Dew Process) [2021]
- "Beautiful Crimes" (Loyalty Obsession, Dew Process) [2021]

=== EPs ===
- "Warpaint EP" (Loyalty Obsession, Dew Process) [2021]
