= Runaways (Eclipse song) =

Single by Eclipse
- Released: 28 February 2016
- Genre: Rock
- Length: 2:59
- Label: Blowout Productions
- Songwriter(s): Erik Mårtensson

Eclipse singles chronology
"Stand On Your Feet" (2015)	"Runaways" (2016)

"Runaways" is a song by Swedish band Eclipse. The song was released in Sweden as a digital download on 28 February 2016, and was written by Erik Mårtensson. It took part in Melodifestivalen 2016, and placed fifth in the fourth semi-final.

== Track listing ==
Digital download
No.	Title	Length
1.	"Runaways"	2:59

== Chart performance ==
=== Weekly charts ===
Chart (2016)	Peak position
Sweden (Sverigetopplistan)	68

== Release history ==
Region	Date	Format	Label
Sweden	28 February 2016	Digital download	Blowout Productions
