= Håll om mig hårt =

Single by Panetoz
- Released: 28 February 2016
- Genre: Worldbeat
- Length: 2:56
- Label: PNTZ
- Songwriters: Jimmy Jansson; Karl-Ola Kjellholm; Jakke Erixson; Pa Modou Badjie; Njol Badjie; Nebeyu Baheru

Panetoz singles chronology
"Norge" (2015)	"Håll om mig hårt" (2016)

"Håll om mig hårt" (English: Hold me hard) is a song by Swedish group Panetoz. The song was released in Sweden as a digital download on 28 February 2016, and was written by Jimmy Jansson, Karl-Ola Kjellholm, Jakke Erixson, Pa Modou Badjie, Njol Badjie, and Nebeyu Baheru. It took part in Melodifestivalen 2016, and qualified to andra chansen from the fourth semi-final. In andra chansen, it qualified to the final. It placed eighth in the final.

== Charts ==
Chart (2016)	Peak position
Sweden (Sverigetopplistan)	5

== Release history ==
Region	Date	Format	Label
Sweden	28 February 2016	Digital download	PNTZ
