= Youniverse (song) =

Single by Molly Sandén
- Released: 28 February 2016
- Genre: Pop
- Length: 3:02
- Label: Molly Sandén AB
- Songwriter(s): Molly Sandén; Danny Saucedo; John Alexis

Molly Sandén singles chronology
"Like No One's Watching" (2015)	"Youniverse" (2016)	"Rygg mot rygg" (2017)

"Youniverse" is a song by Swedish singer Molly Sandén. The song was released in Sweden as a digital download on 28 February 2016, and was written by Sandén along with Danny Saucedo and John Alexis. It took part in Melodifestivalen 2016, and qualified to the final from the fourth semi-final. It placed sixth in the final.

== Track listing ==
Digital download
No.	Title	Length
1.	"Youniverse"	3:02

== Charts ==
Chart (2016)	Peak position
Sweden (Sverigetopplistan)	8

== Certifications ==
Certifications for "Youniverse"
Region	Certification	Certified units/sales
Sweden (GLF)	Platinum	40,000^{‡}
^{‡} Sales+streaming figures based on certification alone.

== Release history ==
Region	Date	Format	Label
Sweden	28 February 2016	Digital download	Molly Sandén AB
