= Kizunguzungu =

Single by SaRaha
- Released: 20 February 2016
- Genre: Dance-pop; Worldbeat
- Length: 3:04
- Label: Made4This Music
- Songwriters: Anderz Wrethov; Sara Larsson; Arash Labaf

SaRaha singles chronology
| "Tuongee" (2015) | "Kizunguzungu" (2016) | "Kengele" (2016) |

"Kizunguzungu" (English: Dizziness) is a song by Swedish-Tanzanian singer SaRaha. The song was released in Sweden as a digital download on 20 February 2016, and was written by SaRaha along with Anderz Wrethov and Arash Labaf. It took part in Melodifestivalen 2016, and qualified to andra chansen from the third semi-final. In andra chansen, it qualified to the final. It placed ninth in the final.

== Track listing ==
Digital download
| No. | Title | Length |
|---|---|---|
| 1. | "Kizunguzungu" | 3:04 |

== Chart performance ==
| Chart (2016) | Peak position |
|---|---|
| Sweden (Sverigetopplistan) | 2 |

== Release history ==
| Region | Date | Format | Label |
|---|---|---|---|
| Sweden | 20 February 2016 | Digital download | Made4This Music |
