= SaRaha =

Swedish-Tanzanian singer and songwriter

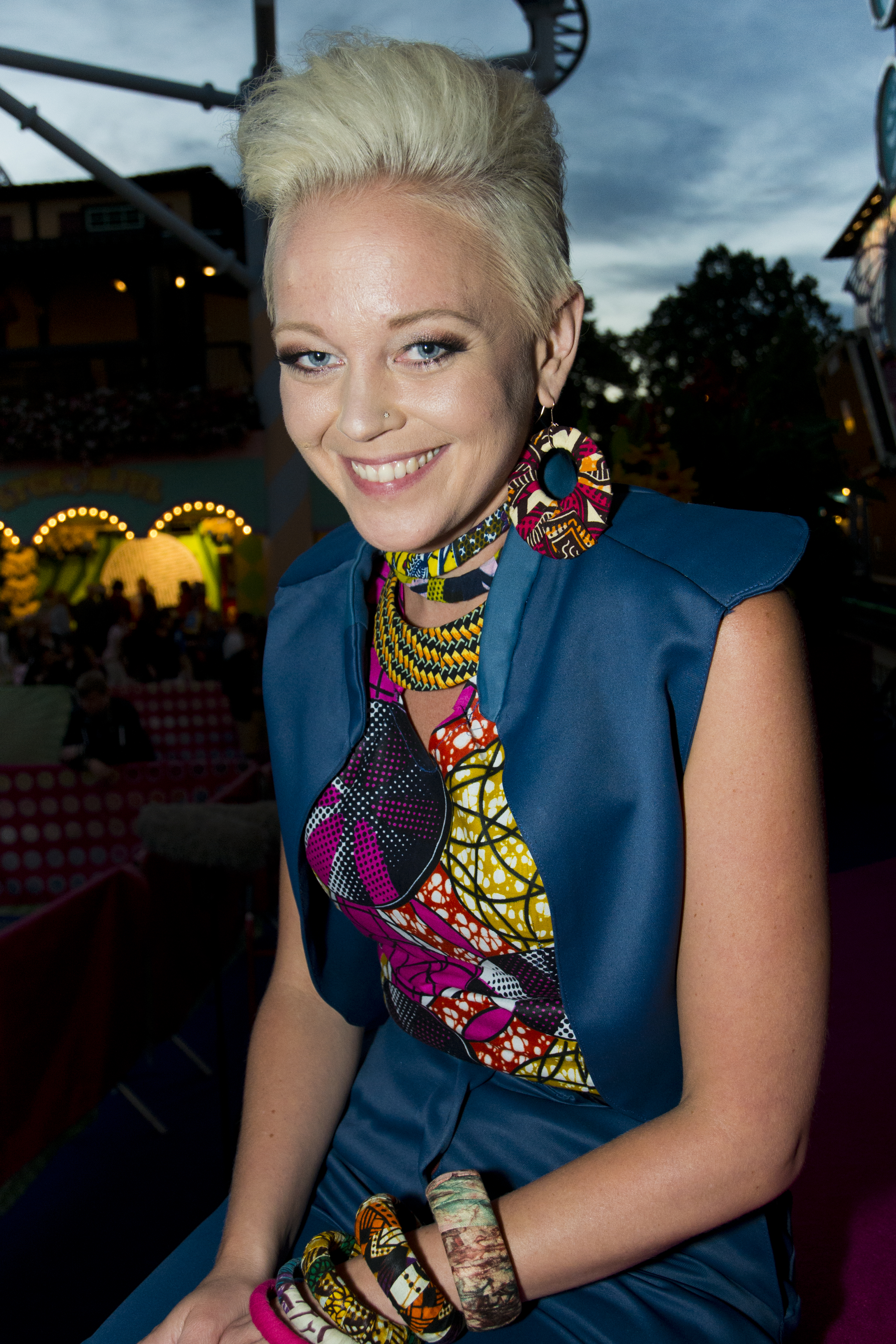
- SaRaha at Sommarkrysset in 2016

Background information
- Also known as: Sara Ryan
- Born: Sara Kristina Larsson; 26 June 1983 (age 42); Vänersborg, Sweden
- Origin: Tanzania
- Genres: World; dance-pop
- Occupations: Singer; songwriter
- Years active: 2003–present

Sara Kristina Larsson (born 26 June 1983), known professionally by her stage name SaRaha and also as Sara Ryan, is a Swedish-Tanzanian singer and songwriter. She first achieved public attention in Sweden during Melodifestivalen 2016.

== Life and career ==
Larsson was born on 26 June 1983 in Vänersborg, Sweden and soon moved to Tanzania with her family in 1985. At age 18, she moved to Zimbabwe which is where she began her music career, performing with Zimbabwean bands in Harare. She later returned to Tanzania in 2009. In 2011, she released the song "Tanesco" which became her breakout hit in Tanzania. She later released the song "My Dear", and released her debut album Mblele Kiza in 2014. The song "Mbele Kiza" later also gained attention in Sweden. She participated in Melodifestivalen 2016 with the song "Kizunguzungu", and qualified to andra chansen from the third semi-final. In the final she placed ninth with the juries, seventh with the Swedish public, and ninth overall.

In Melodifestivalen 2019, she was one of the songwriters for Andreas Johnson's entry "Army of Us". The entry went from the second round to Andra chansen, which was broadcast from Nyköping on March 2.

Sara is the songwriter of Fröken Snusk's song "Unga & fria" in Melodifestivalen 2024, in the second round.

== Discography ==
=== Studio albums ===
Title	Details	Peak chart positions
Title	Details	SWE
Mbele Kiza	Released: 10 April 2014; Label: Spinnup; Format: Digital download	—

=== Singles ===
Title	Year	Peak chart positions	Certifications	Album
Title	Year	SWE	Certifications	Album
"Tanesco"	2011	—		Mbele Kiza
"Jambazi"	2012	—		Mbele Kiza
"There Is You"	2012	—		Mbele Kiza
"Mbele Kiza"	2013	—		Mbele Kiza
"Unieleze" (SaRaha featuring Linex)	2013	—		Mbele Kiza
"Dadido" (SaRaha featuring Big Jahman)	2014	—		Non-album singles
"Shemeji"	2014	—		Non-album singles
"Kila Ndoto" (SaRaha featuring Marlaw)	2014	—		Non-album singles
"Kizunguzungu"	2016	2	GLF: 2× Platinum	Non-album singles
"—" denotes a single that did not chart or was not released in that territory.

==== Featured singles ====
- "My Dear" (Akil feat. SaRaha) (2011)
- "Fei" (Fid Q feat. SaRaha) (2011)
- "Don't Cry" (Makamua feat. SaRaha) (2012)
- "Usiku wa giza" (Nako 2 Nako feat. SaRaha) (2012)
- "Siongopi" (Joh Makini feat. SaRaha) (2012)
- "Mazoea" (Big Jahman feat. SaRaha & Nura) (2012)
- "Dream" (Hustler Jay feat. SaRaha) (2013)
- "Ghetto Love" (Magenge ft. SaRaha) (2013)
- "Chips Mayai" (Q Chilla feat. SaRaha) (2013)
- "Habibty" (Akil feat. SaRaha) (2014)
- "Tuongee" (Makamua feat. SaRaha) (2015)
