= Wiktoria Johansson =

Swedish singer and songwriter (born 1996)

Wiktoria
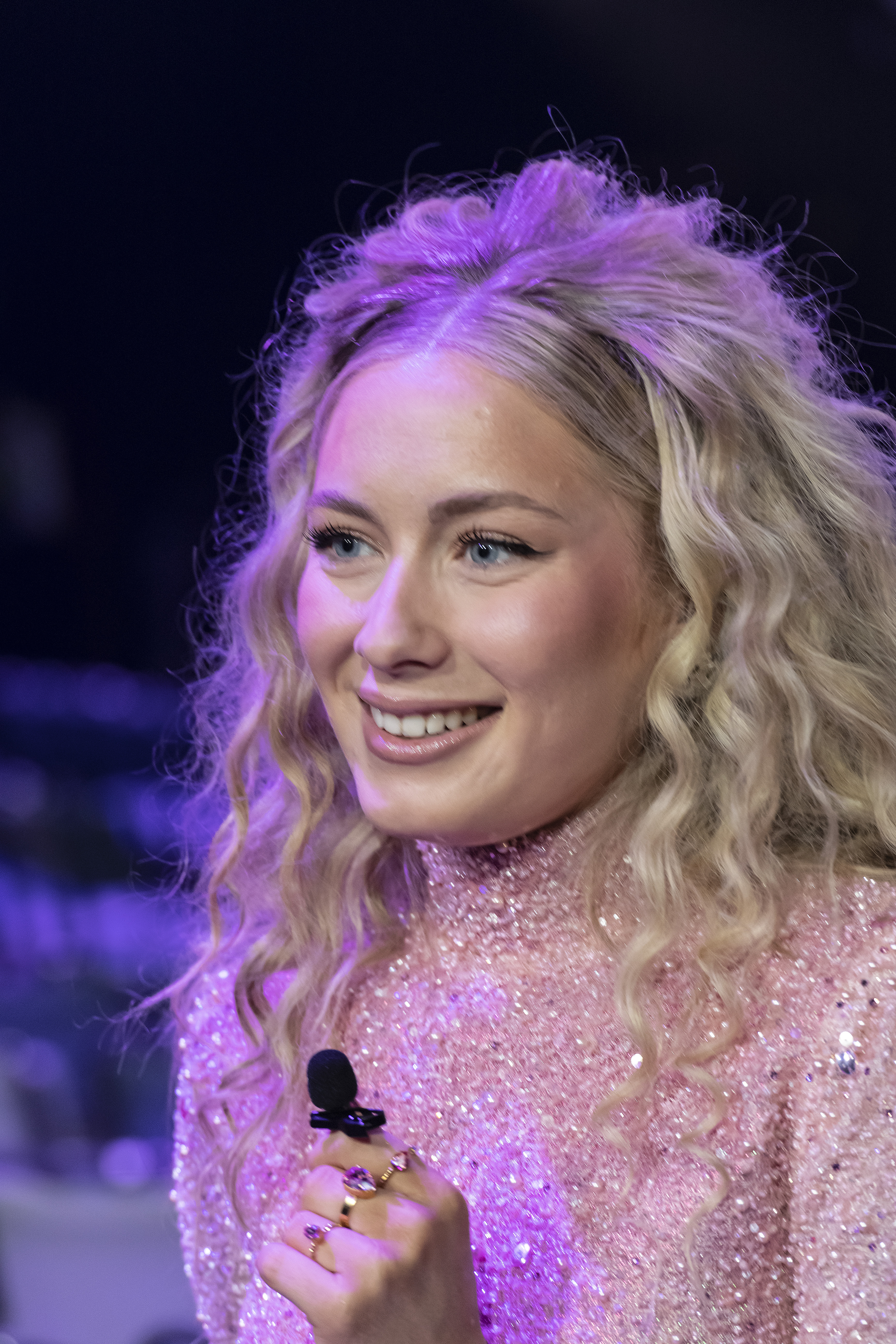
- Johansson at Melodifestivalen in 2023

Background information
- Born: Wiktoria Vendela Johansson; 8 November 1996 (age 29); Brämhult, Sweden
- Genres: pop; country pop; folk pop
- Occupations: singer; songwriter
- Years active: 2011–present

Wiktoria Vendela Johansson (born 8 November 1996), known simply as Wiktoria, is a Swedish singer and songwriter. She first achieved public attention during Melodifestivalen 2016, where she placed fourth.

== Life and career ==
Johansson was born on 8 November 1996 in Brämhult, a suburb of Borås. In 2011, she participated in Lilla Melodifestivalen and placed fourth with the self-penned song "Jag behöver dig". On 30 November 2015, Johansson was announced as one of the 28 participants in Melodifestivalen 2016 with the song "Save Me". She performed last in the second semi-final held on 13 February 2016, and qualified directly to the final. In the final, Johansson placed fourth with the juries, second with the Swedish public, and fourth overall. Johansson also voiced Moana in the Swedish dub of the 2016 film Moana.

She competed in Melodifestivalen 2017 with the song "As I Lay Me Down", qualifying once again directly to the final, where she finished sixth overall; eight with the juries, and second with the public. She was the Swedish spokesperson in the Eurovision Song Contest 2017, and toured with the Diggiloo Tour (in Swedish: Diggilooturnén), during the summer. She participated in Stjärnornas stjärna broadcast on TV4 in 2018, where she finished in fifth place out of eight contestants. She participated in Melodifestivalen 2019 with the song "Not with Me", qualifying directly to the final for the third time, where she finished sixth overall; sixth with the juries and eighth with the public.

On 30 April 2021, Wiktoria released "Need You to Know" and announced the forthcoming release of her debut album, which was released in June 2021. She returned to Melodifestivalen 2023 with the song "All My Life (Where Have You Been)" but fell within her heat, finishing fifth out of seven.

"En vän till mig" was released on 19 September 2024, being her first Swedish-language single since 2011.

== Discography ==
=== Studio albums ===
List of studio albums
Title	Album details
Exposed	Released: 11 June 2021; Label: Moon Man, Sony; Formats: digital download, streaming

=== Singles ===
Title	Year	Peak chart positions	Certifications	Album
Title	Year	SWE	Certifications	Album
"Jag behöver dig"	2011	—		Non-album singles
"Save Me"	2016	3	GLF: Platinum	Non-album singles
"Yesterday R.I.P."	2016	—		Non-album singles
"Unthink You"	2016	—		Non-album singles
"As I Lay Me Down"	2017	2	GLF: 2× Platinum	Non-album singles
"I Won't Stand in Your Way"	2017	—		Non-album singles
"Not Just for Xmas"	2017	—		Non-album singles
"Perfect Memory"	2018	—		Non-album singles
"I Told Santa"	2018	94		Non-album singles
"Not with Me"	2019	5	GLF: Platinum	Non-album singles
"OMG"	2019	— (Note: "OMG" did not enter the Swedish Singellista Chart, but peaked at number four on the Swedish Heatseeker Chart.)		Non-album singles
"We Don't Talk"	2020	—		Exposed
"Fuck This Place Up" (with Hayes, featuring Famous Dex)	2020	—		Non-album single
"Come to Me (64567)"	2020	—		Exposed
"Me"	2020	—		Exposed
"H2BU" (Hard to Be You)	2020	—		Non-album singles
"One Wish for Christmas"	2020	76		Non-album singles
"Need You to Know"	2021	—		Exposed
"All My Life (Where Have You Been)"	2023	— (Note: "All My Life (Where Have You Been)" did not enter the Swedish Singellista Chart, but peaked at number two on the Swedish Heatseeker Chart.)		Non-album single
"En vän till mig"	2024	—		Non-album single
"—" denotes a single that did not chart or was not released in that territory.

== Filmography ==
Year	Title	Role	Notes
2016	Moana	Moana	Swedish dub
2018	Ralph Breaks the Internet	Moana	Swedish dub
2024	Moana 2	Moana	Swedish dub
