= Himmelstalundshallen =

Ice hockey arena in Norrköping, Sweden

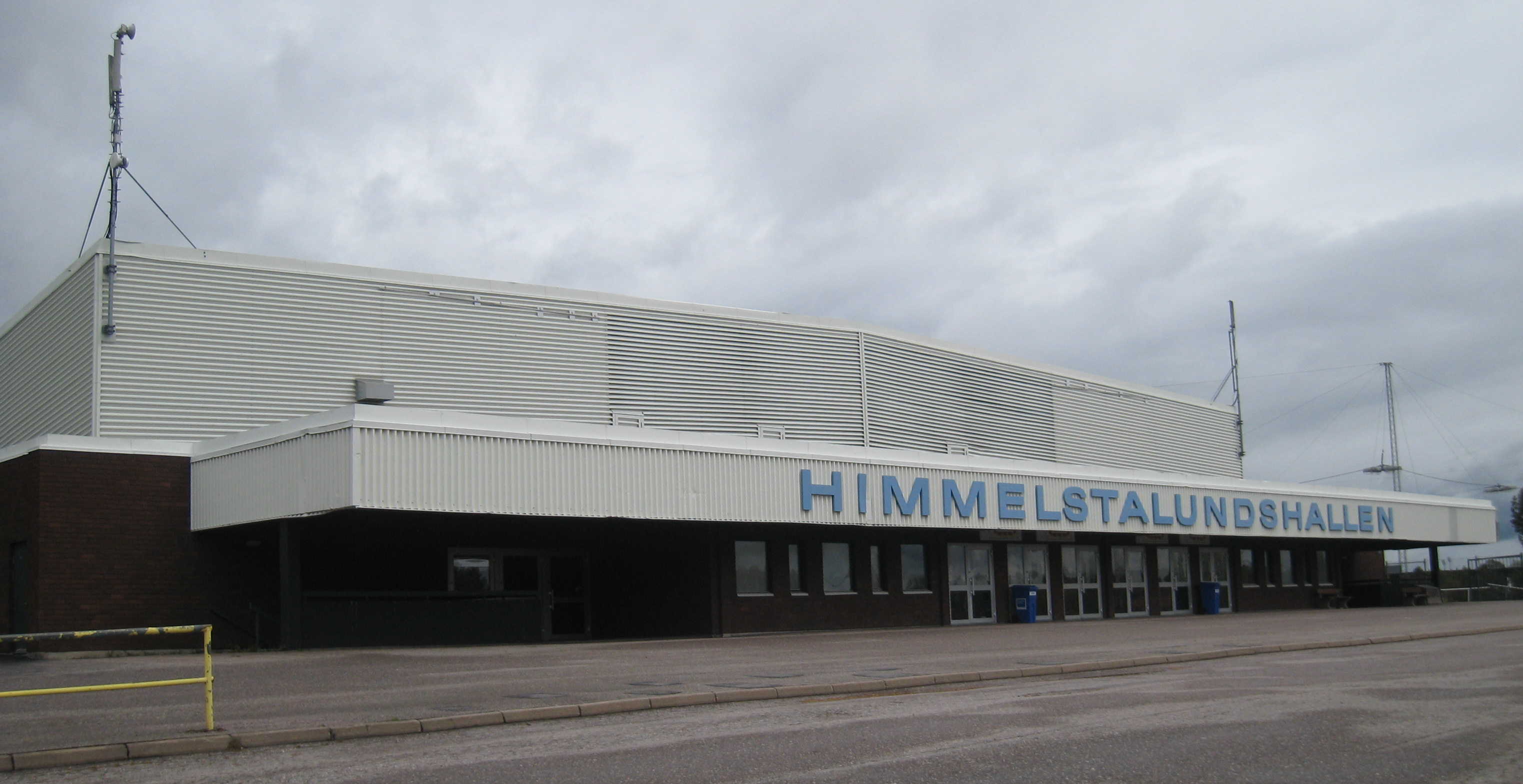
- Himmelstalundshallen in May 2012
- Interactive map of Himmelstalundshallen
- Location: Norrköping, Sweden
- Coordinates: 58°35′16″N 16°8′25″E
- Capacity: Hockey: 4,280

Construction
- Opened: 7 October 1977
- Architect: Hans Gade

Tenants
- HC Vita Hästen (Division 1 Sweden) (1977–present); Norrköpings Damishockeyförening (Division 2 Sweden) (2002–present)

Himmelstalundshallen is an indoor arena in Norrköping, Sweden. It is home arena for the ice hockey team HC Vita Hästen and holds 4,280 people. Construction was completed on 4 October 1977 and the arena was inaugurated with a ceremony lasting for three days between 7–9 October the same year. On 29 November that year, an indoor soccer competition was played in Himmelstalundshallen, won by Hammarby IF.

The arena hosted the preliminary games of group B at the men's FIBA European Basketball Championship in September 2003.

== See also ==
- List of indoor arenas in Sweden
- List of indoor arenas in Nordic countries
