= David Lindgren =

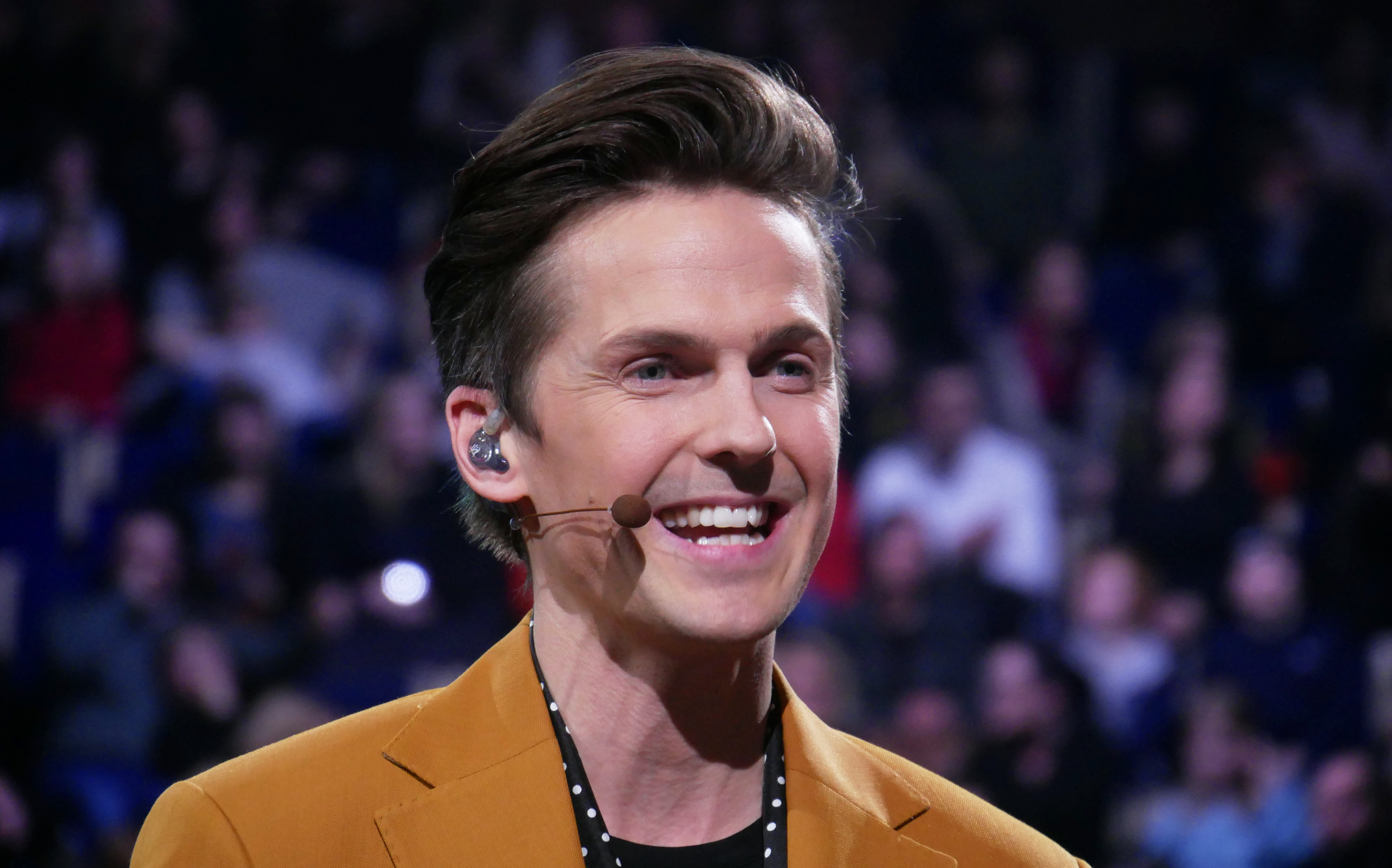
- Lindgren at Melodifestivalen 2018 in Karlstad

Background information
- Born: Johan David Stellan Lindgren; 28 April 1982 (age 44); Skellefteå, Sweden
- Genres: Pop
- Occupations: Singer, musical artist and television presenter
- Years active: 2009–present
- Labels: EMI Sweden; Warner Music Sweden

Johan David Stellan Lindgren (born 28 April 1982) is a Swedish singer and television presenter. He is signed to the EMI Sweden label.

== Biography ==
Johan David Stellan Lindgren was born 28 April 1982 in Nederkalix. He grew up in Ersmark.

In 2009, he appeared on the Swedish television show Så ska det låta on SVT in the same team as Kicki Danielsson and Putte Nelsson. In 2010, he appeared on the show for a second time with Jessica Heribertsson. His third appearance on the same popular show was on 20 January 2013, competing together with teammate Jennifer Brown. Lindgren presented Let's Dance 2021, 2022 along with Petra Mede and Let's Dance 2023 along with Kristin Kaspersen. He participated as a celebrity dancer in Let's Dance 2025 broadcast on TV4.

=== Melodifestivalen ===
In 2012, he took part in the Swedish Melodifestivalen 2012. In the second heat, his song "Shout It Out" co-written by Fernando Fuentes and Tony Nilsson made it to the Globen final on 10 March 2012 and finished 4th overall. The cover portrait of "Shout It Out" single is photographed by Martin Botvidsson.

He participated in Melodifestivalen 2013 with the song "Skyline" co-written by Fernando Fuentes, Henrik Nordenback and Christian Fast. After his performance in an initial semi-final round on 2 February 2013, he finished 1st/2nd – advancing directly to the Melodifestivalen finals which were held on 9 March 2013, where he finished 8th, with 69 points.

He participated in Melodifestivalen 2016 with "We Are Your Tomorrow". After performing the second semi-final on 13 February, he moved to the Melodifestivalen finals to be held on 12 March 2016. He finished 11th, with 39 points. On 30 September 2016, SVT announced that Lindgren will host all six shows of Melodifestivalen 2017 alongside Clara Henry and Hasse Andersson. On 2 November 2017, SVT announced that Lindgren alone will host all six shows of Melodifestivalen 2018, along with his sidekick Fab Freddie.

== Personal life ==
Lindgren is married to Kristina Lindgren, they have a son named Ben, born in 2011 and a daughter, Ella.

== Discography ==
=== Albums ===
Album Title	Album details	Peak chart positions	Certifications
Album Title	Album details	SWE	Certifications
Get Started	Released: 2012; Label: EMI Sweden; Format: CD	1	
Ignite the Beat	Released: 2013; Label: EMI Sweden; Format: CD	2	

=== Singles ===
Title	Year	Peak chart positions		Certifications	Album
Title	Year	SWE	TUR	Certifications	Album
"Shout It Out"	2012	8	112	GLF: 2× Platinum	Get Started
"Skyline"	2013	17	—	GLF: Gold	Ignite the Beat
"We Are Your Tomorrow"	2016	27	—	GLF: Gold	Non-album single
"—" denotes a single that did not chart or was not released in that territory.
