= Molly Hammar =

Swedish singer and songwriter

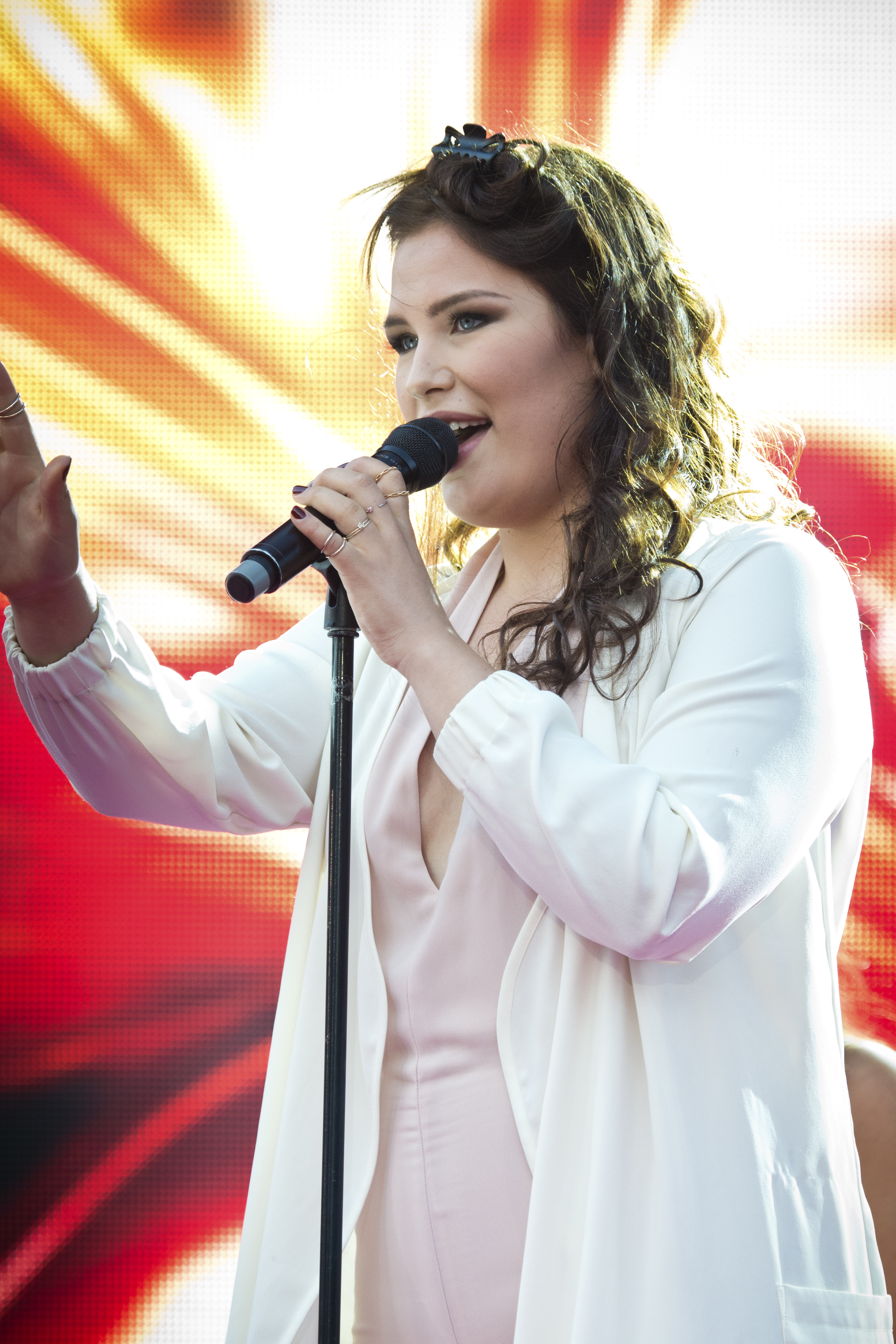

Background information
- Also known as: Molly Pettersson Hammar
- Born: Ella Molly Natalia Pettersson Hammar; 16 October 1995 (age 30); Umeå, Sweden
- Genres: Pop; R&B
- Occupations: Singer, songwriter
- Years active: 2011–present
- Label: Cosmos Music

Ella Molly Natalia Pettersson Hammar (born 16 October 1995), known professionally as Molly Hammar, is a Swedish singer and songwriter who participated in the talent show Idol 2011 broadcast on TV4, where she reached fourth place.

== Career ==
=== 2011: Idol ===
In September 2011 Molly took part in the eighth season of Idol. In the quarter-finals she sang Alicia Keys' "A Woman's Worth", she finished in the Top 12 and progressed through to the Semi-final. In the Semi-final she sang U2's "Where the Streets Have No Name", she progressed to the Finals. In the Finals she made it through the final 4 before being eliminated.

=== 2015–present: Melodifestivalen ===
Hammar participated in Melodifestivalen 2015 with the song "I'll Be Fine", finishing sixth in the semi-final and being eliminated. The song peaked at number 65 on the Swedish Singles Chart. However the song peaked at number 6 on Digilistan (The Swedish download chart) ahead of the songs that qualified for Andra Chansen.

She competed in Melodifestivalen 2016 with the song "Hunger", and qualified to andra chansen from the second semi-final before being eliminated. She co-wrote the Maltese song for the Eurovision Song Contest 2016 "Walk on Water" performed by Ira Losco. She performed with Ira Losco as her backing vocalist at the Eurovision Song Contest.

== Personal life ==
Molly Pettersson Hammar was previously in a relationship with singer Robin Stjernberg whom she met during her time at Idol, until 2015.

== Discography ==
=== Singles ===
List of singles, with selected chart positions and certifications
Title	Year	Peak chart positions	Certifications	Album
Title	Year	SWE	Certifications	Album
"I'll Be Fine"	2015	65		Melodifestivalen 2015
"Something Right"	2015	—		Non-album single
"Hunger"	2016	57		Melodifestivalen 2016
"Liberate"	2016	—		Sex
"Blossom"	2018	—		Sex
"No Place Like Me" (featuring Big Narstie)	2019	—		Non-album singles
"Words"	2019	— (Note: "Words" did not enter the Swedish Singellista Chart, but peaked at number 15 on the Swedish Heatseeker Chart.)		Non-album singles
"Show Me" (featuring Kim Cesarion)	2019	— (Note: "Show Me" did not enter the Swedish Singellista Chart, but peaked at number 15 on the Swedish Heatseeker Chart.)		Non-album singles
"Shortcuts (I Can't Wait)"	2019	—		Non-album singles
"Alone"	2020	—		Non-album singles
"Get to Know Me First" (with Julie Bergan and AWA)	2020	— (Note: "Get to Know Me First" did not enter the Swedish Singellista Chart, but peaked at number 13 on the Swedish Heatseeker Chart.)		Non-album singles
"Love Me Blind"	2021	—		Love Me Blind
"Ingen annan rör mig som du"	2022	1	GLF: 2× Platinum	Så mycket bättre 2022 – Tolkningarna
"På riktigt"	2022	94		Så mycket bättre 2022 – Tolkningarna
"Regnar och regnar"	2022	18	GLF: Gold	Så mycket bättre 2022 – Tolkningarna
"Can't Stay Away"	2022	80		Så mycket bättre 2022 – Tolkningarna
"Så nära"	2022	79	GLF: Gold	Så mycket bättre 2022 – Tolkningarna
"All My Friends"	2023	— (Note: "All My Friends" did not enter the Swedish Singellista Chart, but peaked at number nine on the Swedish Heatseeker Chart.)		Non-album singles
"Fight Like a Girl"	2023	— (Note: "Fight Like a Girl" did not enter the Swedish Singellista Chart, but peaked at number 16 on the Swedish Heatseeker Chart.)		Non-album singles
"Deep Down"	2023	— (Note: "Deep Down" did not enter the Swedish Singellista Chart, but peaked at number nine on the Swedish Heatseeker Chart.)		Non-album singles
"I fönstret på andra sidan gatan"	2024	— (Note: "I fönstret på andra sidan gatan" did not enter the Swedish Singellista Chart, but peaked at number 20 on the Swedish Heatseeker Chart.)		Non-album singles
"Beredd" (with Per Gessle)	2024	— (Note: "Beredd" did not enter the Swedish Singellista Chart, but peaked at number six on the Swedish Heatseeker Chart.)		Non-album singles
"Misstro" (with Albin Lee Meldau)	2024	98		Non-album singles
"Någon kommer älska dig igen" (with Ricky Rich)	2025	48		Non-album singles
"—" denotes a single that did not chart or was not released.
