= Joy Deb =

Swedish songwriter

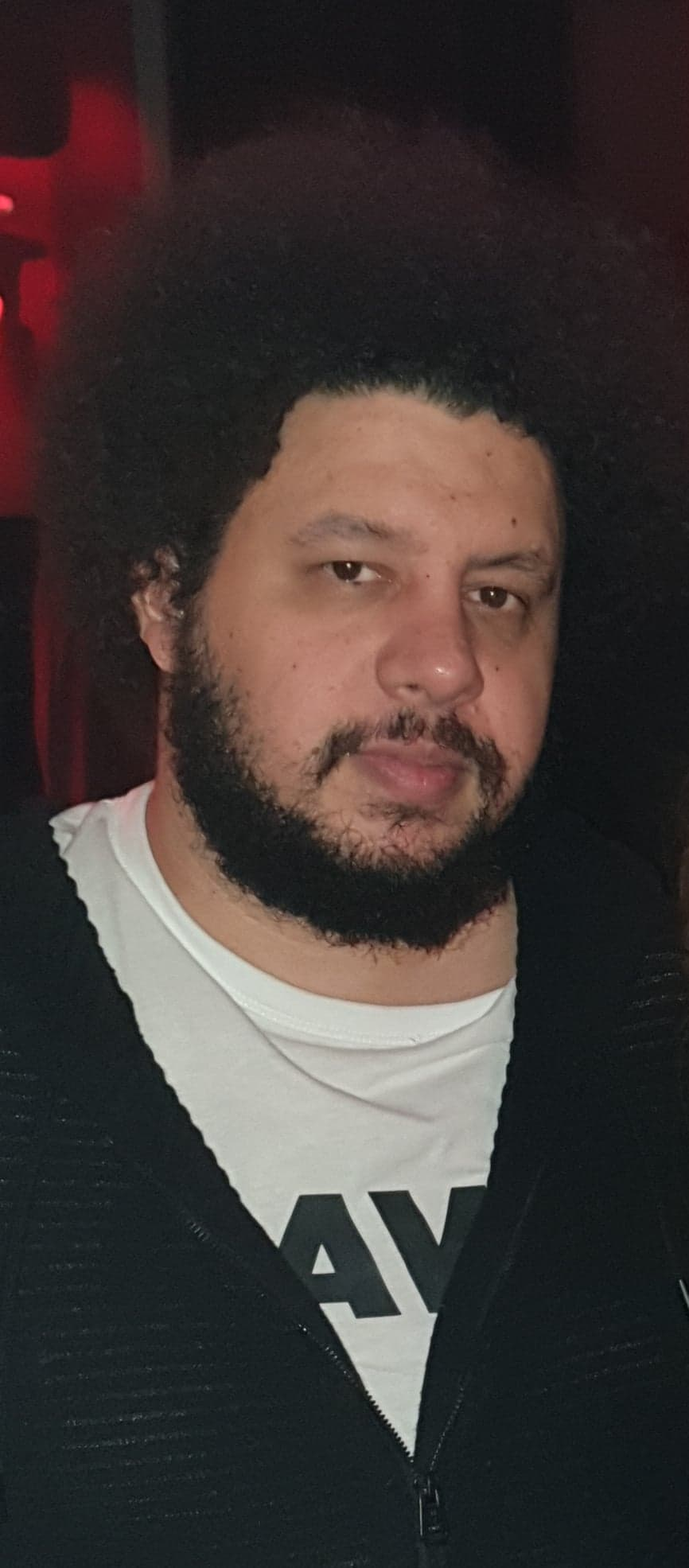

Background information
- Born: Joy Neil Mitro Deb; 14 January 1979 (age 47)
- Origin: Stockholm, Sweden
- Genres: Pop; pop rock; electropop; R&B
- Occupations: Songwriter; record producer
- Label: Northbound Music Group

Joy Neil Mitro Deb (born 14 January 1979) is a Swedish songwriter and producer. He has worked with artists such as Fifth Harmony, JoJo, Mic Lowry and Akon.

Deb is signed to Northbound Music Publishing in Stockholm, where he is a member of the production team "The Family" together with Linnea Deb and Anton Hård af Segerstad. Earlier (2013–2016) the group was signed to BMG Publishing.

Joy studied at the music writing academy Musikmakarna.

== Early life ==
Deb was born to an Indian father and a Finnish mother.

== Eurovision Song Contest ==
Joy Deb, alongside Linnea Deb and Anton Hård af Segerstad, is notable for his work in the Eurovision Song Contest, both in the contest and in national selections. They are most present in Sweden's annual Eurovision selection Melodifestivalen, in which they have three wins. The first winning song in 2013, "You" by Robin Stjernberg, broke a Swedish record for most played song during one day and it got nominated for a Swedish Grammy as Song of the Year 2014. The second winning song, "Heroes" performed by Måns Zelmerlöw in 2015, won the Eurovision Song Contest 2015 and sold 5× Platinum in Sweden and Gold in Spain, Norway and Austria. They won Melodifestivalen once again in 2024 with Unforgettable performed by Marcus & Martinus.

Deb was also involved as lyricist, composer and producer of the Käärijä and Baby Lasagna song #eurodab, which featured as interval act during the Eurovision Song Contest Grand Finale 2025.

=== Eurovision Song Contest ===
| Year | Country | Song | Artist | Co-written with | Final | Points | Semi | Points |
|---|---|---|---|---|---|---|---|---|
| 2013 | Sweden | "You" | Robin Stjernberg | Linnea Deb, Robin Stjernberg, Joakim Harestad Haukaas | 14 | 62 | Host country | |
| 2015 | Sweden | "Heroes" | Måns Zelmerlöw | Linnea Deb, Anton Malmberg Hård af Segerstad | 1 | 365 | 1 | 217 |
| 2018 | Finland | "Monsters" | Saara Aalto | Linnea Deb, Saara Aalto, Ki Fitzgerald | 25 | 46 | 10 | 108 |
| 2021 | San Marino | "Adrenalina" | Senhit | Linnea Deb, Chanel Tukia, Tramar Dillard, Jimmy "Joker" Thörnfeldt, Kenny Silverdique, Malou Linn, Eloise Ruotsalainen, Suzi Pancenkov, Senhit Zadik Zadik, Thomas Stengaard | 22 | 50 | 9 | 118 |
| 2021 | Sweden | "Voices" | Tusse | Linnea Deb, Jimmy "Joker" Thörnfeldt, Anderz Wrethov | 14 | 109 | 7 | 142 |
| 2024 | Malta | "Loop" | Sarah Bonnici | Linnea Deb, Johan Emil Johansson, Kevin Lee, Sebastian Pritchard-James, Liere Gotxi Angel, Matthew James Borg, Michael Joe Cini, Sarah Bonnici | Failed to qualify | | 16 | 13 |
| 2024 | Sweden | "Unforgettable" | Marcus & Martinus | Linnea Deb, Jimmy "Joker" Thörnfeldt, Marcus Gunnarsen, Martinus Gunnarsen | 9 | 174 | Host country | |

== International releases ==
Joy has also written and produced several international hits. He co-wrote the first record 'Top Down' on Fifth Harmony's 'Reflection' Album. Also, Joy and his current production team wrote and produced JoJo's comeback single 'Save My Soul'.

In 2016, "Oh Lord" was released with the British vocal harmony boy band Mic Lowry. The song was the group's debut single and it was written by Joy, Linnea Deb, Anton Hård af Segerstad, Augustine Grant and Phil Collins, as the song contains lyrics and music from Phil Collins' song "In the Air Tonight".

=== Discography ===
- Top Down by Fifth Harmony
- Heroes by Måns Zelmerlöw

Winner of ESC 2015. Nr 1 in 22 Countries.

3× Platinum in Sweden. Gold in Spain, Norway and Austria.

- Busy Doin Nothin by Ace Wilder

Nr 1 on ‘the Swedish Singles chart’. Swedish Grammy nominee for song of the year in 2015.

5× Platinum in Sweden.

- Oh lord by Mic Lowry
- Therapy by Kim Cesarion
- Save My Soul by JoJo

Jojo's comeback single.

The track reached No.3 on ‘the real-time Billboard + Twitter Trending 140’ chart. It also peaked position 33 on US Billboards ‘Pop Digital Songs’ chart.

- You by Robin Stjernberg

In 2013 the song broke a Swedish record for most played song during one day. Swedish Grammy nominee for ‘Song of the year’ 2014

3× Platinum in Sweden.

- Don't worry by Ace Wilder

The song is featured in the trailer for ‘Bridget Jones's baby’.

- My heart wants me dead by Lisa Ajax

It peaked position no.10 on ‘the Swedish Single’ chart.

- Hunger by Molly Pettersson Hammar

It peaked position no.57 on ‘the Swedish Single’ chart.

- I will wait by ISA

It peaked position no. 35 on ‘the Swedish Single’ chart.

- Free Somebody by Luna
- Soldiers by Ulrik Munther
- Bring out the fire by Andreas Weise
- #Fail by Oscar Zia
- Echo by Outtrigger
- Paradise by The Rasmus
- Monsters by Saara Aalto
