= Anderz Wrethov =

Swedish songwriter (born 1979)

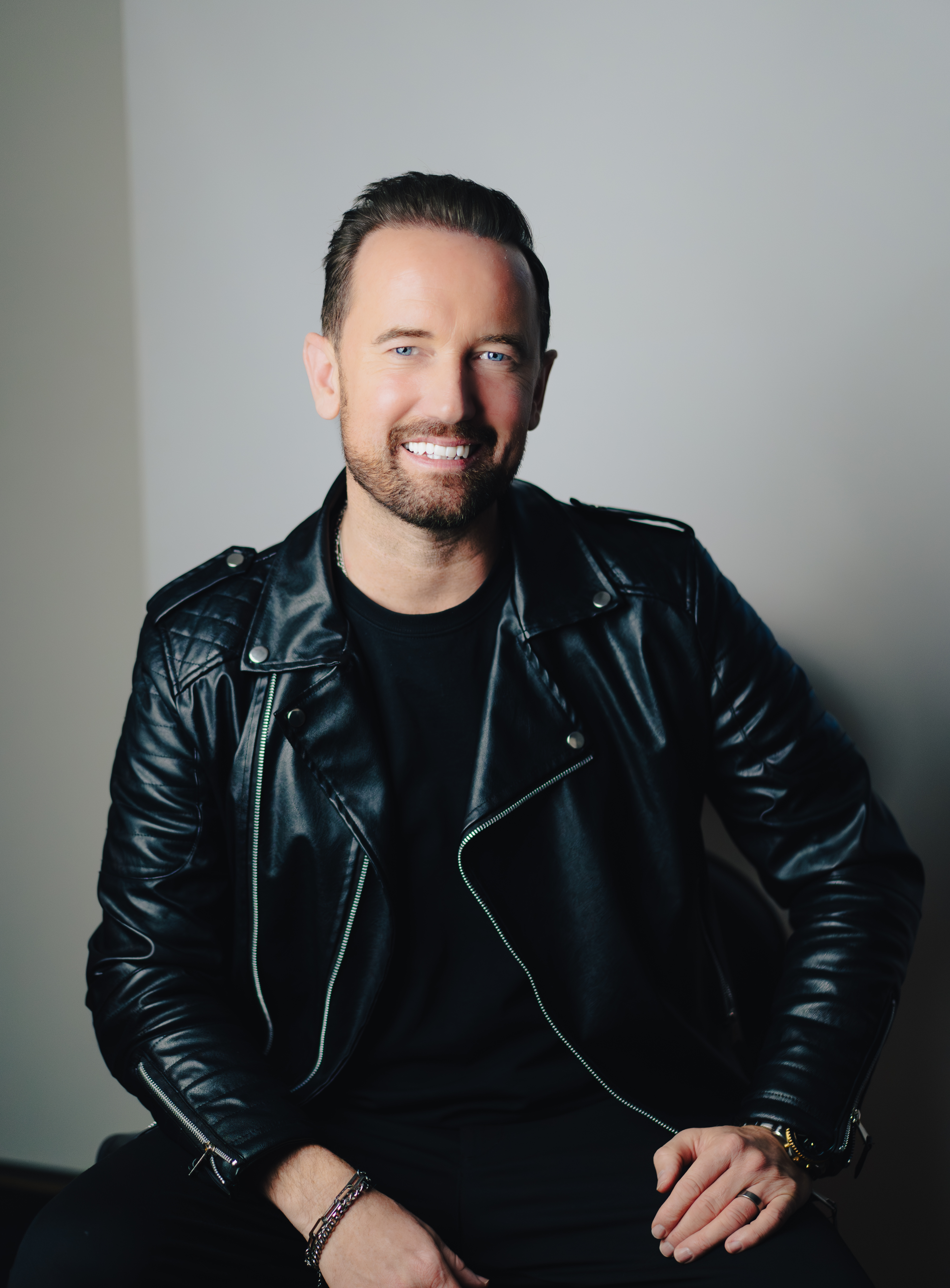
- Wrethov in 2024

Background information
- Born: Anderz Wrethov; 11 April 1979 (age 47); Trelleborg, Sweden
- Genres: Pop; rock; dance-pop; pop rock; Europop; R&B
- Occupations: Songwriter; producer

Anderz Wrethov (born 11 April 1979) is a Swedish songwriter and producer. He is a songwriter as part of Melodifestivalen, in which he has written 48 competing entries, the third most of all songwriters, winning three times in 2019, 2021 and 2025.

== Biography ==
Wrethov was born in Trelleborg and grew up in Vellinge. He graduated from Musikhögskolan in Malmö in 2002. He sings and plays the piano and the guitar.

He began learning to play the guitar at the age of seven, and also took piano lessons. In the 1980s he started listening to hard rock music, and playing the electric guitar.

Since graduating from Musikhögskolan, where he studied guitar, piano and song, he has worked as a producer and songwriter.

== Career ==
Wrethov has worked with a number of artists in Sweden and abroad; he and his sister Elin were part of the songwriting team for the song Always, the Azerbaijani entry to the Eurovision Song Contest 2009, which placed in third in the final. He has also co-written and produced songs for Melodifestivalen, the Swedish qualifying contest for the Eurovision Song Contest, several times. In 2018 he co-wrote the Cypriot entry for the Eurovision Song Contest 2018, Fuego performed by Eleni Foureira which placed second in the competition. In 2019 he co-wrote four of the entries, including the winning song, "Too Late For Love". In 2021, he was part of the team that wrote and produced the song "Voices", which won the Melodifestivalen in that year. He also wrote the official song for the Swedish football team for the FIFA Women's World Cup in 2011. In 2025, he won Melodifestivalen again as one of the songwriting team of "Bara bada bastu" by Kaj, which ultimately finished fourth at the Eurovision Song Contest 2025 in Basel, Switzerland. In 2026, he won the San Marino Song Contest as one of the songwriting team of the song "Superstar" by Senhit which is going to compete in the Eurovision Song Contest 2026 in May.

In 2011, Wrethov released his first single and made his debut as a singer.

In 2015, for the Japanese release of the film Avengers 2: Age Of Ultron, Marvel Japan recruited Wrethov to compose an original song, "In Memories", an emotional ballad that also featured in the movie’s Japanese trailers.
