= 100% =

100% may refer to:

- 1 (number), the equivalent to 100%

== Music ==
=== Albums ===
- 100% (Angela Dimitriou album) or the title song, 1998
- 100% (Beverley Knight album) or the title song, 2009
- 100% (Lotta Engberg album) or the title song, 1988
- 100%, by Alonzo, or the title song, 2017
- 100%, by Jimsaku, 1993
- 100%, by Negazione, 1990
- 100%, by the Slew, 2009

=== EPs ===
- 100% (Monogem EP) or the title song, 2017

=== Songs ===
- "100%" (Big Pun song), 2000
- "100%" (Lotta Engberg and Triple & Touch song), 1988
- "100%" (Mariah Carey song), 2010
- "100%" (Mary Kiani song), 1996
- "100%" (Senidah song), 2019
- "100%" (Sonic Youth song), 1992
- "100%" (Victor och Natten song), 2016
- "100%", by Angelspit from Krankhaus, 2006
- "100%", by DRAM from Big Baby DRAM, 2016
- "100%", by Moloko from Statues, 2003

=== Performers ===
- 100% (band), a South Korean boy group

== Other uses ==
- 100% (comics), a 2002–2003 comic book by Paul Pope
- 100% (game show), a 1997–2001 British game show

== See also ==
- Percentage
- 100% Love (disambiguation)
- 99% (disambiguation)
- 1% (disambiguation)
