= Club One (disambiguation) =

Club One, Club 1, club number 1, may refer to:

- Club One, a chain of health clubs and gyms in San Francisco, California, USA
- Club One (bar), a bar in Savannah, Georgia, USA
- Club One Air, an Indian airline
- golf club number 1
  - 1 wood, the driver
  - 1 iron, the driver

== See also ==
- ClubONE Riviera, a floating restaurant in Hong Kong
- 1 Club (disambiguation)
- Club (disambiguation)
- One (disambiguation)
