= 0.99 =

0.99 may refer to:

- 99% (disambiguation)
- 99p (disambiguation)
- 99 cents (disambiguation)

== See also ==
- 0.999...
- Psychological pricing, where retail prices are often expressed as just-below numbers
