= Marines' Memorial Club =

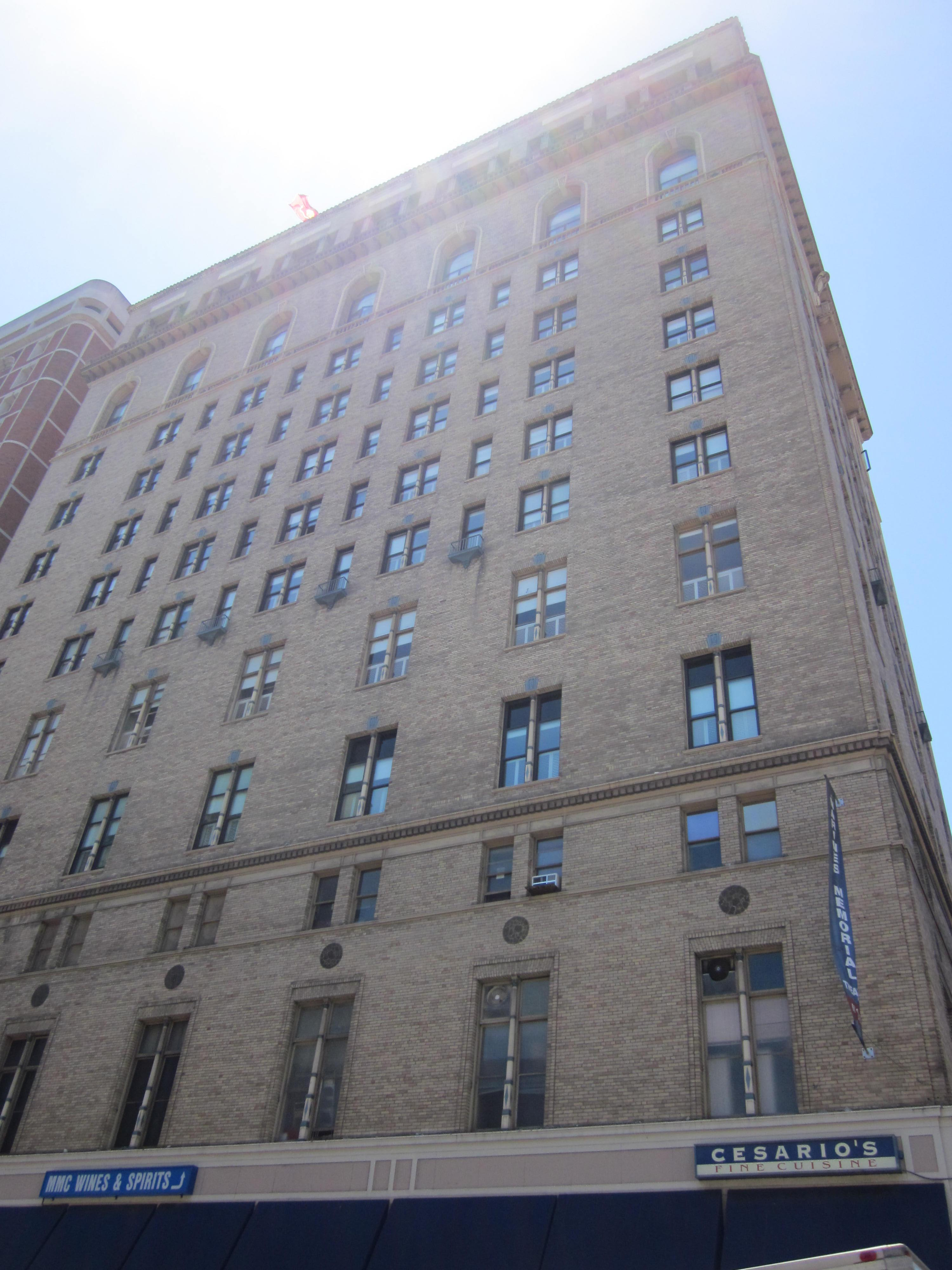
- The Marines' Memorial Club and Hotel

- Location within San Francisco Marines' Memorial Club (California) Marines' Memorial Club (the United States)
- Former names: Western Women's Club

General information
- Architectural style: Spanish Colonial-style
- Location: 609 Sutter Street, San Francisco, California
- Coordinates: 37°47′20.05″N 122°24′37.69″W
- Completed: 1926
- Owner: Marines Memorial Association

Technical details
- Floor count: 12

The Marines' Memorial Club in San Francisco, California at 609 Sutter Street (at Mason), is a 501(c)19 nonprofit veterans charity and private social club for United States Marines and other veterans of the United States Armed Forces. The nonprofit Marines' Memorial Association owns the large building in the Union Square neighborhood of San Francisco that houses a hotel, theater, restaurant/bar, sports club, special event facilities, library, museum, memorial, and a military history bookstore. The facility was built as the Western Women's Club in 1926.

The club operates under laws for 501(c)(19) Post or Organizations of War Veterans; in 2025 it claimed total revenue of $12,033,038 and total assets of $9,690,130. The separate Marines' Memorial Foundation supporting the club is a 501(c)(3) Public Charity. In 2025, it claimed total revenue of $1,296,558 and total assets of $1,305,909.

== Western Women's Club ==
The Western Women's Club building is a 12-story Beaux-Arts-style building, designed by the firm of Walter Danforth Bliss and William Baker Faville, and built in 1926. The Western Women's Club was a member of the General Federation of Women's Clubs. The Western Women's Club building was bought by the Marines Memorial Association in 1947. Western Women's Club had a later location at 111 O'Farrell Street.

== Marines' Memorial Club ==
As a port city since its founding as a military base by Spain, San Francisco has been associated with military personnel – especially the navy – and merchant mariners. During World War II it was a point of embarcation for many service personnel in for the Pacific Theatre. Those who passed through the city before deployment would remember their experience and return after the war.

The Marines' Memorial was opened as a club for veterans of the Marines, although membership is open to all United States servicemembers. Early in 1946, the Commandant of the Marine Corps, General Alexander A. Vandegrift, had proposed a "living memorial" to Marine casualties from the War in the Pacific. A group of Marines arranged to buy a building owned by a women's club at Mason Street and Sutter Street in San Francisco, whose members they had met through their participation in the wartime WAVES program. The club opened on November 10, 1946, the anniversary of the founding of the Marine Corps.

The theater predates the club, and was part of the original 1926 building. In its early days it hosted nationwide radio broadcasts by Bob Hope, Jack Benny, and Frank Sinatra. It later housed the San Francisco Actor's Workshop, which produced plays by Arthur Miller, Tennessee Williams, and Bertolt Brecht. It was also the first home of the American Conservatory Theater.

Today the association has 21,000 members from all branches of the United States military, NOAA, and the Public Health Service, mostly from California.

== Amenities ==
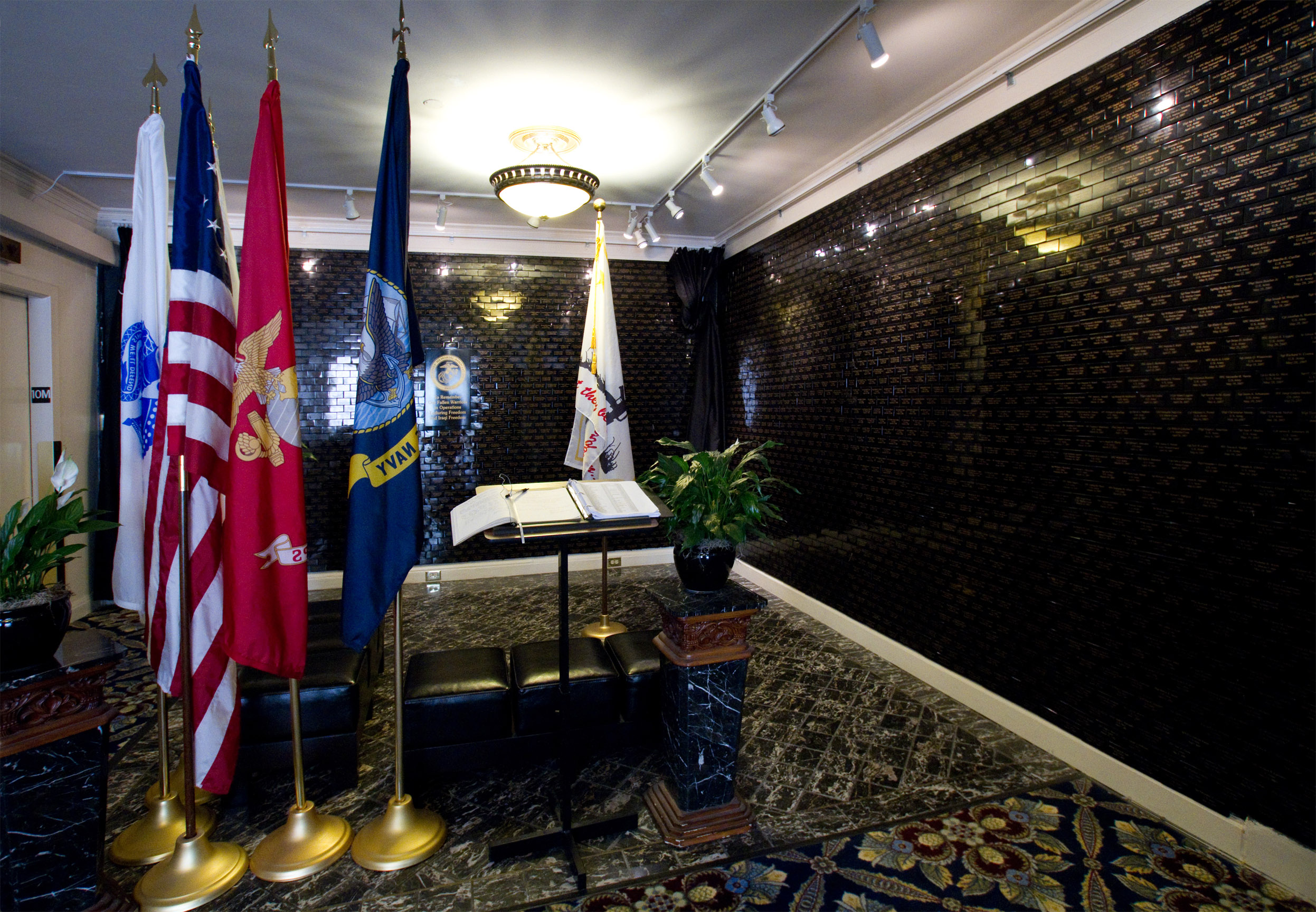
The Tribute Memorial Wall.

The most noticeable features are a 650-seat repertory theater and a lobby display of military memorabilia, most notably the ship's bell from the USS San Francisco. It also includes two restaurants (including the club's "Leatherneck Grill" steakhouse) and a Club One fitness center. The building also includes the Tribute Memorial Wall, a private memorial to American troops killed in the Iraq War and war in Afghanistan.

== See also ==
- List of American gentlemen's clubs
