= Jumbo Kingdom =

Two restaurants in Aberdeen, Hong Kong

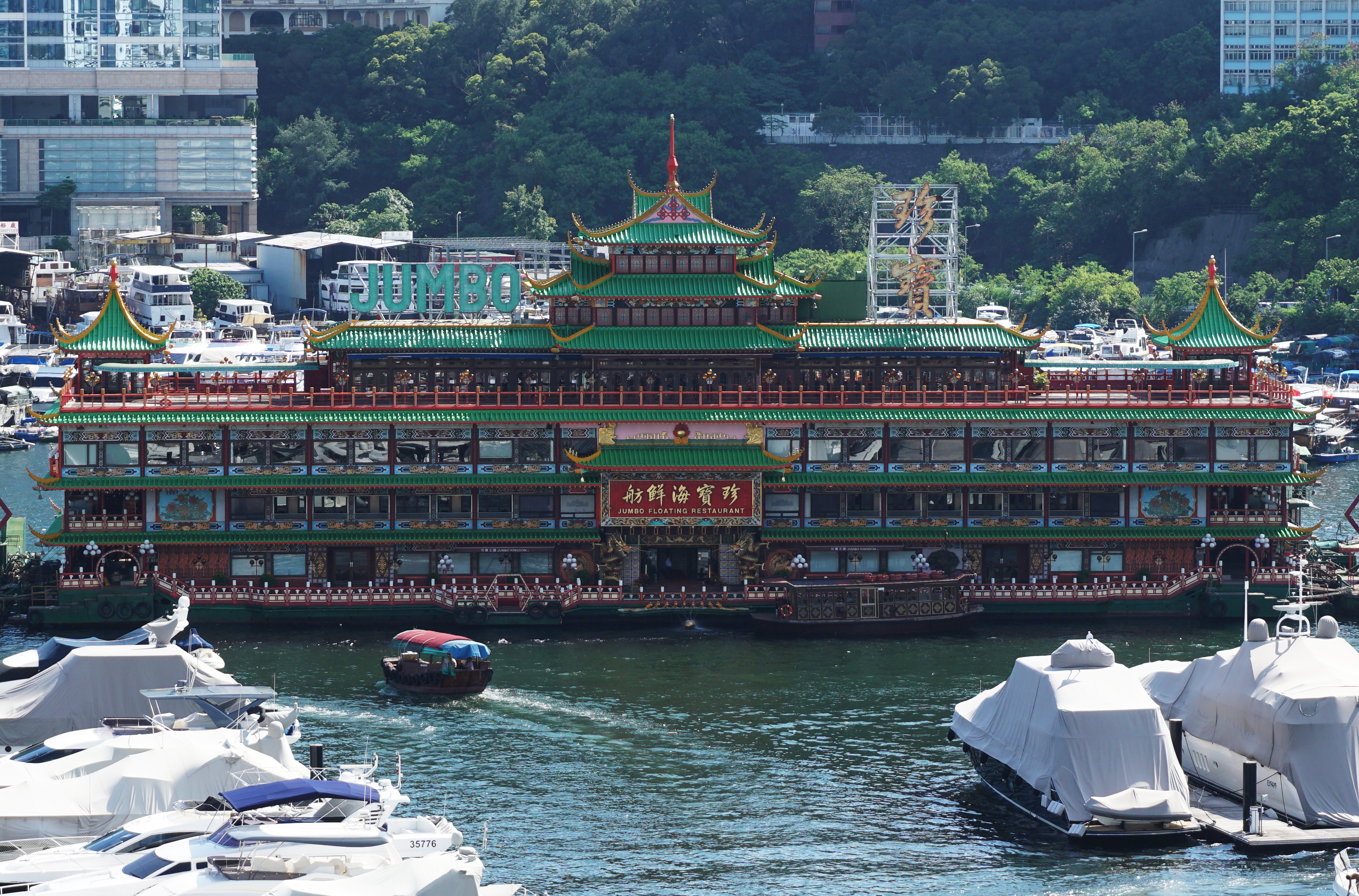
- Jumbo Kingdom in 2017
- Interactive map of Jumbo Kingdom

Restaurant information
- Established: 19 October 1976
- Closed: 3 March 2020 (Jumbo Floating Restaurant capsized on 19 June 2022 after leaving Hong Kong)
- Owner: Stanley Ho
- Food type: Cantonese, dim sum, Western
- Location: Shum Wan Pier Drive, Wong Chuk Hang, Aberdeen, Hong Kong, Hong Kong
- Coordinates: 22°14′35.5″N 114°9′43.2″E
- Seating capacity: 2300
- Website: Official website at the Wayback Machine (archived 2025-06-17)

Jumbo Kingdom
- Traditional Chinese: 珍寶王國
- Literal meaning: Treasure Kingdom
Transcriptions
Yue: Cantonese
- Yale Romanization: Jān bóu wòhng gwok
- Jyutping: Zan1 bou2 wong4 gwok3

Jumbo Floating Restaurant
- Traditional Chinese: 珍寶海鮮舫
Transcriptions
Yue: Cantonese
- Yale Romanization: Jān bóu hói sīn fóng
- Jyutping: Zan1 bou2 hoi2 sin1 fong5

Tai Pak Floating Restaurant
- Traditional Chinese: 太白海鮮舫
Transcriptions
Yue: Cantonese
- Yale Romanization: Taai baahk hói sīn fóng
- Jyutping: Taai3 baak6 hoi2 sin1 fong2

Jumbo Kingdom (Chinese: 珍寶王國) consisted of the Jumbo Floating Restaurant (Chinese: 珍寶海鮮舫) and the adjacent Tai Pak Floating Restaurant (Chinese: 太白海鮮舫), which were tourist attractions in the Aberdeen South Typhoon Shelters within Hong Kong's Aberdeen Harbour. During its 44 years of operation, over thirty million visitors visited Jumbo Kingdom, including Queen Elizabeth II, Jimmy Carter, Tom Cruise, Chow Yun Fat, and Gong Li. A subsidiary, Jumbo Kingdom Manila, operated in Manila Bay, Philippines, but closed after eight years. Jumbo Kingdom was part of Melco International Development Limited, a company listed on the Hong Kong Stock Exchange. It suspended operations in 2020 amidst the COVID-19 pandemic.

On 14 June 2022, the Jumbo Floating Restaurant was towed out of Hong Kong to Cambodia to await a new operator. While transiting in the South China Sea, it experienced bad weather and capsized near the Paracel Islands on 19 June 2022. Its operator has denied describing it as sunk.

== Origin ==
According to a senior editor from the Hong Kong Chronicles Institute, predecessors to floating restaurants were once fishermen's barges from the Guangzhou and Pearl River areas. They had stages built into them for people to host banquets, sing and dance. During the 1920s and 30s, Hong Kong fishermen from Aberdeen began operating similar barges. They originally offered food and banquet services to the fishing community only but gradually began to cater to the rest of the public.

== History ==
The Jumbo Kingdom was established in October 1976 by Stanley Ho after more than HK$30 million were spent to design and build it. It was originally decorated in the style of an ancient Chinese imperial palace. Ho later purchased Tai Pak in 1980 and Sea Palace in 1982, operating all three former competitors under Jumbo Kingdom.

=== Tai Pak Floating Restaurant ===
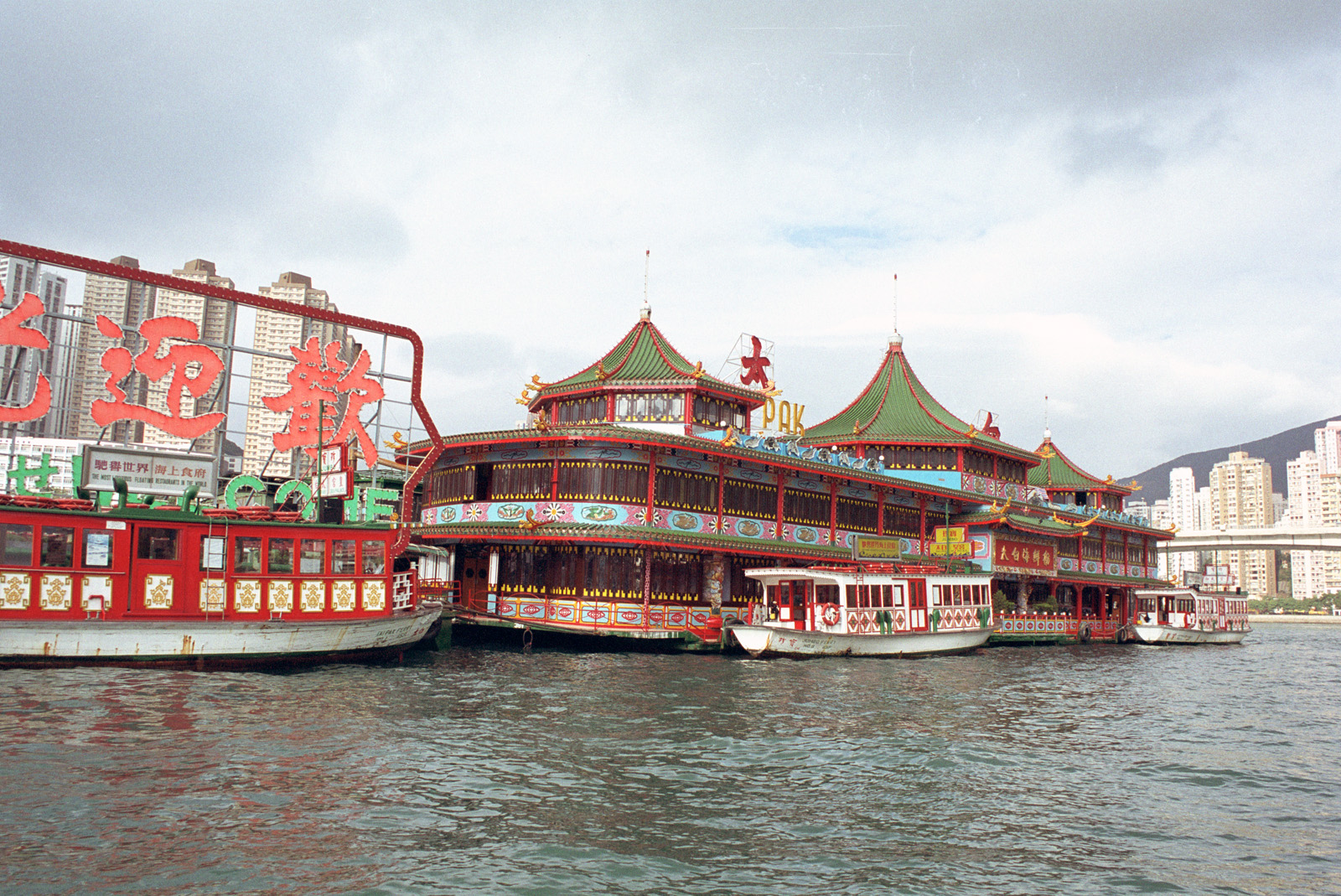
Tai Pak Floating Restaurant in 2007

The Tai Pak Floating Restaurant was established in 1952, when Wong Lo-kat (along with three other investors) purchased a boat and transformed it into a floating restaurant spanning 32 m (105 ft) in length. Six years later, Tai Pak was extended to accommodate 800 guests. A second Tai Pak floating restaurant operated from Castle Peak, now Tuen Mun, and was sold off and relocated to Guangxi in the 1980s.

Due to Tai Pak's smaller size compared to Jumbo, Hong Kong authorities granted Tai Pak permission to remain as a laid-up vessel in 2022 during negotiations with a potential buyer. It was reported that New Bond Ltd obtained ownership of the vessel in August and intended to renovate the restaurant to serve an Asian-Western fusion cuisine and promote Hong Kong tourism as well as local brands. In 2023, New Bond Ltd said it had not made any final plans for Tai Pak after acquiring it in January and that a former business partner had spoken to the press about proposals that had not been approved by other shareholders. Due to the ongoing litigation that also involves the Jumbo Floating Restaurant, renovation of Tai Pak has been postponed. Tai Pak had its lighting restored in late 2024 and plans to re-open in 2026.

=== Jumbo Floating Restaurant ===
Wong ordered the construction of a second restaurant, the Jumbo Floating Restaurant, by the Kowloon Chung Hwa shipyard, at the price of HK$14 million. It was similarly decorated in the style of an imperial palace. On 30 October 1971, a four-alarm fire occurred at the restaurant before its opening which left 34 dead and 42 injured. It had to be rebuilt after new owners Stanley Ho and Cheng Yu-ting bought the title to the remaining assets in July 1972. After total expenditure of HK$30 million, the restaurant began operation in 1976.

During the 1980s and 90s, a period of great prosperity in Hong Kong, the restaurant was often one of the destinations for investors and foreign tourists. Every night, large numbers of diners feasted on such cuisine as crabs, lobster, and roasted suckling pig. Even though most locals knew that the best food was not served there, its exotic oriental atmosphere helped it become a symbol that is somewhat but not entirely unique about Hong Kong.

In the finale of the 1996 comedy film The God of Cookery, Stephen Chow judged a cooking competition that caught the attention of audiences all over China; it was held inside the restaurant.

The restaurant intermittently suspended operations after the 1997 Asian financial crisis. It went through a multimillion-dollar renovation in 2003, emerging as a structure 76 m (249 ft) in length, 4,200 m^{2} (45,000 sq ft) in area and boasting a seating capacity of 2,300 diners, along with a dragon throne, aquarium and a six-storey pagoda.

On 1 March 2020, the restaurant announced it would be closed until further notice and laid off all staff due to the COVID-19 pandemic.

According to the November 2020 Hong Kong policy address, the operator of the Jumbo Floating Restaurant agreed to donate the vessel to Ocean Park Hong Kong as part of the Invigorating Island South project. On 12 March 2021, it was reported that the plan to reactivate the restaurant had been shelved. Other proposals to preserve it, such as relocating onto land or converting to a Bruce Lee museum, were all met with objections. The Hong Kong Jockey Club did not comment following a suggestion for it to take in the vessel. The Antiquities Advisory Board stated that because ships are not covered under the Antiquities and Monuments Ordinance, they cannot be evaluated for conservation. In March 2022, it was reported that the Ocean Park had refused to take in Jumbo. The government would not invest taxpayer money or offer subsidies either, saying it is "not good at running such premises", drawing criticism from opposition lawmakers. Jumbo's parent company Aberdeen Restaurant Enterprises had been operating at a loss with the pandemic devastating tourism and catering industries, while fees for inspections, repairs, licensing and berthing still needed to be paid. Parties approached by the company all cited high maintenance costs as a reason to turn down its offer to donate the restaurant.

==== 2022 capsizing ====
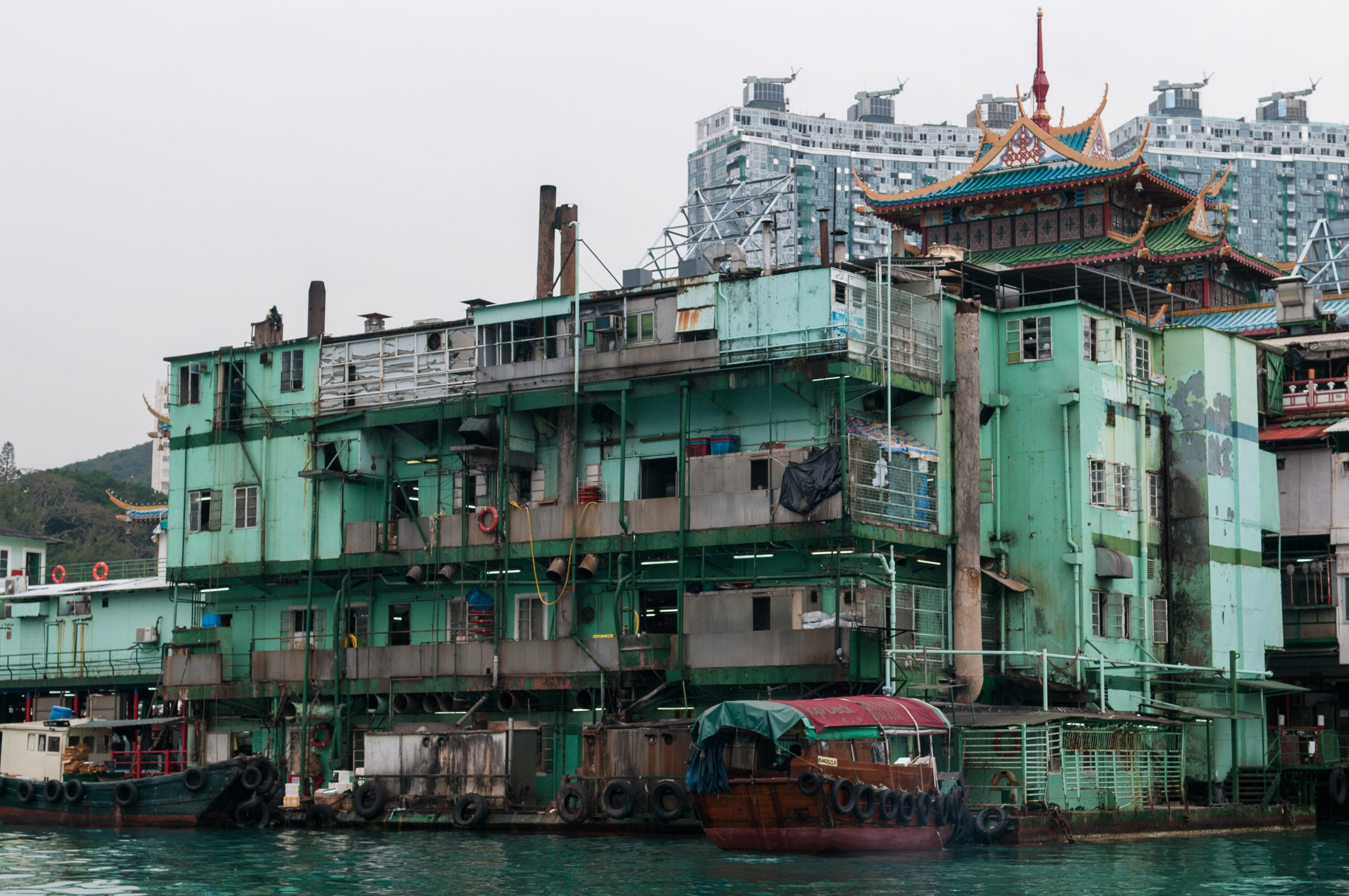
Back of Jumbo Kingdom, kitchen block, in 2012

According to Aberdeen Restaurant Enterprises (ARE), the Jumbo Floating Restaurant had been unprofitable since 2013 and had accumulated losses exceeding HK$100 million as of 2022. On 30 May 2022, the company announced that the restaurant would leave Hong Kong in June 2022. ARE's offers to donate it were not successful as all interested parties cited high operating costs, which can run up to millions of Hong Kong dollars annually. Because its operating licence with the Marine Department was due to expire, and there was no berth available, ARE decided to have the restaurant towed out of Hong Kong and wait for better prospects. At roughly 11pm on 31 May, the kitchen boat of the restaurant began listing following a hull breach. It happened as preparations were being made to tow the restaurant. The restaurant barge was eventually towed out of Hong Kong on 14 June, though the kitchen boat and Tai Pak were left behind. Its destination was Cambodia according to the Marine Department, but this has not been confirmed by ARE. The company said that before the tow, the restaurant was inspected, hoardings were installed, and all relevant approvals were obtained.

On 18 June 2022, while being towed in the South China Sea, the restaurant experienced bad weather and began listing. Despite rescue efforts, it fully capsized the next day near the Paracel Islands in waters over 1,000 m (3,300 ft) deep. Amidst speculations that the boat had sunk, the Hong Kong Marine Department requested a report from ARE, which issued a statement saying that the tug and restaurant were still in the waters and that it had always used the term "capsized", not "sunk". In August, the Maritime Safety Administration of Hainan said the boat had keeled over and was trapped on a reef near Sansha. In March 2023, Oriental Daily News reported that there was plan to lift Jumbo's kitchen boat. It had partially sunk in the Aberdeen Typhoon Shelters shortly before the main restaurant barge was towed away.

Tourism lawmaker Perry Yiu Pak-leung said the loss was of the city's heritage, adding that the "government, conservationists, historians and the commercial sector should be working together to protect" historic sites but everyone had "stalled too long." Other lawmakers in Hong Kong requested an investigation of the South Korean tug boat company to determine whether there was human error or malpractice involved. The company, which employed a South Korean crew, has denied allegations of foul play. In 2021, the same tugboat, Jaewon 9, was involved in an incident where the vessel that it was towing sank after the towing line broke. Commentators from the fishing and shipbuilding industries said that a safer method would have been using a semi-submersible ship, like the ones that transported Sea Palace to Manila Bay and Tsingtao. The market availability of such vessels is low, however, and the price for their service can be prohibitive. The chairman of Yun Lee Marine Group said he does not know of any owners of semi-submersibles in Hong Kong. Some pointed out that the restaurant is top heavy due to its multi-story superstructure and that towing it outside to the high seas should have called for extra precautions. Others argued that as long as the boat itself can be proven as seaworthy, the specific method of transport is secondary.

A digital, three-dimensional model of Jumbo has been created by a student, Shiu Ka-heng. He fed photographs of the boat's exterior into a computer program that transformed them into models viewable using virtual reality goggles. Shiu hopes to archive pieces of Hong Kong history, such as the State Theatre that is undergoing revamp, and said that anyone can use his online platform to turn images into virtual models.

=== Sea Palace ===
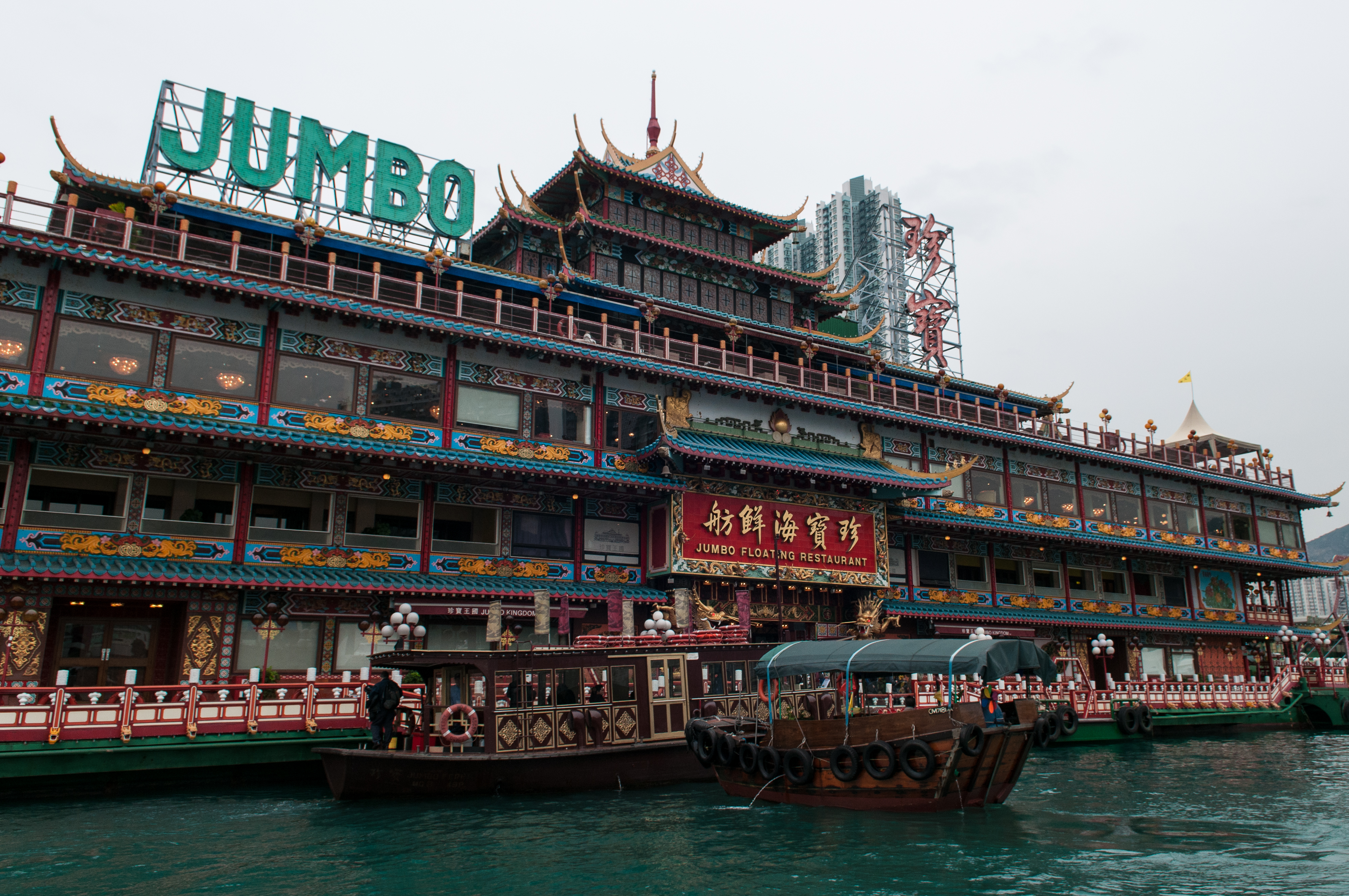
Front of Jumbo Kingdom in 2012

In 1991, Sea Palace was renamed "Jumbo Palace". Shortly after the 1997 Asian financial crisis, it was sold for US$8 million and towed to Manila Bay. Rebranded as "Jumbo Kingdom Manila", much of the original ancient Chinese imperial palace style renovation was retained. The highest level was turned into a large dance floor, and a resident band was hired. It closed down in 2008. The boat was donated to the government of Shantung province in 2011 and towed to Tsingtao as part of an upcoming seaside park. It was intended to undergo reconstruction, including an underwater structure that prevents up and down movements in water, and reopen in May 2014 catering primarily to wedding events, but renovations were still incomplete as of 2021. Local residents have attempted to tour the closed boat on their own, despite the rusting hull and a safety perimeter put in place to deter visitors. A member of the city's SASAC said that because of how complex the structure of the boat is and the absence of some supporting facilities, the operator has not been able to reopen the restaurant.

== Attractions ==
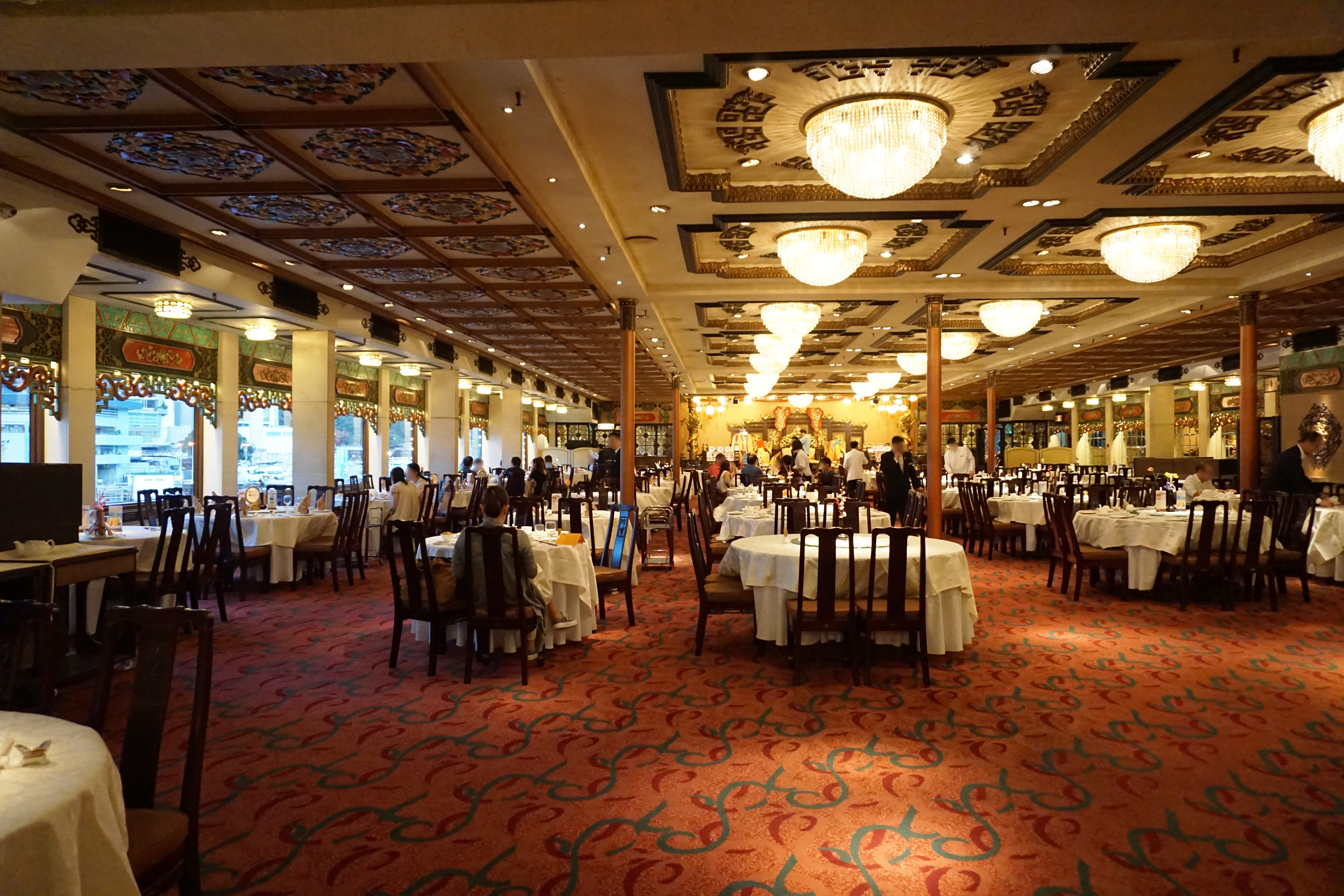
Dragon Court restaurant

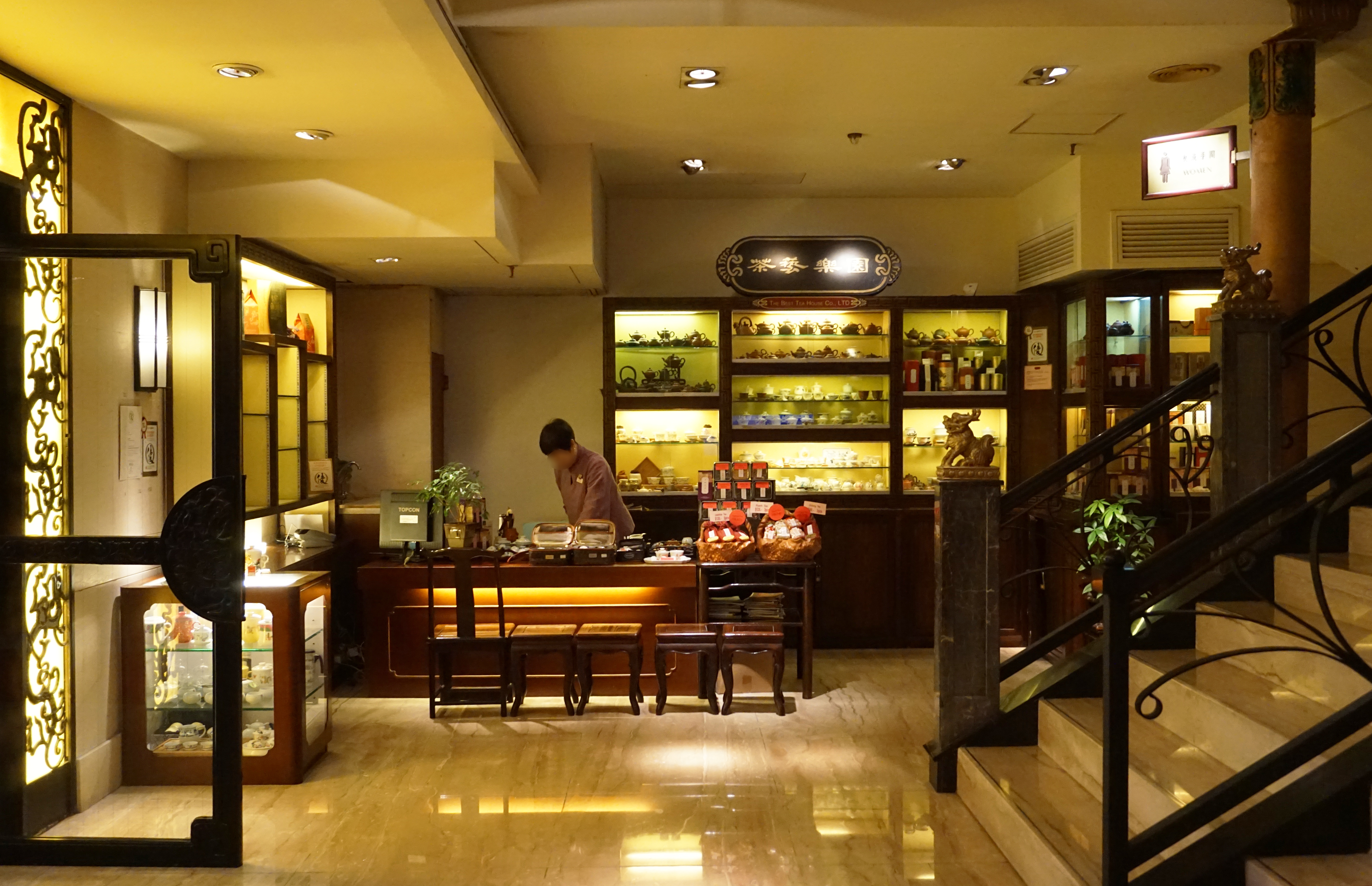
Tea shop at ground floor

- Roof Deck: An alfresco banquet hall located on the top deck of Jumbo serving fine Western food.
- Dragon Court: Dragon Court was a fine dining Chinese restaurant located on the first deck of Jumbo. The interior design of the restaurant was a mixture of Ming Dynasty and contemporary Chinese.
- Shum Wan Pier Garden: Outdoor venue for wedding and cocktail receptions.

A staff canteen was located on the fourth floor of Jumbo Kingdom, named So-Kee Coffee Shop (蘇記茶檔), that served Hong Kong cuisine including noodles and street food. The boat also housed a cooking academy and facilities for conference and banqueting.

The restaurants were accessible via a free shuttle boat from Aberdeen Promenade or Sham Wan pier.

== In popular culture ==
- The Jumbo Floating Restaurant appeared in the James Bond film The Man with the Golden Gun (1974), Jackie Chan's The Protector (1985), in Giant Robo: The Day the Earth Stood Still (1992), The God of Cookery (1996), Godzilla vs Destroyah, Infernal Affairs II, Emanuelle Around the World (1977) and Contagion (2011). It also featured prominently in the television miniseries To Be the Best (1991).
- The Tai Pak Floating Restaurant was featured in Love Is a Many-Splendored Thing (1955), Enter the Dragon (1973), The God of Cookery (1996), and Contagion (2011).
- Jumbo Kingdom appeared in the video games Fatal Fury 2, Fatal Fury Special and Sleeping Dogs, in various episodes of The Amazing Race and its international spinoffs, and in the music video for "All in One" by the boy band Mirror.
- The American miniseries Noble House depicts the compound being destroyed by a fire.

== Lawsuit ==
In November 2022, King Field Shipyard sued Aberdeen Restaurant Enterprises (ARE), the owners of Tai Pak and Jumbo, for the return of the three restaurant barges and unpaid fees totaling HK$4.8 million. In its court filing, the shipyard said that on 19 May, it signed an agreement with ARE to buy the barges for HK$4 in exchange for HK$5.4 million in unpaid fees associated with transfer of ownership and business licenses. ARE put down a HK$600,000 deposit on 20 May and, according to the shipyard, HK$1 was paid for the Jumbo barge on 25 May. On 1 June, ARE informed the shipyard that the Jumbo barge, still parked inside the Aberdeen shelter, had submerged. It was towed away from the harbor on 14 June and capsized five days later at sea. On 27 July, ARE wrote to the shipyard saying that their agreement had automatically terminated on account of the 1 June incident. King Field Shipyard accused ARE of failing to maintain Jumbo safely under the terms that they had agreed upon, as well as failing to deliver the other barges.

In April 2024, documents from the lawsuit revealed that King Field was suing not only ARE but also Tai Pak's new owner over four vessels in total—Tai Pak, its kitchen barge, its fire suppression barge, as well as Jumbo's kitchen barge. Whether the transfer of the vessels' ownership was actually completed was also in dispute. Salvage operations began on the kitchen barges of Jumbo and Tai Pak in 2023, but the court ordered all four vessels to be preserved until the case closes.

== Gallery ==
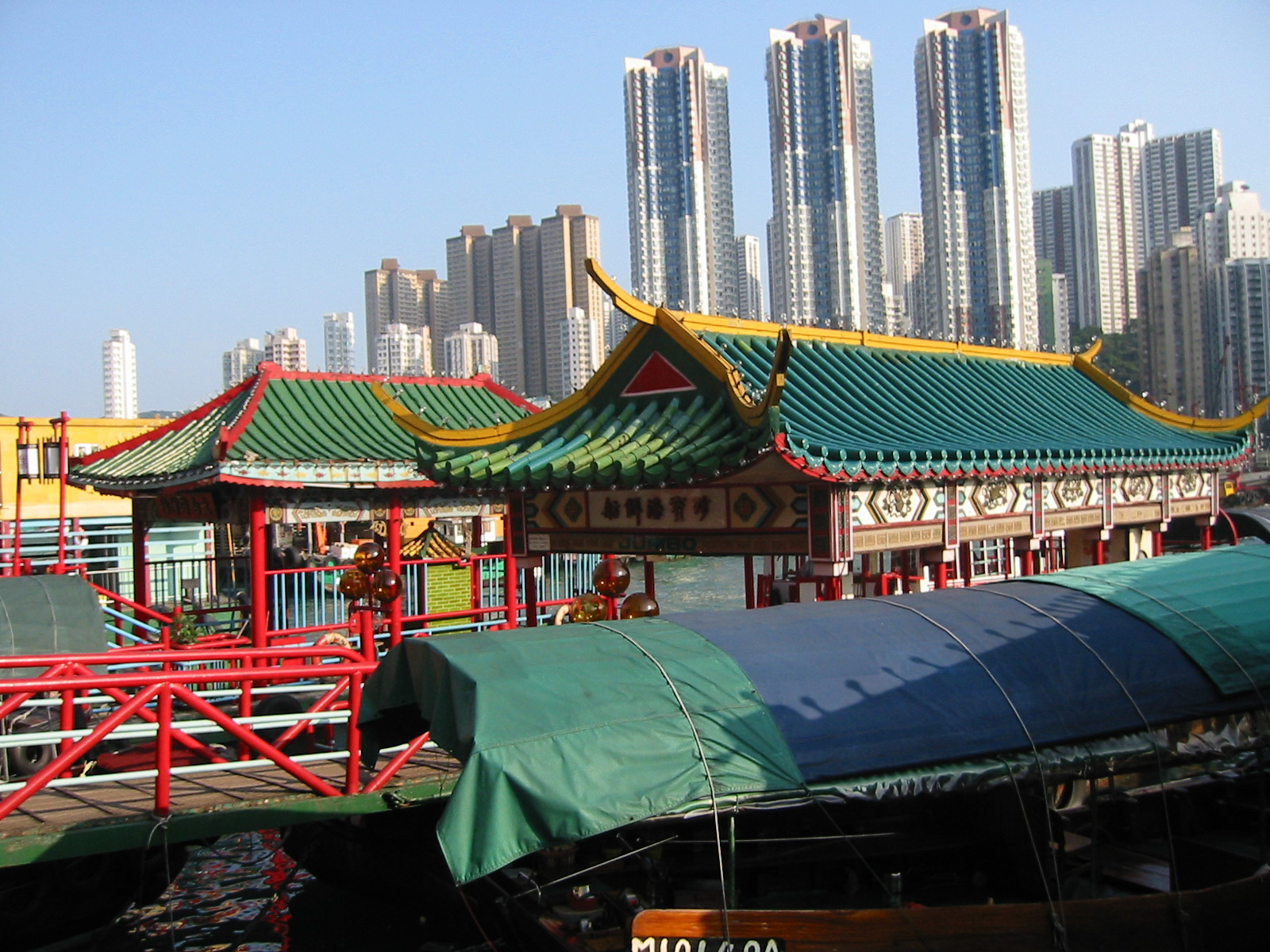
Jumbo Kingdom pier along Aberdeen Promenade

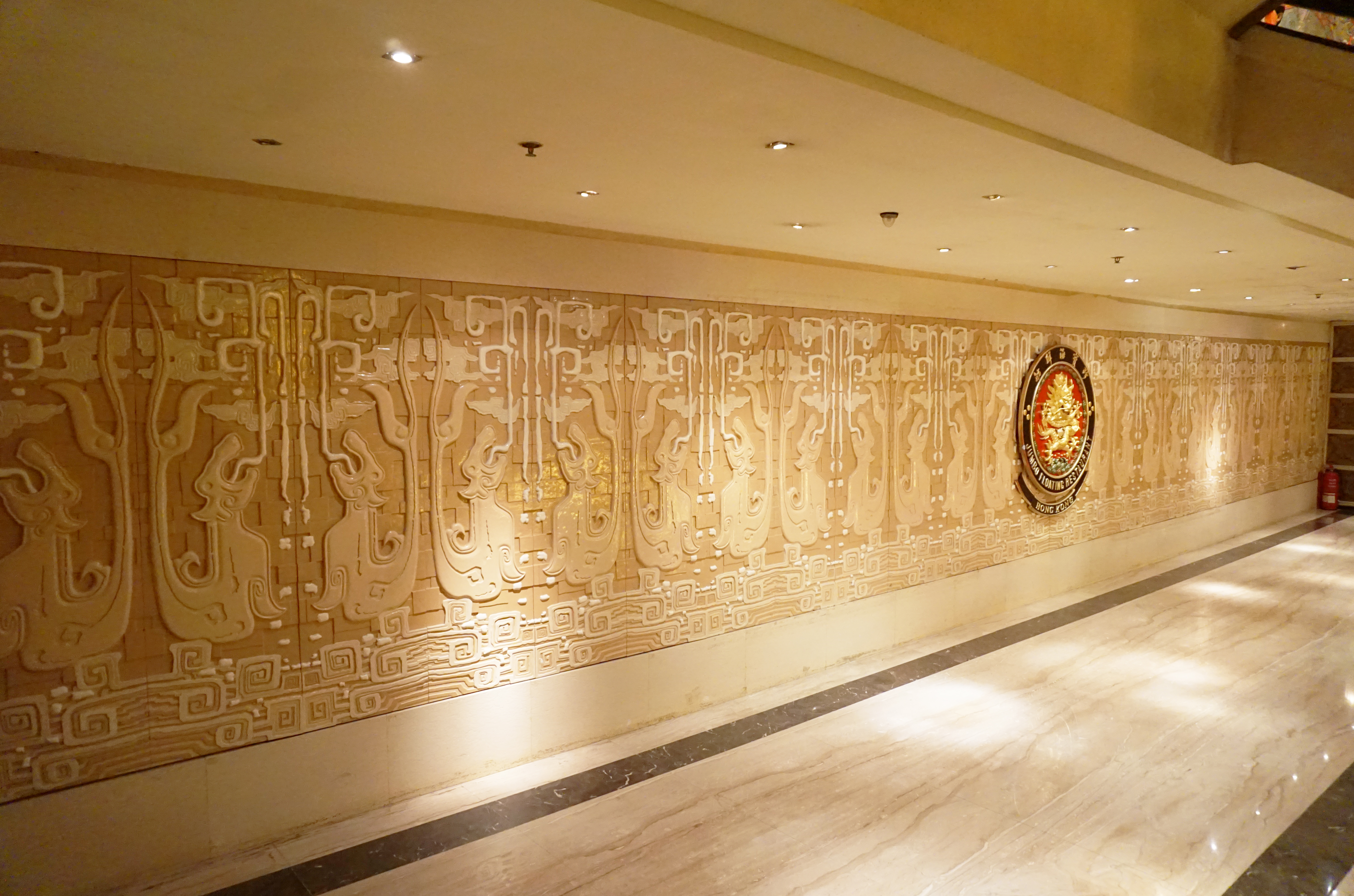
1st Floor Relief and Badge

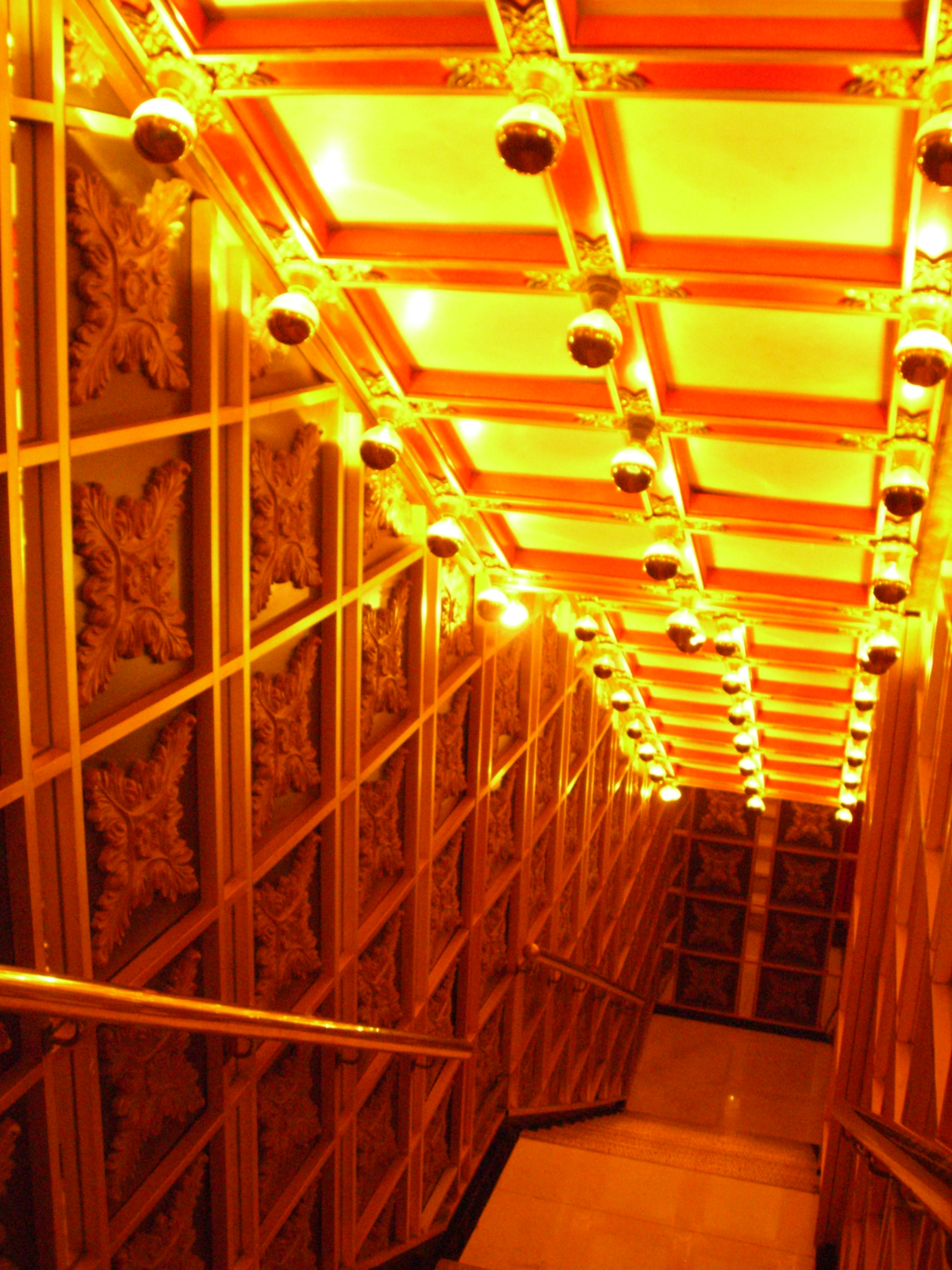
Staircase leading up to top deck

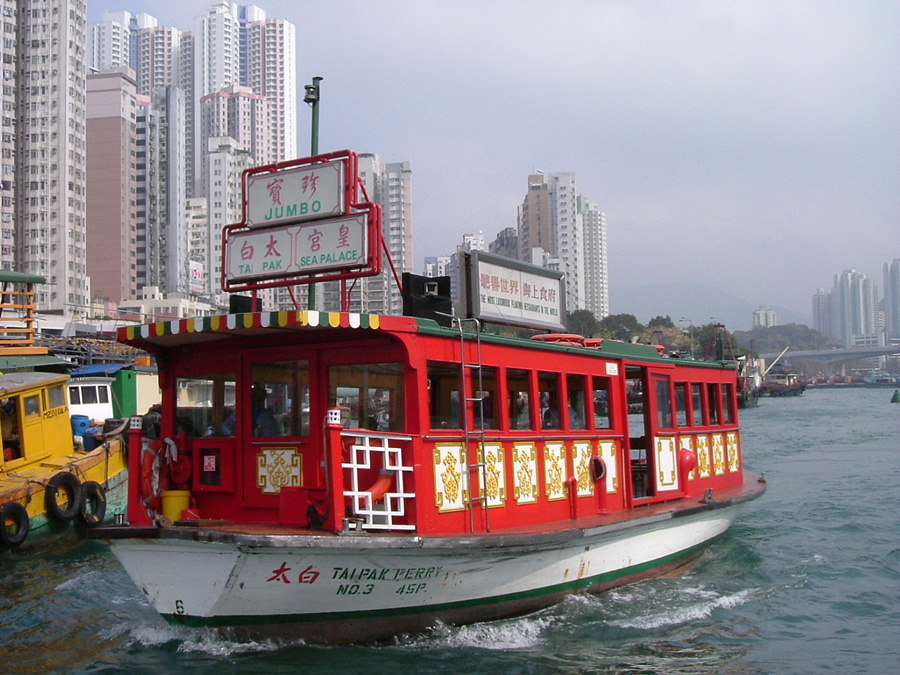
Transport boat to restaurant

== Sister boats ==
Floating restaurants with similar designs include the ClubONE Riviera on the Shing Mun River in Sha Tin and another Sea Palace in Amsterdam, Netherlands.

== See also ==
- Floating restaurant
- List of restaurants in China
