= 99 cents =

99 cents or 99¢ may refer to:

== Music ==
- 99 Cents (Chicks on Speed album), and the title song, 2003
- 99¢ (Santigold album), 2016

== Visual arts ==
- 99 Cent (photograph), a 1999 color photograph by Andreas Gursky
- 99 Cent II Diptychon, a 2001 color photography by Andreas Gursky

== Other uses ==
- Psychological pricing, a theory that certain prices have a psychological impact
- 99 cent store, or variety store
- 99 Cents Only Store, an American price-point retailer

== See also ==
- 99% (disambiguation)
- 99p (disambiguation)
- 0.99 (disambiguation)
