= 1 Club =

1 Club, one of clubs, First Club, one-percent club, Number 1 Club, may refer to:

== Groups, organizations, companies ==
- The One Club, a U.S. nonprofit for recognizing and promoting excellence in advertising
- 1%Club. an online non-profit for funding development of ideas from developing countries

== Sports and games ==
- The number 1 golf club:
  - 1 wood, the driver
  - 1 iron, the driver
- One Club Award, a Spanish soccer award
- 1 of clubs, a playing card in the clubs card suite

== Television ==
- The 1% Club, a 2022 British quiz game show
  - The 1% Club (Australian game show), a 2023 Australian adaptation of the British show
  - The 1% Club (American game show), a 2024 American adaptation of the British show

== See also ==
- Club One (disambiguation)
- One percent (disambiguation)
- Club (disambiguation)
- First (disambiguation)
- One (disambiguation)
