= Victor och Natten =

- Born: Victor Junior Morsing; 16 June 1988 (age 38); Köping, Sweden
- Genres: Pop; pop rap
- Occupations: Singer; rapper
- Instruments: Vocals

Victor Junior Morsing (born 16 June 1988), better known by his stage name Victor och Natten (English: Victor and the Night) is a Swedish singer.

== Life and career ==
Morsing was born on 16 June 1988 in Köping. His father died when he was very young and he added the name Natten in his artist name as a tribute to him. He released his first music single called "Svartsjuk" in 2014. Morsing writes songs in Swedish and describes his music as "pop music with rap lyrics". He participated in Melodifestivalen 2016, performing the song "100%" in semi-final 2, ending up in sixth place, not progressing to the final.

== Discography ==
=== Singles ===
Title	Year	Peak chart positions	Certifications	Album
Title	Year	SWE	Certifications	Album
"Svartsjuk"	2014	—		Non-album singles
"Svin på rutin"	2014	13	GLF: Gold	Non-album singles
"Normal"	2014	—		Non-album singles
"100%"	2016	79		TBA
"—" denotes a single that did not chart or was not released in that territory.
