= Two percent =

2% can refer to:

- 2% Milk, see fat content of milk
- Lembeek's 2%, a Belgian beer

== See also ==
- One percent (disambiguation)
- 99% (disambiguation)
