= 100% Love =

100% Love may refer to:

- 100% Love (2011 film), a 2011 Telugu-language film
  - 100% Love (soundtrack), soundtrack to the 2011 film
- 100% Love (2012 film), a 2012 Bengali-language film, a remake of the 2007 Telugu film Aadavari Matalaku Arthale Verule
- 100% Kadhal (100% Love), a 2019 Tamil-language romantic-comedy film, a remake of the Telugu film

== See also ==
- 100% (disambiguation)
- 100% Love: Buk Fatey To Mukh Foteyna, 2012 Bangladeshi remake of the 2011 Indian film
- 100% verliebt, English: 100% in Love, 2025 song by Vanessa Mai
