= ClubONE Riviera =

Building in Sha Tin, Hong Kong

Coordinates: 22°23′25″N 114°12′11.5″E

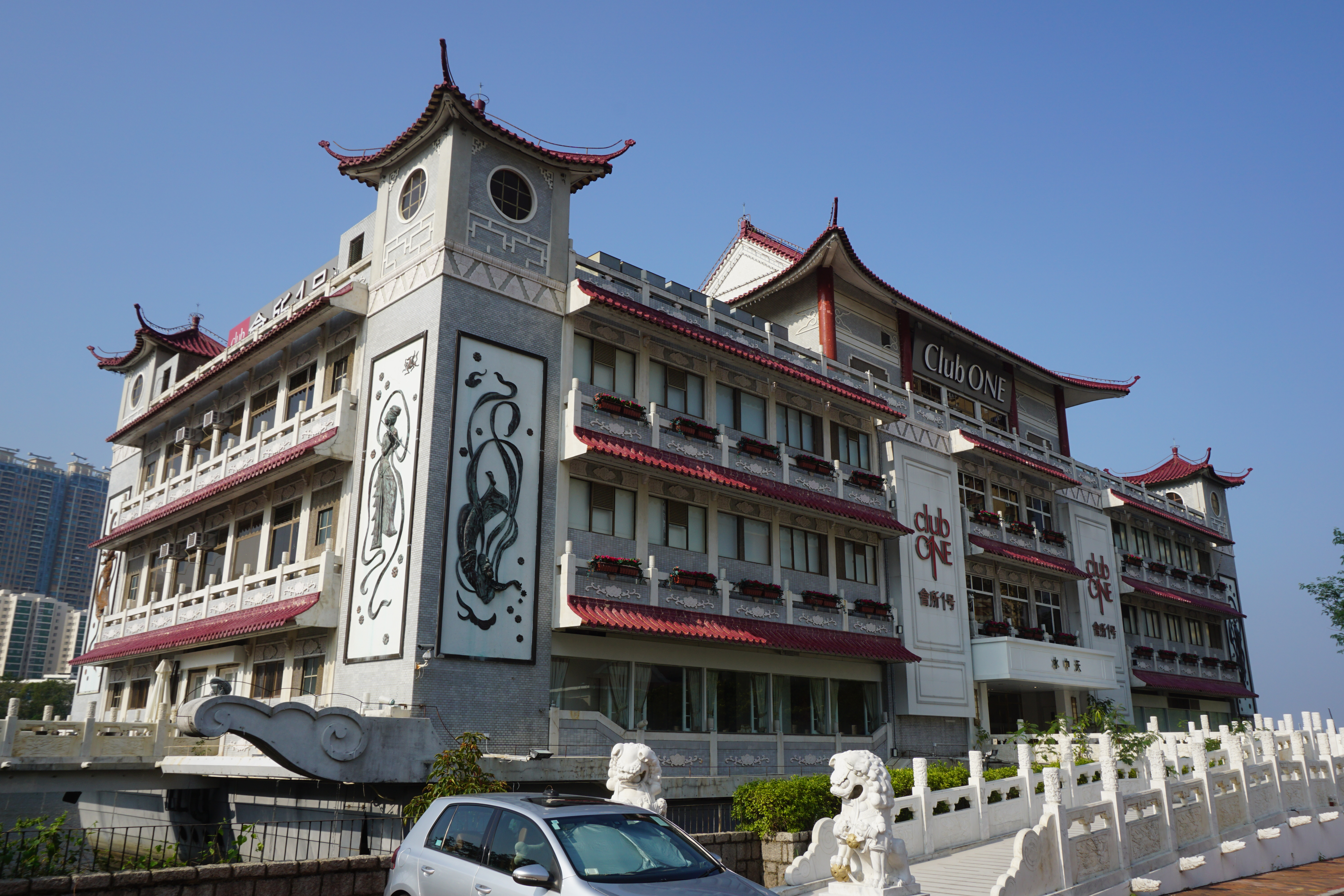
- Interactive map of ClubONE Riviera

Restaurant information
- Established: 1986
- Food type: Cantonese, dim sum, seafood
- Location: Sha Tin, Hong Kong

ClubONE Riviera
- Traditional Chinese: 會所1號 水中天
- Simplified Chinese: 会所1号 水中天
Transcriptions
Standard Mandarin
- Hanyu Pinyin: Huìsuǒ 1 Hào Shuǐ Zhōngtiān
Yue: Cantonese
- Jyutping: wui6 so2 1 hou6 seoi2 zung1 tin1

Star Seafood Restaurant
- Traditional Chinese: 明星海鮮舫
- Simplified Chinese: 明星海鮮舫
Transcriptions
Standard Mandarin
- Hanyu Pinyin: Míngxīng Hǎixiān Fǎng
Yue: Cantonese
- Jyutping: ming^{4} sing^{1} hoi^{2} sin^{1} fong^{2}

Treasure Floating Restaurant
- Traditional Chinese: 敦煌畫舫
- Simplified Chinese: 敦煌画舫
Transcriptions
Standard Mandarin
- Hanyu Pinyin: Dūnhuáng Huàfǎng
Yue: Cantonese
- Jyutping: deon1 wong4 waa6 fong2

ClubONE Riviera (Chinese: 會所1號 水中天), formerly called Star Seafood Restaurant (明星海鮮舫), and earlier called Treasure Floating Restaurant (敦煌畫舫), is a restaurant in Sha Tin, Hong Kong. The restaurant was built with granite taking on the shape of a ship berthing along the shore. The building is situated at the eastern shore of Shing Mun River, near the junction of Siu Lek Yuen Road and Tai Chung Kiu Road. It served Cantonese dim sum and seafood.

As of 2007, the restaurant was the largest dim sum restaurant in Hong Kong, with 150 tables seating 12 people each.

The restaurant closed in early 2018 and reopened as 'Club One' in summer 2018.

== History ==
The current building was a replacement for the former Shatin Floating Restaurant that had opened in 1963 and which was later towed to Guangzhou in 1984. The relocation was mandated by the relevant government departments for several reasons. Firstly, the land that the restaurant used as a car park was allocated to the Amateur Rowing Association. Secondly, the pollution discharged by the restaurant clashed with plans to build a town park along the river, in concert with the ongoing development of Sha Tin New Town. Lastly the Shatin Lands Office stated that the construction of an underwater sewage pipe in the Shing Mun River would hamper the large vessel's ability to manoeuvre out of the channel in the future.

In its 21 years in Hong Kong, the first restaurant operated in eight locations, including the area in front of a mansion called Windermere (also called Ho Tung Lau), Sai Lam Temple, Lek Yuen, and the current site of the Sha Tin Jockey Club Swimming Pool.

In 1986 the Lands Department offered the site, near the anchorage of the old floating restaurant, for tender. It was intended from the beginning to resemble a true floating restaurant but sit on piles, as the Shatin Lands Office stated that a restaurant vessel could no longer be operated on the Shing Mun River. The office also stated that the restaurant would not pollute the river as it would have a proper sewer connection.

The restaurant, lit up at night and reflected in the still water of the Shing Mun River, has long been a local landmark of Shatin. A 1992 review in the South China Morning Post described it as "a hulking concrete pile that sits firmly in Sha Tin's river like a barge designed by Hollywood showmen Louis B. Mayer and Sam Goldwyn on a drunken dare [...] so electrically dazzling its sheer candle power could light the way into Kai Tak. Gaudy beyond belief, the main dining rooms' crystal chandeliers are worthy of Versailles, and the stone sculptures and pagoda towers could easily sink an ocean liner."

== Gallery ==
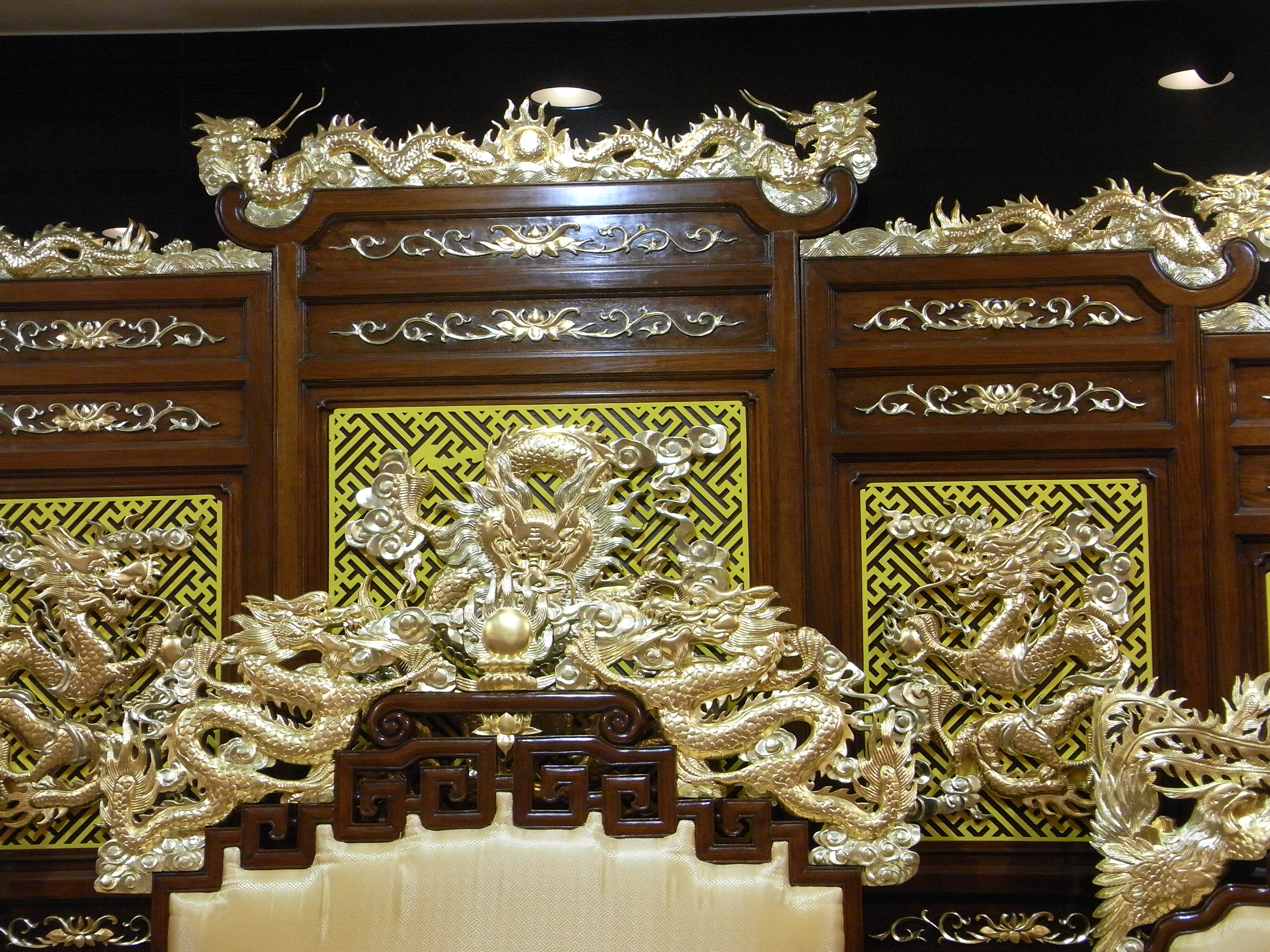
A set of Chinese dragon chairs at the restaurant

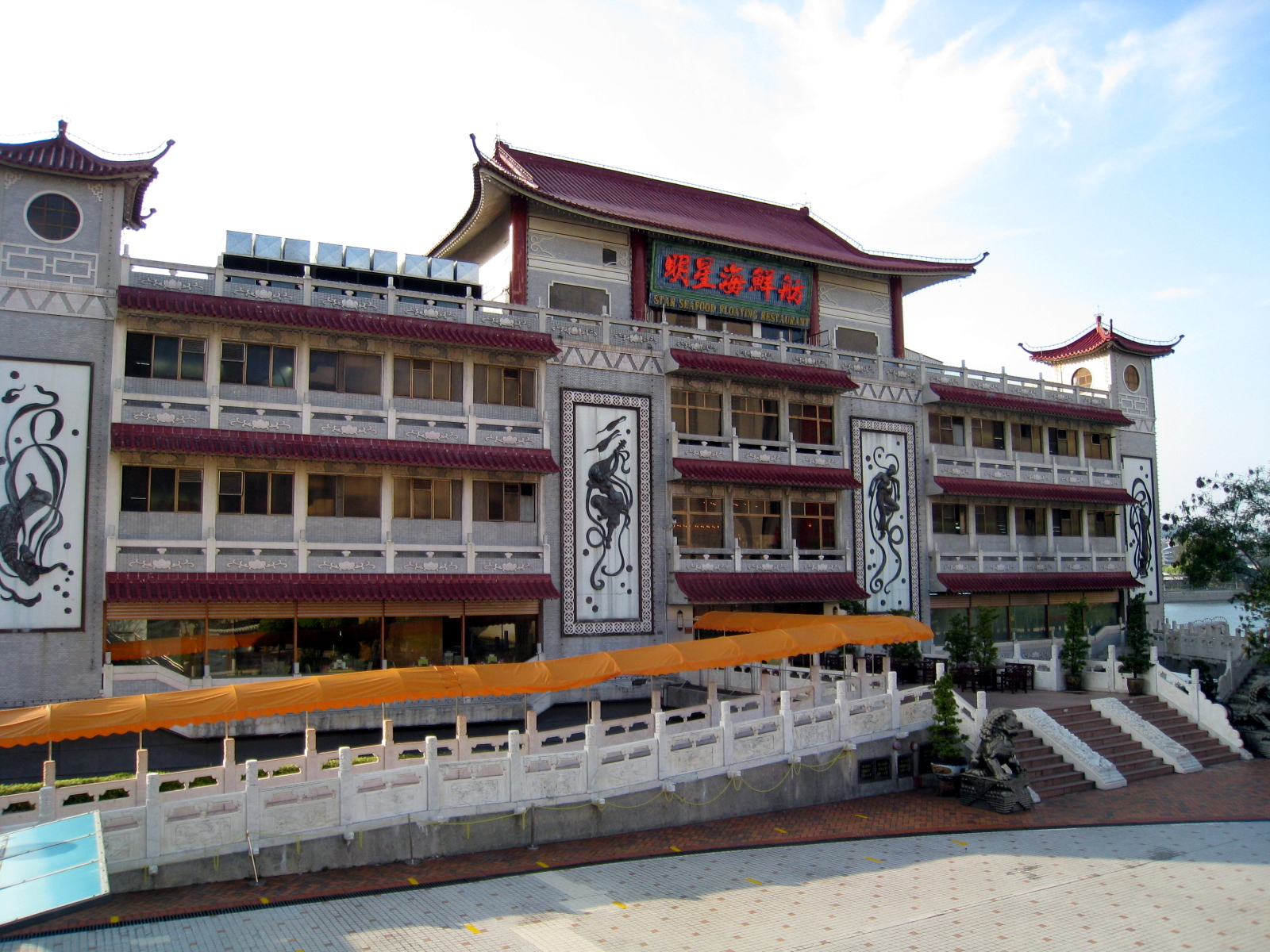
Full view

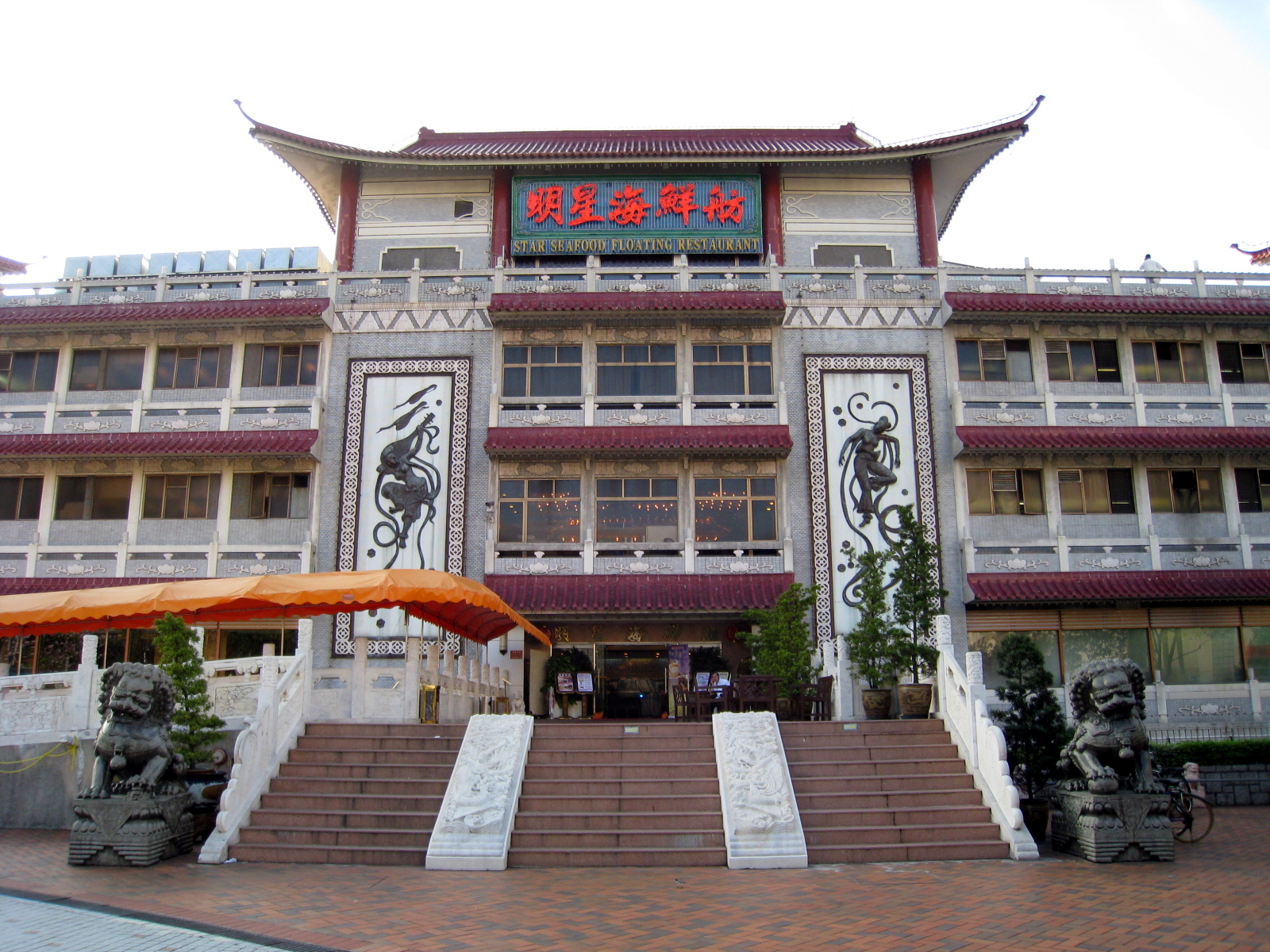
Lion entrance

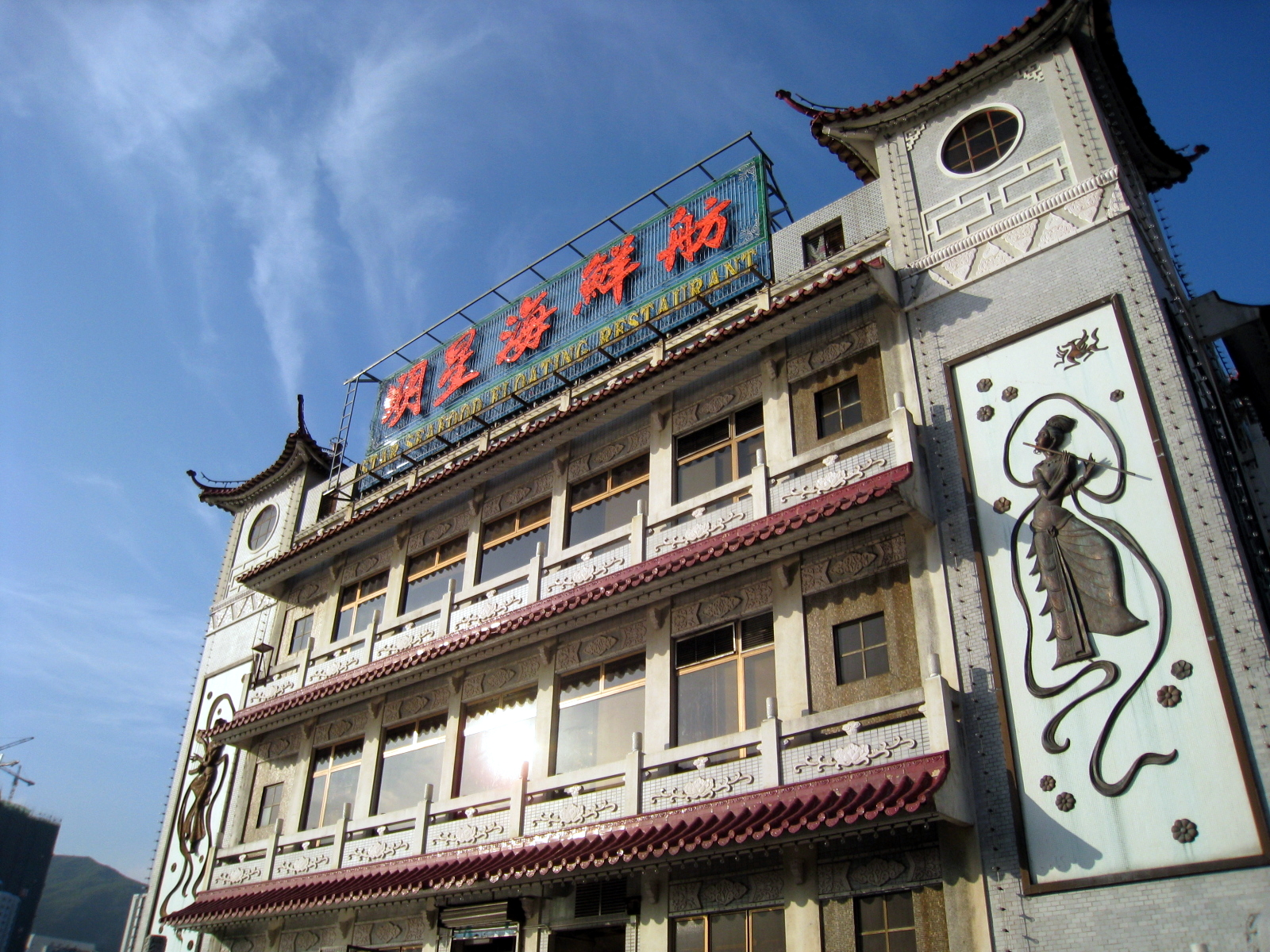
Decorations

== See also ==
- Jumbo Floating Restaurant
- List of Chinese restaurants
- List of seafood restaurants
- List of restaurants in China
