= Club One Air =

Jet aircraft charter company in India

- Commenced operations: August 2005; 21 years ago
- Operating bases: Delhi, Mumbai and Visakhapatnam
- Fleet size: 8
- Website: www.cluboneair.com

Club One Air is an air charter company operating in India. It has bases in Delhi, Mumbai and Visakhapatnam. The airline started its operations from Delhi in August 2005, and expanded to Mumbai in March 2006.

In February 2024, it was announced that Club One Air had secured a lease on a plot of land at Maharana Pratap Airport, with the intention of building a hangar for storage and maintenance of its five Dassault Falcon 2000 aircraft.

== Fleet ==
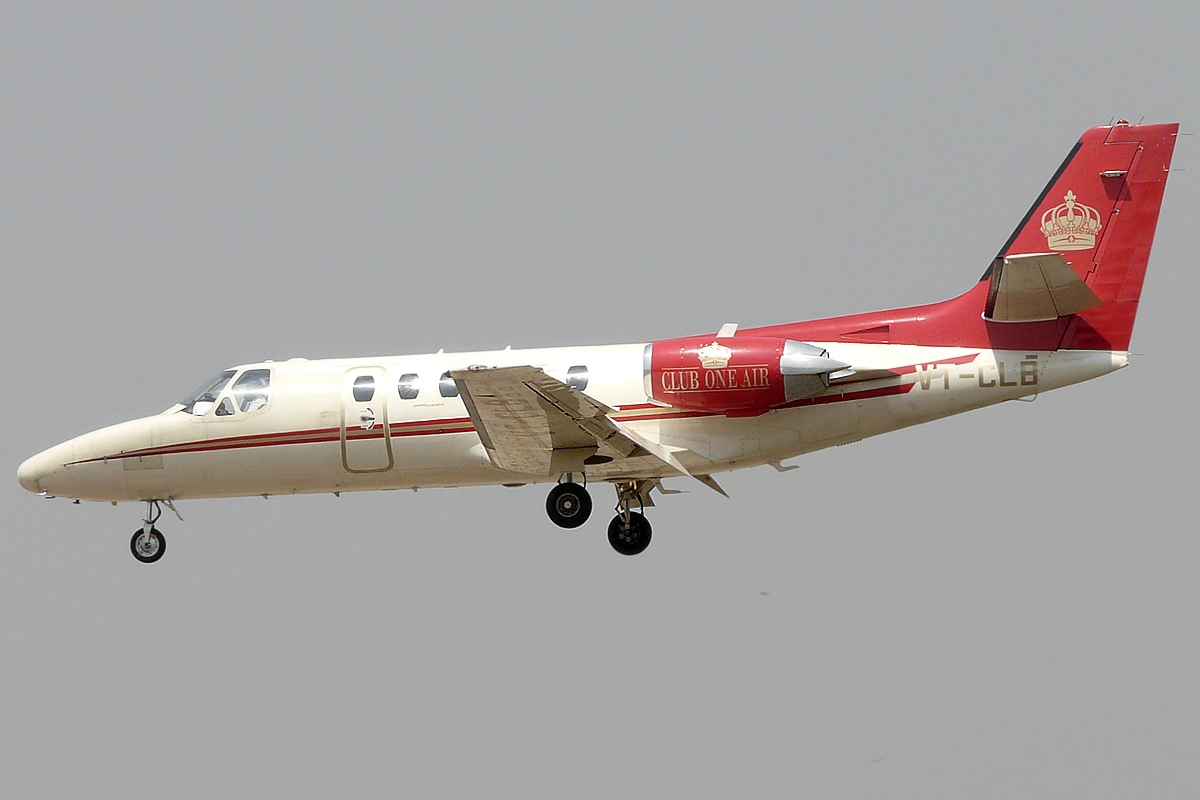
Cessna Citation II

=== Current fleet ===
As of February 2024, Club One Air operates the following aircraft:

Club One Air fleet
| Aircraft | In service | Orders | Passengers | Notes |
|---|---|---|---|---|
| Bombardier CRJ100 | 1 (as of July 2026) | — | | |
| Dassault Falcon 2000 | 5 | — | 8 | |
| Dassault Falcon 2000 | 5 | — | 9 | |
| Dassault Falcon 2000 | 5 | — | 10 | |
| Dassault Falcon 2000 | 5 | — | 12 | |
| Cessna Citation Excel | 2 | — | 8 | |
| Cessna Citation II | 1 | — | 7 | |
| Total | 8 | — | | |

All its aircraft are based in Indira Gandhi International Airport, Delhi.

=== Former fleet ===
As of August 2017, the airline previously operated the following aircraft:

- 1 Bombardier CRJ200
