= 99p =

99p may refer to:

- 99p Stores, a now-defunct British chain store
- Psychological pricing, a theory that certain prices have a psychological impact

== See also ==
- 0.99 (disambiguation)
- 99% (disambiguation)
- Penny (British decimal coin)
- The 99p Challenge, a spoof radio panel game
- 99P/Kowal, a periodic comet in the Solar System
