= 1%Club =

Online non-profit organization

- Founded: 2008; Amsterdam, Netherlands
- Type: Non-governmental organization
- Location: Amsterdam, Netherlands; Nairobi, Kenya
- Website: www.onepercentclub.com www.1procentclub.nl

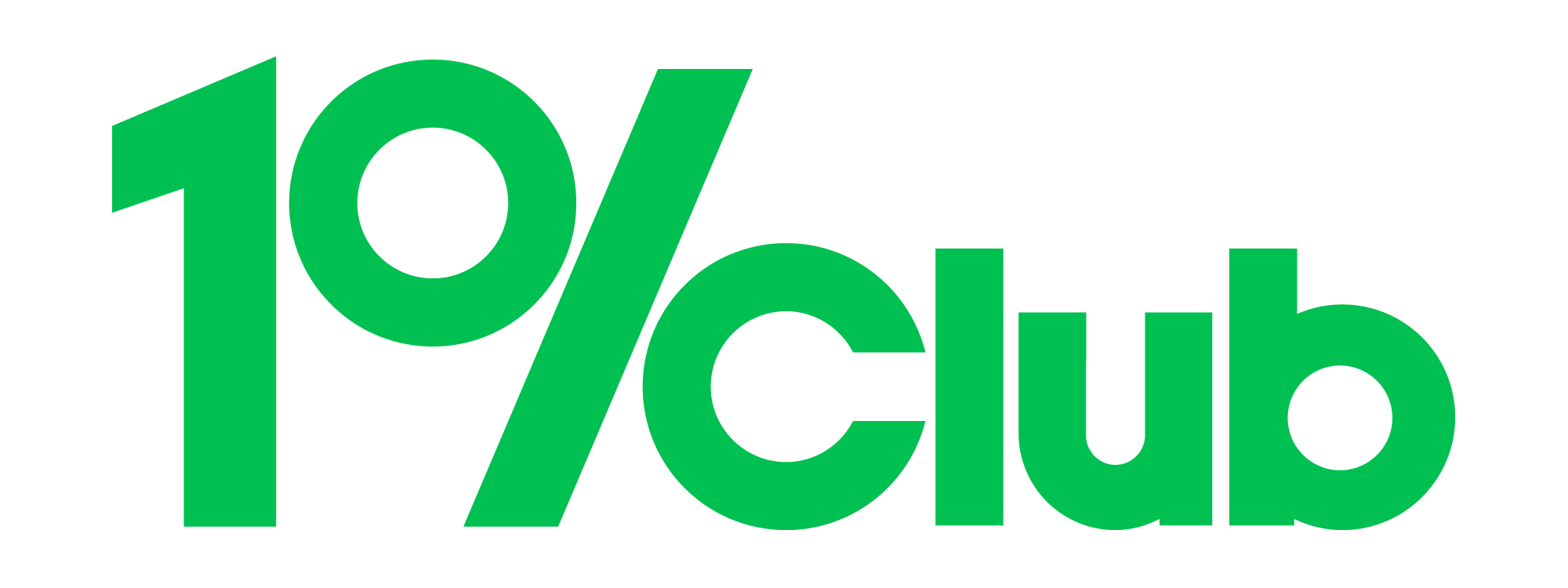
Logo of 1 Percent Club

The 1%Club is a non-profit organization which uses an online platform to connect people with ideas in developing countries with people, money and knowledge around the world. The basic idea is that people or organizations can offer 1% of their time, knowledge and income directly to a development project of their own choice. These projects need to be sustainable projects that stimulate the self-reliance of individuals anywhere in the world and improve their standard of living.

== Founders ==
The 1%Club was founded by Anna Chojnacka and Bart Lacroix who both have backgrounds in development cooperation. Anna Chojnacka began as youth representative on the General Meeting at the United Nations in 2003. She also worked as campaign leader at Fair Trade Original. Besides that Anna is a member of the Worldconnectors think tank, a think tank for international cooperation. Bart Lacroix worked in Tanzania as business and marketing manager at VSO. Furthermore, he was online marketing consultant for Africa Interactive and he worked as project manager for Butterfly Works They both specialized in applying Web 2.0 in order to increase participation, democracy and empowerment of disadvantaged groups worldwide.

== History ==
1%Club was established in 2008. The Dutch website was launched on April 1, 2008. The international website was launched on March 12, 2010. Anna Chojnacka developed the vision that money intended for development could be better spent, especially because internet was developing into a big cooperation system where people who never even met each other were able to create things together, for example Wikipedia! That is why she wondered what could happen if such a system would be used for developmental issues. Bart Lacroix also came up with the idea that people nowadays want to have a personal influence on development cooperation and that they want to see what happens with their money. The Manifesto International Cooperation 2.0 was written. This manifesto states that we live in a world where economic means are very unequally divided. The '1.0' way of dealing with this would hold that authorities come up with a fixed policy for a couple of years to fight poverty. In International Cooperation 2.0 the people have the power. Internet has become available all over the world through which we have become the first generation that has the knowledge and means to collaborate on a global scale. That is why an online marketplace platform was designed where projects can be started and people can personally choose which projects they want to direct their money, time or knowledge to. This website combines social media sites: both the people who created a project as the members introduce themselves in an interactive way and explain why they support certain projects with their gifts or time.

== International co-operation 2.0 ==
'International co-operation 2.0' is characterized by massive collaboration, self organisation, open-source marketing, collective intelligence and crowd sourcing. Anna Chojnacka and Bart Lacroix decided to apply this concept to development co-operation. In essence, the person itself is at the centre and can create his or her own world. The idea behind this is that participants of the marketplace become owners of the process, instead of it being directed from the top, this way trying to solve poverty together. By connecting people's energy, passion, means, experience and knowledge on a world-wide scale, a structure comes into being where worldwide one to one development co-operation is possible. People can come together, publish small pieces of information online, share specific knowledge, ask specific questions and offer concrete expertise and solutions.

== Organizational structure ==
Recommendation Committee are former minister-president Ruud Lubbers, rabbi Awraham Soetendorp, lawyer and professor Tineke Lambooy and lawyer Naema Tahir. At the moment 6 people work at the 1%Club offices in Amsterdam and Nairobi (Kenya). They are supported by volunteers, interns and partners (e.g. Accenture).

== Financing ==
The 1%Club calculates a service fee of 1% per donation from individuals and 5% from businesses. Sponsors and grants further cover 1%Club's own costs. The 1%Club has developed the first version of the website with a start-up grant from NCDO. For 2009 and 2010 the 1%Club received a grant from the Dutch Ministry of Foreign Affairs in the category ‘young and renewing'. The 1%Club receives MFSII from 2011 till 2016. Therefore the 1%Club has joined the IMPACT alliance (‘Innovative Mitigation of Poverty Actions’). Also Oxfam Novib, Butterfly Works, Somo, Hirda and Fairfood joined this alliance.

== Projects ==
Within the 1%Club individual responsibility and trust are of importance. Members have their own profile page and can choose which projects they want to support. All people can see where the projects stand for, where the money, knowledge or time goes to and what the progress is. It can be monitored what went well and what went wrong. Ultimately it can be seen whether or not the project is completed. The people who run the projects are responsible for the outcome of the project and they have to demonstrate who they are, what they do and why they are doing it. All knowledge and information about the projects have to be available directly for everyone. A few of the conditions to become a 1%Club project are:

- The initiators of the project need to be living in a developing country (which is stated on the DAC list);
- The projects need to be small, concrete and limited in time and resources;
- The projects can receive a maximum contribution of €5.000 from the 1%Club;
- The project owner needs to have internet so regular updates can be given;
