= Sham Wan (Southern District) =

Bay in the Southern District of Hong Kong

Coordinates: 22.24341°N 114.16139°E

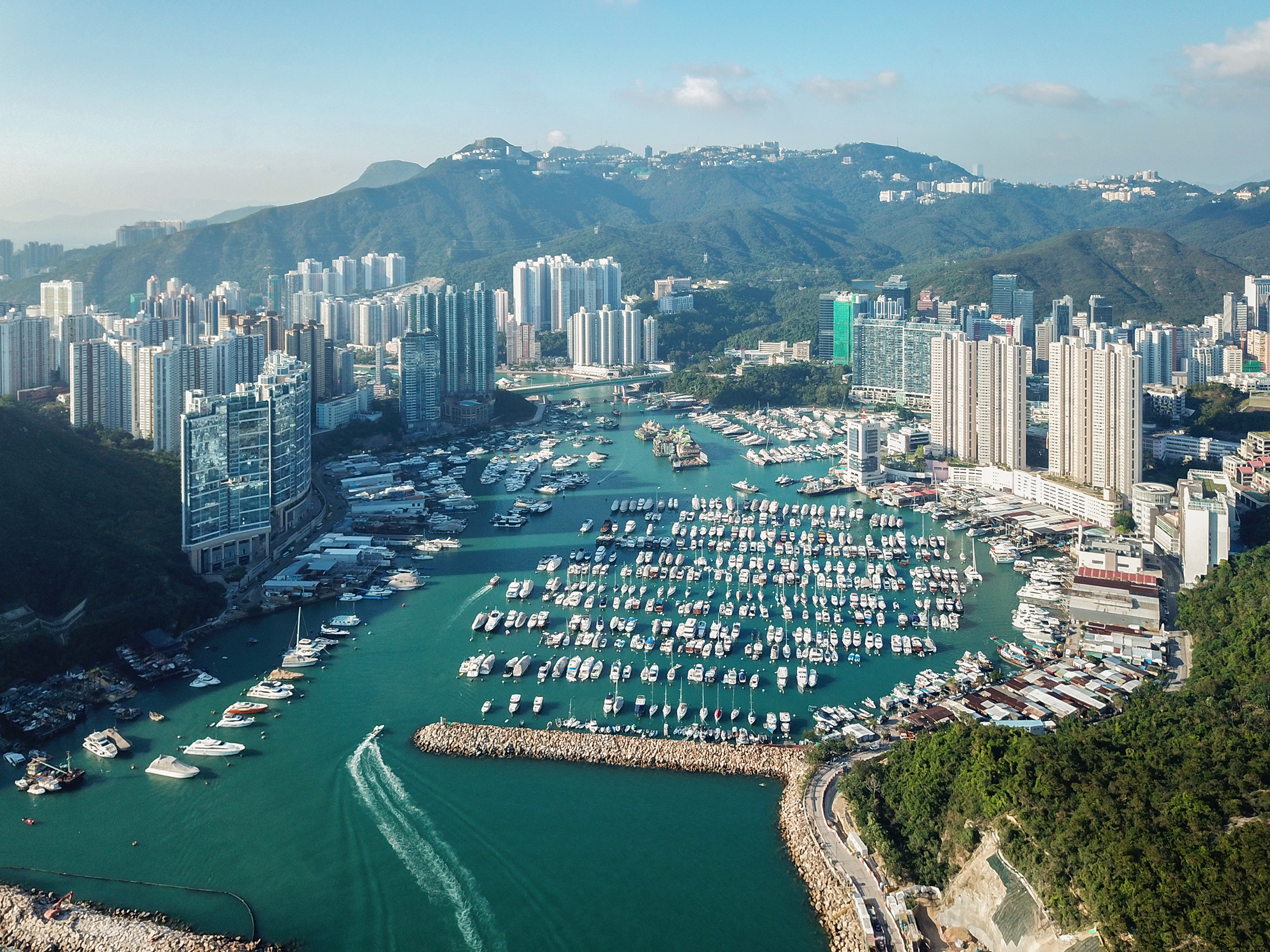
Aerial view of Sham Wan.

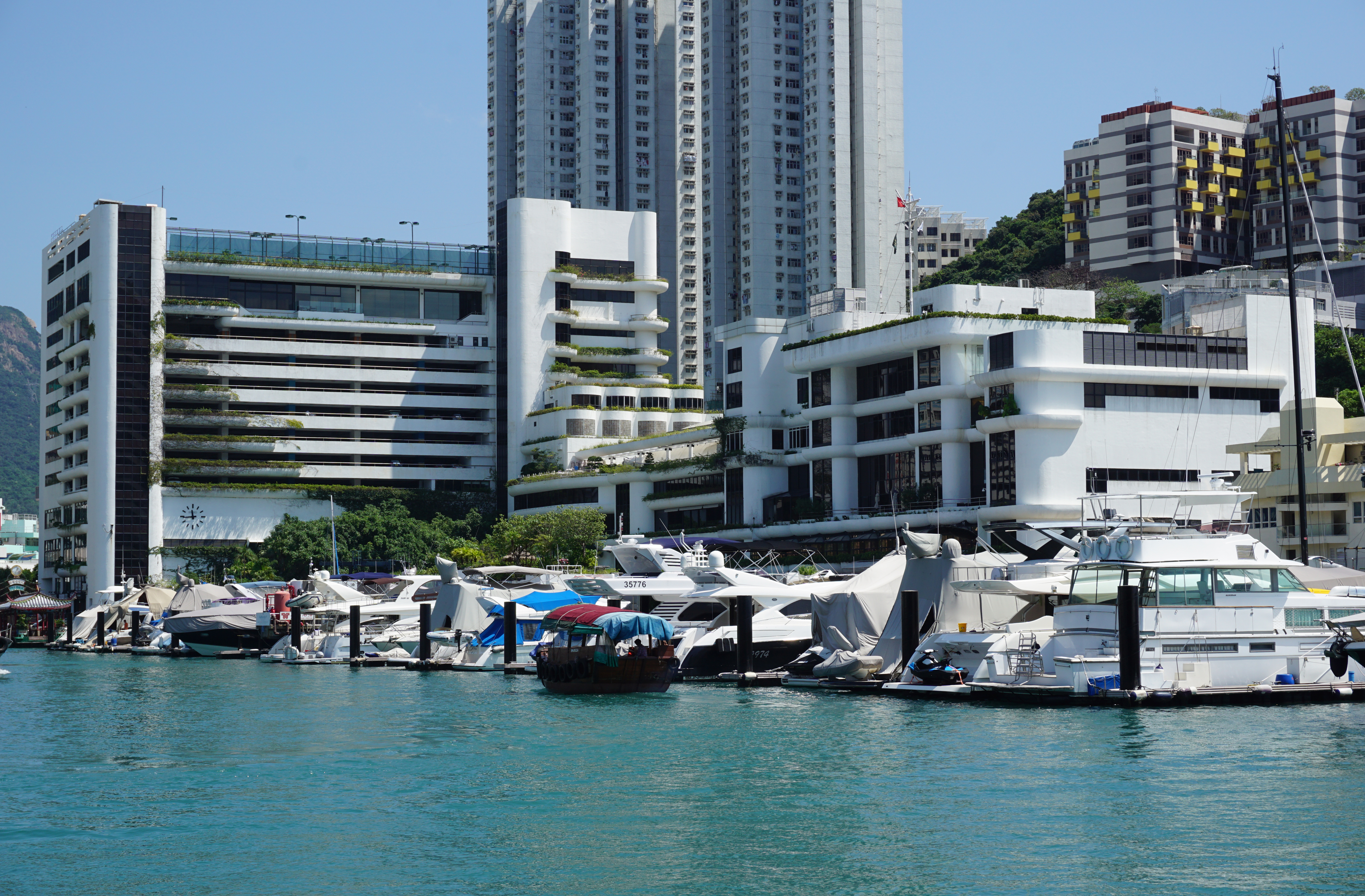
Aberdeen Marina Club at Sham Wan.

Sham Wan (Chinese: 深灣; lit. 'deep bay'), sometimes transliterated as Shum Wan, is a bay in the Southern District of Hong Kong. It is located within the Aberdeen South Typhoon Shelter.

== Features ==
The Aberdeen Marina Club and the Aberdeen Boat Club have clubhouses and mooring facilities at Sham Wan.

== See also ==
- Sham Wan Towers
