= One percent =

One percent (or 1%) or One percenter may refer to:

== Groups of people ==
- The wealthiest 1% of people in the United States, from the Occupy Movement's slogan, "We are the 99%"
- One percenter (motorcycle), a member of an outlaw motorcycle club derived from the statement "99% of motorcyclists are law-abiding citizens"

== Film and television ==
- 1% (film), a 2017 Australian film
- "1%" (South Park), an episode of South Park
- The One Percent (film), a 2006 documentary about the growing wealth gap in the United States
- The 1% Club, a 2022 British quiz game show

== Songs ==
- "1%" (song), by Tomomi Itano, 2013
- "1%", by Funeral for a Friend from Chapter and Verse, 2015
- "1%", by Jane's Addiction from Jane's Addiction, 1987
- "1%", by Kiiara, 2018
- "1%", by Oscar Scheller featuring Lily Allen, 2019
- "One Percent", by Gorillaz from The Now Now, 2018
- "One Percent", by Rich White Ladies, 2012

== Other uses ==
- 1% rule (Internet culture), a rule of thumb pertaining to participation in an internet community
- 1% rule (aviation medicine), a risk threshold for medical incapacitation
- 1% milk, a grade of milk containing 1% butterfat
- One percenter (Australian rules football), various small actions in the game that help the team win
- The One Percent Doctrine, a nonfiction book by Ron Suskind
- One Percent for the Planet, a globally recognized certification that represents thousands of businesses & environmental partners
- 1 Percent, the first site to ever sell "lifestyle accessories". Online since 1995 & named in tribute to Jane's Addiction.

== See also ==
- Two percent (disambiguation)
- 99% (disambiguation)
- 1 Club (disambiguation), including 1% Club
- Something About 1%, a South Korean TV drama
