= 100% (Victor och Natten song) =

Single by Victor och Natten
- Released: 28 February 2016
- Genre: Pop
- Length: 2:59
- Label: TinTinTune
- Songwriters: Dag Lundberg; Melker; Jesper Lundh

Victor och Natten singles chronology
"Normal" (2015)	"100%" (2016)

"100%" is a song by Swedish singer Victor och Natten. The song was released in Sweden as a digital download on 28 February 2016, and was written by Dag Lundberg, Melker, and Jesper Lundh. It took part in Melodifestivalen 2016, and placed sixth in the second semi-final.

== Track listing ==
Digital download
No.	Title	Length
1.	"100%"	2:59

== Charts ==
=== Weekly charts ===
Chart (2016)	Peak position
Sweden (Sverigetopplistan)	79

== Release history ==
Region	Date	Format	Label
Sweden	28 February 2016	Digital download	OC Agency AB
