= 99% =

99% may refer to:

== Music ==
- 99% (Meat Beat Manifesto album), 1990
- 99% (Ska-P album), 2013
- "99 Percenters", a 2011 song by Ministry
- "99%", a song by Soul Asylum from the 1992 album Grave Dancers Union

== Other uses ==
- 99 Percent – Civic Voice, a political party in Slovakia
- 99%: The Occupy Wall Street Collaborative Film, a 2013 documentary film
- We are the 99%, a political slogan

== See also ==
- One percent (disambiguation)
- Two percent (disambiguation)
- 99 cents (disambiguation)
- 99p (disambiguation)
- 99 Percent Declaration, an American not-for-profit organization
- 99.9%, a 2016 album by Kaytranada
- 0.999...
- Percentage
