= Club One =

US health club and gymnasium facility chain

Club One Inc.
- Industry: Health club, in-house gym facilities
- Founded: 1991; 35 years ago in San Francisco, California, United States
- Founders: Jill Kinney; John Kinney
- Defunct: 2014
- Fate: Acquired by Active Sports Clubs

Club One Fitness Centers (Club One Inc.) was a San Francisco-based chain of health clubs and in-house gymnasium facilities managed on behalf of corporate clients.

The chain was founded in 1991 by a husband and wife team who had operated health clubs before. Jill Kinney had been a professional downhill ski racer, before opening a small club, the Physis Gym, in San Francisco. She later became Chief Operating Officer of a nationwide chain, and was responsible for opening the original "Sports Club LA" Incorrectly noticing that nearly all health clubs were independent, she worked with future husband John Kinney to write a business plan for a multi-outlet health club. The couple obtained a founding investment from the Kikkoman soy sauce company, and opened their first gym in the Citicorp Center in San Francisco. It grew quickly during the dot com boom as many companies established in-house gyms as a perquisite for employees.

The first corporate facility was started in 1995, after Autodesk, Inc. contacted the couple about opening an in-house gym exclusively for company employees. Similar concessions were opened for The Gap and Electronic Arts

In 2004 the chain had 19 public clubs, several dozen in-house gyms with more than 500,000 corporate members, and approximately 1,500 employees in ten states. The company managed health clubs at six Jewish Community Centers.

In March 2014, Sausalito, CA-based Active Sports Clubs purchased the majority of the assets of Club One Inc.
