= Sweden in the Eurovision Song Contest 2010 =

- Eurovision Song Contest 2010
- Participating broadcaster: Sveriges Television (SVT)
- Country: Sweden
- Selection process: Melodifestivalen 2010
- Selection date: 13 March 2010

Competing entry
- Song: "This Is My Life"
- Artist: Anna Bergendahl
- Songwriters: Bobby Ljunggren; Kristian Lagerström

Placement
- Semi-final result: Failed to qualify (11th)

Participation chronology

Sweden was represented at the Eurovision Song Contest 2010 with the song "This Is My Life", written by Bobby Ljunggren and Kristian Lagerström, and performed by Anna Bergendahl. The Swedish participating broadcaster, Sveriges Television (SVT), organised the national final Melodifestivalen 2010 in order to select its entry for the contest. After a six-week-long competition consisting of four heats, a Second Chance round and a final, "This Is My Life" performed by Anna Bergendahl emerged as the winner after achieving the highest score following the combination of votes from six international jury groups, five regional jury groups and a public vote.

Sweden was drawn to compete in the second semi-final of the Eurovision Song Contest which took place on 27 May 2010. Performing during the show in position 6, "This Is My Life" was not announced among the top 10 entries of the second semi-final and therefore did not qualify to compete in the final. This marked the first time that Sweden failed to qualify to the final of the Eurovision Song Contest since the introduction of semi-finals in 2004. It was later revealed that Sweden placed eleventh out of the 17 participating countries in the semi-final with 62 points.

== Background ==
Prior to the 2010 contest, Sveriges Radio (SR) until 1979, and Sveriges Television (SVT) since 1980, had participated in the Eurovision Song Contest representing Sweden forty-nine times since SR's first entry in 1958. Sweden had won the contest on four occasions: in 1974 with the song "Waterloo" performed by ABBA, in 1984 with the song "Diggi-Loo Diggi-Ley" performed by Herreys, in 1991 with the song "Fångad av en stormvind" performed by Carola, and in 1999 with the song "Take Me to Your Heaven" performed by Charlotte Nilsson. Following the introduction of semi-finals for the 2004, Sweden's entries, to this point, have featured in every final. In 2009, Sweden placed twenty-first in the contest with the song "La voix" performed by Malena Ernman.

As part of its duties as participating broadcaster, SVT organises the selection of its entry in the Eurovision Song Contest and broadcasts the event in the country. Since 1959, SR first and SVT later have organised the annual competition Melodifestivalen in order to select their entries for the contest.

== Before Eurovision ==
=== Melodifestivalen 2010 ===
Melodifestivalen 2010 was the Swedish music competition that selected Sweden's entry for the Eurovision Song Contest 2010. 32 songs competed in a six-week-long process which consisted of four heats on 6, 13, 20 and 27 February 2010, a second chance round on 6 March 2010, and a final on 13 March 2010. The six shows were hosted by Christine Meltzer, Måns Zelmerlöw and Dolph Lundgren. Eight songs competed in each heat—the top two qualified directly to the final, while the third and fourth placed songs qualified to the second chance round. The bottom four songs in each heat were eliminated from the competition. An additional two songs qualified to the final from the second chance round. The results in the semi-finals and second chance round were determined exclusively by public televoting, while the overall winner of the competition was selected in the final through the combination of a public vote and the votes from six international jury groups and five regional jury groups. Among the competing artists were former Eurovision Song Contest contestants Jessica Andersson who represented Sweden in 2003 as part of the duo Fame and Andreas Lundstedt (participating as a member of Alcazar) who represented Switzerland in 2006.

==== Heats and Second Chance round ====
- The first heat took place on 6 February 2010 at the Fjällräven Center in Örnsköldsvik. "Keep On Walking" performed by Salem Al Fakir and "Unstoppable" performed by Ola Svensson qualified directly to the final, while "Road Salt" performed by Pain of Salvation and "I Did It for Love" performed by Jessica Andersson qualified to the Second Chance round. "A Place to Stay" performed by Jenny Silver, "You're Making Me Hot-Hot-Hot" performed by Linda Pritchard, "The Saviour" performed by Anders Ekborg, and "Singel" performed by Frispråkarn were eliminated.
- The second heat took place on 13 February 2010 at the Göransson Arena in Sandviken. "Manboy" performed by Eric Saade and "We Can Work It Out" performed by Andreas Johnson qualified directly to the final, while "Sucker for Love" performed by Pauline and "Underbart" performed by Kalle Moraeus and Orsa Spelmän qualified to the Second Chance round. "Hippare Hoppare" performed by Andra Generationen and Dogge Doggelito, "Innan alla ljusen brunnit ut" performed by Anna-Maria Espinosa, "Come and Get Me Now" performed by MiSt and Highlights, and "Manipulated" performed by Hanna Lindblad were eliminated.
- The third heat took place on 20 February 2010 at the Scandinavium in Gothenburg. "Kom" performed by Timoteij and "You're Out of My Life" performed by Darin qualified directly to the final, while "Headlines" performed by Alcazar and "Heaven or Hell" performed by Crucified Barbara qualified to the Second Chance round. "Tonight" performed by Johannes Bah Kuhnke, "Doctor Doctor" performed by Elin Lanto, "Hur kan jag tro på kärlek?" performed by Erik Linder, and "Yeba" performed by Getty Domein were eliminated.
- The fourth heat took place on 27 February 2010 at the Malmö Arena in Malmö. "This Is My Life" performed by Anna Bergendahl and "Hollow" performed by Peter Jöback qualified directly to the final, while "Human Frontier" performed by NEO and "Jag vill om du vågar" performed by Pernilla Wahlgren qualified to the Second Chance round. "Stop" performed by Sibel, "Magisk stjärna" performed by Py Bäckman, "Thursdays" performed by Lovestoned, and "Idiot" performed by Noll disciplin were eliminated.
- The Second Chance round (Andra chansen) took place on 6 March 2010 at the Conventum Arena in Örebro. "Jag vill om du vågar" performed by Pernilla Wahlgren and "I Did It for Love" performed by Jessica Andersson qualified to the final.

==== Final ====
The final was held on 13 March 2010 at the Globe Arena in Stockholm. Ten songs competed—two qualifiers from each of the four preceding heats and two qualifiers from the Second Chance round. The combination of points from a viewer vote, six international jury groups and five regional jury groups determined the winner. The viewers and the juries each had a total of 473 points to award. The nations that comprised the international jury were France, Greece, Ireland, Norway, Russia and Serbia, while the cities that comprised the regional jury were Gothenburg, Luleå, Malmö, Stockholm and Umeå. "This Is My Life" performed by Anna Bergendahl was selected as the winner with 214 points.

R/O	Artist	Song	Juries	Televote	Total	Place
1	Darin	"You're Out of My Life"	51	66	117	4
2	Pernilla Wahlgren	"Jag vill om du vågar"	12	0	12	10
3	Andreas Johnson	"We Can Work It Out"	50	0	50	6
4	Timoteij	"Kom"	51	44	95	5
5	Peter Jöback	"Hollow"	21	11	32	9
6	Ola Svensson	"Unstoppable"	47	0	47	7
7	Jessica Andersson	"I Did It for Love"	15	22	37	8
8	Salem Al Fakir	"Keep On Walking"	95	88	183	2
9	Anna Bergendahl	"This Is My Life"	82	132	214	1
10	Eric Saade	"Manboy"	49	110	159	3

== At Eurovision ==
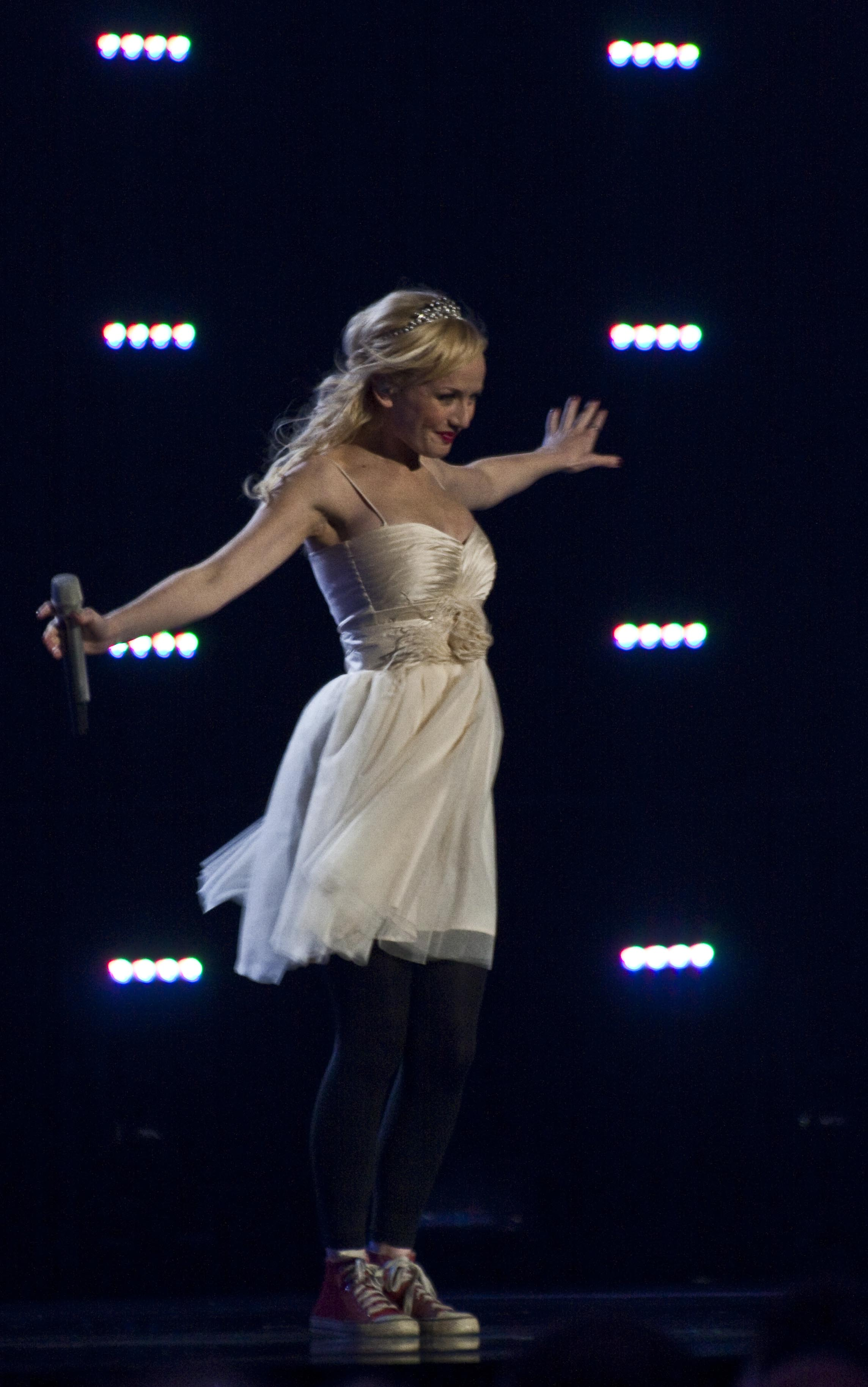
Anna Bergendahl during a rehearsal before the second semi-final

According to Eurovision rules, all nations with the exceptions of the host country and the "Big Four" (France, Germany, Spain and the United Kingdom) are required to qualify from one of two semi-finals in order to compete for the final; the top ten countries from each semi-final progress to the final. The European Broadcasting Union (EBU) split up the competing countries into six different pots based on voting patterns from previous contests, with countries with favourable voting histories put into the same pot. On 7 February 2010, a special allocation draw was held which placed each country into one of the two semi-finals. Sweden was placed into the second semi-final, to be held on 27 May 2010.

The running order for the semi-finals was decided through another draw on 23 March 2010 and Sweden was set to perform in position 6, following the entry from Switzerland and before the entry from Azerbaijan. At the end of the second semi-final, Sweden was not announced among the top 10 entries in the second semi-final and therefore failed to qualify to compete in the final. This marked the first time that Sweden failed to qualify to the final of the Eurovision Song Contest from a semi-final since the introduction of semi-finals in 2004. It was later revealed that Sweden placed eleventh in the semi-final, receiving a total of 62 points. Sweden was placed ninth by the public with 64 points and eleventh by the juries with 76 points.

The two semi-finals and the final were broadcast in Sweden on SVT1 with commentary by Christine Meltzer and Edward af Sillén. The three shows were also broadcast via radio on SR P4 with commentary by Carolina Norén and Björn Kjellman. The Swedish spokesperson, who announced the top 12-point score awarded by Sweden during the final, was Eric Saade.

=== Voting ===
Voting during the three shows involved each country awarding points from 1-8, 10 and 12 as determined by a combination of 50% national jury and 50% televoting. Each nation's jury consisted of five music industry professionals who are citizens of the country they represent. This jury judged each entry based on: vocal capacity; the stage performance; the song's composition and originality; and the overall impression by the act. In addition, no member of a national jury was permitted to be related in any way to any of the competing acts in such a way that they cannot vote impartially and independently. The members that comprised the Swedish jury were: Michael Cederberg (producer), Anna Charlotta Gunnarson (journalist), Helene Benno (journalist), Andreas Lundstedt (musician, represented Switzerland in the 2006 contest) and Eric Saade (singer-songwriter).

Below is a breakdown of points awarded to Sweden and awarded by Sweden in the second semi-final and grand final of the contest. The nation awarded its 12 points to Denmark in the semi-final and to Germany in the final of the contest.

==== Points awarded to Sweden ====
Points awarded to Sweden (Semi-final 2)
Score	Country
12 points	Denmark; Norway
10 points	Switzerland
8 points	
7 points	
6 points	Netherlands
5 points	Ireland
4 points	
3 points	Armenia; Lithuania; United Kingdom
2 points	Azerbaijan; Croatia; Turkey
1 point	Cyprus; Romania

==== Points awarded by Sweden ====
Points awarded by Sweden (Semi-final 2)
Score	Country
12 points	Denmark
10 points	Turkey
8 points	Israel
7 points	Romania
6 points	Cyprus
5 points	Armenia
4 points	Lithuania
3 points	Azerbaijan
2 points	Georgia
1 point	Netherlands

Points awarded by Sweden (Final)
Score	Country
12 points	Germany
10 points	Romania
8 points	Denmark
7 points	Serbia
6 points	Georgia
5 points	Turkey
4 points	Norway
3 points	Cyprus
2 points	Belgium
1 point	Armenia
