= I Never Said I Was an Angel =

I Never Said I Was An Angel

Studio album by Pauline Kamusewu
- Released: 22 April 2009
- Recorded: 2008–2009
- Genre: Pop; R&B
- Label: Tri Sound

Pauline Kamusewu chronology
Candy Rain (2003)	I Never Said I Was An Angel (2009)

I Never Said I Was an Angel is the second album by Swedish singer Pauline Kamusewu, released on 22 April 2009 through Tri Sound. A reissue added a CD single of Kamusewu's song for Melodifestivalen 2010, "Sucker for Love".

== Track listing ==
1. "I Never Said I Was an Angel"
2. "If You Don't Know Me"
3. "Red Carpet"
4. "Give Me a Call"
5. "Dancin"
6. "The Misconception"
7. "Happy People"
8. "Sunshine Boulevard"
9. "Loving You"
10. "It's OK"
11. "Running Out of Gaz"
12. "Don't Leave"

== Charts ==
Chart (2009)	Peak position
Swedish Albums (Sverigetopplistan)	10
