= Melodifestivalen 2010 =

Swedish music competition

Dates and venues
- Heat 1: 6 February 2010
- Heat 2: 13 February 2010
- Heat 3: 20 February 2010
- Heat 4: 27 February 2010
- Second chance: 6 March 2010
- Final: 13 March 2010; Globe Arena, Stockholm

Production
- Broadcaster: Sveriges Television (SVT)
- Director: Daniel Jelinek
- Presenters: Christine Meltzer; Måns Zelmerlöw; Dolph Lundgren

Participants
- Number of entries: 32: 8 in each heat; 10 in the final (2 from each heat, 2 from the Second Chance round)

Vote
- Voting system: 50% Jury, 50% SMS and telephone voting 11 juries (5 regional juries and six international juries) give 1, 2, 4, 6, 8, 10 and 12 points to their seven favourite songs. People can vote by televote or SMS. Televoting gives 11, 22, 44, 66, 88, 110 and 132 points to the seven most popular songs.
- Winning song: "This Is My Life" by Anna Bergendahl

Melodifestivalen 2010 was a Swedish song contest held in February and March 2010. It was the selection for the 50th song to represent Sweden in the Eurovision Song Contest, and was the 49th edition of Melodifestivalen. Five heats were held in the Swedish cities of Örnsköldsvik, Sandviken, Gothenburg and Malmö, with Örebro hosting the final Andra Chansen (Second Chance) round.

After the five heats 10 songs had qualified to the final of the contest, contested in the Swedish capital of Stockholm, at the Globe Arena. After the voting of 11 juries and a public televote had been revealed, the final winner was Anna Bergendahl with the pop ballad "This Is My Life", which received top marks from the public televote, and placed 2nd in the votes of the 11 juries.

The 2010 Melodifestivalen, as with recent editions of the festival, implemented a number of new rules which changed the dynamics of the contest, including the new "web wildcard" competition, held on the SVT website from October to November 2009, selecting the final heatist from submitted entries on the SVT website.

== Rules ==
The current Melodifestivalen rules were first introduced in 2002 – five heats are held every year: the first four heats each with 8 songs, where the top two songs directly qualify to the final of the contest, while the third and fourth-placed songs qualify to the final heat, the Andra Chansen (Second Chance) round. Eight songs compete in the Second Chance round, competing in a knock-out format until two songs are left, which qualify to the final. These songs are chosen by a public televote held on the night of the contest. The final consisted of 10 songs, who are awarded marks by 11 regional juries of Sweden, alongside televoting, with each comprising 50% of the total result.

28 songs are selected from a public call for songs by SVT. These are chosen from a large number of entries, with over 3000 entries being received by SVT in past contests. These songs are reduced by the Swedish Music Publishers Association (Svenska musikförläggareföreningen; SMFF), who reduce this large number to around 1200 entries. A sixteen-person jury reduce this number once again to the final 28 competing songs. These 28 songs are then joined by compositions by four songwriters invited by SVT, who each submit a song into the competition.

For the 2010 contest SVT decided to change parts of the format. The duels during the heats introduced in 2008 were abolished. The single "international jury" used in 2009, which selected an 11th finalist and voted during the final as a 12th jury, was also abolished. This was replaced by a complete change in the jury voting during the final - instead of 11 regional juries there would be 6 international juries in Russia, Ireland, Norway, Greece, Serbia and France voting on the 10 finalists along with 5 Swedish juries in Luleå, Umeå, Gothenburg, Malmö and Stockholm.

=== Changes ===
- In 2010, it was allowable to send multiple language versions of the same track as separate entries.
- Non-Swedish nationals could now submit entries to the wildcard selection of the contest.
- Viewers could use SVT's website to vote for the last wildcard in the contest.

== Details ==
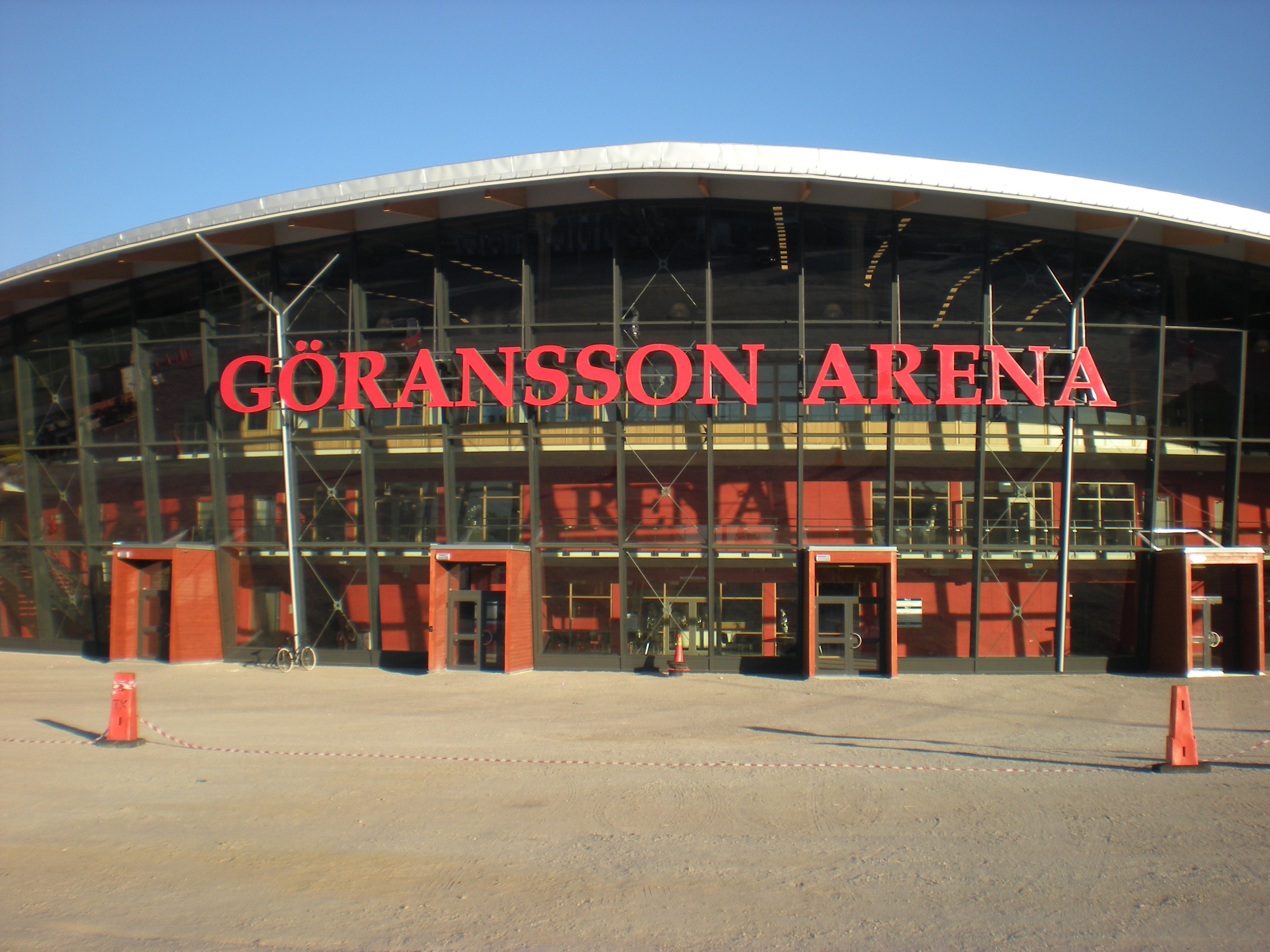
The Göransson Arena in Sandviken, Melodifestivalen 2010's "debut" city.

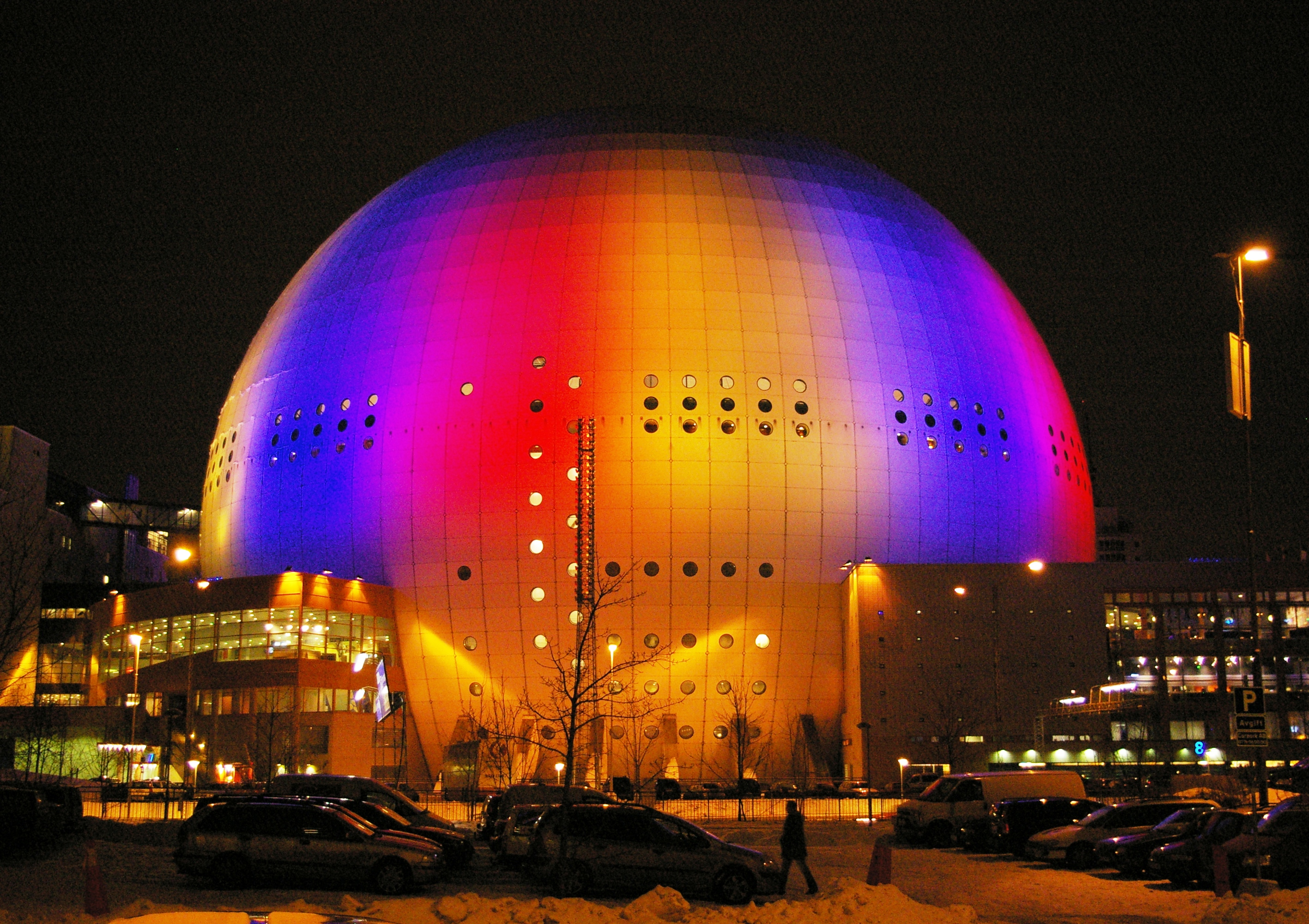
Stockholm's Globen, the venue for the final of Melodifestivalen 2010.

Six different cities hosted the six shows of Melodifestivalen, revealed on 27 August 2009. The opening heat was held at the Fjällräven Center in Örnsköldsvik; further heats were held in Sandviken's Göransson Arena, the first time the city has hosted a Melodifestivalen heat, the Scandinavium in Gothenburg and the Malmö Arena in Malmö. The Second Chance round was in Örebro's Conventum Arena, while the grand final would be held once again at Globen in Stockholm. There were plans to hold the 2010 final in Gothenburg, however as hockey matches clashed with the date of the final it was necessary to hold the final in Stockholm for the ninth consecutive year.

The dates for the six shows were announced at the same time, with the first heat held on 6 February 2010, with the final of the contest held on 13 March, over six weeks.

This year's contest was hosted by a trio: comedian Christine Meltzer, four-time Melodifestivalen participant and Future Eurovision winner in 2015 in Vienna, Måns Zelmerlöw, and actor Dolph Lundgren. The three hosts were revealed at a press conference by SVT on 10 November.

=== Schedule ===
| Date | City | Venue | Heat |
|---|---|---|---|
| 6 February | Örnsköldsvik | Fjällräven Center | Heat 1 |
| 13 February | Sandviken | Göransson Arena | Heat 2 |
| 20 February | Gothenburg | Scandinavium | Heat 3 |
| 27 February | Malmö | Malmö Arena | Heat 4 |
| 6 March | Örebro | Conventum Arena | Second Chance |
| 13 March | Stockholm | Globen | Final |

=== Visual design ===
The stage of the contest

The Melodifestivalen logo for the Contest, the five spotlights, has been in place since 2002, and remained in use for the 2010 Contest. The first details of the 2010 stage were released on 28 January. For the fourth time, the set was designed by Viktor Brattström, with the intention to provide the feeling of a club environment: "This year we can present a scene that should evoke the idea of an exclusive club environment. Levels and stairs offers artists the opportunity for action and linking the stage into a place of celebration."

The stage uses different height to allow the artists to use the stage most effectively to create their own number, and extensive use of LED screens to create different moods.

== Entries ==
32 songs competed in Melodifestivalen 2010. 27 of them were selected from a public call for songs, in which public songwriters and artists could send in songs to SVT, until 22 September 2009. Five songs were selected to compete in the contest as wildcards: SVT internally selected four songwriting teams and artists to compete in the contest, to diversify the musical quality of the competition; a final song was selected through a "web wildcard" competition, with the Swedish public selecting one song by an unknown act to progress to the heats.

=== Wildcards ===
As since 2004 SVT has specially invited four artists and composers to compete in Melodifestivalen, in order to diversify the musical qualify of the contest. As well as this the 2010 contest introduced a "web wildcard" competition, in which songwriters who were not linked to any record companies could publish compositions over two weeks in September and October 2009 on SVT Melodifestivalen website. The winner of the web wildcard was selected by the Swedish public through SMS voting, with the song that received the most votes by 12 November competing in the televised heats.

The first wildcard competing in Melodifestivalen 2010 was revealed by SVT on 3 November 2009, with Darin selected by SVT to perform in the contest with the song "Out Of My Life", written by Tony Nilsson and Henrik Jansson. SVT revealed the winner of the web wildcard contest on 12 November 2009 on SVT's morning news programme Gomorron Sverige. The winning song was "Come And Get Me Now", performed by MiSt. On 5 December MiST and Melodifestivalen's producer Christer Björkman approached the band Highlights, a participant in the Dansbandskampen competition, to join MiSt on stage in Melodifestivalen, which they accepted.

On 16 November 2009, Salem Al Fakir was announced as the second wildcard participant, and it was announced he would take part with the song "Keep on Walking", which he wrote and composed himself. SVT revealed the third wildcard for MF 2010 on 3 December 2009: Peter Jöback was selected by SVT to compete in the competition, where he would sing "Hollow", composed by Anders Hansson and Fredrik Kempe. SVT's fourth and final wildcard was announced on 7 January 2010. Soul singer Pauline Kamusewu would compete in the second semifinal of Melodifestivalen with the song "Sucker for Love", written by herself and Fredrik "Fredro" Ödesjö, Andreas Levander and Johan "Jones" Wetterberg.

| Artist | Song | Heat | Result in heat |
|---|---|---|---|
| Salem Al Fakir | "Keep on Walking" | Örnsköldsvik | Final – 1st place |
| MiSt & Highlights | "Come And Get Me Now" | Sandviken | Out – 7th place |
| Pauline | "Sucker for Love" | Sandviken | Andra Chansen – 4th place |
| Darin | "You're Out of My Life" | Gothenburg | Final - 2nd place |
| Peter Jöback | "Hollow" | Malmö | Final - 2nd place |

==== Web wildcard ====
The first web wildcard contest for Melodifestivalen was held from September to November 2009. This allowed new promising talents a new way to enter Melodifestivalen instead of through the regular public submission process, in which amateur musicians rarely succeeded. Musicians who didn't have or had never had any contract with a music publishing house or never had any of their work published could enter songs onto SVT's Melodifestivalen website from 21 September to 4 October. From 14 October to 12 November 2009, the qualifying songs were voted for by SMS voting in Sweden, with the winning song being decided on 12 November 2009

246 songs were submitted for the web wildcard, with 180 selected to compete in the competition, after disqualifying those that did not meet the rules of the contest. Over the following weeks the bottom songs in the public SMS vote were eliminated from the contest, leaving 10 songs left:

- 14 October 2009 – all 180 entries were made available for voting
- 21 October 2009 – 100 entries went on to the next round
- 28 October 2009 – 50 entries went on to the next round
- 4–12 November 2009– ten entries were left, one would be voted out every day
- 12 November 2009 – winner announced

On 4 November the top ten songs were announced by SVT. Each day, until 11 November 2009, one song was eliminated from the competition, with only three songs left. The winner was announced on 12 November at 8:45 am on SVT's morning news programme Gomorron Sverige, with the duo MiSt (Mia Terngård & Stefan Lebert) winning the contest with the song was "Come and Get Me Now".

| Artist | Song (English translation) | Songwriter(s) | Place | Date Eliminated |
|---|---|---|---|---|
| MiSt | "Come and Get Me Now" | Mia Terngård, Stefan Lebert | 1 | Winner |
| Jessica Friberg | "Break Free" | Jessica Friberg, Johannes Hansson | 2 | 12 November |
| Adam Sandahl | "Kärleken vänder allt" (The love turns everything) | Adam Sandahl | 3 | 12 November |
| Genjor McNell | "My Kind of Love" | Jörgen Frinell | 4 | 11 November |
| Ingela Hemming | "Love for People" | Ingela Hemming | 5 | 10 November |
| Mark | "I'll Make You Want Me" | Mark Woznicki | 6 | 9 November |
| Johan Skoog | "När vi har landat" (Once we have landed) | Johan Skoog, Martin Hägglund | 7 | 8 November |
| Siberia | "Hot for the Night" | Peter Månsson | 8 | 7 November |
| Halla Viljhalmsdottir | "How" | Halla Vilhjalmsdottir | 9 | 6 November |
| Alrik Paulsson | "Lite sex och lite spex" (A little sex and a little farce) | Alrik Paulsson | 10 | 5 November |

=== Disqualified songs ===
On 14 October 2009 SVT revealed the first 27 entries which the jury had selected, of a total of 2860 submissions to the contest. However, on 15 October 2009, it was announced that "Never Heard of Him", composed by Figge Boström and Anna Engh, was disqualified after it appeared briefly on Figge Boström's MySpace page. The song was replaced on 20 October 2009 by "You're Making Me Hot-Hot-Hot", written by Tobias Lundgren, Johan Fransson and Tim Larsson.

On 27 November 2009, the song "Åt helvete för sent" was disqualified by the public broadcaster of Sweden, SVT, because the decision on the artist to perform it (Rikard Wolff, Sara Löfgren or Mathias Holmgren) was being obstructed by the team responsible for the song. The entry to replace the disqualified song was the song "The Saviour" by Henrik Janson and Tony Nilsson.

== Heats ==
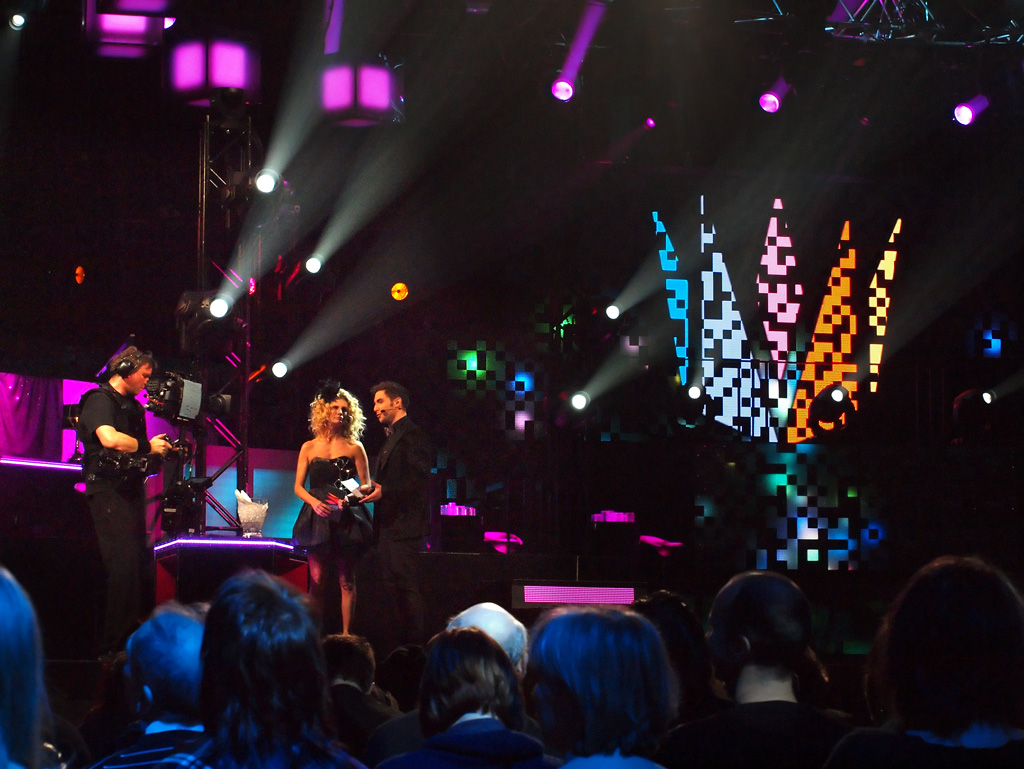
Hosts Christine Meltzer and Måns Zelmerlöw during the second heat in Sandviken.

The heats were held this year in Örnsköldsvik, Sandviken, Gothenburg and Malmö. SVT released 13 artists on 30 November 2009 which performed in the first and the second heat. On 7 December 2009 a further 14 entries were released, who competed in the third and fourth heats.

SVT announced the running order for the heats on 8 January 2010. Ola Svensson opened the contest in the first heat, and wildcard Peter Jöback closed the heats at the fourth heat.

New voting measures in the heats were implemented, with the song receiving the most votes in the first round automatically qualifying to the final, skipping the second round. The remaining top 4 battled again for a place in the final and Andra Chansen round - the 2nd placed song qualifying to the final, and the 3rd and 4th placed songs progressing to Andra Chansen.

=== Heat 1 ===
The first heat was held on 6 February 2010 in Fjällräven Center, Örnsköldsvik. One minute clips of the eight competing songs were released by SVT on 5 February.

The first heat began with a performance by former Melodifestivalen contestants Charlotte Perrelli, Nanne Grönvall and Sonja Aldén of the Bonnie Tyler song "Holding Out for a Hero".

The first performance of the night was by Andra Chansen participant in Melodifestivalen 2008 Ola Svensson, and his song "Unstoppable", an uptempo Europop song. Ola, dressed in casual clothes, was joined by a pianist, and gave a simple performance with effective use of light movement, and later using pyrotechnics. Jenny Silver was next on stage, performing her slow-tempo electronic number "A Place to Stay". Silver was dressed in a golden corset and a single steel glove on her left arm, and performed alone on stage to flashing lights in the background. Linda Pritchard performed her song "You're Making Me Hot-Hot-Hot", a strong dance number, next on stage. Pritchard was joined on stage by six female backing dancers, with dancing typically being an integral part of her stage performance. Metal band Pain of Salvation was next on stage, performing "Road Salt", a slow rock song. The band was dressed in casual clothes and gave a minimalist performance, with only lead vocals and keyboard performing and the remaining band members not playing.

The fifth act to take the stage in Örnsköldsvik was Anders Ekborg and "The Saviour", with an operatic and theatrical beginning, later turning more rock-ish. Ekborg, dressed in a suit, was joined by six female backing singers/dancers. Jessica Andersson, who represented Sweden at the Eurovision Song Contest 2003 as a member of Fame next took the stage with "I Did It for Love", a strong ballad. Andersson performed alone on stage in a navy dress, and the song builds to a large climax during the choruses, before ending slowly. The penultimate act was Frispråkarn and his hip-hop/rap song "Singel" (Single), the first song performed in Swedish in the contest, joined on stage by six female backing dancers/singers in black dresses. The final act on stage was wildcard entry Salem Al Fakir and his song "Keep on Walking". Al Fakir performed alone on stage playing from a grand piano, dressed in a grey suit, with changing colours featured prominently in the back and floor screens and on the piano keys.

After the end of the first round of voting Jenny Silver, Frispråkarn and Anders Ekborg were eliminated from the competition after getting the fewest votes, coming 8th, 7th and 6th respectively. Furthermore, Salem Al Fakir progressed to the final, after coming first in the televoting, leaving the remaining four acts to compete for the remaining places in the next round.

Ola Svensson, Linda Pritchard, Pain of Salvation and Jessica Andersson competed again in the second round of televoting for the final places. At the end of the televoting Ola Svensson was selected to progress to the final, while Pain of Salvation and Jessica Andersson qualified to the Andra Chansen round.

SVT experienced technical problems when broadcasting the first heat in high-definition. The first 30 minutes of the show were broadcast in normal resolution, and after this was corrected there was audio interference in HD, which affected the broadcast of "Road Salt" over HD. However, SVT chosen to give "Road Salt" 10 extra seconds in the first song summary.

| R/O | Artist | Song | Songwriter(s) | Votes | | Place | Result |
| R/O | Artist | Song | Songwriter(s) | Round 1 | Round 2 | Place | Result |
|---|---|---|---|---|---|---|---|
| 1 | Ola Svensson | "Unstoppable" | Dimitri Stassos (m & l), Alexander Kronlund (m & l), Hanif Sabzevari (m & l), Ola Svensson (m & l) | 44 796 | 64 601 | 2 | Final |
| 2 | Jenny Silver | "A Place to Stay" | Torben Hedlund (m & l) | 6 970 | — | 8 | Out |
| 3 | Linda Pritchard | "You're Making Me Hot-Hot-Hot" | Tobias Lundgren (m & l), Johan Fransson (m & l), Tim Larsson (m & l) | 27 482 | 34 609 | 5 | Out |
| 4 | Pain of Salvation | "Road Salt" | Daniel Gildenlöw (m & l) | 28 457 | 46 788 | 4 | Second Chance |
| 5 | Anders Ekborg | "The Saviour" | Henrik Janson (m & l), Tony Nilsson (m & l) | 26 044 | — | 6 | Out |
| 6 | Jessica Andersson | "I Did It for Love" | Lars "Dille" Diedricson (m), Kristian Wejshag (l) | 45 622 | 57 629 | 3 | Second Chance |
| 7 | Frispråkarn | "Singel" (Single) | Hamed K-One Pirouzpanah (m), Håkan Bäckman (l) | 13 592 | — | 7 | Out |
| 8 | Salem Al Fakir | "Keep on Walking" | Salem Al Fakir (m & l) | 47 047 | — | 1 | Final |

2,975,000 watched the first heat on SVT, with 446,411 votes cast during the heat, giving 1,065,492kr was donated to SVT's charity appeal Radiohjälpen.

=== Heat 2 ===
The second heat was held on February 13 in Göransson Arena, Sandviken. One minute clips of the eight competing songs were released by SVT on 12 February.

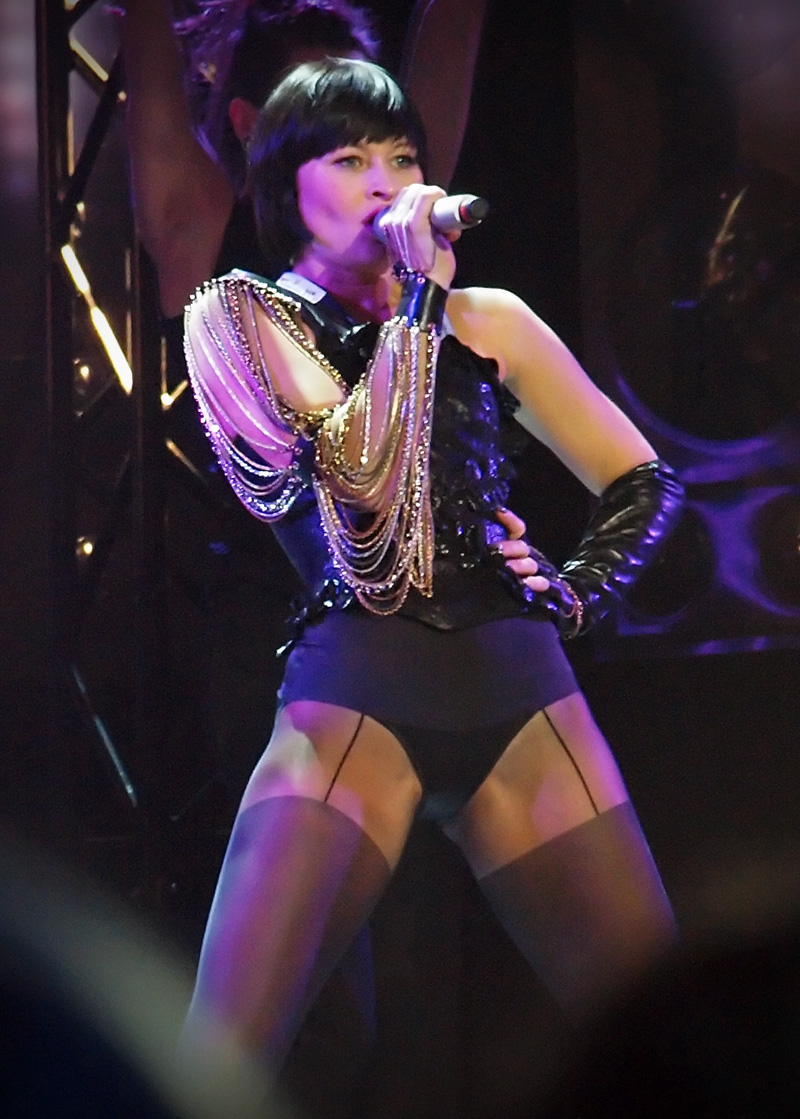
Hanna Lindblad performing during the second heat.

The first act on stage in Sandviken was Eric Saade with his song "Manboy", written by two-time Melodifestivalen winning songwriter Fredrik Kempe, and Peter Boström. Saade performed his up-tempo Europop song on stage with six backing dancers in casual clothes, and towards the end of his performance was subject to a torrent of falling water. Melodifestivalen 2008 participants Andra Generationen, joined by Dogge Doggelito, were next on stage, performing "Hippare Hoppare", mixing Balkan music, reggae and hip hop, performed in Swedish. Anna-Maria Espinosa followed on stage, performing the dramatic Swedish ballad "Innan alla ljusen brunnit ut" (Before all the candles had burnt out). Espinosa performed alone on stage, with light and darkness enhancing the slow ballad. The fourth act on stage was web wildcard winner MiSt, now joined by dansband Highlights, performing "Come and Get Me Now", now in a typical dansband style, with Highlights taking lead vocals and MiSt band-members Mia Terngård and Stefan Lebert taking backing vocals.

Heat 2's wildcard Pauline was next to perform on stage, singing "Sucker for Love", a mid-60s style R'n'B song, a style not seen in Melodifestivalen before. Pauline and her backing dancers were all dressed in outfits from the period. Prolific Melodifestivalen competitor Andreas Johnson, taking part in his fourth Melodifestivalen in five years, was next on the Sandviken stage with the song "We Can Work It Out". Johnson performed the strong ballad alone on stage in white light and dressed in green. The penultimate act on stage was Kalle Moraeus & Orsa Spelmän with the song "Underbart" (Wonderful), a gentle folk ballad and the third entry in the second heat sung in Swedish, with the band and backing singers dressed in black. Hanna Lindblad was the last act to perform in Sandviken, performing the electric disco song "Manipulated". Lindblad and her backing dancers were dressed black skin-tight outfits for her performance.

After the first round of voting Anna-Maria Espinosa, Highlights & MiSt and Andra Generationen & Dogge Doggelito were eliminated from the competition after getting the fewest votes, coming 8th, 7th and 6th place respectively. Furthermore, Eric Saade was chosen to progress directly to the final in Globen, leaving the four remaining acts to compete for the remaining three places in the final and Andra Chansen rounds.

Pauline, Andreas Johnson, Kalle Moraeus & Orsa Spelmän and Hanna Lindblad continued to fight for advancement in the competition, and after a second round of televoting Andreas Johnson was selected to progress to the final, while Pauline and Kalle Moraeus & Orsa Spelmän qualified to the Andra Chansen round.

| R/O | Artist | Song | Songwriter(s) | Votes | | Place | Result |
| R/O | Artist | Song | Songwriter(s) | Round 1 | Round 2 | Place | Result |
|---|---|---|---|---|---|---|---|
| 1 | Eric Saade | "Manboy" | Fredrik Kempe (m & l), Peter Boström (m) | 58 005 | — | 1 | Final |
| 2 | Andra Generationen & Dogge Doggelito | "Hippare Hoppare" | Vlatko Ancevski (m & l), Vlatko Gicarevski (m & l), Mats Nilsson (m & l), Teddy Paunkoski (m & l), Otis Sandsjö (m & l), Stevan Tomulevski (m & l), Douglas Léon (m & l) | 18 411 | — | 6 | Out |
| 3 | Anna-Maria Espinosa | "Innan alla ljusen brunnit ut" (Before all the candles have burned out) | Stefan Woody (m), Danne Attlerud (l) | 6 155 | — | 8 | Out |
| 4 | MiSt & Highlights | "Come and Get Me Now" | Mia Terngård (m & l), Stefan Lebert (m) | 10 978 | — | 7 | Out |
| 5 | Pauline | "Sucker for Love" | Fredrik "Fredro" Ödesjö (m), Andreas Levander (m), Johan "Jones" Wetterberg (m), Pauline Kamusewu (l) | 37 478 | 53 604 | 4 | Second Chance |
| 6 | Andreas Johnson | "We Can Work It Out" | Bobby Ljunggren (m), Marcos Ubeda (m), Andreas Johnson (l) | 43 794 | 66 794 | 2 | Final |
| 7 | Kalle Moraeus & Orsa Spelmän | "Underbart" (Wonderful) | Johan Moraeus (m), Lina Eriksson (l) | 54 912 | 57 063 | 3 | Second Chance |
| 8 | Hanna Lindblad | "Manipulated" | Sarah Lundbäck (m & l), Iggy Strange Dahl (m & l), Hayden Bell (m & l), Erik Lewander (m & l) | 22 504 | 27 287 | 5 | Out |

2,825,000 watched the second heat, with 460,984 votes cast during the heat, making a total of 1,028,126kr donated to SVT's Radiohjälpen.

=== Heat 3 ===
The third heat was held on 20 February in Scandinavium, Gothenburg. One minute clips of the eight competing songs were released by SVT on 19 February.

After the eight performances and the first round of voting, Johannes Bah Kuhnke, Elin Lanto and Getty were eliminated from the contest, while Timoteij progressed direct to the final in Globen, leaving Alcazar, Erik Linder, Darin and Crucified Barbara to fight for the remaining places.

After the second round of voting Alcazar and Crucified Barbara progressed to the Andra Chansen round, while Darin joins Timoteij in the final.

There was concern that Darin's song "You're Out of My Life" would be disqualified after it was incorrectly made available to purchase during the week after the heat. A total of 54 downloads of the full studio version were made, making a #95 entry into the Swedish singles chart. However SVT confirmed that Darin would not be disqualified as the mistake was made by the distributor and not by Darin or his management. The song was subsequently taken off the music store, and was officially released later on, along with the rest of the competing Melodifestivalen songs.

| R/O | Artist | Song | Songwriter(s) | Votes | | Place | Result |
| R/O | Artist | Song | Songwriter(s) | Round 1 | Round 2 | Place | Result |
|---|---|---|---|---|---|---|---|
| 1 | Alcazar | "Headlines" | Tony Nilsson (m & l), Peter Boström (m & l) | 31 978 | 40 234 | 4 | Second Chance |
| 2 | Johannes Bah Kuhnke | "Tonight" | Sharon Vaughn (m & l), Anders Hansson (m & l) | 6 201 | — | 8 | Out |
| 3 | Elin Lanto | "Doctor Doctor" | Tony Nilsson (m & l), Mirja Breitholtz (m & l) | 16 491 | — | 7 | Out |
| 4 | Erik Linder | "Hur kan jag tro på kärlek?" (How can I believe in love?) | Tony Malm (m), Niclas Lundin (m), Kenneth Gärdestad (l) | 22 327 | 28 482 | 5 | Out |
| 5 | Getty Domein | "Yeba" | Tuomas (Tiny) Pyhäjärvi (m), Getty Domein Mpanzu (l) | 16 572 | — | 6 | Out |
| 6 | Timoteij | "Kom" (Come) | Niclas Arn (m), Karl Eurén (l), Gustav Eurén (l) | 65 762 | — | 1 | Final |
| 7 | Darin | "You're Out of My Life" | Henrik Janson (m & l), Tony Nilsson (m & l) | 63 144 | 113 593 | 2 | Final |
| 8 | Crucified Barbara | "Heaven or Hell" | Håkan Larsson (m & l), Jörgen Svensson (m & l), Björn Lönnroos (m & l) | 51 179 | 61 923 | 3 | Second Chance |

2,875,000 watched the third heat, and 521,115 votes were cast during the show, donating 920,805kr to charity Radiohjälpen.

=== Heat 4 ===
The fourth and final heat was held on 27 February in Malmö Arena, Malmö. One-minute clips were released by SVT on Monday 22 February, four days earlier than planned, after two of the eight songs were leaked on a Yahoo! chat group on Saturday 20 February, and to ensure that no song had an advantage over others.

After the first round of televoting concluded after the eight performances, Py Bäckman, Sibel and Lovestoned were eliminated from the competition, coming 8th, 7th and 6th in the voting respectively. Anna Bergendahl was also selected to progress to the final directly after receiving the most televotes. The remaining four acts went on to compete in the second round of televoting.

NEO, Pernilla Wahlgren, Noll disciplin and Peter Jöback fought for the remaining places in the final and Andra Chansen rounds. NEO and Pernilla Wahlgren were selected for the Andra Chansen round, with Peter Jöback heading to the final.

| R/O | Artist | Song | Songwriter(s) | Votes | | Place | Result |
| R/O | Artist | Song | Songwriter(s) | Round 1 | Round 2 | Place | Result |
|---|---|---|---|---|---|---|---|
| 1 | Sibel | "Stop" | Mikaela Stenström (m & l), Dimitri Stassos (m & l) | 16 513 | — | 7 | Out |
| 2 | Py Bäckman | "Magisk stjärna" (Magical star) | Py Bäckman (m & l), Micke Wennborn (m) | 3 822 | — | 8 | Out |
| 3 | NEO | "Human Frontier" | Tobias Jonsson (m & l), Anneli Axelsson (m & l) | 25 772 | 31 110 | 4 | Second Chance |
| 4 | Lovestoned | "Thursdays" | Thomas G:son (m), Peter Boström (m), Sharon Vaughn (l) | 25 070 | — | 6 | Out |
| 5 | Anna Bergendahl | "This Is My Life" | Bobby Ljunggren (m), Kristian Lagerström (l) | 52 838 | — | 1 | Final |
| 6 | Pernilla Wahlgren | "Jag vill om du vågar" (I want if you dare) | Pontus Assarsson (m & l), Jörgen Ringqvist (m & l), Daniel Barkman (l), Pernilla Wahlgren (l) | 36 138 | 42 439 | 3 | Second Chance |
| 7 | Noll disciplin | "Idiot" | Niklas Jarl (m & l), Per Aldeheim (m & l) | 27 504 | 26 082 | 5 | Out |
| 8 | Peter Jöback | "Hollow" | Anders Hansson (m & l), Fredrik Kempe (m & l) | 49 464 | 61 099 | 2 | Final |

A total of 2,510,000 watched the fourth heat, with 400,496 votes cast during the heat, giving a donation of 693,676.50kr to SVT's charity Radiohjälpen.

=== Second Chance ===
The Andra Chansen (Second Chance) round was held on 6 March in Conventum Arena, Örebro. Eight acts qualified for this round from the heats - the songs that placed 3rd and 4th. A duel format was used, with each song battling against another in order to remain in the contest, and qualify for the final on 13 March.

In the first duel Pain of Salvation was defeated by Pernilla Wahlgren, and Crucified Barbara won against Pauline to advance to the second stage. Kalle Moraeus & Orsa Spelmän and Jessica Andersson also progressed to the next stage after beating NEO and Alcazar respectively.

In the second stage Pernilla Wahlgren and Crucified Barbara competed against each other, as did Kalle Moraeus & Orsa Spelmän and Jessica Andersson. Wahlgren and Andersson were the winning acts, and progressed to the final with their songs "Jag vill om du vågar" and "I Did It for Love".

2,895,000 people viewed the Andra Chansen round, and 853,180 votes were cast during the show, giving 1,748,067kr to Radiohjälpen.

Round 1
Pain of Salvation - "Road Salt" | 52,570
Pernilla Wahlgren - "Jag vill om du vågar" | 62,677
Pauline - "Sucker for Love" | 50,111
Crucified Barbara - "Heaven or Hell" | 54,139
Kalle Moraeus & Orsa Spelmän - "Underbart" | 81,619
NEO - "Human Frontier" | 50 700
Alcazar - "Headlines" | 68,618
Jessica Andersson - "I Did It for Love" | 94,623

Round 2
Pernilla Wahlgren - "Jag vill om du vågar" | 79,693
Crucified Barbara - "Heaven or Hell" | 74,933
Kalle Moraeus & Orsa Spelmän - "Underbart" | 90,050
Jessica Andersson - "I Did It for Love" | 93,447

Qualified
Pernilla Wahlgren - "Jag vill om du vågar"
Jessica Andersson - "I Did It for Love"

== Final ==
The final of Melodifestivalen 2010 was held on 13 March 2010 at the Globe Arena in Stockholm. 10 songs qualified for the final, two from each of the four heats and the Andra Chansen round. The winner was decided by a mix of televoting/SMS voting and jury voting.

The running order for the final had been revealed on 7 March 2010. Darin opened the final with his song "You're Out of My Life", and Eric Saade closed the performances with "Manboy".

The interval act for the final was a Norwegian "invasion", and a medley of Melodifestivalen and Eurovision songs from Norway and Sweden. Acts performing in the interval act included Afro-dite, Charmed, Shirley Clamp, Maria Haukaas Storeng, Marie Rosenmir, One More Time, Lars-Ante Kuhmunen, Roger Pontare, Åge Sten "Glam" Nilsen of Wig Wam, Jakob Samuel of The Poodles, Towa Carson, Hanne Krogh, Kikki Danielsson, Bobbysocks!, Chips, and Kikki, Bettan & Lotta, concluding with Norway's Eurovision Song Contest 2009 winner Alexander Rybak. A rock version of last year's Melodifestivalen winner "La voix" was also performed by the band Casablanca, joined by last year's winner Malena Ernman.

The voting in the final was made up of both televoting/SMS voting and jury voting. 5 juries from the Swedish cities of Stockholm, Gothenburg, Malmö, Luleå and Umeå, and 6 international juries located in Russia, Ireland, Norway, Greece, Serbia and France – each gave 1, 2, 4, 6, 8, 10 and 12 points to their favourite songs. This was joined by televoting, with the total number of votes being converted into a set number of points – 11, 22, 44, 66, 88, 110 and 132 points were given to the most-popular songs of the total televote from around Sweden. Anna Bergendahl was the winner of Melodifestivalen 2010 with "This Is My Life", coming first in the public televote and second in the jury vote. The jury favourite, Salem Al Fakir, finished in 2nd place.

3,870,000 people viewed the final show on SVT. 1,754,904 televotes were cast during the final evening, donating 3,450,099kr to the Radiohjälpen appeal.

| R/O | Artist | Song | Juries | Televote/SMS/App | | | Total | Place |
| R/O | Artist | Song | Juries | Votes | Percentage | Points | Total | Place |
|---|---|---|---|---|---|---|---|---|
| 1 | Darin | "You're Out of My Life" | 51 | 209.392 | 12.0% | 66 | 117 | 4 |
| 2 | Pernilla Wahlgren | "Jag vill om du vågar" | 12 | 37.408 | 2.1% | 0 | 12 | 10 |
| 3 | Andreas Johnson | "We Can Work It Out" | 50 | 59.587 | 3.4% | 0 | 50 | 6 |
| 4 | Timoteij | "Kom" | 51 | 188.002 | 10.7% | 44 | 95 | 5 |
| 5 | Peter Jöback | "Hollow" | 21 | 77.776 | 4.4% | 11 | 32 | 9 |
| 6 | Ola Svensson | "Unstoppable" | 47 | 74.358 | 4.3% | 0 | 47 | 7 |
| 7 | Jessica Andersson | "I Did It for Love" | 15 | 110.339 | 6.3% | 22 | 37 | 8 |
| 8 | Salem Al Fakir | "Keep on Walking" | 95 | 299.746 | 17.1% | 88 | 183 | 2 |
| 9 | Anna Bergendahl | "This Is My Life" | 82 | 363.546 | 20.8% | 132 | 214 | 1 |
| 10 | Eric Saade | "Manboy" | 49 | 334.750 | 19.1% | 110 | 159 | 3 |

| R/O | Song | International Juries | | | | | | Regional Juries | | | | | Total |
| R/O | Song | Russia | Serbia | Greece | France | Ireland | Norway | Luleå | Umeå | Gothenburg | Malmö | Stockholm | Total |
| R/O | Song | Russia | Serbia | Greece | France | Ireland | Norway | Luleå | Umeå | Gothenburg | Malmö | Stockholm | Total |
|---|---|---|---|---|---|---|---|---|---|---|---|---|---|
| 1 | "You're Out of My Life" | 12 | | 12 | 2 | | 2 | 4 | 1 | 2 | 8 | 8 | 51 |
| 2 | "Jag vill om du vågar" | | 4 | | | 6 | 1 | 1 | | | | | 12 |
| 3 | "We Can Work It Out" | 4 | 6 | 10 | 10 | 4 | 4 | | | 6 | 4 | 2 | 50 |
| 4 | "Kom" | 2 | 2 | 6 | 4 | 8 | 8 | 12 | 8 | | 1 | | 51 |
| 5 | "Hollow" | | | | 1 | | | | 4 | 10 | | 6 | 21 |
| 6 | "Unstoppable" | 1 | 12 | 1 | 8 | 12 | | 2 | | 4 | 6 | 1 | 47 |
| 7 | "I Did It for Love" | | 1 | 2 | | | | 6 | 6 | | | | 15 |
| 8 | "Keep on Walking" | 10 | 10 | | 12 | 1 | 12 | 10 | 10 | 8 | 10 | 12 | 95 |
| 9 | "This Is My Life" | 8 | | 4 | | 10 | 6 | 8 | 12 | 12 | 12 | 10 | 82 |
| 10 | "Manboy" | 6 | 8 | 8 | 6 | 2 | 10 | | 2 | 1 | 2 | 4 | 49 |
Jury spokespersons
Russia – Antonina Ordina; Serbia – Jovan Radomir; Greece – Alexandra Pascalidou; France – Amina Annabi; Ireland – Donal Hamill; Norway – Alexander Rybak; Luleå – Lena Callne; Umeå – Doreen Manson; Göteborg – Timo Räisänen; Malmö – Robin Paulsson; Stockholm – Lotta Bromé

== See also ==
- Melodifestivalen
- Eurovision Song Contest 2010
- Sweden in the Eurovision Song Contest 2010
