= Give Me a Call =

Give Me a Call may refer to:

- "Give Me a Call" (song), by Pauline Kamusewu, 2009
- "Give Me a Call", a song by 311 from Evolver
- "Give Me a Call", a song by Mike Jones from The Voice
- "Give Me a Call", an episode of Peep and the Big Wide World
