= Mitt julkort =

Studio album by Jenny Öhlund
- Released: December 1994
- Genre: Christmas, schlager
- Length: circa 52 minutes
- Label: KM (CD); Mariann (MC)

Jenny Öhlund chronology
Mitt julkort (1994)	Lycklig (1997)

Mitt julkort is a 1994 Jenny Öhlund Christmas album, and her debut album as a solo artist, though members of her former band, Candela, also contribute. The CD version was released through the KM label, and the cassette tape through the Mariann label.

== Track listing ==
1. Låt julen förkunna (Happy Christmas (War Is Over)) (J. Lennon-J. Ono-P. Bäckman)
2. Jingeling, tingeling (Sleigh Ride) (L. Andersson-M. Parish-B. Wolgers)
3. Julen är här (B. Butt/S. Rydell)
4. Julen är här i vårt hus (Rockin' Around the Christmas Tree) (J. Marks-K. Almgren)
5. Gläns över sjö och strand (A. Tegner-V. Rydberg)
6. Jag såg mamma kyssa tomten (I Saw Mommy Kissing Santa Claus) (T. Connor-Ninita)
7. Hemmets jul (R. Cedermark)
8. Jag drömmer om en jul hemma (White Christmas) (I. Berlin-Karl-Lennart)
9. Rudolf med röda mulen (Rudolph the Red-Nosed Reindeer) (J. Marks-E. Sandström)
10. Natten tänder ljus på himlen (L. Andersson-C. von Melen)
11. Det hände sig för länge sedan (Mary's Boychild) (J. Hairston-J. Erixon-Arr: G. Keller)
12. Stilla natt (Stille Nacht, heilige Nacht, F. Gruber-O. Mannström Arr: G. Keller)
13. Den julen (Last Christmas) (G. Michael-Å. Lindfors)
14. Bella Notte (S. Burke-P. Lee-G. Sandberg-L. Reuterskiöld)
15. Härlig är jorden (Schönster Herr Jesu, Silesian folksong) (lyrics: Severin-Ingman/Båth-Holmberg) Arr: G.Keller)
