= Conventum Arena =

Exhibition centre in Örebro, Sweden

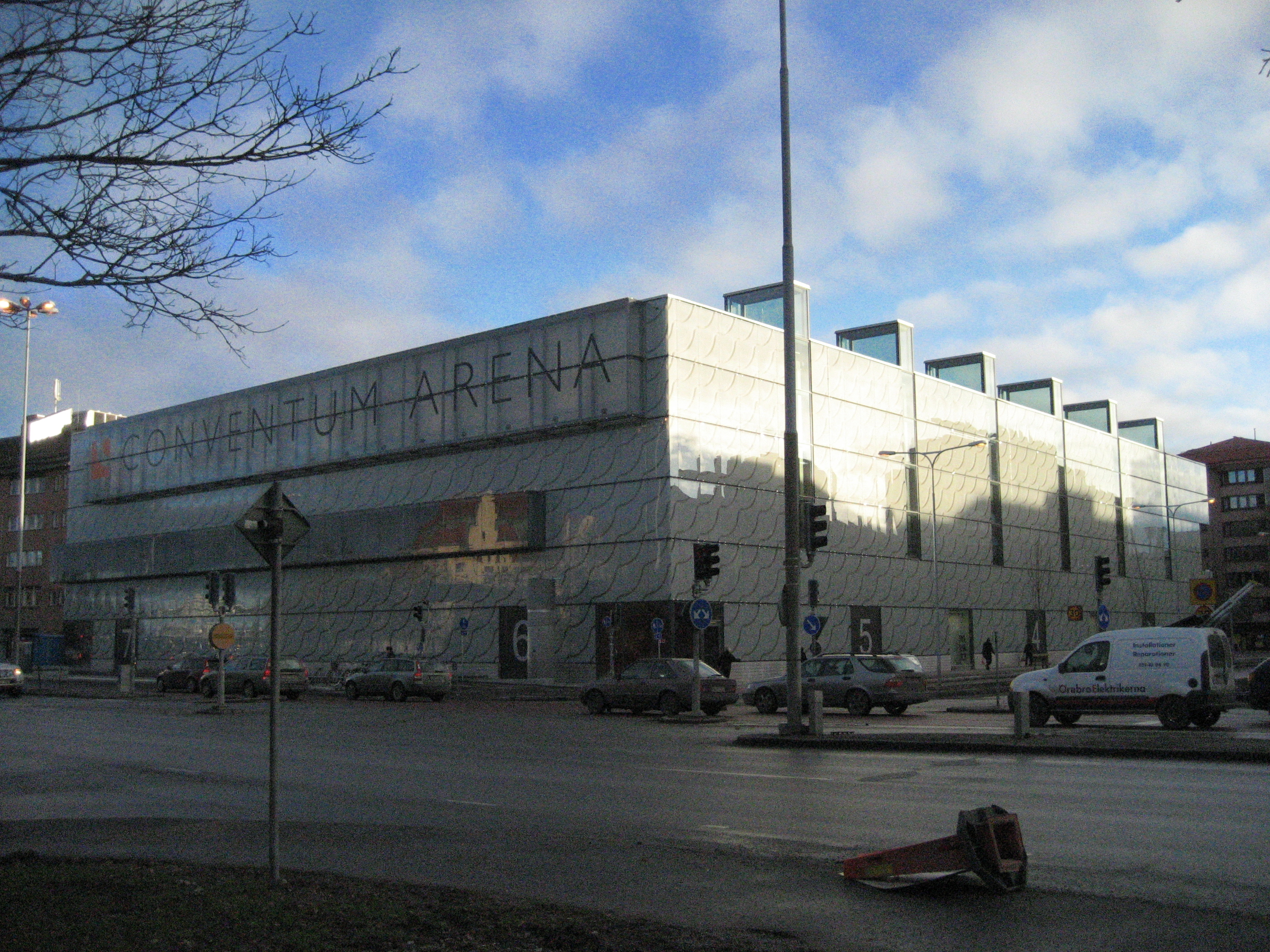
- Conventum Arena
- Interactive map of Conventum Arena
- Location: Örebro, Sweden
- Coordinates: 59°16′9″N 15°12′18″E
- Owner: Kongrexum AB; Conventum

Construction
- Opened: March 2008

Website
- conventum.se

Conventum Arena is a 4,800-square-metre (52,000 sq ft) exhibition centre located in central Örebro, Sweden. The decision on a new exhibition hall in the city was taken around 2005 with construction beginning in January 2007. The arena was completed in March 2008 and was built between Örebro södra station, Scandic Grand Hotel, and Conventum Kongress. The latter, incidentally, the same owners as the Conventum Arena; namely Kongrexum AB, and Conventum. The idea is that these buildings, along with the Medborgarhuset conference centre, to be included in a central convention complex, with the stadium specialising in fairs, conferences, dinners, concerts, and festivals.

The arena hosted the second-chance round of Melodifestivalen 2010, and the fourth semi-final of Melodifestivalen 2015.
