= Jenny Silver =

Swedish singer (born 1974)

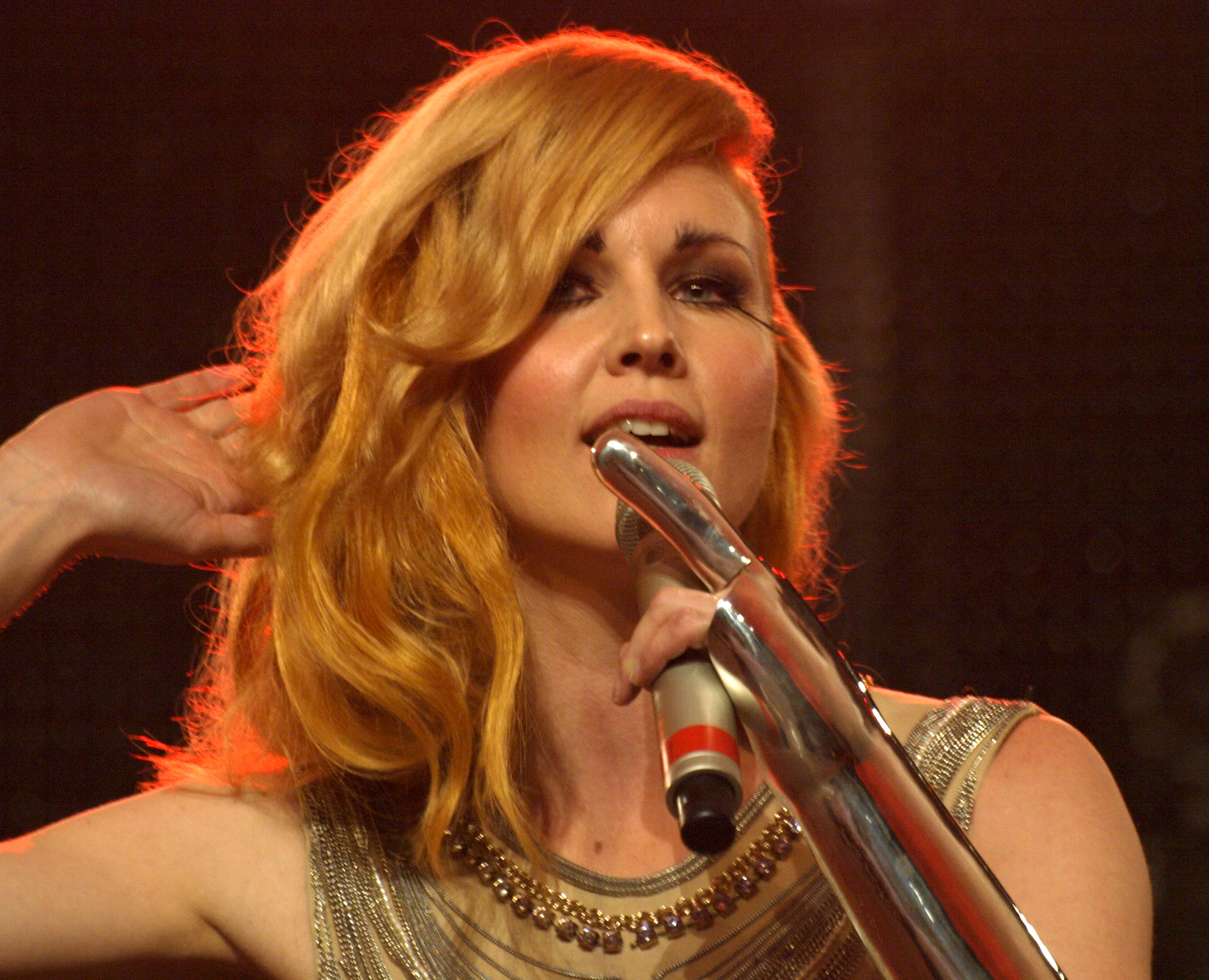
- Jenny Silver (2010)

Background information
- Born: Jenny Maria Öhlund; 22 January 1974 (age 52)
- Origin: Ängelholm, Sweden
- Genres: Pop, electropop, soul, rock
- Occupation: Singer
- Years active: 1991–present
- Website: jennysilver.com

Jenny Maria Öhlund (born 22 January 1974), better known as Jenny Silver, is a Swedish singer.

== Career ==
Jenny Silver started her career in the dance band Candela, which was signed to Bert Karlsson's label, Mariann Grammofon, from 1991 to 1997. Candela made it big in 1994 with a string of hit songs that also reached the Svensktoppen charts. Then known as Jenny Öhlund, she was named the "Queen of Dance Bands" and was named by the media as "the next Lotta Engberg".

Silver has also sung in the rock band Holden, which was signed to Dead Frog Records, and has been in collaborations with Totta Näslund. Releasing her solo album Lyckling in 1997 with Andersson Records, she toured as duet partner with actor Thorsten Flinck, and she also landed the leading roles in the Swedish versions of the musicals, Evita and Jesus Christ Superstar. In 2004 she recorded a cover of the Sex Pistols' classic song, "God Save the Queen", for a compilation album called Rendezvous.

In May 2007, "Ett äventyr" was released; it was a duet with Emrik Karlsson from the funk collective Stonefunkers from Gothenburg. Silver also joined the band, Debbies Wife, a so-called "all-star constellation" group consisting of Jenny Silver, Peppe Carlsson (song), Nikke Ström, Fabian Kallerdahl, Holger Berg, Flamman, Micke Edlund, Johan Håkansson, and guest guitarist Bengan Blomgren. They were produced by Hans Olsson (Universal Poplab, Timo Räisänen) and Peppe Carlsson. Silver has also been seen in other musical theatre roles such as Sarah Brown in Guys and Dolls, which played at the Slagthuset in Malmö during 2007. She was joined on stage by Tommy Körberg. In 2008 she played the rock witch Antonia in the Gothenburg opera play Grymt. On 22 January 2010, Jenny Silver participated in the SVT television show, På Spåret, where she sang the Neil Diamond song, "Sweet Caroline", and Simon & Garfunkel's "El Cóndor Pasa".

In 2011 she was a guest vocalist on the Lustans Lakejer album Elixir, where she, along with Johan Kinde, sang the duet, "Eld & Vatten".

== Melodifestivalen ==
Jenny Silver took part in a few Melodifestivalen competitions in a bid to represent Sweden in the Eurovision Song Contest.

On 6 February 2010, Jenny Silver participated in the first semi-final round of Melodifestivalen 2010 at the Fjällräven Center in Örnsköldsvik with her entry, "A Place to Stay," which only ranked eighth (last) place. However, her song did enter the Sverigetopplistan Singles chart, reaching number 12 based on downloads following her performance.

On 5 February 2011, she took part again in Melodifestivalen 2011 in Luleå with the song, "Something in Your Eyes," making it to the "second chance" round but losing to Love Generation's entry, "Dance Alone."

Jenny returned to Melodifestivalen for its 2013 edition as a member of the group, Swedish House Wives, alongside Pernilla Wahlgren and Hanna Hedlund, in the hope of representing Sweden at the Eurovision Song Contest 2013 once more. Their song ended up in 6th place in the second semi-final and didn't advance to the next round.

== Discography ==
=== Album ===
- Mitt julkort – 1994 (Jenny Öhlund)
- Lycklig – 1997
- Holden – 2003
- Remote Control – 2007 (Manora Records)

=== As guest ===
- Duetterna – 2001 (Totta Näslund)
- Tro hopp och kärlek – 2002 (Åsa Jinder)

=== Singles ===
Title	Year	Peak chart positions	Album
Title	Year	SWE	Album
"Viva! Fernando Garcia"	1994	—	Mitt julkort
"Hemmets jul"	1994	—	Mitt julkort
"Allt eller ingenting"	1997	—	Lycklig
"När natten blir dag"	1997	—	Lycklig
"När livet är som bäst"	1998	—	Lycklig
"Lycklig"	1998	—	Lycklig
"Det vet bara jag" (with Totta Näslund)	2001	—	Non-album singles
"Nu är tid att leva" (with Åsa Jinder & Tommy Nilsson)	2002	—	Non-album singles
"Grand Hotel"	2004	—	Holden
"Ett äventyr" (with Emrik)	2007	—	Remote Control
"A Place to Stay"	2010	12	Non-album singles
"Something in Your Eyes"	2011	59	Non-album singles

== TV ==
Jenny Silver has participated in many television shows such as:

- Fångarna på fortet
- Nyhetsmorgon
- Kockduellen
- Doobidoo
- Sing a long
- Sommarkrysset
- Så ska det låta
- Ponnyakuten.
