= Slagthuset =

Building in Malmö, Sweden

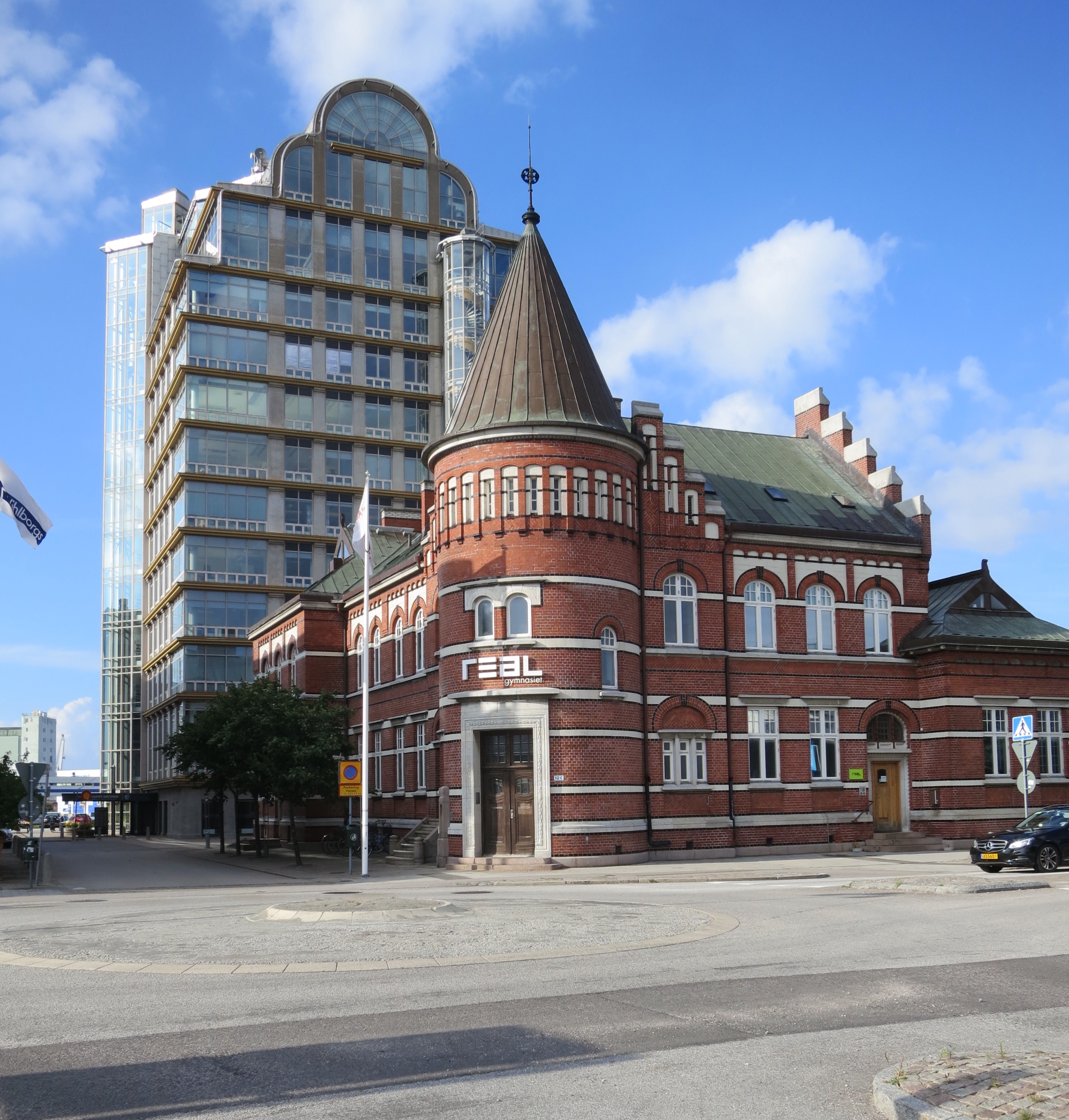
- Slagthuset, in Malmö.
- Interactive map of the Slagthuset area

General information
- Status: Completed
- Type: Commercial offices, hotel, restaurant, theater
- Location: Carlsgatan 12e, 211 20; Malmö, Sweden
- Coordinates: 55°36′41″N 13°00′07″E
- Opened: 1991

Technical details
- Floor count: 13
- Lifts/elevators: 2

Design and construction
- Architect: Ahlsén & Lindström architects

Website
- www.slagthuset.se

Slagthuset was opened at the beginning of the 1990s as an office and entertainment complex in Nyhamnen in Malmö consisting of an office hotel, office premises, theater, discotheque and restaurant.

The name comes from the fact that the main building in the years 1904-69 was a municipal slaughterhouse. The building complex was designed by the city architect in Malmö Salomon Sörensen. The thirteen-storey office building, "Malmö Slagthus", which was completed in 1993, is part of the Slagthus complex. The architect for the high-rise building and the rebuilding of the slaughterhouse was Ahlsén & Lindström architects. Mindpark Malmö City AB runs coworking, meeting and event activities in parts of the high-rise building. The property is owned by Wihlborgs.

In 2021, it was decided that Totte Lundgren, who owns Kulturbolaget and Hans Palm, would have started Nyhamnen Nöje & Events and taken over the operations at Slagthuset after it was officially closed in March 2021.

== Entertainment and events ==
Claes Schmidt and Anita Schmidt ran the business of the whole Slaghthuset on a large scale between 1993 and 2009. Slaghthuset soon became popular and in the meantime counted among the Schmidt's Scandinavia's biggest nightclub, with its 8500 square meters. However, it had problems handling the large amount of loud visitors. Nowadays, the nightclub area is usually smaller. Between 2007 and 2009, artists such as Axwell, Eric Prydz, Fedde le Grand, Benny Benassi, Kate Ryan, Niki Belucci and Petter attended at the Slagthuset several times.

Many famous artists and DJ's have performed at Slagthuset's nightclub, such as David Guetta, Avicii, Laidback Luke, Public Enemy, etc. Under the administration of Ace Event, large music parties were arranged from 2004, such as with Tiesto (2004), the first time a world-leading DJ performed in Malmö, and the audience record-breaking club Ministry of Sound.

In 2009, the business was taken over by Luftkastellet, then in 2012 it was reorganized with the current owner, Joingruppen AB (which also ran restaurants at the nearby Media Evolution City and Studio). Until the summer of 2012, the Öresund group, under the name Slagthuset White administered the nightclub.

Slagthuset hosted Euroclub in 2013 as the Eurovision Song Contest was hosted in Malmö. In connection with that, the pop hit Euphoria was also offered by Gudrun Hauksdottir and others.

On the 1st of November 2013, Slagthuset returned to its original concept, with several larger dance floors and targeting a wider audience with house, RnB and schlager music.

The premises also host larger events such as fairs (including the annual Kulturmässan) and conferences such as Media Evolution City's international The Conference and Nordic Game.

== Pictures ==
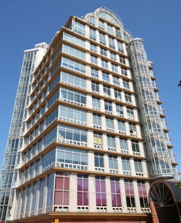
Slagthuset in Malmö, AB Kontorshotell

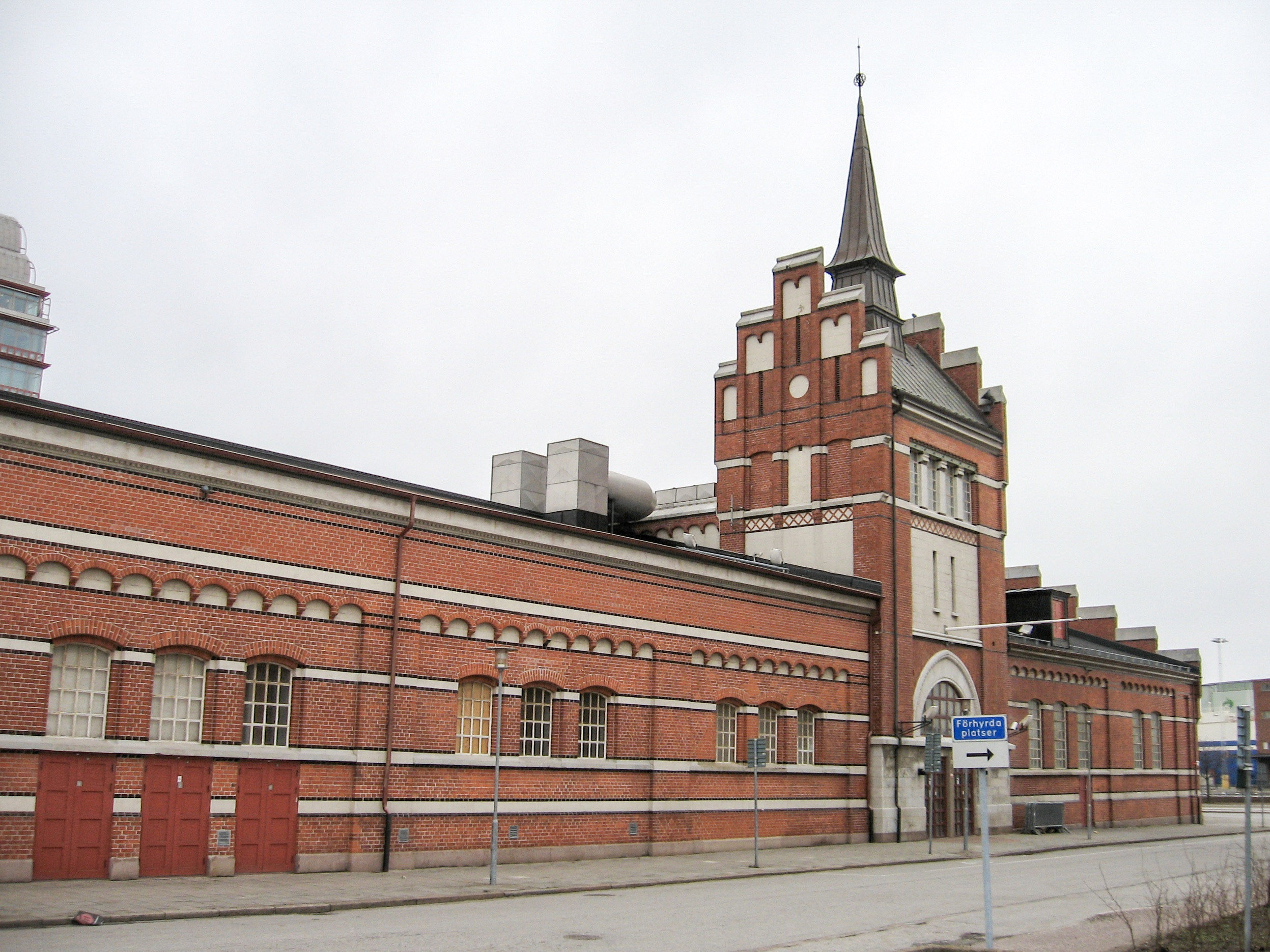
Slagthuset from Navigationsgatan

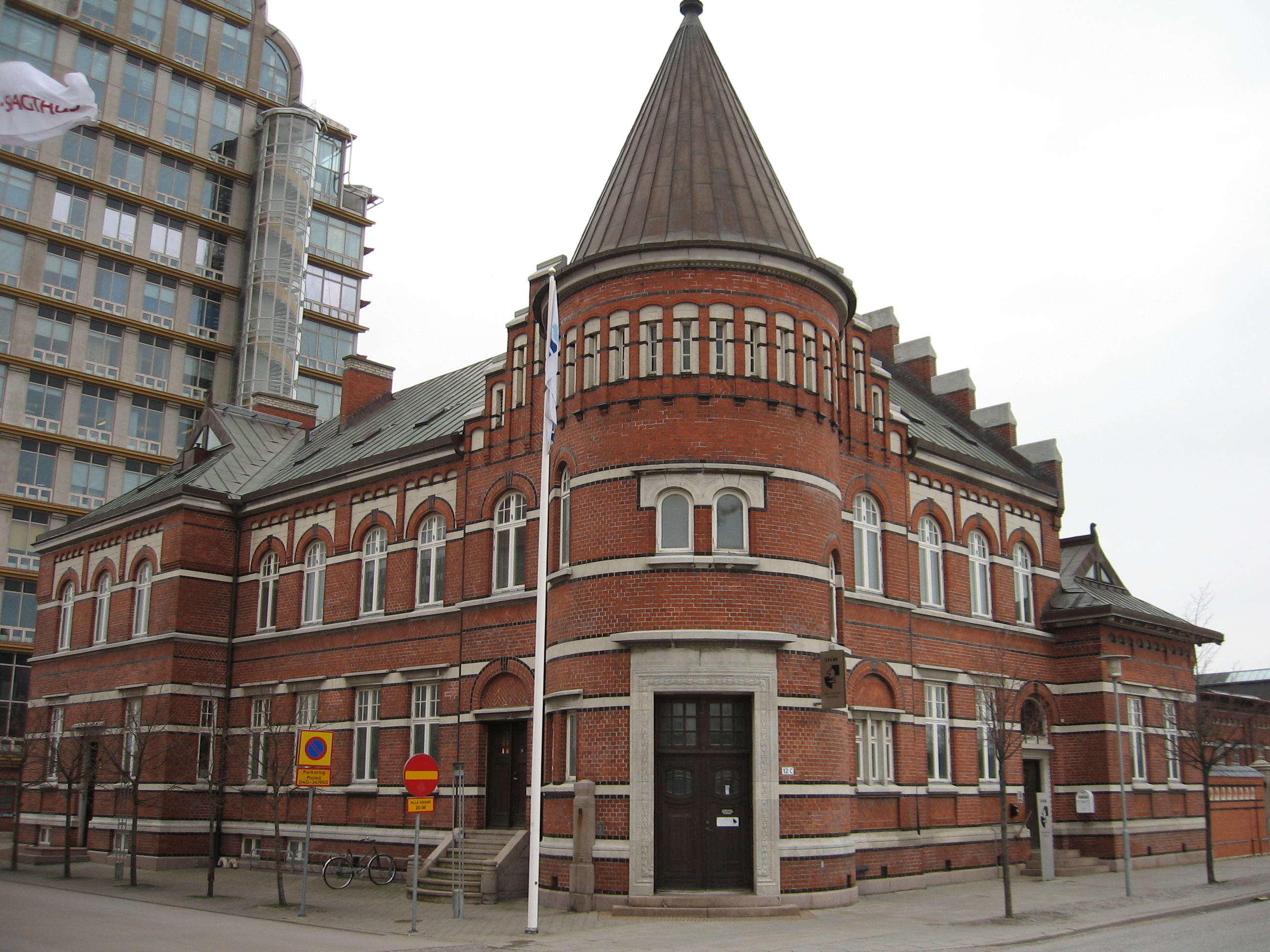
Administration Building

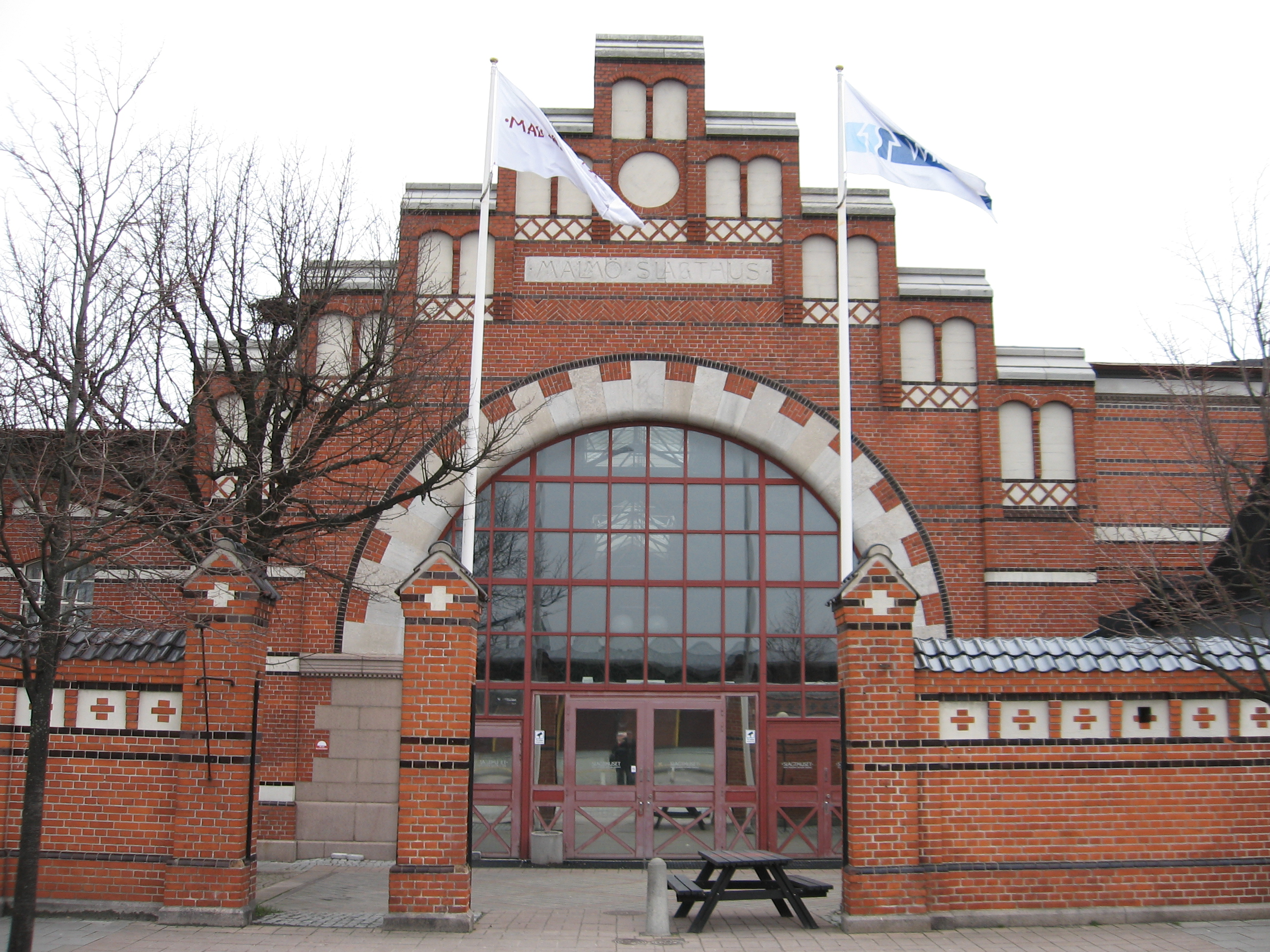
Entrance from Carlsgatan

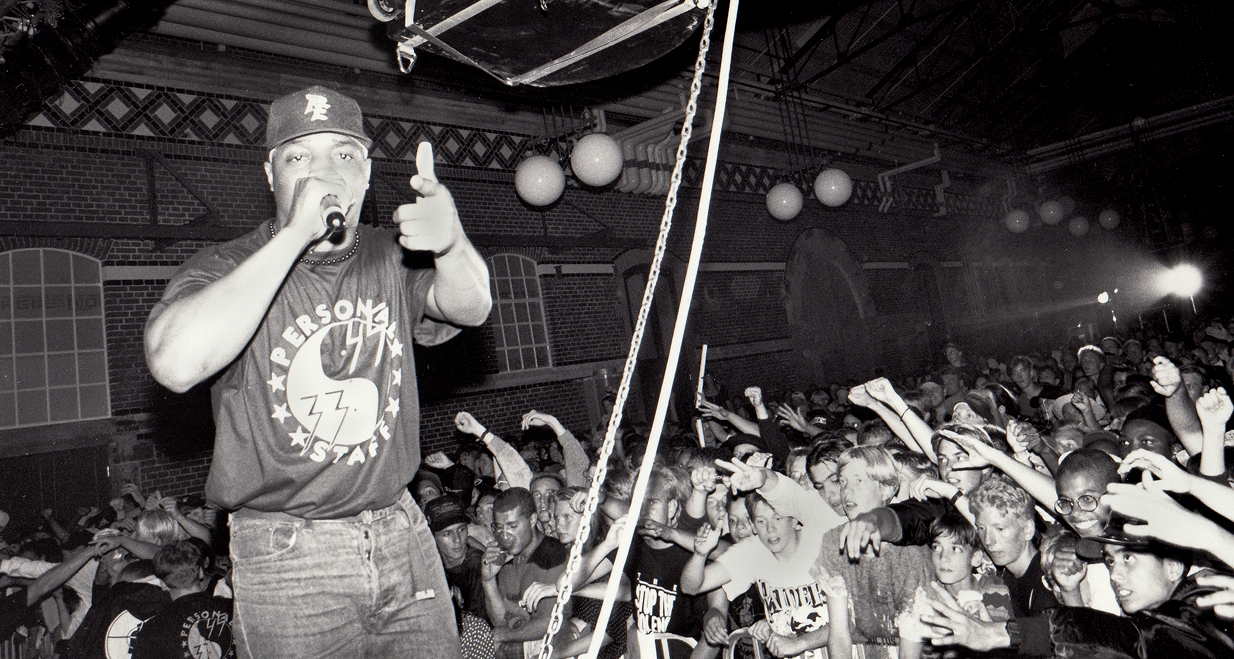
Chuck D, Public Enemy, 1991.
