= Conventum =

Opening of the Conventum in the earliest manuscript. The rubricated initial A begins the account.

The Conventum is a Latin text from around 1030 that narrates the relations between Duke William V of Aquitaine and Lord Hugh IV of Lusignan in the preceding twenty years. The exact nature of the text is a matter of scholarly disagreement. It has been seen as a record of a legal settlement and as a sui generis literary text presaging the chanson de geste. It concerns Hugh's disputes over land and castles with various other barons of Aquitaine and William's failure to help him. The text is written from Hugh's point of view.

== Transmission ==
=== Manuscripts ===
The Conventum is preserved in three manuscripts, none original.

In two manuscripts now in the Bibliothèque nationale in Paris, the Conventum is found alongside the Chronicle of Ademar of Chabannes. The earlier of these, Latin 5927, was probably made within two decades of the events described in the Conventum. It was most likely copied from the original document at the abbey of Saint-Martial of Limoges. The Conventum occupies pages 266–280 and is 341 or 342 lines long. It was copied by a single scribe who used the ampersand ligature for the letter combination et even where it occurs within words.

The later Bibliothèque manuscript, Latin 9767, dates to the 15th century. Its contents are very similar to those of Latin 5927. The Conventum is found at folios 62v–66r. Jules Chavanon argued that it was copied directly from Latin 5927. It is more likely, however, that it was made from a defective copy of the Conventum, since a large section is missing, perhaps corresponding to a missing folio in its exemplar. It is otherwise almost identical to Latin 5927

The third copy, made towards the end of the 11th century, is found at folios 89v–93r of the manuscript Latin F.v.IVN3 in the National Library of Russia in Saint Petersburg. It was probably copied from Latin 5927.

In addition to the three known copies, there is a "rewritten fragment" from the beginning of the Conventum in a 17th-century manuscript from Paris, now Collection Dupuy 822 in the Bibliothèque nationale. The scribe records that it came "out of an old codex", which may indicate a fourth copy once existed.

=== Editions ===
There have been five published editions of the Conventum. The first was by Jean Besly for his Histoire des comtes de Poictou et ducs de Guyenne, published at Paris in 1647. The second was by Philippe Labbe at Paris in 1657, based on Latin 5927. A third edition, based on the two earlier ones, was made by Martin Bouquet for the Recueil des historiens des Gaules et de la France in 1767. The Besly and Bouquet editions are corrupt. A new edition based on Latin 5927 was made by Jane Martindale in 1969. The latest edition, with accompany French and English translations, was published in 1995.

== Date and authorship ==
The Conventum does not contain any dates. Internal evidence suggest that the events it records took place over a period of several years, perhaps as many as fifteen. All the identifiable individuals it mentions were active between about 1010 and 1030. More specifically, the central dispute can be placed between about 1022 and 1028. It began while Gislebert and Gerald I were still bishops of Poitiers and Limoges, respectively, and both bishops appear to have died in 1023. The dispute was resolved with the help of Count William II of Angoulême, who died in March 1028. The Conventum was probably composed around 1030, since it presents both the duke and Hugh as living, while the duke died in 1030 and Hugh in 1032.

The author of the Conventum is anonymous and unidentified. He does not seem to have been highly educated and shows no special interest in ecclesiastical affairs. It is still most likely that he was a cleric, probably a monk and a native of the region where the narrative is set. It is likely that nobody from that time and place but a cleric could demonstrate knowledge of Augustine of Hippo, Isidore of Seville and Jerome, as the author of the Conventum does. Sidney Painter suggests that he was a monk of Notre-Dame de Lusignan. The quality of his Latin precludes his being identified with Ademar, whose Chronicle is transmitted alongside the Conventum in two manuscripts. The author probably worked in Angoulême.

== Language and genre ==
The language of the Conventum is an unpolished Latin, heavily influenced by vernacular Romance. Although some idiosyncrasies of the surviving text may be owed to the scribes, the vernacular influence on spelling and the total inconsistency in the spelling of personal names is probably original. The spelling of names is representative of "spoken usage in the region", with, e.g., the form Ioszfreddus (Geoffrey) preferred over Goszfreddus (Godfrey).

The Conventum is unlike any other text from 11th-century France and its genre has been a matter of debate. It is untitled in all manuscripts. The full form of the title assigned it by Labbe is Conventio inter Willelmum ducem Aquitaniae et Hugonem chiliarchum, revised by Martindale to Conventum inter Guillelmum comitem Aquitanorum et Hugonem chiliarchum. The explicit of the text reads, in capitals, FINIUNT CONVENTI INTER COMITEM ET UGONEM, which led Jean Besly to entitle it Conventum inter comitem et Ugonem. The simple conventional title, Conventum, implies that it is a formal memorandum of settlement between William and Hugh. In her edition, Martindale called it "the unique surviving example from the early eleventh century of a written settlement between man and lord." It is similar to the formal convenientia, but cannot be classified as one. It lacks the formal and authenticating elements of charters and is much longer than a typical convenientia. The terms conventum and convenientia do, however, appear in the text.

The possibility that the Conventum is a piece of historiography is dismissed by George Beech on the grounds that it lacks dates and makes extensive use of direct speech. Over forty percent of the text is direct speech, which is highly unusual in historical writing of the period. Neither does the Conventum resemble hagiography. It is stylistically similar to the Vulgate Bible.

== Synopsis ==
William is introduced as the "count of the Aquitanians". He is never called "duke", the title by which he is usually known today. Hugh is given the unusual title or nickname "chiliarch" (chiliarcum), meaning "leader of a thousand", which Alfred Richard took to indicate that he was the count's commander-in-chief.

William promised Hugh that, on the death of the viscount Boso, he would enfeoff Hugh with Boso's fief ("give Boso's honor to Hugh in commendation"). On the death of Savaric, viscount of Thouars, who had occupied land Hugh held from William, the latter promised to restore it, but secretly gave it to Savaric's brother Ralph. Hugh then agreed to marry Ralph's daughter in exchange for land of equal or greater value, but William persuaded him to break this off. Instead, William offered Hugh the fief and widow of Joscelin of Parthenay. In the end, Hugh received nothing and entered into an open conflict with Ralph, suffering heavy losses.

When Ralph died, Hugh still did not get his usurped land, which William confirmed on Ralph's nephew, Geoffrey. Then, "for the misdeeds which Hugh did on the count's behalf," Geoffrey resumed his uncle's dispute and burnt the fortress of Mouzeil, capturing and maiming several of Hugh's men. More of Hugh's land was occupied and he in turn captured 43 horsemen of Thouars, which he refused to ransom even for 40,000 sous. William, however, forced Hugh to turn the men over to him.

After the death of his uncle Joscelin, Hugh received the castle of Vivonne, to be held jointly with Bishop Ysembert, but in the end the count held back the best lands. William then ordered Hugh to do homage to a Bernard, count of La Marche, for the castle of Civray, which had been held by Hugh's father. Hugh assisted Bernard against the latter's vassal, Aimery of Rançon, who had seized the castle. Hugh suffered heavy losses in this war, but in the end William, who "began to build a fortress called Couhé, but did not finish it for Hugh," made an agreement with Aimery "and did nothing to help Hugh."

Still, Hugh supported William against Aimery after the latter seized the castle of Chizé. He helped William besieged and captured Malval. In the end, William made an agreement with Aimery without consulting Hugh and Hugh received nothing for his help. When Aimery died, a new dispute arose between Hugh and Aimery's son of the same name. The men of the castle of Civray, finding Hugh's lordship unbearable, went over to Bernard, who joined Aimery against Hugh.

With the help of Bishop Gerald, Hugh built a fortress in La Marche, but William had it razed. William then arranged a truce between Bernard and Hugh and summoned Hugh away. While Hugh was attending an assembly at Blaye between William and Count Sancho and while the truce was still in effect, Bernard attacked Confolens, where he did more than 50,000 sous worth of damage and besieged Hugh's wife before retiring.

Hugh then captured the castle of Gençay, which he agreed to rebuild and hold from Count Fulk. When Fulk demanded the fortress, Hugh "put all necessary supplies into the fortress and prepared to hold it against everyone", but in the end agreed to surrender it to William in exchange for another fief on condition that Gençay not be given to Aimery. In the end, Hugh received nothing from the count and so he "broke off faith with the count, saving the count's city and person, in the hearing of all."

This sparked a war between William and Hugh. Many of the fiefs of Hugh's men were seized and Hugh took the castle of Chizé, which he claimed by hereditary right. William then offered Hugh his uncle's former fief. All prior disputes were dropped and Hugh surrendered Chizé. William's son was also party to this agreement, which was put into effect.

The Conventum ends with the words "this is the end of the agreements between the count and Hugh."

== Historical value ==
The Conventum is rooted in historical persons and places and in a definite period. Of the eighteen persons named in the text, sixteen are identifiable historical people. All lived between about 1010 and 1030. Internally, the Conventum is consistent and plausible, which, according to Jane Martindale, "establishes its general value for the historian". Nevertheless, the historical events mentioned in the Conventum—of which George Beech counts thirteen—are not reported in any other sources.

The Conventum is written from the viewpoint of Hugh. Despite this inherent bias, Sidney Painter reads the text in a way highly negative of Hugh, whom he depicts as greedy for land and castles, aggressive and devoted to "bitter and ruthless" warfare, while Duke William blocks his ambitions.

== Bibliography ==
- Bachrach, Bernard S. (1993). Fulk Nerra, the Neo-Roman Consul, 987–1040. University of California Press.
- Barthélemy, Dominique (1995). "Du nouveau sur le Conventum Hugonis?". Bibliothèque de l'École des chartes. 153 (2): 483–495. doi:10.3406/bec.1995.450788.
- Beech, George T.; Chauvin, Yves; Pon, Georges (1995). Le Conventum (vers 1030): Un précurseur aquitain des premières épopées. Geneva: Librairie Droz.
- Beech, George T. (1998). "The Lord/Dependant (Vassal) Relationship: A Case Study from Aquitaine ca. 1030". Journal of Medieval History. 24: 1–30. doi:10.1016/S0304-4181(97)00019-5.
- Beech, George T. (2002). "Narrative Structures and Techniques in the Conventum of Aquitaine ca. 1030". Latin Culture in the Eleventh Century: Proceedings of the Third International Conference on Medieval Latin Studies Cambridge, 9–12 September 1998. Publications of the Journal of Medieval Latin. Vol. 1. Turnhout: Brepols. pp. 39–56. doi:10.1484/M.PJML-EB.3.2814. ISBN 978-2-503-51255-6.
- Kosto, Adam J. (2001). Making Agreements in Medieval Catalonia: Power, Order, and the Written Word, 1000–1200. Cambridge University Press.
- Martindale, Jane (1969). "Conventum inter Guillelmum Aquitanorum comes et Hugonem Chiliarch". The English Historical Review. 84 (332): 528–548. doi:10.1093/ehr/LXXXIV.CCCXXXII.528. JSTOR 562483.
- Martindale, Jane (1997). "Review of Beech, Chauvin & Pon 1995". The English Historical Review. 112 (446): 428–429. doi:10.1093/ehr/CXII.446.428. JSTOR 578192.
- Painter, Sidney (1957). "The Lords of Lusignan in the Eleventh and Twelfth Centuries" (PDF). Speculum. 32 (1): 27–47. doi:10.2307/2849244. JSTOR 2849244. S2CID 161153870.
- Reynolds, Susan; Martindale, Jane; Hyams, Paul; et al., eds. (1988). "Agreement between Count William V of Aquitaine and Hugh IV of Lusignan". Internet Medieval Sourcebook.
- Ricketts, Peter T. (1997). "Review of Beech, Chauvin & Pon 1995". Medium Ævum. 66 (2): 318–319. doi:10.2307/43630082. JSTOR 43630082.
- White, Stephen D. (1997). "Review of Beech, Chauvin & Pon 1995". Speculum. 72 (2): 429–431. doi:10.2307/3040978. JSTOR 3040978.
