= We Can Work It Out (Andreas Johnson song) =

Single by Andreas Johnson
- Released: 2010
- Recorded: 2010
- Genre: Pop
- Songwriter(s): Andreas Johnson (lyrics); Bobby Ljunggren and Marcos Ubeda (music)

Andreas Johnson singles chronology
"Escape" (2009)	"We Can Work It Out" (2010)

We Can Work It Out, is an English-language hit sung by the Swedish singer Andreas Johnson and was recorded in 2010. Lyrics are by Andreas Johnson himself and music was written by Bobby Ljunggren and Marcos Ubeda.

Andreas Johnson participated in the Swedish Melodifestivalen 2010 with "We Can Work It Out" and finished second in the second semi-final in Göransson Arena, Sandviken on 13 February 2010. The song qualified for the final in Stockholm.

== Charts ==
Chart (2010)	Peak position	−2	Swedish Singles Chart	9
