= You're Making Me Hot-Hot-Hot =

Single by Linda Pritchard
- Released: February 2010
- Recorded: 2009
- Genre: Pop; Dance
- Label: Universal Sweden
- Songwriters: Tobias Lundgren; Johan Fransson; Tim Larsson

Linda Pritchard singles chronology
"Staying Alive" (2009)	"You're Making Me Hot-Hot-Hot" (2010)	"Miracle" (2010)

Music video
- "You're Making Me Hot-Hot-Hot" on YouTube

" You're Making Me Hot-Hot-Hot" is a successful English language single by Swedish singer Linda Pritchard. The song took part in the Melodifestivalen 2010 in a bid to represent Sweden in the Eurovision Song Contest 2010.

On 14 October 2009 SVT had revealed the first 27 entries which the jury had selected, of a total of 2860 submissions to the contest. However, on 15 October 2009, it was announced that the song "Never Heard of Him", composed by Figge Boström and Anna Engh, was disqualified after it appeared briefly on Figge Boström's MySpace page. The song was replaced on 20 October 2009 by this song "You're Making Me Hot-Hot-Hot", written by Tobias Lundgren, Johan Fransson and Tim Larsson.

Pritchard performed the song live on the first semi-final held on 6 February 2010 in Fjällräven Center, Örnsköldsvik in a strong dance number, joined on stage by six female backing dancers, with dancing typically being an integral part of her stage performance. The song however did not qualify for the finals coming 5th of 8 acts in the first semi-final.

== Chart performance ==
Despite the fact that the song didn't pass through to the finals, it proved popular with the public and was released on Universal Sweden reaching #8 on the Sverigetopplistan, the official Swedish Singles Chart on the chart dated 26 February 2010. It stayed a total of 6 weeks on the chart.

Year (2010)	Top position
Swedish Singles Chart	8
