= Linda Pritchard =

Swedish singer and professional dancer (born 1983)

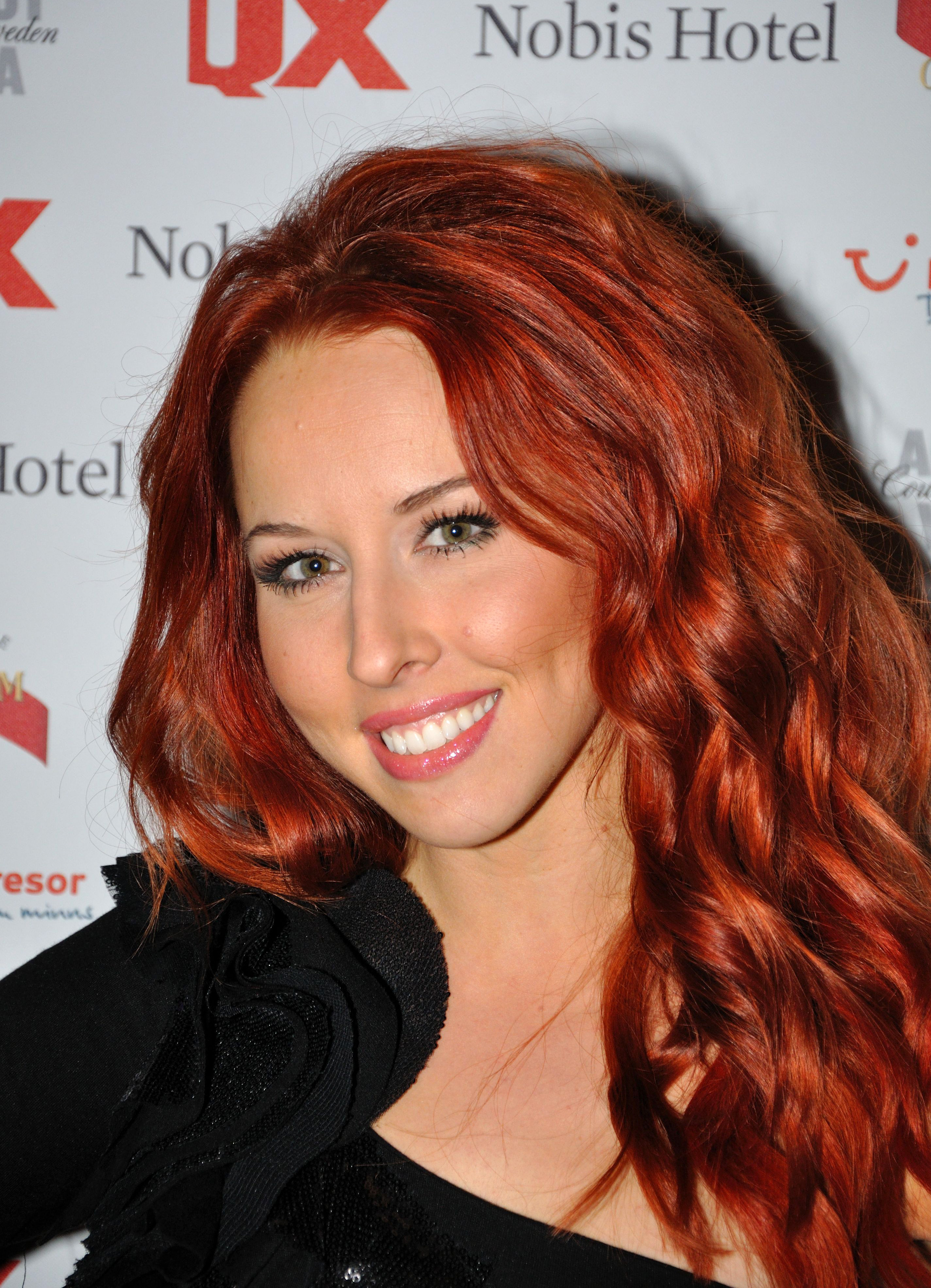

Background information
- Born: Linda Norrgård Pritchard; 19 May 1983 (age 43)
- Origin: Vällingby, Sweden
- Genres: Soul, R&B, pop
- Occupation: Singer
- Years active: 2008–present
- Label: Universal Music
- Website: Official Website

Linda Norrgård Pritchard (born 19 May 1983) is a Swedish artist, who has worked with Magnus Uggla and Ace of Base. As a student she attended the Adolf Fredrik's Music School in Stockholm. She participated in Idol 2008 where she got to the qualifying round but was then eliminated, although she was considered one of the favourites. During the summer of 2009, Pritchard participated in Allsång på Skansen as a dancer for Magnus Uggla and she also choreographed for Ace of Base. Pritchard also accompanied Ugglas on his revue tour. Pritchard's first single "Fast Car", originally recorded by Tracy Chapman, was included in the compilation album Absolute Music 61. She had previously sung backing vocals for Celine Dion and Britney Spears. In 2019, Pritchard appeared on stage at the Eurovision Song Contest in Tel Aviv, Israel as one of the backing singers for the United Kingdom entry performed by Michael Rice.

== Melodifestivalen ==
Pritchard took part in Melodifestivalen 2006, as a backup singer for Velvet, and Melodifestivalen 2008 as the opening act and she participated in Melodifestivalen 2010 with the song "You're Making Me Hot-Hot-Hot", and finished in fifth place in the first semi-final that took place in Örnsköldsvik. She also entered Melodifestivalen 2011 with the song "Alive", which came third during the fourth semi-final. However she was knocked out by The Moniker.

== Alive ==
Her first album, Alive, including the singles "You're Making Me Hot-Hot-Hot", "Miracle", and "Alive", was released on 9 March 2011, and entered the Swedish charts at No. 21. It spent three weeks in the album charts, peaking at No. 21 on its first week.

== Discography ==
=== Albums ===
- Alive (2011)
1. "Glorious"
2. "Miracle"
3. "Alive"
4. "Not Even Hello"
5. "Dance Your Tears Away"
6. "Erase & Rewind"
7. "Rise Again"
8. "Alienized"
9. "Satellite"
10. "Crying In The Rain"
11. "Stuck In A Riddle"
12. "On Time"
13. "You're Making Me Hot-Hot-Hot" (bonus track)

=== Singles ===
Year	Single	Peak chart positions	Certification	Album
Year	Single	SWE	Certification	Album
2009	"Fast Car"	–		
2009	"Staying Alive"	–		
2010	"You're Making Me Hot-Hot-Hot"	8		
2010	"Miracle"	19		
2011	"Alive"	31		
2011	"Wicked Game"	–		
2014	"Drummer Boy"	–		
