= Stop (Sibel Redžep song) =

Single by Sibel Redžep
- A-side: "Stop"
- B-side: "Stop (karaoke version)"
- Released: 2010
- Genre: pop
- Label: M&L Records
- Songwriter(s): Mikaela Stenström, Dimitri Stassos

Sibel Redžep singles chronology
"I'm Sorry" (2009)	"Stop" (2010)	"The Fall" (2010)

Stop! is a song written by Mikaela Stenström och Dimitri Stassos, and performed by Sibel Redžep at Melodifestivalen 2010. The song participated in the semifinal inside the Malmö Arena, but didn't make it further. It as also released as a single the same year. and peaked at 27th position at the Swedish singles chart.

== Chart positions ==
Chart (2010)	Peak position
Sweden	27
