= Pauline Kamusewu =

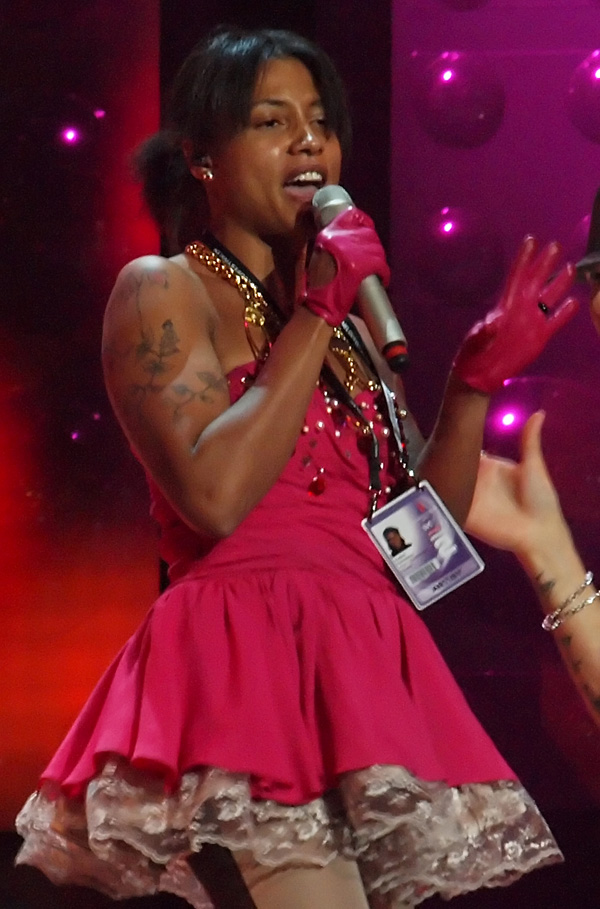
- Pauline performing at Melodifestivalen 2010

Background information
- Also known as: Pauline
- Born: Pauline Benadette Kamusewu Olofsson; 3 November 1982 (age 43); Harare, Zimbabwe
- Origin: Malmö/Älmhult, Sweden
- Genres: Soul, R&B
- Occupation: Singer
- Years active: 2003–present
- Labels: Tri-Sound
- Website: Myspace

Pauline Kamusewu, also known as just Pauline (born 3 November 1982) is a Swedish soul singer-songwriter of Zimbabwean and Italian descent. Born Pauline Kamusewu in 1982 in Zimbabwe to an Italian father and a Zimbabwean mother, she moved to Sweden when she was three years old. In 2003 she won the Rockbjörnen award for Best Swedish Newcomer. She competed in the second heat of Melodifestivalen 2010 in Sandviken with the song Sucker for Love but was knocked out in the duels by Crucified Barbara.

== Discography ==
=== Albums ===
Title	Details	Peak chart positions
Title	Details	SWE
Candy Rain	Released: 5 September 2003; Label: Sonet / Universal Music; Format: CD	12
I Never Said I Was an Angel	Released: 12 March 2009; Label: Tri-Sound; Format: CD	26

=== Singles ===
Title	Year	Peak chart positions	Album
Title	Year	SWE	Album
"Running Out of Gaz"	2003	22	Candy Rain
"Answer"	2003	20	Candy Rain
"I Never Said I Was an Angel"	2008	9	I Never Said I Was an Angel
"Loving You"	2008	—	I Never Said I Was an Angel
"Give Me a Call"	2008	10	I Never Said I Was an Angel
"Sucker for Love"	2010	11	I Never Said I Was an Angel

Featured on

- 2001: "Tonårstankar" – Lilleman featuring Pauline and Gonza
- 2009: "Intill dig" – Bo Kaspers Orkester featuring Pauline
- 2009: "Intill dig" – Bo Kaspers Orkester featuring Pauline
- 2010: "Six Years" – Tingsek featuring Pauline
- 2011: "Little Did I Know" – Swingfly featuring Pauline and Christoffer Hiding
