= Keep On Walking (Salem Al Fakir song) =

2010 single by Salem Al Fakir

Single by Salem Al Fakir

from the album Ignore This
- Released: February 2010
- Recorded: 2010
- Genre: Pop
- Length: 3:02
- Label: EMI Music Sweden AB under exclusive licence from Salem Al Fakir Music AB
- Songwriter(s): Salem Al Fakir

Music video
- "Keep on Walking" on YouTube

"Keep On Walking" is a Swedish-English language hit sung by the Swedish singer Salem Al Fakir recorded in 2010. Both lyrics and music were written by Salem Al Fakir himself.

He participated in the Swedish Melodifestivalen 2010 with "Keep On Walking" and finished first in the first semi-final in Örnsköldsvik on February 6, 2010. The song was picked as a "wildcard finalist", progressing to the final in Stockholm on March 13, 2010, where it competed to represent Sweden in the Eurovision Song Contest 2010, held in Oslo, Norway.

Salem Al Fakir took part in the Melodifestivalen final on Saturday, March 13, 2010, at Globe Arena in Stockholm, in a bid to represent Sweden in Eurovision Song Contest 2010, held in Oslo, Norway. He came in 2nd place overall as a runner up to the winning song by "This is My Life" by Anna Bergendahl with a total of 183 points, to Bergendahl's 214.

But Al Fakir received two sets of 12 points from the French and Norwegian juries and 10 points from the Russian and Serbian judges making him the clear international choice. He also got the maximum 12 points from Stockholm juries and sets of 10 points from Luleå, Umeå and Malmö juries and 17.1% (299,746 votes) from the televoting public to Bergendahl's 20.8% (363,546 votes).

== Charts ==
=== Weekly charts ===
Weekly chart performance for "Keep On Walking"
Chart (2010)	Peak position
Sweden (Sverigetopplistan)	3

=== Year-end charts ===
Year-end chart performance for "Keep On Walking"
Chart (2010)	Position
Sweden (Sverigetopplistan)	29
