= I Did It for Love (Jessica Andersson song) =

Single by Jessica Andersson
- A-side: "I Did It for Love"
- B-side: "I Did It for Love" (karaoke version)
- Released: February 2010
- Genre: pop
- Label: M&L Records
- Songwriter(s): Kristian Wejshag; Lars "Dille" Diedricson

Jessica Andersson singles chronology
"Wake Up" (2009)	"I Did It for Love" (2010)	"Precis där du hör hemma" (2011)

I Did It For Love is a song written by Kristian Wejshag and Lars "Dille" Diedricson and performed by Jessica Andersson.

The song was selected as one of the competing songs in Melodifestivalen 2010, a song competition to represent Sweden at the Eurovision Song Contest. The song came third in the first semi-final on 6 February 2010 and processed to the second chance round where it knocked out Alcazar's song "Headlines" and Kalle Moreaus and Orsa spelmän's "Underbart", progressing to the final on 13 March 2010, where is placed 8th.

The single was released in February 2010 and peaked at number 13 on the Swedish Singles Chart. The song was named the "2010 Svensktoppen song of the year".

== Track listing ==
CD single

1. "I Did It for Love"
2. "I Did It for Love" (Karaoke Version)

== Charts ==
Chart (2010)	Peak position
Sweden (Sverigetopplistan)	13

== Release history ==
Region	Release Date	Format	Label	Catalogue
Sweden	February 2010	CD single	M&L Records	MLCDS0147
