= A Place to Stay =

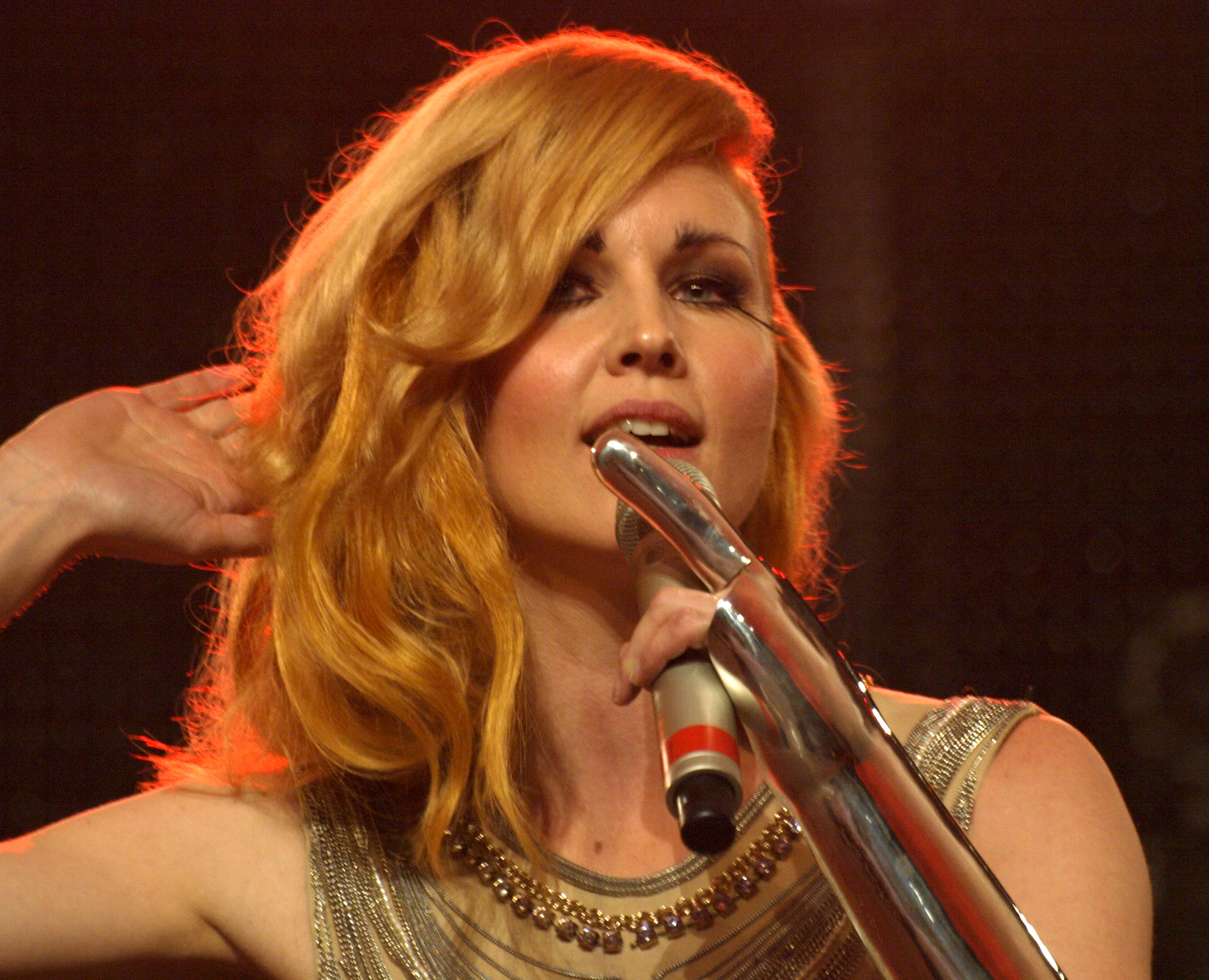
- Jenny Silver at Stockholm Pride 2010

Single by Jenny Silver
- Released: 2010
- Songwriter: Torben Hedlund

Jenny Silver singles chronology
"A Place to Stay" (2010)	"Something in Your Eyes" (2011)

"A Place to Stay" is a song written by Torben Hedlund. Performed by Jenny Silver in the first semifinal of Melodifestivalen 2010 in Örnsköldsvik, the song didn't make it further.

== Chart positions ==
Chart (2010)	Peak position
Sweden	12
