= Give Me a Call (song) =

Single by Pauline Kamusewu

from the album I Never Said I Was An Angel
- Released: 2009
- Genre: soul pop
- Length: 3:29
- Label: Bonnier Music
- Songwriter(s): Pauline Kamusewu; Johan "Jones" Wetterberg; Michel Zitron
- Producer(s): Johan Wetterberg; Michel Zitron

Pauline Kamusewu singles chronology
"Loving You" (2008)	"Give Me a Call" (2009)	"Sucker for Love" (2010)

Give Me a Call is a song written by Pauline Kamusewu, Johan Wetterberg och Michel Zitron, and recorded by Pauline Kamusewu on her 2009 album I Never Said I Was An Angel.

The song charted at Svensktoppen for two weeks. before leaving chart.

== Charts ==
=== Weekly charts ===
Chart (2009)	Peak position
Norway (VG-lista)	9
Sweden (Sverigetopplistan)	10

=== Year-end charts ===
Chart (2009)	Position
Sweden (Sverigetopplistan)	86
