= Jag vill om du vågar =

Single by Pernilla Wahlgren
- A-side: "Jag vill om du vågar"
- B-side: "Jag vill om du vågar" (karaoke version)
- Released: March 2010
- Genre: schlager
- Label: M&L Records
- Songwriters: Pontus Assarsson, Jörgen Ringqvist (lyrics and music), Daniel Barkman (lyrics)

"Jag vill om du vågar" is a song written by Pontus Assarsson, Jörgen Ringqvist (lyrics and music) and Daniel Barkman (lyrics), and performed by Pernilla Wahlgren at Melodifestivalen 2010. Participating in the fourth semifinal in Malmö, it ended up in third place, reaching Andra chansen. Once there it defeated the songs by Pain of Salvation and Crucified Barbara, and reached the final in the Stockholm Globe Arena on 13 March 2010. It subsequently ended up in tenth and final place, scoring 12 points.

== Charts ==
Chart (2010)	Peak position
Sweden (Sverigetopplistan	18
