= Hanna Lindblad =

Swedish singer

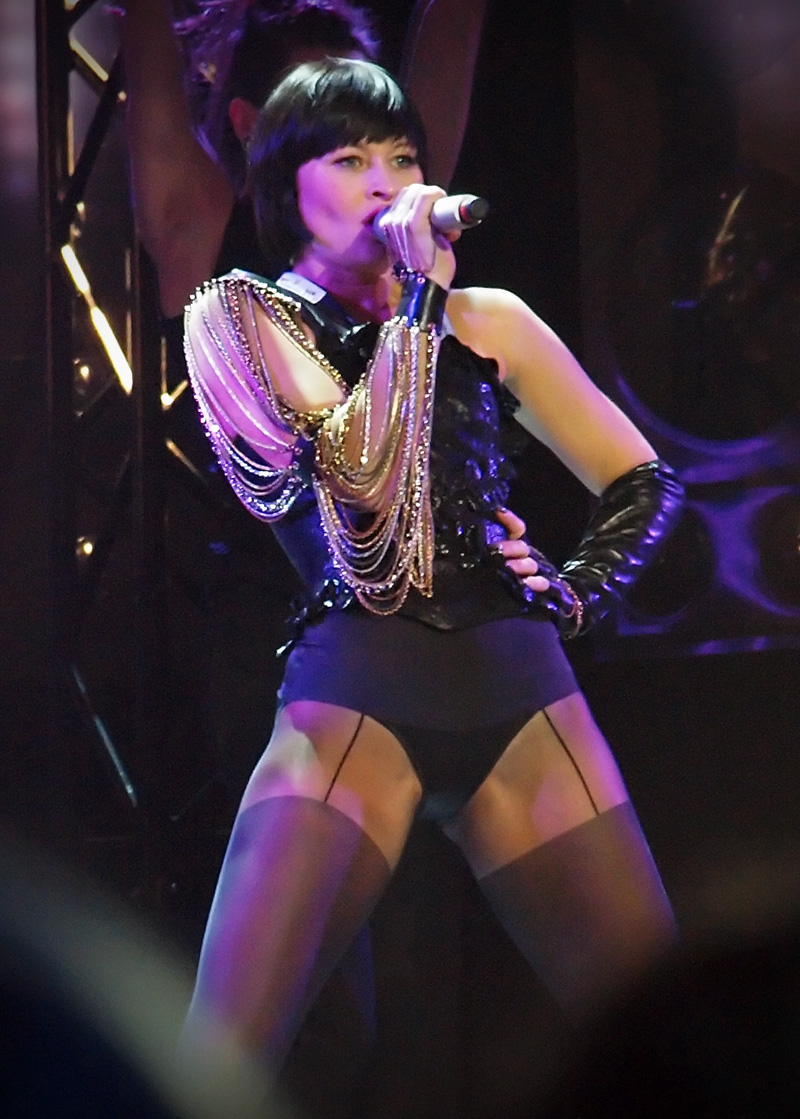
- Lindblad during Melodifestivalen 2010

Background information
- Born: 13 October 1980 (age 45); Motala, Sweden
- Genres: Pop, musical theatre
- Occupation: Singer
- Years active: 2000–present

Hanna Lindblad (born 13 October 1980 in Motala) is a Swedish singer. After studying music at Hammar High School in Sandviken, Lindblad went to Balettakademien in Gothenburg, from which she graduated in 2000.

She was nominated for a Guldmasken for her role in "Saturday Night Fever". She participated in the second Semi-Final of Melodifestivalen 2010 in Sandviken where she achieved fifth place with her song Manipulated. She participated in the fourth Semi-Final of Melodifestivalen 2012 with the song "Goosebumps".

== Stage productions ==
- A Hollywood Tribute SHOWBUSINESS at Grand Hôtel and Oscarsteatern
- Saturday Night Fever
- Singin' in the Rain at Oscarsteatern
- A Chorus Line
- Sound of Music
- Skönheten och Odjuret
- Flash Dance at Chinateatern

== Television shows ==
- Sing a long (2007)
- Så ska det låta (2007)
- Doobidoo (2008)
- Doobidoo (2009)
- Melodifestivalen 2010
- Melodifestivalen 2012

== Other ==
- Rhapsody in Rock (2007)
