= Sucker for Love (song) =

Single by Pauline Kamusewu
- Released: 2010
- Genre: Soul pop
- Songwriters: Pauline Kamusewu; Fredrik "Fredro" Ödesjö; Andreas Levander; Johan "Jones" Wetterberg.

Pauline Kamusewu singles chronology
"Give Me a Call" (2009)	"Sucker for Love" (2010)

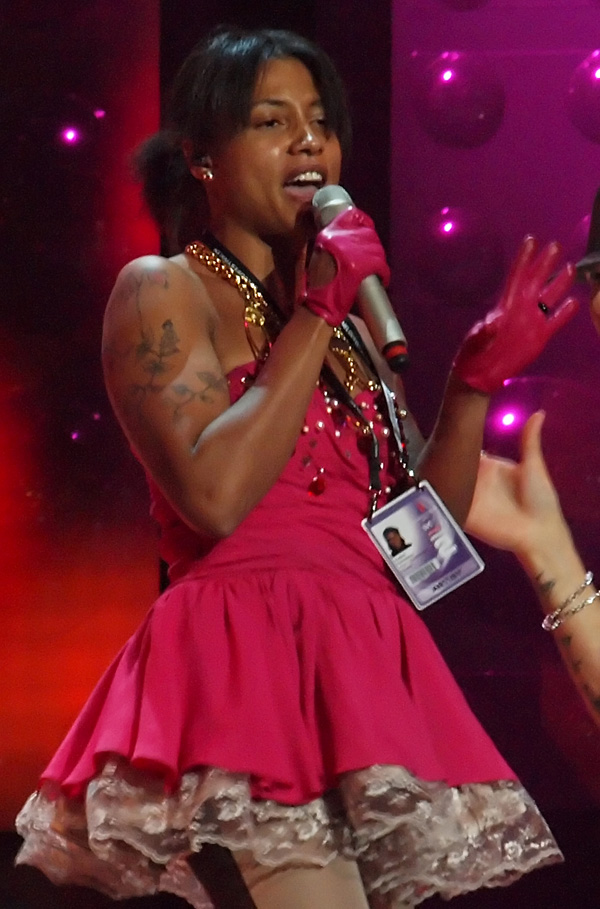
Pauline Kamusewu during Melodifestivalen 2010.

"Sucker for Love" is a song by Swedish singer Pauline Kamusewu, released as a single in 2010. It was written by Kamusewu, Fredrik "Fredro" Ödesjö, Andreas Levander and Johan "Jones" Wetterberg, and performed by Kamusewu at Melodifestivalen 2010 during the second semifinal in Sandviken where it made it further to Andra chansen before getting knocked out.

The song charted at Svensktoppen for one week. before leaving chart.

During Melodifestivalen 2012 the song appeared at "Tredje chansen".

== Charts ==
Chart (2010)	Peak position
Sweden (Sverigetopplistan)	11
