= Highlights (band) =

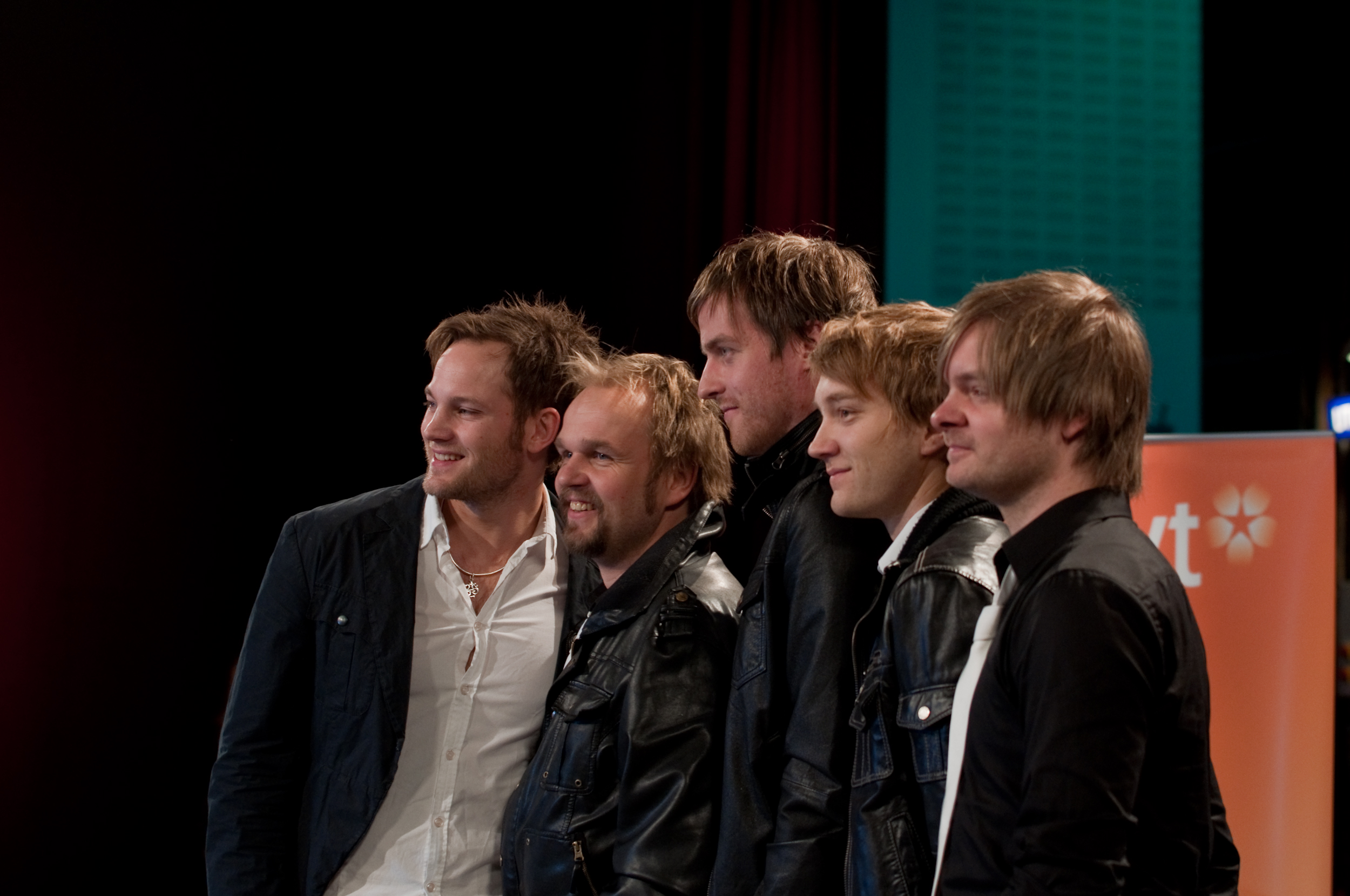
- Highlights

Background information
- Origin: Sweden
- Genres: Modern dansband music
- Years active: 2004-

Highlights is a dansband from Sweden, established in 2004 by Andreas Wistrand, who had participated at Fame Factory, together with Henrik Sethsson.

In 2005, the band released its debut album, which received five plus by Aftonbladet. The band won the Guldklaven award in 2006, in the category Newcomer of the year. In 2007 the single "Varje liten droppe regn" charted at Sverigetoppen for 24 weeks.

In 2007, Andreas Wistrand recorded the Christmas single "Du är det enda jag vill ha" with Sandra Oxenryd, and the song was written by Thomas G:son, Henrik Sethsson and Ulf Georgsson. The band participated at Dansbandskampen 2008 and 2009.

In 2010, the band participated at Melodifestivalen together with MiSt, performing the song Come and Get Me Now, (written by Mia Terngård and Stefan Lebert), in which they were knocked out, finishing in 7th place.

== Members ==
- Michael Mårtensson (vocals)
- Tommy Gustafsson (drums)
- Christian Lindholm (keyboards)
- Rickard Johanssons (guitar)

== Discography ==
=== Albums ===
- 2005: Highlights
- 2008: Vi Lever Om Natten
- 2012: Limited Edition Vol.1
- 2014: När Vi Är Tillsammans

=== Singles ===
- 2008: Här Är Mitt Liv
- 2009: The Best Part of Me
- 2010: Come And Get Me Now (feat.MiSt)
- 2012: Tills Natten Blir Dag
- 2012: Tro På Mig
- 2017: Tell It To My Heart ( Taylor Dayne cover)

== Svensktoppen songs ==
=== Svensktoppen test (failed to enter chart) ===
- Jag stannar inatt – 2005
