= Lovestoned (band) =

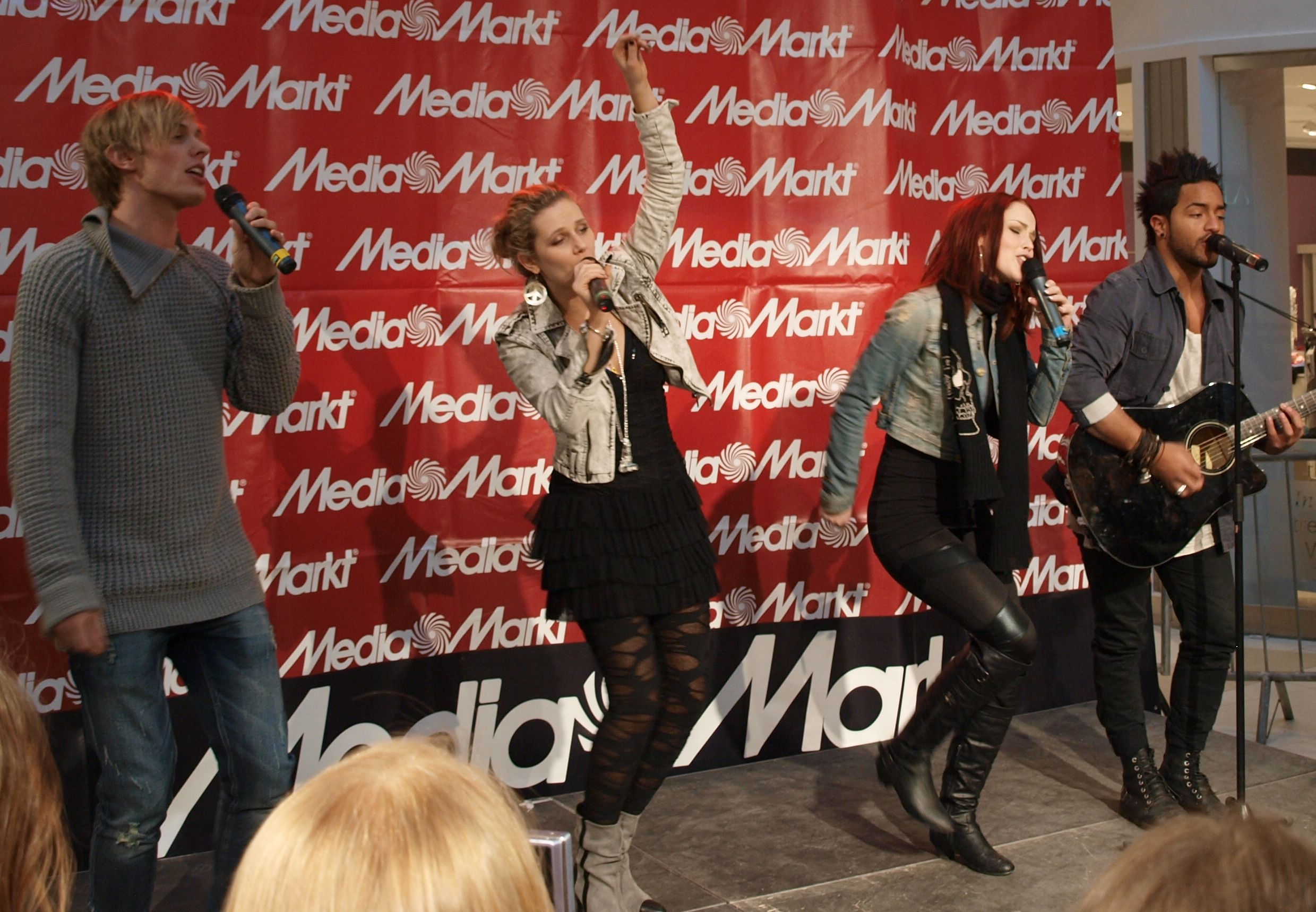

Background information
- Origin: Stockholm, Sweden
- Genres: Pop music
- Years active: 2009–present
- Members: Pär Stenhammar; Robert Kragh; Elena Boyadjyeva; Emilie Fjällström
- Website: www.lovestoned-music.com

Lovestoned is a German-Swedish pop band from Stockholm. They took part in the 2010 Melodifestivalen.

== Singles ==
Year	Song	Peak chart positions	
Year	Song	GER	SWE
2009	"Rising Girl"	54	—
2010	"Thursdays"	—	21
2010	"I Know Nothing"	—	—
