= Sweden in the Eurovision Song Contest 2008 =

- Eurovision Song Contest 2008
- Participating broadcaster: Sveriges Television (SVT)
- Country: Sweden
- Selection process: Melodifestivalen 2008
- Selection date: 15 March 2008

Competing entry
- Song: "Hero"
- Artist: Charlotte Perrelli
- Songwriters: Bobby Ljunggren; Fredrik Kempe

Placement
- Semi-final result: Qualified (12th, 54 points)
- Final result: 18th, 47 points

Participation chronology

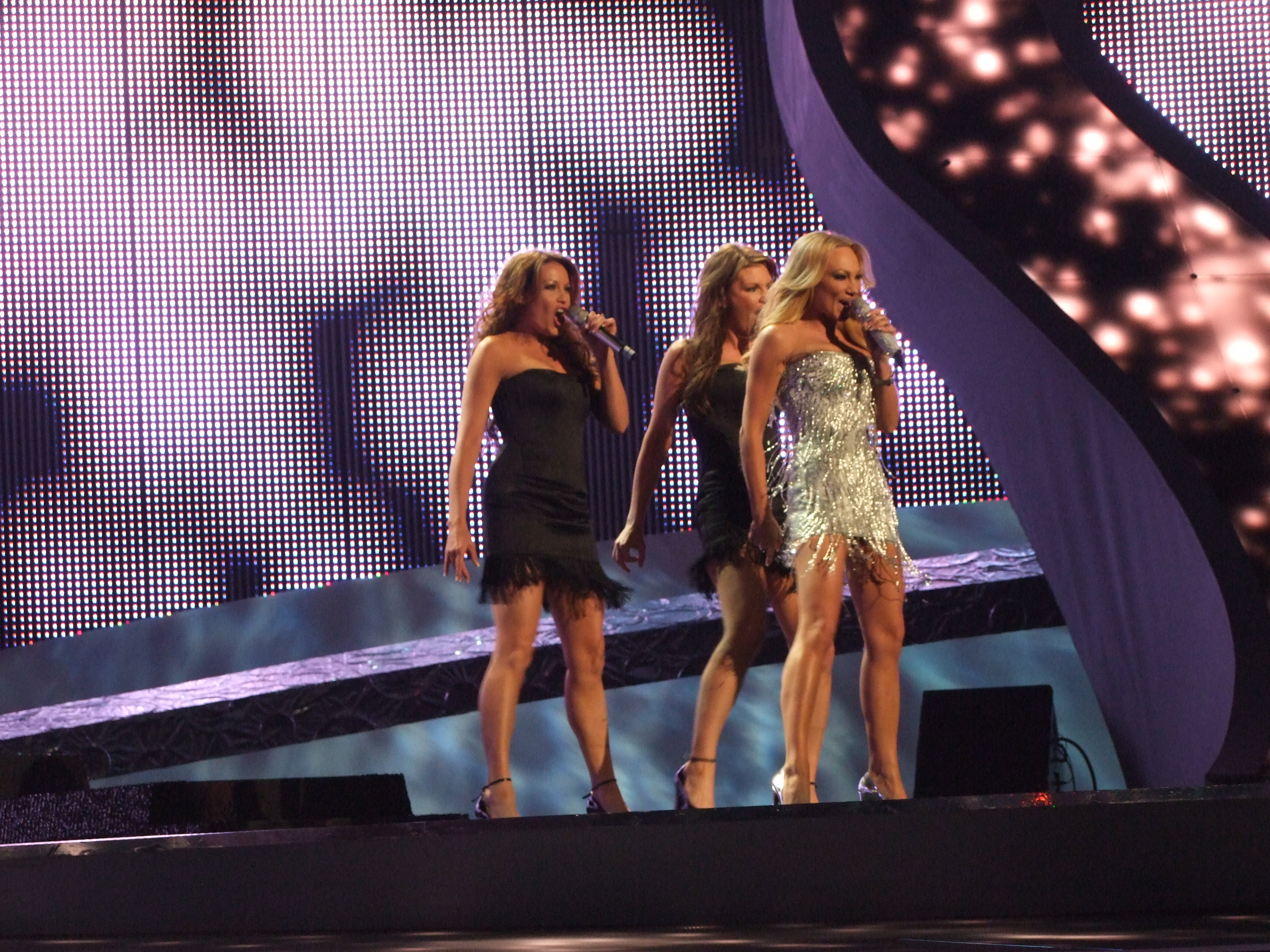
Charlotte Perrelli and backup singers performing "Hero" at the 2nd semi-final of the Eurovision Song Contest 2008.

Sweden was represented at the Eurovision Song Contest 2008 with the song "Hero", written by Fredrik Kempe and Bobby Ljunggren, and performed by Charlotte Perrelli. The Swedish participating broadcaster, Sveriges Television (SVT), selected its entry through Melodifestivalen 2008. Perrelli had previously won both contest in 1999.

A record of 3,489 entries were submitted to SVT, and 28 were chosen to compete. They were completed with 4 wildcards in the end of December. Melodifestivalen was also this year held on Saturdays, starting with the first of the four heats on 9 February and ending with a final on 15 March. It was the last of the year's national selections, as the official draw for Eurovision was held on 17 March. Four songs progressed from each heat, two to the final and two to the second chance round, where the songs were competing in a knock-out round to gain the last two places in the final. The final was won by Charlotte Perrelli with the song "Hero". Sanna Nielsen, who was the favourite of televoters, came second.

Charlotte Perrelli competed in the second semi-final on 22 May. She did not finish among the ten best in the televoting, but thanks to the new rule that the last finalist will be chosen by the back-up juries, she took the final ticket at the expense of Macedonia. The placement in the televoting was 12th, 7 points after Macedonia and 2 points after Bulgaria. She was drawn into the 15th spot in the final. Although being one of the heavy favorites before the final, Sweden did not finish higher than 18th, receiving only 47 points.

== Before Eurovision ==
=== Melodifestivalen 2008 ===
Melodifestivalen 2008 was the 47th Melodifestivalen, and the selection process for the 48th song to represent Sweden at the Eurovision Song Contest. 32 competing songs were split up into four heats with eight participants in each. The heats were held between 9 February and 1 March 2008 and at each, the two top placing songs went to the final, while the third and fourth place songs went to the Andra Chansen (Second Chance round). At the Andra Chansen, held on 8 March 2008, the eight songs paired off in two rounds with the two winners at the end of the night qualifying for the final. The final was held on 15 March 2008 and included the eight songs from the semi-finals along with the two from the Andra Chansen to make ten songs in all. The winner and selected entrant for the Eurovision Song Contest was then chosen by the 11 regional juries of Sweden, along with public televoting.

It was hosted by Kristian Luuk, who also hosted the 2007 event. Luuk was assisted by Björn Gustafsson and Nour El-Refai.

==== Heats and Second Chance round ====
- The first heat took place on 9 February 2008 at the Scandinavium in Gothenburg. "Thank You" performed by Amy Diamond and "I Love Europe" performed by Christer Sjögren qualified directly to the final, while "Line of Fire" performed by E-Type and the Poodles and "Visst finns mirakel" performed by Suzzie Tapper advanced to the Second Chance round. "Alla gamla X" performed by Face-84, "Déjà vu" performed by Velvet, "Lullaby" performed by Brandur, and "That's Love" performed by Michael Michailoff were eliminated from the contest.
- The second heat took place on 16 February 2008 at the ABB Arena in Västerås. "Empty Room" performed by Sanna Nielsen and "Just a Minute" performed by Rongedal qualified directly to the final, while "One Love" performed by Johnson and Häggkvist and "Love in Stereo" performed by Ola advanced to the Second Chance round. "Du behöver aldrig mer vara rädd" performed by Lasse Lindh, "Razborka" performed by The Nicole, "Den första svalan" performed by Alexander Schöld, and "Kebabpizza Slivovitza" performed by Andra Generationen were eliminated from the contest.
- The third heat took place on 23 February 2008 at the Cloetta Center in Linköping. "Lay Your Love on Me" performed by BWO and "Upp o hoppa" performed by Frida feat. Headline qualified directly to the final, while "Smiling in Love" performed by Caracola and "When You Need Me" performed by Thérèse Andersson advanced to the Second Chance round. "Izdajice" performed by Mirza Huskic, "Under mitt tunna skinn" performed by Patrik Isaksson and Band, "Jag saknar dig ibland" performed by Ainbusk, and "Hallelujah New World" performed by Eskobar were eliminated from the contest.
- The fourth heat took place on 1 March 2008 at the Telenor Arena in Karlskrona. "Hero" performed by Charlotte Perrelli and "Hur svårt kan det va?" performed by Linda Bengtzing qualified directly to the final, while "That Is Where I'll Go" performed by Sibel and "I lågornas sken" performed by Nordman advanced to the Second Chance round. "För många ord om kärlek" performed by Niklas Strömstedt, "If I Could" performed by Calaisa, "Pame" performed by Daniel Mitsogiannis, and "Ingen mår så bra som jag" performed by Fronda were eliminated from the contest.
- The Second Chance round (Andra chansen) took place on 8 March 2008 at the Arena Arctica in Kiruna. "That Is Where I'll Go" performed by Sibel and "I lågornas sken" performed by Nordman qualified to the final.

==== Final ====
The final of Melodifestivalen 2008 was held on 15 March 2008 at the Globe Arena in Stockholm. The eight direct qualifiers and the two Andra Chansen winner competed in the final, where the 11 regional juries of Sweden, along with televoting, selected the winner that would represent Sweden in the Eurovision Song Contest 2008.

The winner of Melodifestivalen 2008 was Charlotte Perrelli with the song "Hero", receiving a total of 114 points from the juries and 110 points from the televote. The winner of the televote, however, was Sanna Nielsen with "Empty Room".

Final – 15 March 2008
R/O	Artist	Song	Jury	Public	Total	Place
1	Charlotte Perrelli	"Hero"	114	110	224	1
2	Sibel	"That Is Where I'll Go"	39	0	39	7
3	Rongedal	"Just a Minute"	76	66	142	4
4	Linda Bengtzing	"Hur svårt kan det va?"	64	0	64	5
5	Christer Sjögren	"I Love Europe"	1	22	23	9
6	Amy Diamond	"Thank You"	25	11	36	8
7	Sanna Nielsen	"Empty Room"	74	132	206	2
8	Nordman	"I lågornas sken"	4	44	48	6
9	Frida feat. Headline	"Upp o hoppa"	6	0	6	10
10	BWO	"Lay Your Love on Me"	70	88	158	3

== At Eurovision ==
Sweden qualified from the second semi-final as the jury wildcard. They performed as song number 15 in the final, after Latvia and before Denmark, where they achieved 18th place and 47 points.

The commentators for the event for SVT1 were Kristian Luuk and Josef Sterzenbach, with a brief appearance by Carl Bildt in the final. SVT appointed Björn Gustafsson as its spokesperson to announce the Swedish votes.

=== Voting ===
==== Points awarded to Sweden ====
Points awarded to Sweden (Semi-final 2)
Score	Country
12 points	Denmark
10 points	
8 points	Iceland
7 points	Malta
6 points	United Kingdom
5 points	
4 points	Cyprus
3 points	Lithuania; Portugal; Serbia; Switzerland
2 points	Turkey
1 point	Albania; France; Hungary

Points awarded to Sweden (Final)
Score	Country
12 points	Malta
10 points	
8 points	Denmark
7 points	Norway
6 points	
5 points	Finland
4 points	
3 points	Albania; Iceland
2 points	Estonia; Serbia
1 point	Cyprus; Hungary; Israel; Lithuania; Spain

==== Points awarded by Sweden ====
Points awarded by Sweden (Semi-final 2)
Score	Country
12 points	Denmark
10 points	Iceland
8 points	Latvia
7 points	Albania
6 points	Turkey
5 points	Portugal
4 points	Croatia
3 points	Ukraine
2 points	Macedonia
1 point	Georgia

Points awarded by Sweden (Final)
Score	Country
12 points	Norway
10 points	Bosnia and Herzegovina
8 points	Iceland
7 points	Finland
6 points	Serbia
5 points	Denmark
4 points	France
3 points	Latvia
2 points	Armenia
1 point	Greece
