= Kebab pizza =

Pizza with kebab ingredients

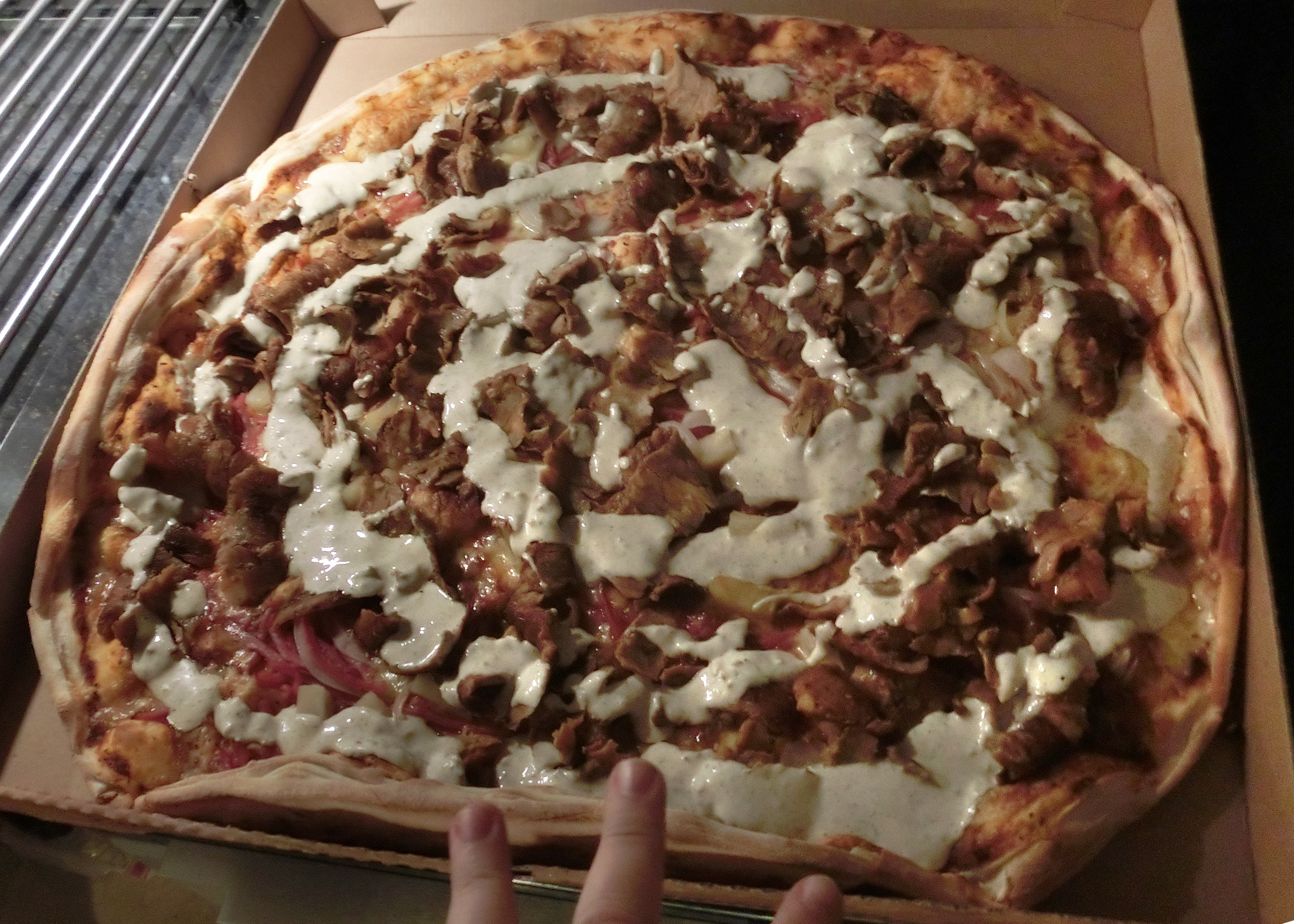
- Family-sized kebab pizza from Pizzeria La Bella in Hillerstorp.
- Type: Pizza
- Course: Main
- Place of origin: Sweden
- Created by: Unknown
- Invented: 1980s
- Serving temperature: Hot

Kebab pizza (Swedish: kebabpizza) is a Swedish style of pizza topped with kebab meat and other ingredients, the precise topping often varying between restaurants. The kebab pizza was created by Middle Eastern immigrants in the 1980s. Since its creation, the kebab pizza has increased in popularity and is today one of Sweden's most popular pizzas, and one of the most popular fast food dishes overall. Due to its popularity the dish has reached a position of cultural prominence in Sweden as well as all over Scandinavia, sometimes being invoked in popular culture and politics.

== Origin and history ==
The kebab pizza was invented in Sweden and combines Italian and Turkish cuisine. The first pizzeria in Sweden opened in Västerås in 1947, following the arrival of 300 guest workers from Italy to the city. Further pizzerias were founded in the 1960s, and pizza gradually became the most common fast food in the country. After the first wave of Italian immigration into Sweden, few Italians moved to the country with the ambition to make pizzas. Pizzerias in Sweden are today instead predominantly run by immigrants from the Middle East and the Balkans who were unable to find work within the fields they had been educated in their home countries and thus adopted pizza-making as a first business. In the 1980s, kebab and falafel restaurants began to crop up throughout Sweden and in many smaller towns it was common for restaurants to offer both pizza and kebab. The kebab pizza originated at some point during this time, though the original creator and precise time is unknown.

According to the Swedish food company Schysst käk, the kebab pizza can be traced back to 1982. Unlike many other influential dishes, no pizzeria in Sweden has made the claim to be the point of origin of the kebab pizza. The earliest known record of a kebab pizza in the menu collections of the National Library of Sweden dates to 1986 and is from Pizza Dali at Höglandstorget in Bromma. Pizza Dali called their pizza the "shish kebab-pizza" and it included tomatoes, cheese, onions, bell peppers, and beef tenderloin. The next earliest record is from 1988 at Pizzeria Amigo in Eksjö, where the pizza was topped with cheese, tomatoes, kebab meat, onions, champignons, friggitelli, and Béarnaise sauce.

== Varieties ==
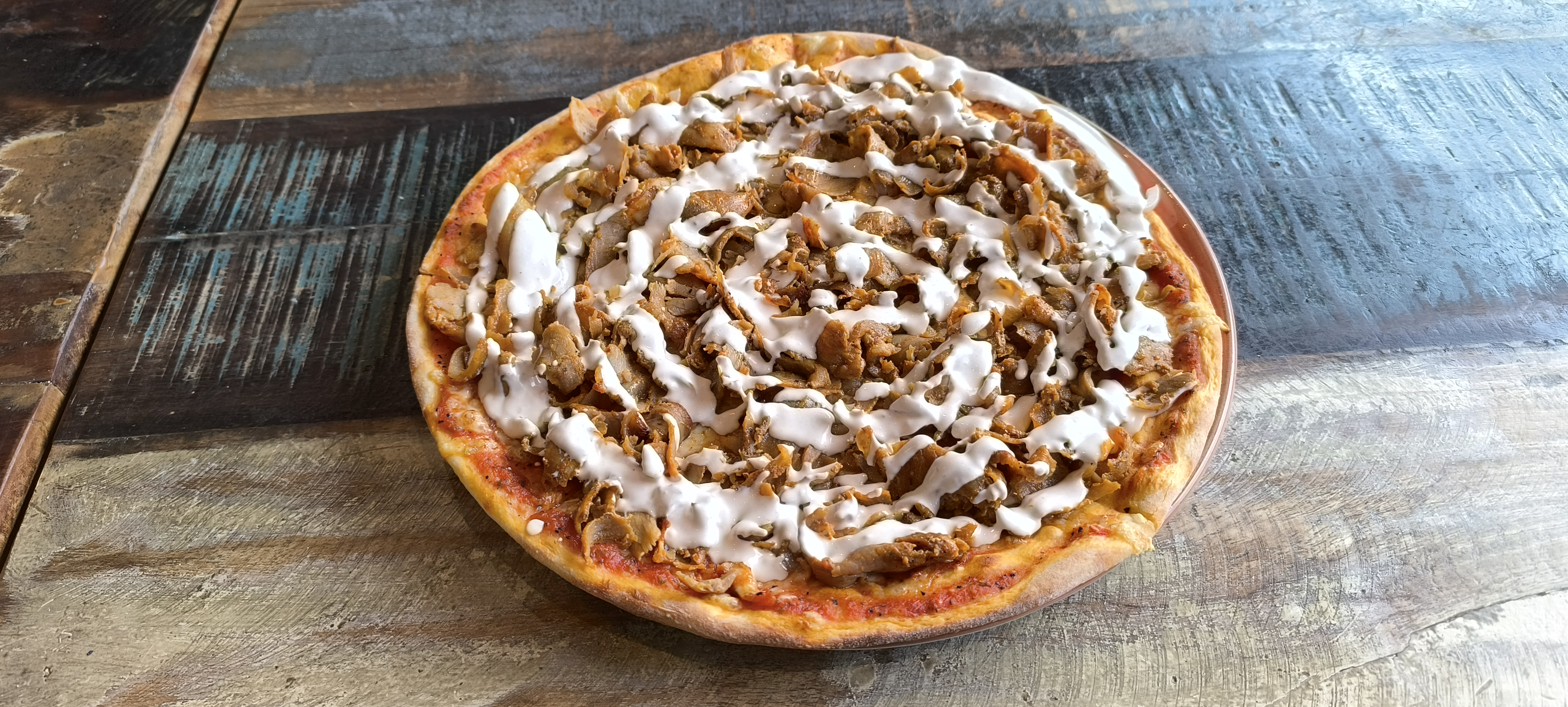
Kebab pizza from Gothenburg.

Kebab pizzas can vary greatly from restaurant to restaurant. They are typically topped with kebab meat, onions, friggitelli and sauce. The kebab meat is typically beef but is sometimes replaced by chicken. The sauce used, called kebab sauce (kebabsås) in Sweden, is most often a mixture of yogurt or sour cream and various spices. The most significant difference between kebab pizzas from different pizzerias is whether or not the common sides for kebab (such as french fries and lettuce) are added to the pizza.

Some pizzerias also serve a "Viking kebab pizza", a kebab pizza that has been folded to resemble the shape of a Viking ship. In 2021, the Sweden men's national football team developed the "football pizza" (fotbollspizza), a variation of kebab pizza with kebab, mozzarella cheese, tomato sauce, garlic sauce, herbs, champignons, onions, chili pepper, and pizza salad. Vegan kebab pizzas may replace the kebab meat with seitan or soy kebab.

== International spread ==
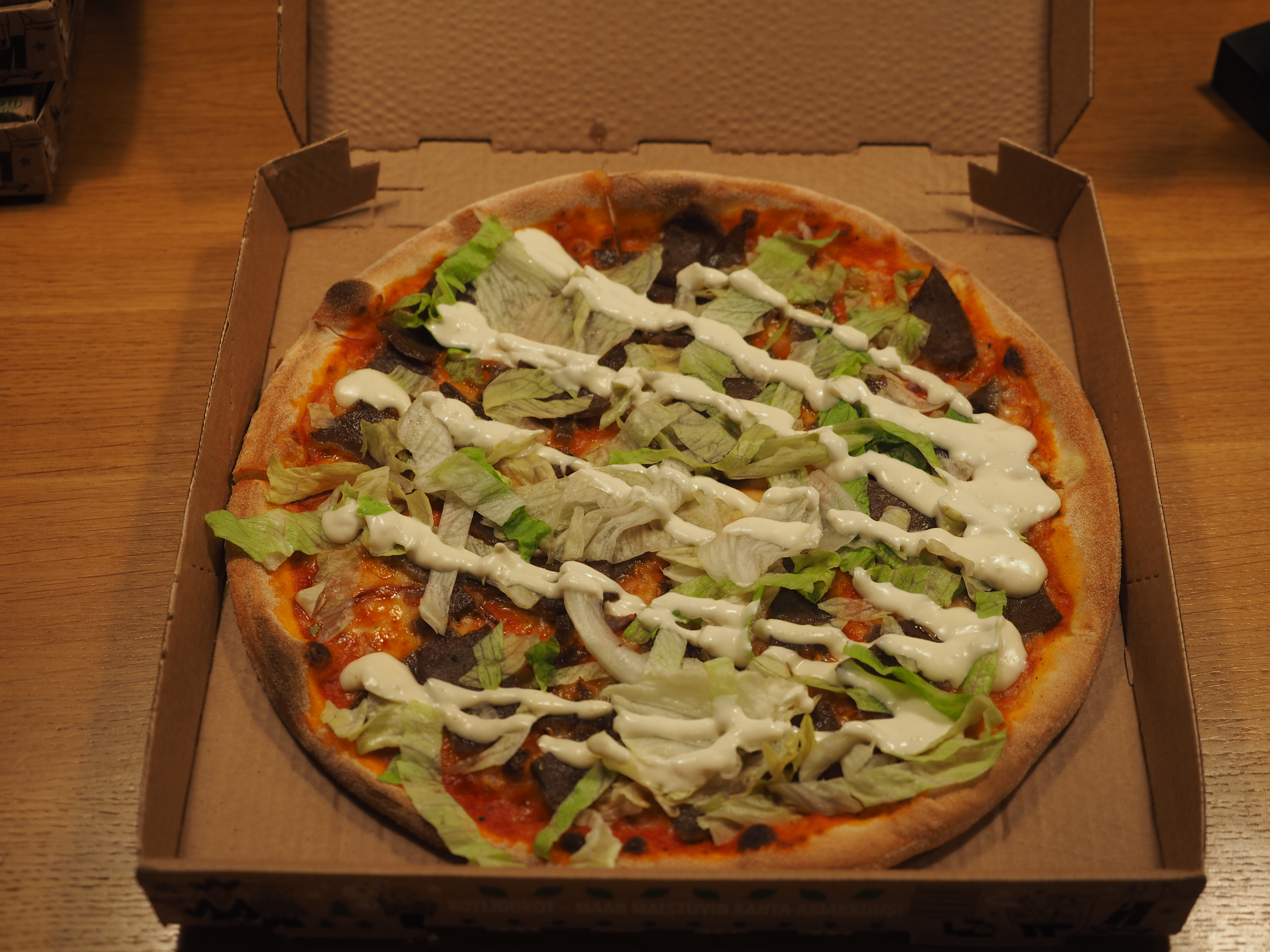
Kebab pizza from Kotipizza in Finland

Although the kebab pizza remains most prolific in Sweden, it has also spread internationally, even to Italy. The exact ingredients used as topping vary between countries. It is, for instance, common for the toppings of kebab pizzas in Norway to include maize and for Danish and Finnish kebab pizzas to include garlic. Kebab pizzas in the United Kingdom typically use lamb meat.

Pizzerias serving Swedish-style pizzas and kebab restaurants have also spread the kebab pizza, with few differences from the Swedish original, even further internationally to countries such as the United States, Spain, Australia, and Malta. Pizza Karma, a restaurant in Minneapolis, Minnesota, opened in 2018, serves chicken kebab pizzas inspired by Indian cuisine.

In 2020, British Domino's Pizza restaurants began to offer kebab pizzas in the form of the "beef doner pizza", though it was only available for a limited time. Domino's also serve chicken kebab pizzas with garlic sauce in France and in the Netherlands. Pizza Hut has, with reportedly mixed results, experimented with kebab pizzas in Pakistan in an attempt to appeal to the local market, introducing products such as the "bihari kabob pizza" with meat infused with masala and mustard oil. Frozen kebab pizzas have also begun being sold internationally, including by the British supermarket Iceland.

Though the two dishes are unrelated, the Swedish author Jenny Damberg has compared the kebab pizza to the Middle Eastern lahmacun, a type of flatbread sometimes topped with kebab meat.

== Culture ==
Pizzas of different types sold in Sweden in 2018
1. Kebab pizza (19.7%)
2. Vesuvio (15.9%)
3. Hawaiian (11.3%)
4. Capricciosa (9.80%)
5. Margherita (7.83%)
6. Calzone (7.30%)
7. Chicken (3.55%)
8. Funghi (2.29%)
9. Bussola (1.89%)
10. Gyros (1.66%)
11. Other (18.8%)

The kebab pizza has reached a position of cultural prominence in Sweden and is a common comfort food and hangover food. Although rarely considered to be part of traditional Swedish cuisine, the kebab pizza has been described as among the "most recognizable dishes in Sweden", one of the "most Swedish foods", the "most essential weird Swedish food" and a "uniquely Swedish creation". The Swedish author Marcus Priftis described the kebab pizza in 2012 as a "typically Swedish culinary innovation" that could not have been invented elsewhere; Priftis noted that its creation was only possible in a country where the same chefs made both kebab and pizzas and where the consumers view both foods as interchangeable products. Priftis further noted that although it was developed by immigrants, it was developed for the general Swedish public and was thus in his opinion an example of evolving Swedish culture rather than "immigrant culture". The Swedish author Annika Windahl Pontén has compared the kebab pizza's place in Swedish cuisine to that of kåldolmar, a type of cabbage rolls that originated as a Swedish version of the Turkish dolma in the 18th century, and speculated that it like kåldolmar may one day be seen as a traditional dish.

Kebab pizza is sometimes jokingly called the national dish of Sweden. According to yearly surveys by Onlinepizza, kebab pizza is one of the most popular pizzas in Sweden and most years it has been the most sold named pizza, sometimes losing to Vesuvio (a pizza topped with ham); it is thus perhaps the most popular fast food dish in the country. New Year's Day is the day when most pizzas are sold in Sweden, often twice as many as on other days. In 2016, the politician Robert Hannah, member of the Riksdag and son of a pizza baker, proposed making New Year's Day into "kebab pizza day" both due to how high sales of pizzas are on New Year's Day and as a way to honor Sweden's foreign culinary heritage and highlight positive effects of immigration. Hannah's motion called the kebab pizza the "shining star among all pizzas". During the COVID-19 pandemic, kebab pizzas have been one of the most ordered fast foods in Sweden, particularly in major cities; it has for instance been the most ordered dish through the company Foodora in both Gothenburg and Linköping.

The kebab pizza has been described by some commentators as combining Italian and Turkish food in a way that might horrify or confuse both nationalities and as a "Frankenstein's monster-like creation". The Swedish chef Magnus Nilsson argued in 2015 that the kebab pizza differs so much from its Italian origins that "it's no longer an Italian thing made in Sweden, it's Swedish". Also in 2015, Ellie Bennett of The Local Italy called the kebab pizza "decidedly un-Italian". Some Italians have lamented the kebab pizza as an insult to Italian cuisine and cultural heritage.

In Melodifestivalen 2008, the band Andra Generationen performed the song Kebabpizza Slivovitza.

On 21 July 2021, two inmates at the Hällby prison near Tumbo took two correctional officers as hostages and demanded a helicopter to use for escaping and twenty kebab pizzas, one for each inmate in their department. After nine hours of negotiations, the release of the hostages was secured and the inmates were taken into custody. Although no helicopter was provided, the inmates did receive the twenty kebab pizzas. The pizzas were made by the pizza baker Beshar Toma of Hällby Pizzeria. Due to being in a hurry, the police left with the pizzas without paying. Both Hällby Pizzeria and the Swedish Prison and Probation Service later confirmed that the pizzeria was paid the next day.

== See also ==
- List of pizza varieties by country
- Greek pizza
- Pizza toppings
