= Patrik Isaksson =

Patrik Isaksson may refer to:

- Patrik Isaksson (singer) (born 1972), Swedish singer and songwriter
  - Patrik Isaksson (album), 2006
- Patrik Isaksson (swimmer) (born 1973), breaststroke swimmer from Sweden
