= 10 år – En snäll mans bekännelser =

Compilation album by Patrik Isaksson
- Released: 2 July 2008
- Recorded: 1999–2008
- Genre: pop
- Length: 1 hours, 15 minutes
- Label: King Island Roxystars Recordings

Patrik Isaksson chronology
Patrik Isaksson (2006)	10 år – En snäll mans bekännelser (2008)	No. 6 (2011)

10 år – En snäll mans bekännelser is a 2008 compilation album by Patrik Isaksson.

== Track listing ==
1. "Du får göra som du vill"
2. "Ruta 1"
3. "Under mitt tunna skinn"
4. "Kom genom eld" - single remix
5. "Elddon"
6. "Hjärtat vet mer än vi" - with Helen Sjöholm
7. "Innan klockan slår" - with Dea
8. "1985"
9. "Det som var nu" - with Marie Fredriksson
10. "Aldrig mer"
11. "Hos dig är jag underbar"
12. "Faller du så faller jag"
13. "Du som tog mitt hjärta" - with Sarah Dawn Finer
14. "Här kommer natten" - with Joey Tempest
15. "Vår sista dag"
16. "Kan du se mig"
17. "Innan dagen gryr (2008)"
18. "Koppången" - with Kalle Moraeus & Bengan Janson

== Charts ==
Chart (2008)	Peak position
Swedish Albums (Sverigetopplistan)	3
