= Line of Fire (song) =

Single by E-Type & The Poodles
- A-side: "Line of Fire"
- B-side: "Line of Fire" (singback version)
- Released: 12 March 2008
- Genre: Eurodance, heavy metal
- Songwriters: E-Type, Jakob Samuelsson

"Line of Fire" is a song performed by E-Type and The Poodles at Melodifestivalen 2008, participating in the first semifinal in Gothenburg. Ending up third, the song went further to Andra chansen ni Kiruna on 8 March 2008, participating against Sibel Redzep's That is Where I'll Go, ending up knocked out.

== Single ==
The single was released on 12 March 2008, peaking at third position at the Swedish singles chart. The song also ended up as the 94th most successful Trackslistan song of 2008.

=== Track listing ===
1. Line of Fire (radio edit)
2. Line of Fire (singback version)

== Charts ==
=== Weekly charts ===
| Chart (2008) | Peak position |
|---|---|
| Sweden (Sverigetopplistan) | 3 |

=== Year-end charts ===
| Chart (2008) | Position |
|---|---|
| Sweden (Sverigetopplistan) | 46 |
