= The Diving Belle =

- Album cover

Studio album by Sibel
- Released: 12 March 2008
- Recorded: 2008
- Genre: Pop rock, pop, ambient music
- Length: 45:00
- Language: English
- Label: Warner Bros., Warner Music Sweden
- Producer: Christian Antblad, Peter Swartling

Singles from The Diving Belle
- 1. "That is Where I'll Go" Released: 9 March 2008; 2. "Make Believe" Released: July 2008; 3. "Walking Away" Released: 6 October 2008; 4. "I'm Sorry" Released: 30 January 2009

The Diving Belle is the debut album from Turkish/Macedonian-born singer Sibel. The album was released 12 March 2008 and reached number nine on the Swedish album charts. The album includes the single "That Is Where I'll Go", written by Christian Antblad, Sibel's entry to Melodifestivalen 2008.

== Track listing ==
1. "That Is Where I'll Go"(Christian Antblad)
2. "Make Believe" (Steve Howard, Neil Athale)
3. "How I Tried to Let You Go" (Christian Antblad, Sibel Redžep)
4. "I'm Sorry" (Jonas Saeed, Pontus Söderqvist, Kenicha Pratt)
5. "Maybe Someday" (Christian Antblad, Gary Baker, Matt Johnson)
6. "Walking Away" (Nicklas Molinder, Joacim Persson, Johan Alkenäs, J. Fransson, Tobias Lundgren, Tim Larsson)
7. "Don't You Wanna Know" (Christian Antblad, Michael Garvin)
8. "Until the World Fades Away" (Christian Antblad, Michael Jay)
9. "The Reason Was You" (Paul Carrack, Christian Antblad)
10. "Any Day Now"(Christian Antblad)
11. "All I Need Is One" (Christian Antblad, John Bettis, Wayne Kirkpatrick)
12. "Open Arms"(Christian Antblad)
13. "The Night Is Still Young" (iTunes Bonus Track) (Christian Antblad, Thomas Ahlstrand)

== Chart performance ==
The album stayed on the Swedish albums chart for a total of seven weeks entering and peaking at number nine on 20 March 2008 and dropping out on 1 May 2008.

== Singles ==
- "That Is Where I'll Go"
  - Reached number 6 on the Swedish chart.
- "Make Believe"

== Album credits ==
- Vocals: Sibel Redžep.
- Backing Vocals: Sibel Redžep, Chris Antblad, Caroline Antblad.
- Piano: Thomas Lasser, Johan Alkenäs.
- Strings: Scandinavian Strings.
- Guitar: Fredrik Larsson, Jeff King, Joacim Persson, Cem Köksal.
- Electric Guitar: Sayit Dölen.
- Bass: Joel Starander, Gary Baker.
- Drums: Josh Haselton.

== Chart positions ==
| Chart (2008) | Peak position |
|---|---|
| Sweden | 9 |
