= I midvintertid, en jul på Gotland =

Studio album by Ainbusk
- Released: November 2001
- Genre: Christmas
- Length: circa 58 minutes
- Label: Stockholm

Ainbusk chronology
Stolt (1999)	I midvintertid, en jul på Gotland (2001)	Skynda att älska (2002)

I midvintertid, en jul på Gotland is a Christmas album by Ainbusk, released in November 2001.

== Track listing ==
1. Det sista vi har kvar (Happy Xmas (War Is Over))
2. Stilla natt (Stille Nacht, heilige Nacht)
3. Jul, jul, strålande jul
4. En julsaga (Fairytale of New York), duet with Håkan Hemlin
5. I juletidens timma (Have Yourself a Merry Little Christmas)
6. Var hälsad, sköna morgonstund
7. Under stjärnan
8. Förevigt nu (Forever Young)
9. Härlig är Jorden (Schönster Herr Jesu)
10. Godnattvalsen (Auld Lang Syne)
11. Betlehems stjärna
12. Bach Christmas Oratorio (interruption of part 1)
13. Hemma

== Chart positions ==
Chart (2001)	Peak position
Sweden (Sverigetopplistan)	2
