= Caracola =

Caracola may refer to

- Caracola (band), a Swedish girl group that changed its name later on to be known as Sheelah
- Caracola (song), a Spanish song by Los TNT, and Spain's entry in 1964 to the Eurovision Song Contest
