= Melodifestivalen 2008 =

Swedish music competition

Dates and venue
- Heat 1: 9 February 2008
- Heat 2: 16 February 2008
- Heat 3: 23 February 2008
- Heat 4: 1 March 2008
- Second chance: 8 March 2008
- Final: 15 March 2008

Organisation
- Broadcaster: Sveriges Television (SVT)
- Presenter: Kristian Luuk

Participants
- Number of entries: 32
- Number of finalists: 10

Vote
- Voting system: Heats and Second chance: 100% public vote Final: 50% public vote, 50% jury vote
- Winning song: "Hero" by Charlotte Perrelli

Melodifestivalen 2008 was the 48th edition of the Swedish music competition Melodifestivalen, which was organised by Sveriges Television (SVT) and took place over a six-week period between 9 February and 15 March 2008. The winner of the competition was Charlotte Perrelli with the song "Hero", who represented Sweden in the Eurovision Song Contest 2008, where she came eighteenth with 47 points.

== Format ==
Melodifestivalen 2008 included 32 songs split up into four heats with eight participants in each. The heats were held between 9 February and 1 March 2008 and at each, the two top placing songs went to the final, while the third and fourth place songs went to the Andra Chansen (Second Chance Round). At the second chance round, held on 8 March 2008, the eight songs paired off in two rounds with the two winners at the end of the night qualifying for the final. The final was held on 15 March 2008 and included the eight songs from the heats along with the two from the Andra Chansen to make ten songs in all.

Competition Schedule
Show	Date	City	Venue
Heat 1	9 February 2008	Gothenburg	Scandinavium
Heat 2	16 February 2008	Västerås	ABB Arena
Heat 3	23 February 2008	Linköping	Cloetta Center
Heat 4	1 March 2008	Karlskrona	Telenor Arena
Second chance	8 March 2008	Kiruna	Arena Arctica
Final	15 March 2008	Stockholm	Stockholm Globe Arena

It was hosted by Kristian Luuk, who also hosted the 2007 event. Luuk was assisted by Björn Gustafsson and Nour El-Refai.

=== Wildcards ===
Starting in 2004, four out of the 32 participants were selected directly by the contest's producers, in order to increase musical and artistic breadth. Each artist, called "wildcard", participated in a different heat. The wildcards in 2008 were the following:

Artist	Song	Heat
Amy Diamond	"Thank You"	Heat 1
Johnson & Häggkvist	"One Love"	Heat 2
Eskobar	"Hallelujah New World"	Heat 3
Niklas Strömstedt	"För många ord om kärlek"	Heat 4

== Competing entries ==
Artist	Song	Songwriter(s)
Ainbusk	"Jag saknar dig ibland"	Bobby Ljunggren; Henrik Wikström; Ingela Forsman
Alexander Schöld	"Den första svalan"	Anders Wikström; Fredrik Thomander; Ingela Forsman
Amy Diamond	"Thank You"	Mathias Venge; Peter Wennerberg; Sandra Nordström
Andra generationen	"Kebabpizza Slivovitza"	Mats Nilsson; Otis Sandsjö; Stevan Tomulevski; Teddy Paunkoski; Vlatko Ancevski; Vlatko Gicarevski
Brandur	"Lullaby"	Henrik Wikström; Kristian Lagerström
BWO	"Lay Your Love on Me"	Alexander Bard; Anders Hansson; Bobby Ljunggren; Henrik Wikström
Calaisa	"If I Could"	Anna Törnqvist; Caisa Troedsson-Lundin; Jörgen Ringqvist; Lisa Troedsson-Lundin; Malin Törnqvist; Pontus Assarsson
Caracola	"Smiling in Love"	Angelica Thelin; Henrik Bie; Magnus Lanner; Mattias Olsson
Charlotte Perrelli	"Hero"	Bobby Ljunggren; Fredrik Kempe
Christer Sjögren	"I Love Europe"	Ingela Forsman; Magnus Johansson; Torgny Söderberg
Daniel Mitsogiannis	"Pame"	Fredrik Kempe; Henrik Wikström
E-Type & The Poodles	"Line of Fire"	Jakob Samuelsson; Martin Eriksson
Eskobar	"Hallelujah New World"	Daniel Bellqvist; Frederik Zäll; Robert Birming
Face-84	"Alla gamla X"	Lars Diedricson; Martin Hedström; Wille Crafoord
Frida feat. Headline	"Upp o hoppa"	Anderz Wrethov; Frida Muranius; Sam Persson
Fronda	"Ingen mår så bra som jag"	Michael Clauss; Sebastian Fronda; Thomas Thörnholm
Johnson & Häggkvist	"One Love"	Andreas Johnson; Carola Häggkvist; Peter Kvint
Lasse Lindh	"Du behöver aldrig mer vara rädd"	Lasse Lindh
Linda Bengtzing	"Hur svårt kan det va?"	Johan Fransson; Tim Larsson; Tobias Lundgren
Michael Michailoff	"That's Love"	Joakim Övrenius; Michael Michailoff; Patric Jonsson
Mickey Huskić	"Izdajice"	Mickey Huskić
Niklas Strömstedt	"För många ord om kärlek"	Niklas Strömstedt
Nordman	"I lågornas sken"	Lina Eriksson; Mårten Eriksson
Ola	"Love in Stereo"	Mirja Breitholtz; Tony Nilsson
Patrik Isaksson & Bandet	"Under mitt tunna skinn"	Patrik Isaksson
Rongedal	"Just a Minute"	Amir Aly; Henrik Rongedal; Henrik Wikström; Magnus Rongedal
Sanna Nielsen	"Empty Room"	Aleena Gibson; Bobby Ljunggren
Sibel	"That Is Where I'll Go"	Christian Antblad
Suzzie Tapper	"Visst finns mirakel"	Amir Aly; Bobby Ljunggren; Maciel Numhauser; Robin Abrahamsson; Suzzie Tapper
The Nicole	"Razborka"	Nicole Fuentes; Stefan Åberg; Tord Bäckström
Thérèse Andersson	"When You Need Me"	Jonas Sjöström; Malin Eriksson; Pontus Hagberg
Velvet	"Déjà vu"	David Jassy; Fredrik Larsson; Joacim Persson; Niclas Molinder; Niko Valsamidis; Pelle Ankarberg

== Contest overview ==
=== Heat 1 ===
The first heat took place on 9 February 2008 at the Scandinavium in Gothenburg. 3,241,000 viewers watched the heat live. A total of 600,804 votes were cast, with a total of SEK 1,383,453 collected for Radiohjälpen.

R/O	Artist	Song	Votes			Place	Result
R/O	Artist	Song	Round 1	Round 2	Total	Place	Result
1	E-Type & The Poodles	"Line of Fire"	46,333	56,105	102,438	3	Second chance
2	Face-84	"Alla gamla X"	13,626	—N/a	13,626	8	Out
3	Velvet	"Déjà vu"	25,451	31,047	56,498	5	Out
4	Brandur	"Lullaby"	18,727	—N/a	18,727	7	Out
5	Michael Michailoff	"That's Love"	23,198	—N/a	23,198	6	Out
6	Amy Diamond	"Thank You"	79,075	96,508	175,583	1	Final
7	Suzzie Tapper	"Visst finns mirakel"	24,469	32,130	56,599	4	Second chance
8	Christer Sjögren	"I Love Europe"	71,396	81,471	152,867	2	Final

=== Heat 2 ===
The second heat took place on 16 February 2008 at the ABB Arena in Västerås. 3,341,000 viewers watched the heat live. A total of 752,537 votes were cast, with a total of SEK 1,645,915 collected for Radiohjälpen.

R/O	Artist	Song	Votes			Place	Result
R/O	Artist	Song	Round 1	Round 2	Total	Place	Result
1	Ola	"Love in Stereo"	39,972	52,615	92,587	4	Second chance
2	Lasse Lindh	"Du behöver aldrig mer vara rädd"	15,396	—N/a	15,396	6	Out
3	The Nicole	"Razborka"	6,121	—N/a	6,121	8	Out
4	Alexander Schöld	"Den första svalan"	13,352	—N/a	13,352	7	Out
5	Rongedal	"Just a Minute"	68,121	94,101	162,222	2	Final
6	Sanna Nielsen	"Empty Room"	102,390	126,356	228,746	1	Final
7	Andra generationen	"Kebabpizza Slivovitza"	33,011	43,509	76,520	5	Out
8	Johnson & Häggkvist	"One Love"	77,778	79,106	156,884	3	Second chance

=== Heat 3 ===
The third heat took place on 23 February 2008 at the Cloetta Center in Linköping. 3,110,000 viewers watched the heat live. A total of 437,744 votes were cast, with a total of SEK 1,129,905 collected for Radiohjälpen.

R/O	Artist	Song	Votes			Place	Result
R/O	Artist	Song	Round 1	Round 2	Total	Place	Result
1	BWO	"Lay Your Love on Me"	58,136	82,381	140,517	1	Final
2	Mickey Huskić	"Izdajice"	11,721	—N/a	11,721	7	Out
3	Frida feat. Headline	"Upp o hoppa"	27,675	40,852	68,527	2	Final
4	Thérèse Andersson	"When You Need Me"	25,034	33,849	58,883	4	Second chance
5	Patrik Isaksson & Bandet	"Under mitt tunna skinn"	26,056	33,808	59,864	5	Out
6	Caracola	"Smiling in Love"	31,652	35,491	67,143	3	Second chance
7	Ainbusk	"Jag saknar dig ibland"	18,249	—N/a	18,249	6	Out
8	Eskobar	"Hallelujah New World"	11,672	—N/a	11,672	8	Out

=== Heat 4 ===
The fourth heat took place on 1 March 2008 at the Telenor Arena in Karlskrona. 3,410,000 viewers watched the heat live. A total of 701,978 votes were cast, with a total of SEK 1,606,560 collected for Radiohjälpen.

R/O	Artist	Song	Votes			Place	Result
R/O	Artist	Song	Round 1	Round 2	Total	Place	Result
1	Niklas Strömstedt	"För många ord om kärlek"	13,067	—N/a	13,067	8	Out
2	Calaisa	"If I Could"	30,124	47,846	77,970	5	Out
3	Daniel Mitsogiannis	"Pame"	20,432	—N/a	20,432	7	Out
4	Linda Bengtzing	"Hur svårt kan det va?"	53,813	70,571	124,384	2	Final
5	Nordman	"I lågornas sken"	39,019	58,673	97,782	4	Second chance
6	Sibel	"That Is Where I'll Go"	46,289	59,030	105,319	3	Second chance
7	Fronda	"Ingen mår så bra som jag"	25,234	—N/a	25,234	6	Out
8	Charlotte Perrelli	"Hero"	98,666	137,738	236,404	1	Final

=== Second chance ===
The second chance round took place on 8 March 2008 at the Arena Arctica in Kiruna. 3,090,000 viewers watched the show live. A total of 1,464,019 votes were cast.

Round 1
Duel	R/O	Artist	Song	Votes	Result
I	1	E-Type & The Poodles	"Line of Fire"	87,002	Out
I	2	Sibel	"That Is Where I'll Go"	103,077	Round 2
II	1	Ola	"Love in Stereo"	78,477	Round 2
II	2	Caracola	"Smiling in Love"	51,038	Out
III	1	Johnson & Häggkvist	"One Love"	202,353	Out
III	2	Nordman	"I lågornas sken"	316,118	Round 2
IV	1	Thérèse Andersson	"When You Need Me"	57,335	Out
IV	2	Suzzie Tapper	"Visst finns mirakel"	73,120	Round 2

Round 2
Duel	R/O	Artist	Song	Votes	Result
I	1	Sibel	"That Is Where I'll Go"	137,065	Final
I	2	Ola	"Love in Stereo"	103,624	Out
II	1	Nordman	"I lågornas sken"	166,735	Final
II	2	Suzzie Tapper	"Visst finns mirakel"	88,075	Out

=== Final ===
The final took place on 15 March 2008 at the Stockholm Globe Arena in Stockholm. 4,046,000 viewers watched the heat live. A total of 2,410,220 votes were cast, with a total of SEK 4,521,176 collected for Radiohjälpen.

R/O	Artist	Song	Juries	Televote		Total	Place
R/O	Artist	Song	Juries	Votes	Points	Total	Place
1	Charlotte Perrelli	"Hero"	114	397,907	110	224	1
2	Sibel	"That Is Where I'll Go"	39	120,587	0	39	7
3	Rongedal	"Just a Minute"	76	273,521	66	142	4
4	Linda Bengtzing	"Hur svårt kan det va?"	64	115,321	0	64	5
5	Christer Sjögren	"I Love Europe"	1	228,674	22	23	9
6	Amy Diamond	"Thank You"	25	188,872	11	36	8
7	Sanna Nielsen	"Empty Room"	74	449,419	132	206	2
8	Nordman	"I lågornas sken"	4	233,467	44	48	6
9	Frida feat. Headline	"Upp o hoppa"	6	81,691	0	6	10
10	BWO	"Lay Your Love on Me"	70	320,741	88	158	3

Detailed jury votes
R/O	Song	Örebro	Luleå	Falun	Karlstad	Umeå	Norrköping	Gothenburg	Sundsvall	Växjö	Malmö	Stockholm	Total
1	"Hero"	12	12	12	12	12	4	6	12	10	10	12	114
2	"That Is Where I'll Go"	1	2	4	2	2	2	4	8	1	12	1	39
3	"Just a Minute"	8	4	6	8	6	10	12	10	2		10	76
4	"Hur svårt kan det va?"	6	8	10	6	4	8		4	4	8	6	64
5	"I Love Europe"							1					1
6	"Thank You"	2	1	1		1	1	10	1	6		2	25
7	"Empty Room"	10	6	8	4	10	6		6	12	4	8	74
8	"I lågornas sken"				1			2			1		4
9	"Upp o hoppa"										6		6
10	"Lay Your Love on Me"	4	10	2	10	8	12	8	2	8	2	4	70
Jury spokespersons
Örebro – Yankho Kamwendo; Luleå – Claes Elfsberg; Falun – Annika Lantz; Karlstad – Kristoffer Appelquist; Umeå – Doreen Månsson; Norrköping – André Pops; Gothenburg – Hans Rosenfeldt; Sundsvall – Petra Mede; Växjö – Ola Lindholm; Malmö – Kattis Ahlström; Stockholm – Peter Settman

== Ratings ==
Viewing figures by show
Show	Air date	Viewers (millions)	Ref.
Heat 1	9 February 2008	3.241	
Heat 2	16 February 2008	3.341	
Heat 3	23 February 2008	3.110	
Heat 4	1 March 2008	3.410	
Second chance	8 March 2008	3.090	
Final	15 March 2008	4.046	

== See also ==
- Eurovision Song Contest 2008
- Sweden in the Eurovision Song Contest 2008
- Sweden in the Eurovision Song Contest
