= Dunka mig gul och blå =

Single by Frida Muranius

from the album Gasen i botten
- Released: 2007
- Genre: Pop
- Songwriters: Frida Muranius, Johan Nordlund

Dunka mig gul och blå (roughly "slap me yellow and blue", with a reference to the colours of the flag of Sweden) is a song written by Frida Muranius and Johan Nordlund. Recorded by Frida Muranius, it became a mid-2007 hit. topping the Swedish singles chart. Attention was also brought when the Sveriges Radio local station SR Kronoberg banned the song for associations to domestic violence.

== Chart positions ==
Chart (2007–2008)	Peak position
Sweden	1
