= När verkligheten tränger sig på =

Studio album by Patrik Isaksson
- Released: April 1999
- Genre: Pop
- Length: circa 45 minutes
- Label: Sony
- Producer: Anders Glenmark

Patrik Isaksson chronology
När verkligheten tränger sig på (1999)	Tillbaks på ruta 1 (2001)

När verkligheten tränger sig på is the debut studio album by Swedish singer-songwriter Patrik Isaksson. All of the tracks on the album were written by Isaksson and produced by Anders Glenmark. The album peaked at number one on the Swedish Albums Chart and was certified platinum in week 47 in 1999.

== Track listing ==
1. Hos dig är jag underbar
2. Nell
3. Du får göra som du vill
4. Kom genom eld
5. Vågorna
6. Lycklig man
7. Lyckligare dagar
8. Kan du se mig
9. Längesen
10. Älskat för två
11. Inget kan gå fel

== Personnel ==
Adapted from Tidal.

- Patrik Isaksson - composer, vocals, guitar
- Anders Glenmark - producing, bass, piano
- Henka Johansson - drums

== Charts ==
Chart (1999–2000)	Peak position	Certification
Swedish Albums (Sverigetopplistan)	1	GLF: Platinum
