= Jag saknar dig ibland =

Single by Ainbusk
- A-side: "Jag saknar dig ibland"
- B-side: "Jag saknar dig ibland" (singback version)
- Released: 2008
- Genre: pop, schlager
- Label: M&L Records
- Songwriters: Bobby Ljunggren, Henrik Wikström, Ingela "Pling" Forsman

Ainbusk singles chronology
"En julsaga (Fairytale of New York)" (2001)	"Jag saknar dig ibland" (2008)

Jag saknar dig ibland is a song written by Bobby Ljunggren and Henrik Wikström, and with lyrics by Ingela "Pling" Forsman, and originally performed by Ainbusk at Melodifestivalen 2008, where it ended up 6th in the semifinal in Linköping on 23 February 2008. The single peaked at 36th position at the Swedish singles chart.

The song was also tested for Svensktoppen on 9 March 2008, but failed to enter the chart. It got a new chance the upcoming week, but once again it failed to enter the chart.

Kristian Luuk performed the song during the Andra chansen act, referring to comedian Björn Gustafsson not being present in the pause acts. Even a music video was recorded.

== Charts ==
Chart (2008)	Peak position
Sweden (Sverigetopplistan)	36
