= Faller du så faller jag =

Single by Patrik Isaksson

from the album Patrik Isaksson
- A-side: "Faller du så faller jag"
- B-side: "Faller du så faller jag" (instrumental)
- Released: 2006
- Genre: pop
- Label: Sony Music Entertainment
- Songwriter: Patrik Isaksson
- Producer: Anders Hansson

Patrik Isaksson singles chronology
"Vi som aldrig landat" (2004)	"Faller du så faller jag" (2006)	"Innan klockan slår" (2006)

"Faller du så faller jag" is a song written by Patrik Isaksson, and performed by himself at Melodifestivalen 2006, where it was knocked out at the Second Chance Contest.

The single peaked at number 12 on the Swedish Singles Chart. On 23 April 2006, the song entered Svensktoppen, where it ended up at number six. The three following weeks, the song fell down, only to be knocked out of chart the upcoming week.

During Melodifestivalen 2012, the song was one of the "Third Chance" entries.

== Charts ==
Chart (2006)	Peak position
Sweden (Sverigetopplistan)	12
