= No. 6 (album) =

Studio album by Patrik Isaksson
- Released: 25 May 2011
- Genre: pop

Patrik Isaksson chronology
10 år – En snäll mans bekännelser (2008)	No. 6 (2011)

No. 6 (2011) is the sixth studio album by Swedish singer-songwriter Patrik Isaksson.

== Track listing ==
1. "Mitt Stockholm"
2. "Han liknar mig"
3. "Du var den som jag saknat"
4. "Säg mig"
5. "Mirakel"
6. "Septemberljus"
7. "Pojken med en lysande framtid"
8. "Ett betongbarn har hittat hem"
9. "Farväl döda stad"
10. "Sanningsspegeln"
11. "Min historia"
12. "Åh fina"

== Charts ==
Chart (2011)	Peak position
Swedish Albums (Sverigetopplistan)	28
