= Make Believe (Sibel Redžep song) =

Single by Sibel Redžep

from the album The Diving Belle
- Released: July 2008
- Recorded: 2008
- Genre: Pop
- Length: 03.36
- Label: Warner Bros./Warner/Chappel
- Songwriters: Steve Howard, Neil Athale, Sibel Redžep
- Producers: Twin & Fredrik Larsson

Sibel Redžep singles chronology
"That Is Where I'll Go" (2008)	"Make Believe" (2008)	"Walking Away" (2008)

"Make Believe" is the second single from singer Sibel Redžep, recorded by her on her 2008 album The Diving Belle. The song was released as a downloadable-only single in July 2008 and reached #56 on downloads alone after only one week. The song is connected to the Ronald McDonald Foundation in Sweden, where Sibel is an ambassador; the video for the song shows clips of disadvantaged children in graphic boxes around Sibel.

== Chart positions ==
Chart (2008)	Peak position
Sweden	56
