= Tillbaks på ruta 1 =

Studio album by Patrik Isaksson
- Released: 15 October 2001
- Recorded: Polar Studios, Stockholm, Sweden
- Genre: pop
- Length: ~45 minutes
- Label: Sony Music

Patrik Isaksson chronology
När verkligheten tränger sig på (1999)	Tillbaks på ruta 1 (2001)	Vi som aldrig landat (2004)

Tillbaks på ruta 1 is the second studio album by Patrik Isaksson, released on 15 October 2001. The album won a Rockbjörnen Award in the "Swedish album of the year" category.

== Track listing ==
1. Ruta 1 - 4:07
2. Tillbaks igen - 4:21
3. Aldrig mer - 4:22
4. Jag ber - 4:05
5. Hur kan du lova mig - 4:20
6. En sång om bättring - 2:52
7. Andetag - 4:10
8. Människor - 4:23
9. Välkommen hem - 4:07
10. Inre ro - 4:07 - 3:43
11. Tillbaks på ruta 1 - 4:23

== Contributors ==
- Patrik Isaksson - singer, composer, guitar
- Anders Glenmark - bass, piano
- Nicci Notini-Wallin - drums

== Charts ==
Chart (2001–2002)	Peak position
Danish Albums (Hitlisten)	8
Swedish Albums (Sverigetopplistan)	1
