= Du får göra som du vill =

Single by Patrik Isaksson

from the album När verkligheten tränger sig på
- A-side: "Du får göra som du vill"
- B-side: "Älskat för två"
- Released: 1999
- Genre: Pop
- Label: Sony Music Entertainment
- Songwriter: Patrik Isaksson
- Producer: Anders Glenmark

Patrik Isaksson singles chronology
"Du får göra som du vill" (1999)	"Hos dig är jag underbar" (1999)

"Du får göra som du vill" is a song written by Patrik Isaksson and recorded by himself for his 1999 debut album När verkligheten tränger sig på. The song was awarded a Grammis award for "Song of the year 1999".

The single peaked at No. 11 in the Swedish singles chart, and was tested for Svensktoppen on 20 March 1999, but failed to enter the chart.

The song appeared in the 2004 film Fröken Sverige.

Erik Linder recorded the song for his 2009 album Inifrån.

== Charts ==
Chart (1999)	Peak position
Sweden	11
