= Kebabpizza Slivovitza =

Single by Andra Generationen
- Released: 2008
- Genre: Balkan
- Label: M&L Records
- Songwriters: Vlatko Ancevski, Vlatko Gicarevski, Mats Nilsson, Teddy Paunkoski, Otis Sandsjö, Stevan Tomulevski

Andra Generationen singles chronology
"Heja Sverige" (2006)	"Kebabpizza Slivovitza" (2008)	"Hippare Hoppare" (2010)

Kebabpizza Slivovitza is a song performed at Melodifestivalen 2008 by the group Andra Generationen. Being knocked out at the semifinals, the song lyrics depict traditions by immigrants in Sweden, especially those from the Balkan Peninsula, like kebab pizza and slivovitza, as well as prejudices.

On 22 July 2008, the song was performed at SVT's Allsång på Skansen.

== Single ==
The single "Kebabpizza Slivovitza" was released on 20 February 2008, peaking at 2nd position at the Swedish singles chart.

On 2 March 2008 the song was tested for Svensktoppen but it failed to enter the chart.

=== Single track listing ===
1. Kebabpizza Slivovitza
2. Aldrig Lycklig
3. Kebabpizza Slivovitza (karaoke version)

== Chart performance ==
Chart (2008)	Peak position
Sweden (Sverigetopplistan)	2
