= Fronda =

Swedish rapper

- Born: Hans Sebastian Pasquale Fronda; 3 November 1981 (age 44); Hökåsen, Västerås, Sweden
- Musical career
- Origin: Hökåsen, Sweden
- Genre: Hip hop
- Occupations: Rapper; songwriter
- Instrument: Vocals
- Years active: 1999–present
- Labels: Fronda Music AB; 4 and a half AB
- Website: fronda.se

Hans Sebastian Pasquale Fronda (born 3 November 1981, Hökåsen, Västerås) is a Swedish hip-hop artist. He released his first studio album in 2004, and toured Sweden in summer 2006. He then took a time-out from doing live performances to work on his next album, Fridlysta Frekvenser. The first single from that album was released on 11 April 2007. He made his stage comeback on the televised radio-show Radiogalan on 29 April 2007, along with Markoolio, Emilia Rydberg, and Sunrise Avenue.

Jonas Stentäpp of Dala-Demokraten has described Fronda as "one of the most entertaining hip-hop artists" in Sweden for his "heavy beats, unusually interesting choruses, and good flow in the lyrics." Fronda participated in the 2008 Melodifestivalen with the song "Ingen mår så bra som jag", saying that his participation in the contest was "a step in the right direction for me both as a human and as an artist. [Being in Melodifestivalen is] the biggest thing you can experience as an artist in Sweden." The song reached eleventh place on the Swedish Singles Chart in March 2008. Fronda was originally going to compete with another song in the 2007 Melodifestivalen, but was disqualified when he refused to sing the song by himself. He also participated in the 2004 Swedish celebrity version of Fort Boyard.

== Discography ==
=== Solo Albums/demo ===
- Fortfarande Underjord (2003) Fronda's first solo demo
- En armé på två ben (2004) Fronda's official album
- Då Fronda Fortfarande Var Underjord (2004) Remaster of the solo demo
- Livet Genom En Pansarvagnspipa (2005) features artists such as Loreen, Stephen Simmonds, Kamphundar, Leafy, Olle Ljungström and Papa Dee
- Etiketten Är Musik (2006) features Madchild and Matth
- Fridlysta Frekvenser (2007) released under 'Bonnier Music' on 19 September 2007
- Generation Robot (2008) released for free on 10 December 2008
- Hypernova (2010) a compilation album of unreleased songs
- Svart Poesi (2010) sold and released digitally since 14 December 2010
- Tuggummi (2013)
- Väderkvarnsjättar (2014) sold and released digitally since Mars 2014
- Vintervägen (2015)
- Den ofärdiga svanen (2016)
- 811103 (2017)
- Ur en enda strupe kommer sanningen om alla (2017)
- Tolv månader (2018)
- Bubbelgum EP (2019)
- 2020 EP (2020)
- Dagsländor (2020) compilation album

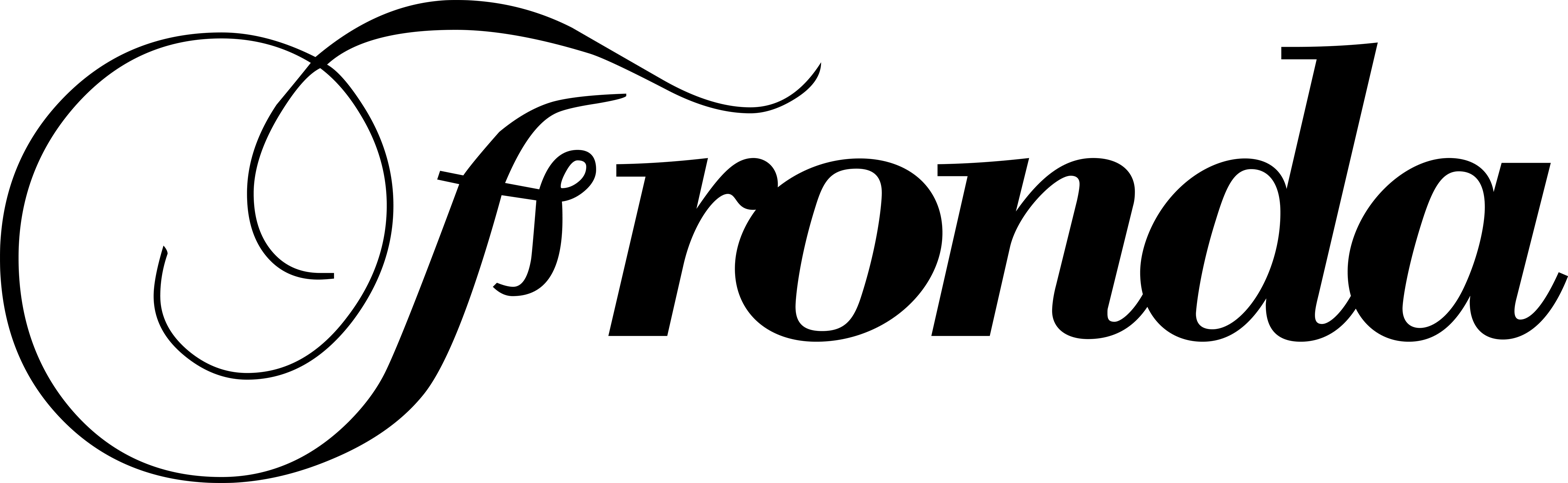
Fronda's logo

=== Non-solo Albums ===
- Negativa Apor (1999) together De 6 apornas armé
- Players & Pimpar (2001) demo songs with Ebola
- Kamphundar (2004) Album in collaboration with Kamphundar
- Pyramid (2016) Patrull album

=== EPs ===
- Världens Snabbaste EP (2006) EP with OB-1, released on Fronda's website
- Alla är komiker (2015) Patrull EP
- Chicago (2015) Patrull EP
