= Thank You (Amy Diamond song) =

Single by Amy Diamond

from the album Music in Motion (Gold Edition)
- A-side: "Thank You"
- Released: March 2008
- Genre: pop
- Songwriter(s): Sandra Nordström, Mathias Venge, Peter Wennerberg

Amy Diamond singles chronology
| "Stay My Baby" (2007) | "Thank You" (2008) | "It's My Life" (2009) |

"Thank You" is a song written by Sandra Nordström, Mathias Venge and Peter Wennerberg, and performed by Amy Diamond at Melodifestivalen 2008. The song participated in the first semifinal in Gothenburg on 9 February 2008 and headed directly to the finals, held inside the Stockholm Globe Arena on 15 March that year. Once there, the song ended up 8th.

The single peaked at number eight on the Swedish singles chart.

On 20 April 2008, the song was tested for Svensktoppen, which however failed.

== Charts ==
=== Weekly charts ===
| Chart (2008) | Peak position |
|---|---|
| Sweden (Sverigetopplistan) | 8 |

=== Year-end charts ===
| Chart (2008) | Position |
|---|---|
| Sweden (Sverigetopplistan) | 26 |
