= Patrik Isaksson (album) =

Studio album by Patrik Isaksson
- Released: 10 May 2006
- Genre: Pop
- Length: circa 44 minutes
- Label: Sony BMG Music Entertainment

Patrik Isaksson chronology
Vi som aldrig landat (2004)	Patrik Isaksson (2006)	10 år – En snäll mans bekännelser (2008)

Patrik Isaksson is the self-titled fourth studio album by Swedish pop singer Patrik Isaksson. It was released through Sony BMG Music Entertainment on 10 May 2006.

== Track listing ==
1. Innan klockan slår
2. Vår sista dag
3. Faller du så faller jag
4. Vi mot dom
5. Till min syster
6. Långt härifrån
7. Dansa om du törs
8. Vem är han
9. Älska mig som mest då
10. Det var längesen
11. Vinternatt

== Contributors ==
- Patrik Isaksson - singer, composer, song lyrics
- Jimmy Källkvist - bass
- Joacim Backman - guitar
- Björn Öqvist - piano
- Christer Jansson - drums

== Charts ==
=== Weekly charts ===
Chart (2006)	Peak position
Swedish Albums (Sverigetopplistan)	6

=== Year-end charts ===
Chart (2006)	Position
Swedish Albums (Sverigetopplistan)	67
