= Hallelujah New World =

Single by Eskobar
- A-side: "Hallelujah New World"
- Released: 2008
- Label: Gibulchi Records
- Songwriters: Daniel Bellqvist, Frederik Zäll, Robert Birming
- Producer: Pontus Frisk

Eskobar singles chronology
"As the World Turns" (February 2008)	"Hallelujah New World" (2008)

Hallelujah New World is a song written by Daniel Bellqvist, Frederik Zäll and Robert Birming, and recorded performed by Eskobar at Melodifestivalen 2008, participating in the third semifinal inside the Cloetta Center in Linköping on 23 February 2008, where the song ended up eight, and didn't made it further.

Escobar also released as a single in 2008, and it also appeared on their 2008 album Death in Athens. The single peaked at 55th position at the Swedish singles chart.

== Charts ==
Chart (2008)	Peak position
Sweden (Sverigetopplistan)	55
