= Calaisa =

Swedish band

- Origin: Malmö, Sweden
- Genres: country pop, Irish folk music
- Years active: 21st century
- Past members: Caisa, Lisa Troedsson, Malin, Anna Törnquist

Calaisa is a quartet from the town of Malmö in Sweden. It consists of the sisters, Caisa and Lisa Troedsson and the sisters Malin and Anna Törnquist. The band participated at Melodifestivalen 2008 with the song If I Could, which was knocked out during the Karlskrona competition on 1 March 2008.

Calaisa has released several albums.

== Discography ==
=== Albums ===
- Calaisa - 2006
- Grafton Street - 2009
- Up to Us - 2012
