= Hökåsen =

- Location within Västmanland Location within Sweden
- Coordinates: 59°40′N 16°35′E
- Country: Sweden
- Province: Västmanland
- County: Västmanland County
- Municipality: Västerås Municipality

Area
  - Total: 1.76 km^{2} (0.68 sq mi)

Population (31 December 2010)
  - Total: 2,956
  - Density: 1,677/km^{2} (4,340/sq mi)
- Time zone: UTC+1 (CET)
  - Summer (DST): UTC+2 (CEST)

Hökåsen is a locality situated in Västerås Municipality, Västmanland County, Sweden with 2,956 inhabitants in 2010.
