= Under mitt tunna skinn =

2008 song by Patrik Isaksson

Single by Patrik Isaksson

from the album 10 år – En snäll mans bekännelser
- A-side: "Under mitt tunna skinn"
- Released: 28 February 2008
- Genre: pop
- Label: King Island Roxystars Recordings
- Songwriter: Patrik Isaksson

Patrik Isaksson singles chronology
"Du som tog mitt hjärta" (2007)	"Under mitt tunna skinn" (2008)	"Eldon" (2008)

"Under mitt tunna skinn" is a song written by Patrik Isaksson, and performed by himself at Melodifestivalen 2008, where it participated in the second semi-final inside the Cloetta Center in Linköping. The song was released as a single on 28 February 2008 and it entered Svensktoppen on 16 March 2008.

== Contributors ==
- Patrik Isaksson – song, composer, lyrics
- Johan Röhr – piano
- Joacim Backman – guitar
- Jimmy Källqvist – bass

== Charts ==
Chart (2008)	Peak position
Sweden (Sverigetopplistan)	10
