= If I Could (Calaisa song) =

Single by Calaisa
- A-side: "If I Could"
- Released: 2008
- Recorded: Sandkvie Studio and Musicano Studio, Visby, Sweden
- Genre: Country pop
- Label: M&L Records
- Songwriters: Pontus Assarsson; Jörgen Ringqvist; Lisa Troedsson-Lundin; Caisa Troedsson-Lundin; Anna Törnqvist; Malin Törnqvist

If I Could is a song written by Pontus Assarsson, Jörgen Ringqvist, Lisa Troedsson-Lundin, Caisa Troedsson-Lundin, Anna Törnqvist och Malin Törnqvist. The song was originally performed during the fourth semifinal of Melodifestivalen 2008 in Karlskrona by Calaisa, but didn't make it further in the contest.

The song received a Svensktoppen test for two weeks in a row, but failed to enter chart.

The country pop song is about losing a loved person, and be ready to do anything to get him or her back.

== Contributors ==
- Pontus Assarsson - guitar, producer
- Jörgen Ringqvist - guitar, drums, percussion, programming, producer
- Roger Gustafsson - steelguitar

== Charts ==
Chart (2008)	Peak position
Sweden (Sverigetopplistan)	32
