= Vi som aldrig landat =

Studio album by Patrik Isaksson
- Released: 28 January 2004
- Recorded: Polar Studios, Stockholm, Sweden
- Genre: pop
- Length: 52 minutes
- Label: Sony Music Entertainment Sweden

Patrik Isaksson chronology
Tillbaks på ruta 1 (2001)	Vi som aldrig landat (2004)	Patrik Isaksson (2006)

Vi som aldrig landat is a 2004 Patrik Isaksson studio album.

== Track listing ==
1. 1985
2. En chans till
3. Vi som aldrig landat
4. Innan dagen gryr
5. Kom med mig hem
6. Det kunde varit jag
7. Min tur
8. Balladen om ensamhet
9. Som på film
10. Låtsasvärld
11. Slå sig fri
12. Sommarrush

== Charts ==
Chart (2004)	Peak position
Swedish Albums (Sverigetopplistan)	9
