= Upp o hoppa =

Single by Frida Muranius featuring Headline
- Released: 2008
- Songwriters: Frida Muranius, Sam Persson, Anderz Wrethov

"Upp o hoppa" is a song performed by Frida Muranius at Melodifestivalen 2008. The song, which was changed from the working title Leva livet, was performed by Frida Muranius, singer from Scania, and Headline (Larimar Krokvik), rapper from Sala. The song participated in the third semi-final on 23 February 2008, reaching the final inside the Stockholm Globe Arena on 15 March the same year.

In the final, the song scored six points from the jury in Malmö, ending up 10th.

== Single ==
The single "Upp o hoppa" was released on 12 March 2008, peaking at 9th position at the Swedish singles chart. On 30 March 2008, the song entered Svensktoppen, reaching the 9th position before ending up knocked out of the chart the upcoming week.

=== Track listing ===
1. Upp o hoppa (single version)
2. Upp o hoppa (PJ Harmony remix)
3. Upp o hoppa (PJ Harmony club remix)
4. Upp o hoppa (karaoke version)

== Chart performance ==
Chart (2008)	Peak position
Sweden (Sverigetopplistan)	9
