= I lågornas sken =

Single by Nordman
- A-side: "I lågornas sken"
- B-side: "Längtan" (with Jessica Andersson)
- Released: March 2008
- Genre: ethnopop
- Label: Folkpop Records
- Songwriters: Mårten Eriksson, Lina Eriksson

Nordman singles chronology
"Du behöver" (2007)	"I lågornas sken" (2008)	"Hon är redan här" (2008)

I lågornas sken is a song written by Mårten and Lina Eriksson, and performed by Nordman. The song was appointed for Melodifestivalen 2008, and participated in the second semifinal, in Karlskrona on 1 March 2008. From there, it made it to Andra chansen the upcoming week, from where it made it to the finals defeating Häggkvist & Johnson's One Love and Suzzie Tappers Visst finns mirakel. In the final, inside the Stockholm Globe Arena on 15 March 2008, the song finished in sixth place. The song was also released as a single.

The lyrics describe 17th century witch processes, where women were accused of being witches. The Nordman members said during an interview before the contest that the message meant to be shown was how wrong things may end by spreading false rumors. The performance included a stage show, symbolizing the witch burnings at the stake, by a female dancer standing between artificial flames.

During the period 4–25 May 2008, the song charted at Svensktoppen for four weeks, with positions 7-7-9-9. The song also became the 80th most successful Trackslistan song of 2008.

The music video was directed by Owe Lingvall.

== Charts ==
Chart (2008)	Peak position
Sweden	6
