= Frida Appelgren =

Swedish singer (born 1981)

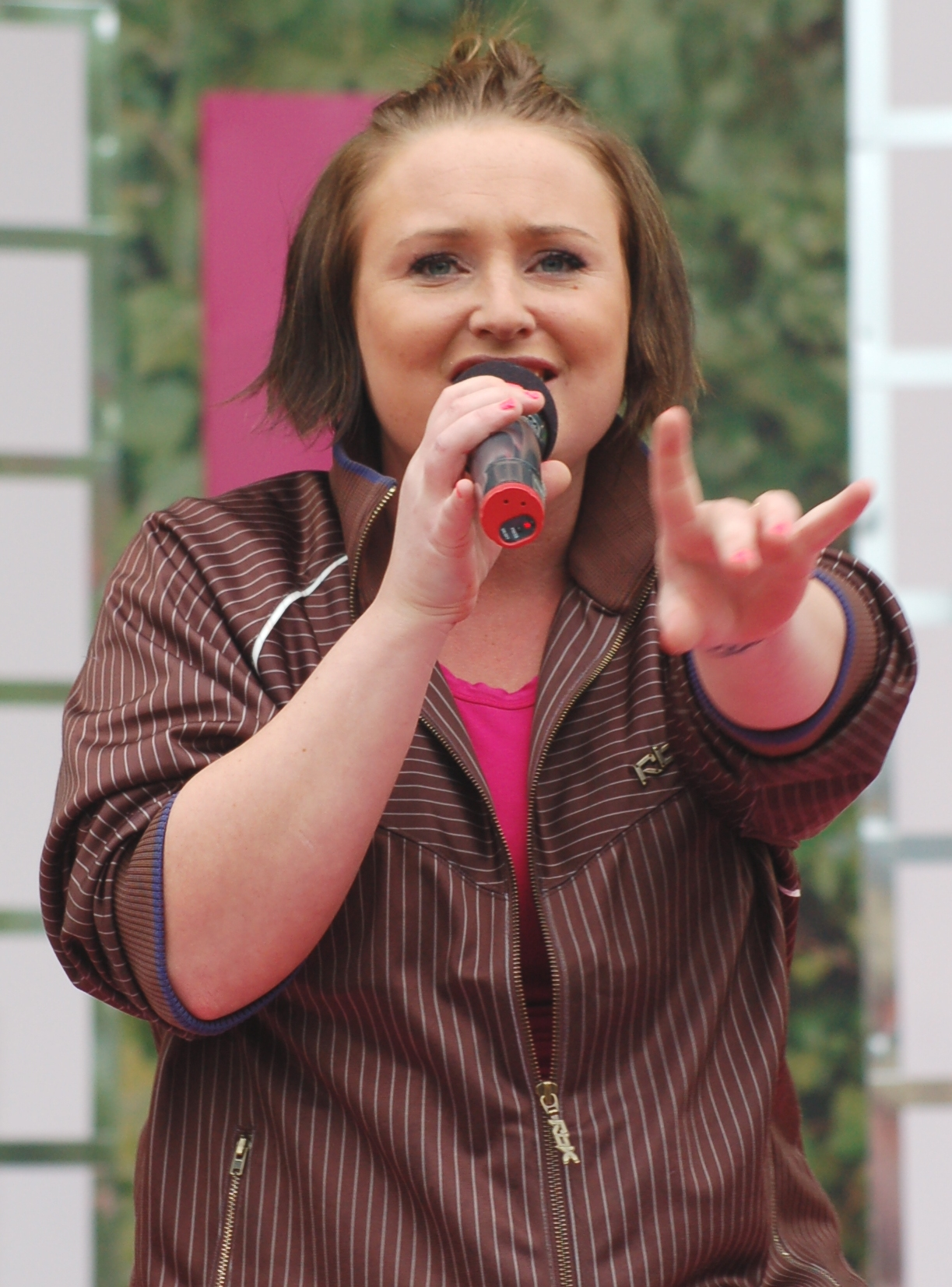

Background information
- Born: Frida Muranius; 5 April 1981 (age 44); Malmö, Sweden
- Genres: Pop
- Occupation: Singer
- Years active: 2007–present

Frida Erika Appelgren, earlier married Muranius, born 5 April 1981 in Malmö, Sweden, is a Swedish music artist scoring a mid-2007 hit with the song Dunka mig gul och blå.

Together with Headline she participated at Melodifestivalen 2008 with the song Upp o hoppa, which ended up 10th in the finals.

== Discography ==
- Gasen I Botten (rap. Mange; Magnus Rytterstam)
- Hoppa upp
- 2007 – Dunka mig gul och blå
- 2008 – Upp och hoppa
- 2014 – Hit and Run
