= Ainbusk =

Swedish vocal group

- Origin: Gotland, Sweden
- Genres: Pop, folk
- Years active: 1983–present
- Labels: Mono Music; Stockholm Records/ Universal
- Members: Annelie Roswall; Bigitta Jakobsson
- Past members: Josefin Nilsson; Marie Nilsson Lind
- Website: ainbusk.com

Ainbusk are a pop/folk vocal group from Gotland, Sweden. Formed in 1983, Ainbusk are best known for their single "Jag mötte Lassie" ("I Met Lassie") – frequently referred to simply as "Lassie" – which was the Christmas chart-topper in Sweden in 1990. They have released four studio albums, one live album and one compilation. Their music mixes pop with traditional Swedish influences; they have also recorded Swedish versions of English-language songs. In 2008, they participated unsuccessfully in the Swedish Eurovision Song Contest selection, Melodifestivalen.

== Early career and "Lassie" ==
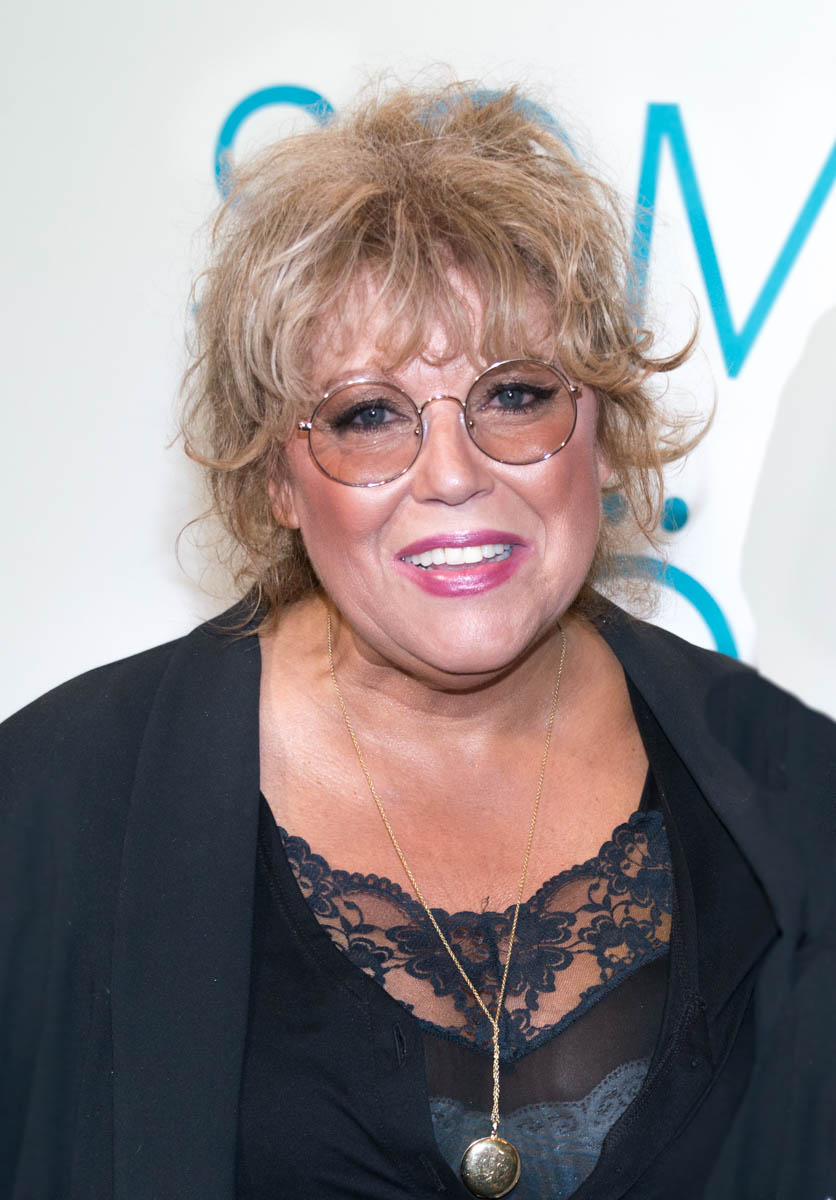
Group member Marie Nilsson Lind in 2019

Formed on the island of Gotland, Ainbusk first attracted attention in 1984 when they won a talent show, Talang-84, in Stockholm. They spent the remainder of the 1980s touring and establishing their reputation. Their breakthrough came in 1990 when band member Marie Nilsson Lind collaborated with former ABBA member Benny Andersson to write several songs, with Andersson providing the music for Lind's lyrics. The first single issued, "Jag mötte Lassie", with its touching lyrics about a lonely little girl, struck a chord with record buyers and became the Christmas/New Year #1 on the Swedish singles chart. The follow-up, "Älska mej", also sold well and both tracks remain popular.

== Later career ==
Ainbusk spent the early 1990s honing their stage act – they became known for injecting elements of humour into their performances – and the result was a 1993 live album Från när till fjärran (From Near and Far), including Varje steg du tar (a version of Sting's "Every Breath You Take"). The group's first studio album, the self-titled Ainbusk, was released in 1998, followed by Stolt (Proud) in 2000. A Christmas album, I midvintertid: En jul på Gotland came out in 2001 and included versions of "Fairytale of New York", "Fields of Gold" and "Forever Young". The group's fourth album, Skynda att älska (Rush to Love) appeared in 2002 and Ainbusk celebrated their 20th anniversary in 2003 with the release of En samling, a career retrospective also featuring three new tracks.

Josefin Nilsson died in 2016. Her sister Marie died on 4 January 2024, at the age of 62.

== Melodifestivalen ==
In 2008, Ainbusk were announced as one of the participants in Melodifestivalen with the song "Jag saknar dig ibland" ("I Miss You Sometimes"). They participated in the third semifinal, held in Linköping on 23 February 2008, but a sixth-place finish meant they were eliminated from the competition.

== Discography ==
=== Albums ===
- 1998: Ainbusk - SWE #21
- 2000: Stolt
- 2001: I midvintertid, en jul på Gotland
- 2002: Skynda att älska

=== Live albums ===
- 1993: Från när till fjärran

=== Compilations ===
- 2003: En samling (reissued in 2008 with additional track)

=== Singles ===
- 1998: "Min gud" - SWE #56
- 2008: "Jag saknar dig ibland" - SWE #36
- 2008: "Skynda att älska" - SWE #13

Title	Year	Peak chart positions	Album
Title	Year	SWE	Album
"Älska Mig"	2019	86	Non-album single
