= Arena Arctica =

Hangar in Kiruna, Sweden

Coordinates: 67°49′20″N 20°19′36″E

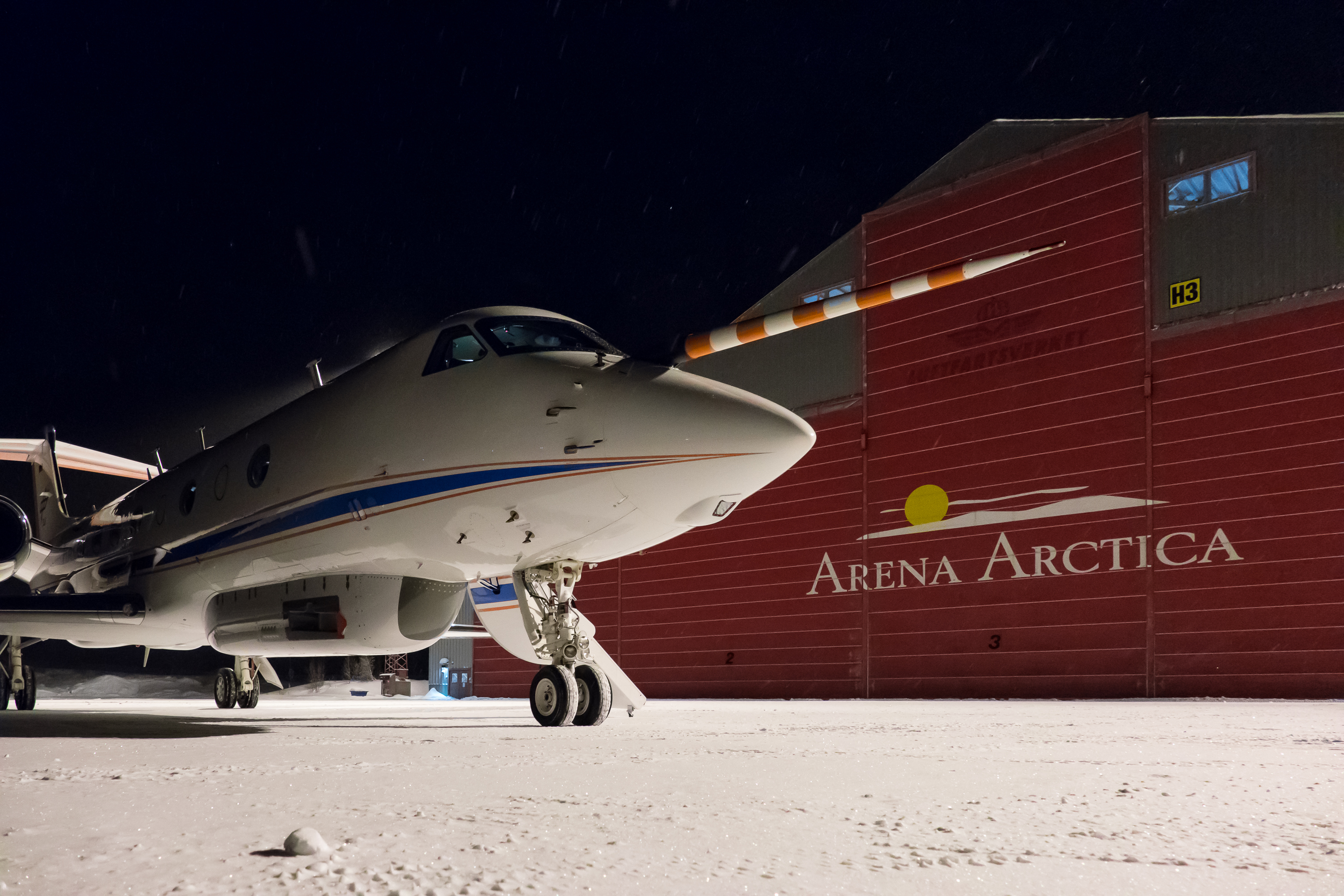
Arena Arctica

Arena Arctica is a hangar in Kiruna Airport for fixed-wing aircraft and events in Kiruna, Sweden. The arena hosted the Second chance round of Melodifestivalen 2008.

== Other websites ==
- Official site
