= Björn Gustafsson =

Swedish comedian and actor (born 1986)

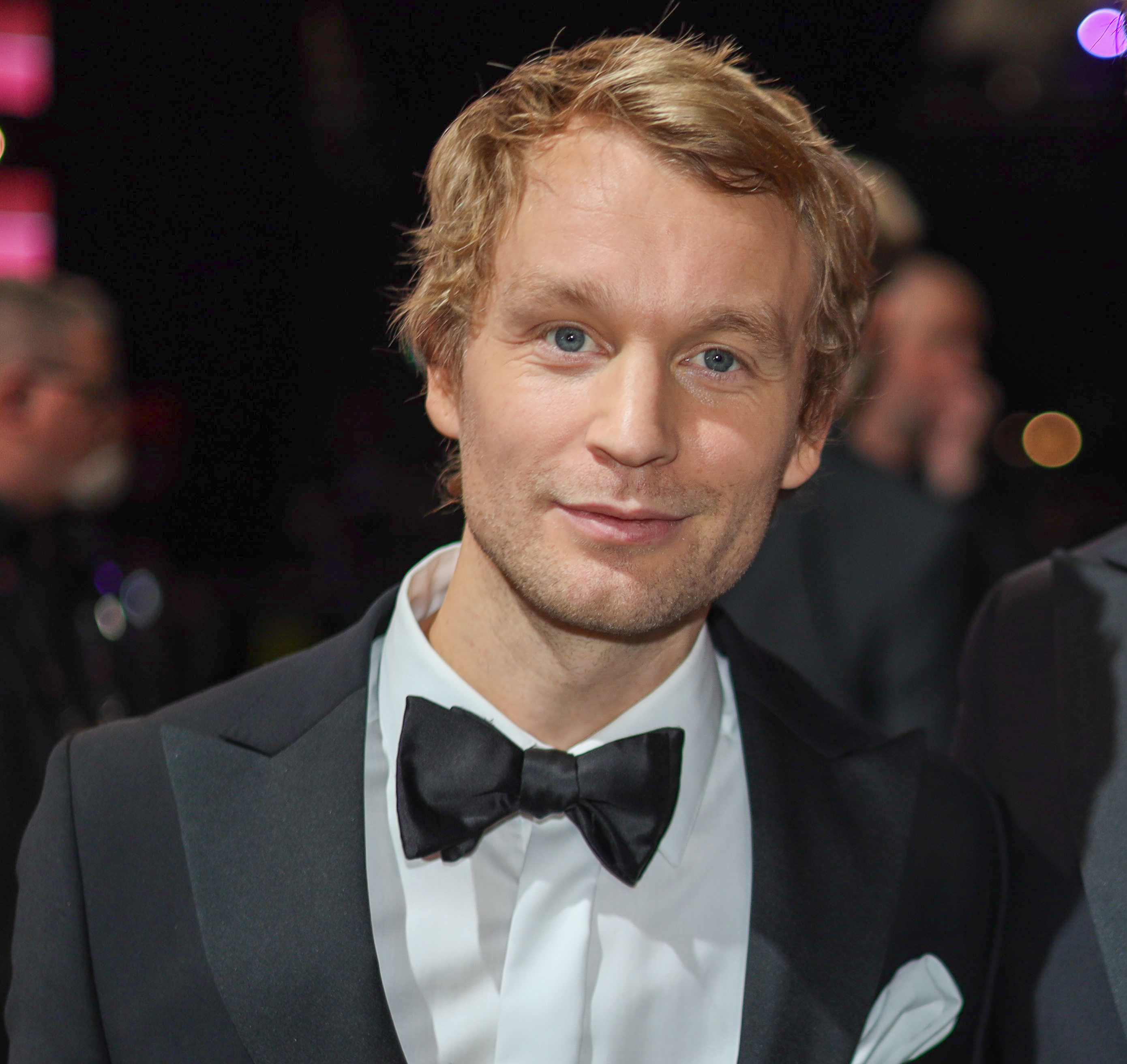
- Gustafsson in 2024
- Born: Lars Björn Gustafsson; 19 February 1986 (age 40); Romelanda, Sweden
- Occupations: Actor, comedian
- Years active: 2005–present
- Website: www.bjorngustafsson.se

Lars Björn Gustafsson (born 19 February 1986) is a Swedish comedian and actor. He is known from TV shows such as Parlamentet and Stockholm Live.

== Early and personal life ==
Gustafsson was born in Gothenburg, Sweden. He studied at the Calle Flygares Theater School in Stockholm to become an actor. His film debut came in 2006 with the Swedish movie Beck – Flickan i jordkällaren. But before his debut as an actor, he had already debuted in 2005 as a stand-up comedian at Bungy Comedy, a Swedish club for stand-up beginners. In 2006 he enrolled at Standup Star, a stand-up school, where among others, Özz Nûjen and Jakob Öqvist, two of the most well-known comedians in Sweden, have attended.

== Career ==
In 2008, he appeared on Melodifestivalen 2008, the Swedish selections for the Eurovision Song Contest, receiving great media attention as he sang a love song to host Kristian Luuk's girlfriend Carina Berg. Afterward, Berg said that she had to hide her cheeks so people could not see that she was blushing. Gustafsson would later also announce the Swedish votes at the Eurovision Song Contest.

Gustafsson gained a certain degree of international fame following a World of Warcraft (WoW) joke in Parlamentet, talking about people wasting time on the internet and not contributing to their party's effort by playing inefficiently, using so much internal WoW terminology himself that he was incomprehensible to non-players. The scene was spread over the Internet, mainly on YouTube, where translations into other languages could also be found.

Gustafsson got voted as Sweden's funniest man by Aftonbladet's readers on 6 March 2008. He continued his "stand-up" shows at the big stage, in the 44th Guldbagge Awards in 2009 together with Johan Glans, and with Robert Gustafsson in the Svenska idrottsgalan 2009 (Swedish athletics awards) where he also presented the nominations for rookie of the year.

In 2016 and 2017, he played the role of Don in the American comedy television series People of Earth.

He took on the role of entertainer again for Melodifestivalen 2024, hosted by Carina Berg.

== Filmography ==
=== Films ===
- Beck – Flickan i jordkällaren (2006)
- Les Grandes Personnes (2008)
- Kenny Begins (2009)
- Björn Gustafsson: A life's Work
- Tina og Bettina The Movie
- Kronjuvelerna (2011)
- Cockpit (2012)
- Spy (2015)
- Kung Fury (2015)
- Becoming Astrid (2018)
- The Penguin Lessons (2024)

=== Television shows ===
- Eurovision Song Contest 2008
- Melodifestivalen 2008 (pause act)
- Parlamentet
- Extra! Extra!
- Tack gode gud
- Morgonsoffan
- Sverige pussas och kramas
- Stockholm Live
- Idol
- Hål i väggen
- Kontoret
- Julkalendern: Barna Hedenhös uppfinner julen
- Söder om Folkungagatan
- The Comedians (one episode as Jonas)
- People of Earth (Don)
- Melodifestivalen 2024 (pause act)

== Discography ==
=== Singles ===
List of singles
Title	Year	Peak chart positions
Title	Year	SWE
"Still the One"	2024	15

== Awards ==
- Swedish Funniest Man 2008 by the newspaper Aftonbladet.
