= Sibel Redžep =

Swedish pop singer (born 1987)

Sibel Redžep Сибел Реџеп
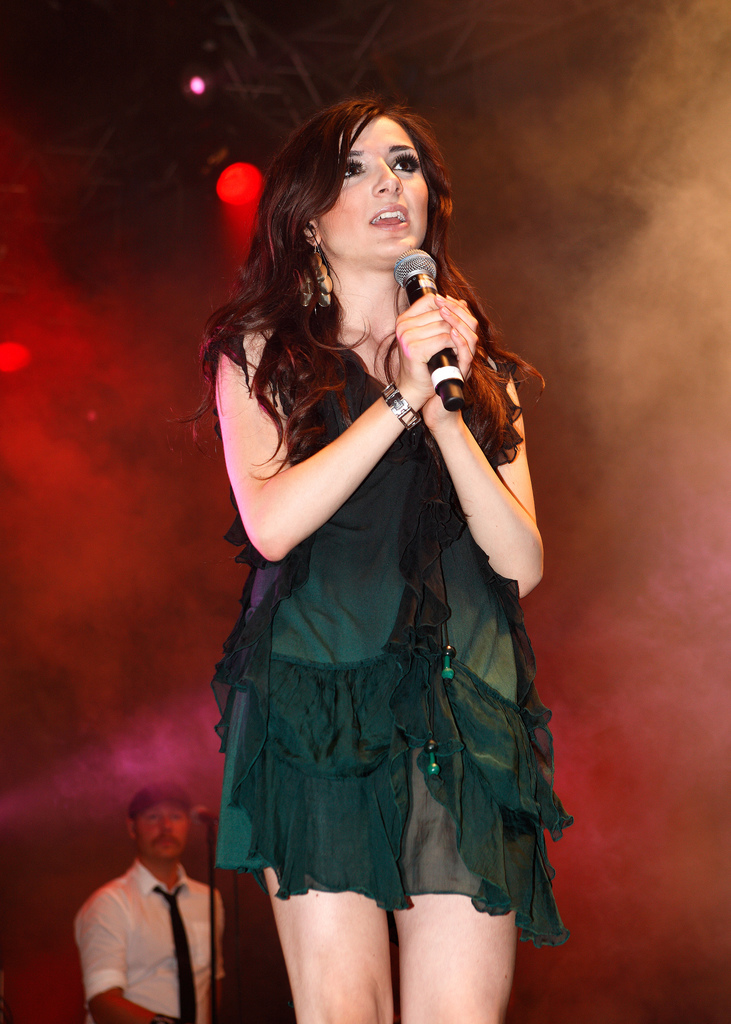
- Sibel Redžep in May 2008 during the Rix FM Festival in Jönköping, Sweden

Background information
- Born: 12 December 1987 (age 38); Radoviš, SR Macedonia, SFR Yugoslavia
- Origin: Kristianstad, Sweden
- Genres: Pop, rock, ambient, house
- Occupation: Singer
- Instrument: Vocals
- Years active: 2008–present
- Labels: Warner Bros. Records, Warner Music Sweden (2008–present)
- Website: sibel.se

Sibel Redžep (Turkish: Sibel Recep, Macedonian: Сибел Реџеп; born 12 December 1987) is a Macedonian-born Swedish pop singer. She is known from the Swedish television show Idol 2005, where she was the second runner up. She was also a semi-finalist of Idol 2004, where she placed fourth in her group but didn't make it to the finals.

Before she joined the show she lived in Kristianstad, Sweden. Sibel speaks Swedish, Turkish, Macedonian, English, French and a little Chinese and German. She was also the background vocalist for the 2009 hit single "It's Alright, It's OK" by Ashley Tisdale.

== Early life ==
She was born in Radoviš in the mountains of southeastern North Macedonia, then Yugoslavia, to a Macedonian Turkish family. Her family lived in the nearby small Macedonian village of Topolnica.

In 2004, 16-year-old Redžep entered Swedish talent contest Idol. She sang "Beautiful" by Christina Aguilera, reducing the usually hard-faced judge Peter Swartling to tears. The following year, she was beaten to the final by Agnes Carlsson and Sebastian Karlsson.

== Career ==
Sibel's management team includes "Idol" judge Peter Swartling, who immediately after the loss of Sibel in the penultimate round of Idol 2005. Swartling stood to his word and in the summer of 2006, he started work with Sibel in the studio with songwriter/producer Christian Antblad in Dublin. With Sibel at the microphone it was decided that they would work with big ballads for her voice. One of the ballads, "How I Tried To Let You Go" was originally a small idea for a chorus sung by Sibel over the phone, which was taken to the studio where Christian and Peter immediately fell for it. With a total of about thirty songs recorded, Sibel returned to the home town of Kristianstad to graduate from high school.

=== Melodifestivalen 2008 ===
Redžep participated in Melodifestivalen 2008 with the ballad "That Is Where I'll Go", in the last semi-final, where she advanced to "Andra chansen" (second chance), and subsequently made it to the finals. In hope of representing Sweden at Eurovision Song Contest 2008 in Belgrade, Serbia. She was lost to Charlotte Perrelli, who later represented Sweden in the Eurovision 2008.

Since the show Sibel has released her album The Diving Belle and two singles, "That Is Where I'll Go" and "Make Believe. There are plans to release her debut album in her native language, Turkish.

=== Melodifestivalen 2010 ===
Redžep participated in Melodifestivalen 2010 with the song "Stop". She performed in semi-final 4, held on 27 February. The song was written by Mikaela Stenström and Dimitri Stassos. She competed for the chance to represent Sweden at the Eurovision Song Contest, but she failed, as she only placed 7th.

=== Shake It Up 2010 ===
In 2010, Sibel Redžep recorded the song "Our Generation" for Disney Channel's TV series Shake It Up, which is featured on the soundtrack Shake It Up: Break It Down.

=== Songwriting ===
Sibel is also a songwriter signed to BMG after several years of songwriting at Warner Chappell. Since 2014 she's mostly writing songs for other artists. She has sung backing vocals on Ariana Grande's hit singles Into You, Love Me Harder, and Bad Decisions; Carly Rae Jepsen's Run Away With Me; and other artists such as Victoria Justice, Ashley Tisdale and Hilary Duff. Sibel is frequently between Stockholm and Los Angeles writing songs.

== Discography ==
Sibel Redzep discography
- Studio albums: 1
- Singles: 2
- Music videos: 2
- B-sides: 1

=== Albums ===
Year	Information	Sweden	Sales and Certifications
2008	The Diving Belle: First studio album; Released: 12 March 2008; Label: Warner Bros. Records; Format: CD	9	^{Swedish sales: 22,000 (Gold)}

=== Singles ===
Year	Song	Sweden	Certification	Album
2008	"That Is Where I'll Go"	6	—	The Diving Belle
2008	"Make Believe"	56	—	The Diving Belle
2008	"Walking Away"	Promo	—	The Diving Belle
2009	"I'm Sorry"	—	—	The Diving Belle
2010	"Stop"	27	—	TBA
2010	"The Fall" (feat. Lazee)	—	—	TBA
Featured Singles
2010	"United As One" (with Alex Sayz)	—	—	Single Only
2011	"Wake Up"	—	—	

=== Also contributes at ===
- 19 October 2005 – My Own Idol – Idol 2005
