= That Is Where I'll Go =

Single by Sibel

from the album The Diving Belle
- B-side: "That Is Where I'll Go" (Instrumental)
- Released: 9 March 2008 (Sweden)
- Recorded: 2007
- Genre: Pop
- Label: Warner Bros./Warner/Chappel
- Songwriter: Christian Antblad
- Producer: Christian Antblad

Sibel singles chronology
"That Is Where I'll Go" (2008)	"Make Believe" (2008)

"That Is Where I'll Go" is the debut single from singer Sibel Redžep. The song, written by Christian Antblad with strings from the Scandinavian Strings Orchestra, was Sibel Redžep's entry in Melodifestivalen 2008, the Swedish national contest which decides their Eurovision entry. The song did not win but did advance to the grand final. On 27 April 2008, the song was tested for Svensktoppen, but failed to enter.

== Track listing ==
1. "That Is Where I'll Go"
2. "That Is Where I'll Go" (Instrumental)

== Chart performance ==
The single was released on 5 March 2008. It stayed on the official Swedish charts for a total of nine weeks, from 13 March to 8 May 2008, peaking at number six on April 3.

== Song credits ==
- Music, lyrics, production, and mixing: Chris Antblad
- Publisher: Warner/Chappell Music Scandinavia AB (STIN)
- Guitar: Cem Köksal
- String arrangement: Dan Evmark
- String recording: Tobias Lindell
- String performance: Scandinavian Strings Orchestra
- Backing vocals: Caroline Antblad, Chris Antblad

== Charts ==
Chart (2008)	Peak position
Sweden (Sverigetopplistan)	23
