= Nordman =

Swedish folk rock musical duo

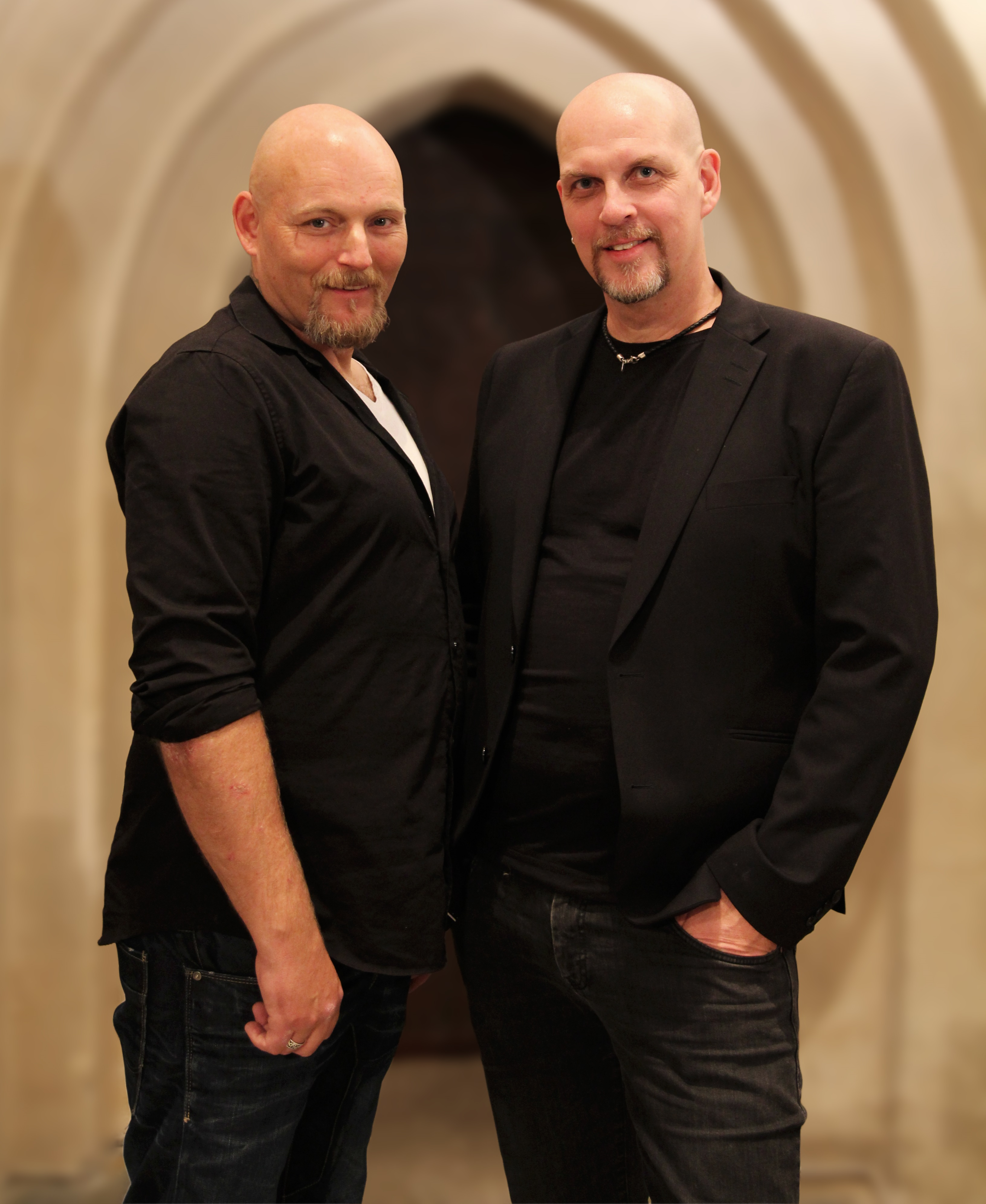

Background information
- Origin: Sweden
- Genres: neo folk rock
- Years active: 1994–1998; 2004–present
- Members: Håkan Hemlin; Mats Wester
- Website: www.nordman.nu

Nordman is a Swedish duo founded in 1993, that mixes folk music with rock and pop. This genre is called etnorock or folk rock in Swedish. The group consists of Håkan Hemlin, as singer and frontman, and Mats Wester, who plays the nyckelharpa, as well as serving as the main songwriter.

The group's biggest hits were "Förlist" (Shipwrecked) and "Vandraren" (The Wanderer). The group split up in 1998 because of the lead singer's drug problem, but reunited in 2004. They made a comeback in the Swedish Melodifestivalen with the song "Ödet var min väg" (Fate was my way) and released a comeback album called Anno 2005 in 2005. In 2008, they competed once again in Melodifestivalen with the song "I lågornas sken" and finished in sixth place behind winner Charlotte Perrelli. Nordman's song "Vandraren" was covered by Blackmore's Night on their 2010 album Autumn Sky and by Ensiferum on their 2009 album From Afar.

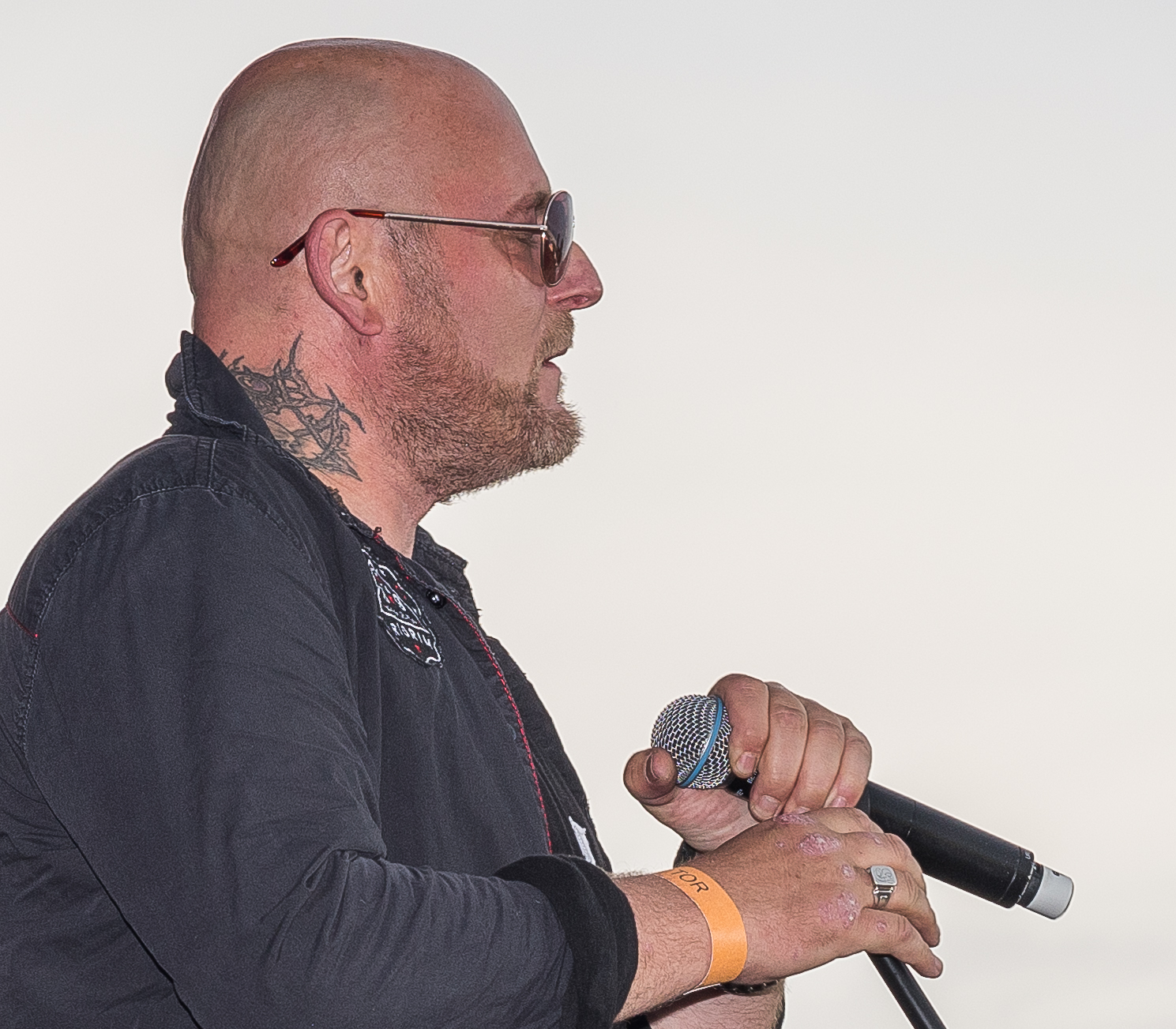
Håkan Hemlin at Stockholm Pride 2015

== History ==
=== 1991–1993 ===
Hemlin and Wester met in a studio in Hjorthagen in 1991. Hemlin was there with his rock band Bye Bye to record a demo to a promo-CD. Wester had for some years been experimenting with blending folk and pop and searched for a vocalist to the project. He asked Hemlin if he was interested to try some, and he was. Experiments began after a few hits came the embryo of what would become the song "Förlist" (wrecked). Gradually added another demos and autumn of 1993 it was time to check if any record company wanted to do an album with the new, completely unknown group Nordman.

=== 1994 ===
Sonet Records showed interest and signed Nordman. Then work began on the first album. In February 1994, released first single "Förlist" (wrecked). The album was released in late April of that year. Already after four weeks, the album was recorded for gold record (at that time was 50 000 copies). The second single "The Wanderer" went straight to Sommartoppen's first place, and remained there all summer. During the summer, the album also crossed the border for platinum (100 000 copies). Nordman toured in Sweden, more or less nonstop for a year. Two singles were released from the album, "Laglöst land" (Lawless Land) and "Ännu glöder solen" (The sun still glows) The latter peaked at number one on the Swedish Singles Chart in 1995.

=== 1995–1996 ===
Just one year after their debut album, on 22 November 1995, the band released their second album, Ingenmansland (No Man's Land). The album was pre-ordered in over 100 000 copies, meaning it was certified platinum before it was even released. The song "Be Mig" (Ask Me) became a hit on the radio. In the spring of 1996, Nordman performed at Cirkus arena in Stockholm. The concert was filmed and broadcast by TV4 and was subsequently released in stores as a VHS. The summer tour consisted of festival appearances around the country.

=== 1997 ===
Spring and summer of 1997 were spent writing material for another album. Autumn 1997 was the album Här och nu (Here and Now) set. It was finished later in the fall and was released in November of that year. Like Ingenmansland, the album was pre-ordered in over 100 000 copies, and thus certified platinum. Promotional work was done during November–December. In January 1998, Nordman took a break.

=== 2004–2005 ===
It would be seven years before Hemlin and Wester met again. Their friendship was built up and eventually led to a restart of songwriting and studio work. After the summer of 2004 Hemlin and Wester seriously started picking up the work of Nordman again. Bonnier Amigo became the new record company to contract the group. The first official appearance was in Melodifestivalen 2005 with the song "Ödet var min väg" (Fate was my path). A new album was recorded between January and April 2005. The album was released on 27 April 2005. During the summer of 2005, Nordman toured again in Sweden.

=== 2006–2007 ===
Nordman went back into the studio to write new songs for another album. During November–December 2006, Nordman toured with Julgalan Norrland. A highly acclaimed performance, in which Håkan Hemlin among other things performed an unexpected Motown-medley with Brolle Jr., Roger Pontare and Chris Lind wearing white jackets. In the autumn of 2007 Nordman toured in clubs around Sweden. On 24 October 2007 Nordman released a new single, "Du Behöver" (You Need).

=== 2008 ===
In early January, Nordman released the radio single "Längtan" (Longing), a duet with Jessica Anderson from the upcoming album Djävul eller gud (Devil or God). Nordman participated in Melodifestivalen with the song "I lågornas sken" (In light of the flames), written by Lina Eriksson and Mårten Eriksson. In race number four in Karlskrona, March 1, Nordman became eligible to the second chance round in Kiruna, which was held the following week. After a game exclusion with Andreas and Carola and then Suzzie Tapper, Nordman went on to the finale in Globen. In the finale, Nordman finished in sixth place.

=== 2013 ===
During a recording session at Wester's home, Nordman recorded their first song to be released in English, "Dance To the Loop". The song was first set to never be released, but as the duo found it funny, they created a promotional video in a couple of hours and released it as a download on iTunes and for streaming on Spotify.

=== 2014 ===
February saw the light of a new album, Patina. The album consisted of acoustic versions of some of the band's most famous songs, a couple old favorites and some new compositions. The line-up was Håkan Hemlin, Mats Wester, Claudia Müller (flutist) and Dani Strömbeck (pianist). During February, The line-up subsequently made a tour in Sweden from north to south, mostly playing in churches and small concert-halls.

=== 2016 ===
Nordman is on hiatus while they both have their own projects. Mats conducts a world tour with Joe Bonamassa as part of the band.

=== 2019 ===
The new single "Glöm det som var" is released and is followed up with an album, "Tänk om". The band also celebrates 25 years and gives two anniversary concerts in December.

=== 2020 ===
Nordman is once again on hiatus due to the pandemic.

=== 2022 ===
Nordman takes part of the Swedish realityshow Så mycket bättre and release new singles. New tour is set in spring 2023 and also their third participation in Melodifestivalen 2023 in february 2023

== Discography ==
=== Albums ===
Studio albums

Year	Album	Translation of title	Peak positions	Certification
Year	Album	Translation of title	SWE	Certification
1994	Nordman		1	GLF: 5× Platinum
1995	Ingenmansland	No Man's Land	1	GLF: Platinum
1997	Här och nu	Here and Now	5	
2005	Anno 2005	Year 2005	8	
2008	Djävul eller Gud	Devil or God	3	
2010	Korsväg	Crossroad	8	
2014	Patina	Patina	34	
2019	Tänk om	What If	8	

Compilation albums

Year	Album	Translation of title	Peak positions	Certification
Year	Album	Translation of title	SWE	Certification
2001	Nordmans bästa – I vandrarens spår	Best of Nordman – In the Wanderer's Footprints	36	
2004	Bästa	Best of	–	
2004	Pärlor (collection)	Pearls	–	

=== Singles ===
Singles are adapted from Spotify.

Year	Single	Peak positions	Album
Year	Single	SWE	Album
1994	"Förlist"	5	Nordman
1994	"Vandraren"	7	Nordman
1994	"Laglöst land"	40	Nordman
1995	"Ännu glöder solen"	–	Ingenmansland
1995	"Be mig"	12	Ingenmansland
1996	"På mossen"	–	Ingenmansland
1996	"Det sista du ser"	–	Ingenmansland
1996	"Live-singel"	–	
1997	"Se dig själv"	–	Här och nu
1998	"Hjälp mig att leva"	26	Här och nu
2005	"Ödet var min väg"	10	Anno 2005
2005	"Allt eller ingenting"	–	Anno 2005
2007	"Du behöver"	6	Djävul eller Gud
2007	"I lågornas sken"	6	Djävul eller Gud
2008	"Hon är redan här"	–	Djävul eller Gud
2008	"Om Gud var jag"	6	Korsväg
2013	"Dance to the loop"	–	Non-album singles
2016	"Vår igen"	–	Non-album singles
2016	"Tagga ner"	–	Non-album singles
2016	"Tiden har talat"	–	Non-album singles
2016	"Hallelujah"	–	Non-album singles
2017	"Dag och natt"	–	Non-album singles
2019	"Glöm Det som Var"	–	Tänk om
2019	"Trasiga själar (Radio Edit)"	–	Non-album singles
2022	"Vi kan vinna"	– (Note: "Vi kan vinna" did not enter the Swedish Singellista Chart, but peaked at number 20 on the Swedish Heatseeker Chart.)	Non-album singles
2023	"Släpp alla sorger"	7	Non-album singles

Featured in

Year	Single	Peak positions	Album
Year	Single	SWE	Album
2007	"Livet som en värsting" (Rastegar feat. Nordman)	6	
