= Lasse Lindh =

Swedish indie pop musician (born 1974)

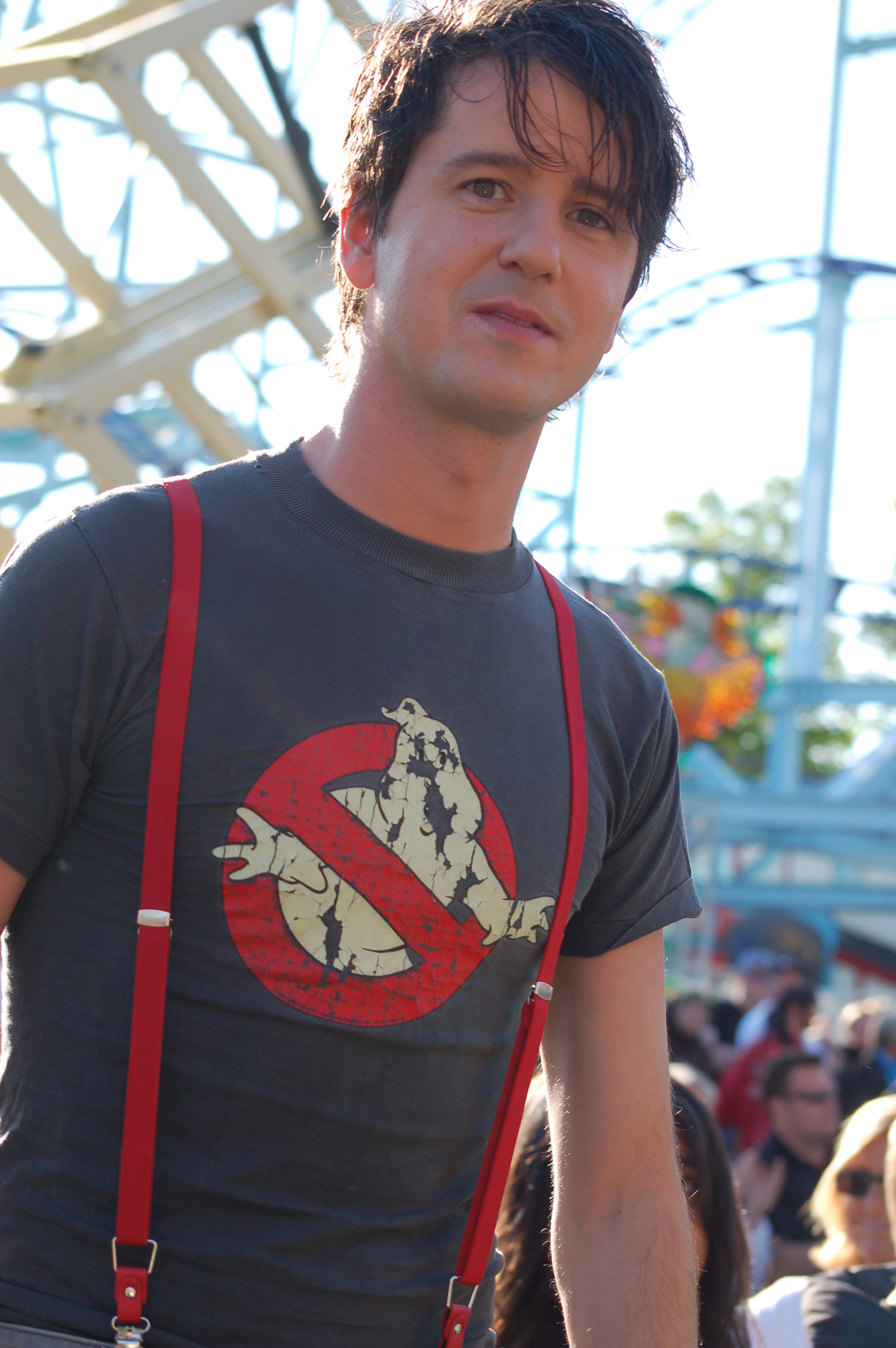
- Born: 27 March 1974 (age 52)
- Website: www.lasselindh.se

Lasse Lindh (born 27 March 1974) is a Swedish indie pop musician. His debut album, Bra, came out on EMI in 1998, and featured three charting singles in Sweden. Lindh began singing in English for his second album, You Wake Up at Sea Tac (the title is a reference to a line in Fight Club), which was released in 2002. Lindh's relationship with South Korea dates back to 2006: his songs "The Stuff" and "C'mon Through" were used in the MBC TV series Soulmate. In 2014, his song "Run to You" was used in the drama by SBS, Angel Eyes and in 2016-2017, his song "Hush" was used in the Korean drama by tvN, Guardian: The Lonely and Great God, which was starring by Gong Yoo, Kim Go-eun and others. His most recent album returns to Swedish. Lindh has contributed vocals to the recordings of labelmates Club 8.

== Discography ==
=== Albums ===
| Title | Album details | Peak chart positions | |
| Title | Album details | KOR | SWE |
|---|---|---|---|
| Bra | Released: 1998; Label: EMI, Parlophone | — | — |
| Bruised (EP) | Released: 2001; Label: Labrador Records | — | — |
| You Wake Up at Sea Tac | Released: 2002; Label: Labrador Records, Hidden Agenda | — | — |
| Lasse Lindh | Released: 2005; Label: Groover Recordings | — | 31 |
| Attica (EP) | Released 2006; Label: Groover Recordings | — | 34 |
| Jag tyckte jag var glad | Released: 2007; Label: Groover Recordings | — | 40 |
| When You Grow Old... Your Heart Dies | Released: 2007; Label: Chili Music Korea | — | — |
| Pool | Released: 2008; Label: Groover Recordings | — | 34 |
| Sparks | Released: 2009; Label: Chili Music Korea | — | — |
| Svenska hjärtan 05-09 | Released: 2009; Label: Groover Recordings | — | — |
| Lasse Lindh 05-10 | Released: 2010; Label: Chili Music Korea | 65 | — |
| The Tiger with No Stripes | Released: 2011; Label: Chili Music Korea | — (Note: The Tiger with No Stripes did not enter the comprehensive Gaon Album Chart, but it peaked at #37 on the component international Gaon Album Chart.) | — |
| Demons in a Locket | Released: 2019; Label: Chili Music Korea | — | — |

=== Singles ===
| Title | Year | Peak chart positions | Album |
| Title | Year | SWE | Album |
|---|---|---|---|
| "I en annan flicka" | 1998 | — | Bra |
| "Jag vill vara som du" | 1998 | — | Bra |
| "Hon är bättre" | 1998 | — | Bra |
| "Walk With Me" | 2001 | — | You Wake Up at Sea Tac |
| "Bruised" | 2001 | — | Bruised |
| "Svenska hjärtan" | 2005 | 23 | Lasse Lindh |
| "Sommarens sista smak" | 2005 | — | Lasse Lindh |
| "Radion spelar aldrig våran sång" | 2006 | — | Lasse Lindh |
| "Du skär" | 2006 | — | Attica |
| "Varje litet steg" | 2007 | — | Jag tyckte jag var glad |
| "Ingen vind kan blåsa omkull oss nu" | 2007 | — | Jag tyckte jag var glad |
| "Du behöver aldrig mer vara rädd" | 2008 | 12 | Pool |
| "Kom kampsång" (with Timo Räisänen) | 2008 | 23 | Pool |
| "Tunn" | 2008 | — | Pool |
| "Jag ska slåss i dina kvarter" | 2009 | 49 | Non-album single |
| "Fix Your Heart" | 2011 | — | Hallå, Seoul (할로, 서울) (single album) |
| "Like You All" (with Yeongene) | 2012 | — | Lasse Lindh & Yeongene (single album) |

=== Soundtrack appearances ===
| Title | Year | Peak chart positions | Sales (DL) | Album |
| Title | Year | KOR | Sales (DL) | Album |
|---|---|---|---|---|
| "C'mon Through" | 2006 | — | | Soulmate OST |
| "The Stuff" | 2006 | — | | Soulmate OST |
| "I Could Give You Love" | 2012 | — | | I Need Romance OST |
| "Run to You" | 2014 | 53 | KOR: 72,169 | Angel Eyes OST |
| "Because I" | 2015 | — | | Bubble Gum OST |
| "Hush" | 2016 | 6 | KOR: 832,294 | Guardian: The Lonely and Great God OST |
| "Be Your Moon" | 2020 | — | | A Piece of Your Mind OST |
