= Sheelah =

Swedish girl group

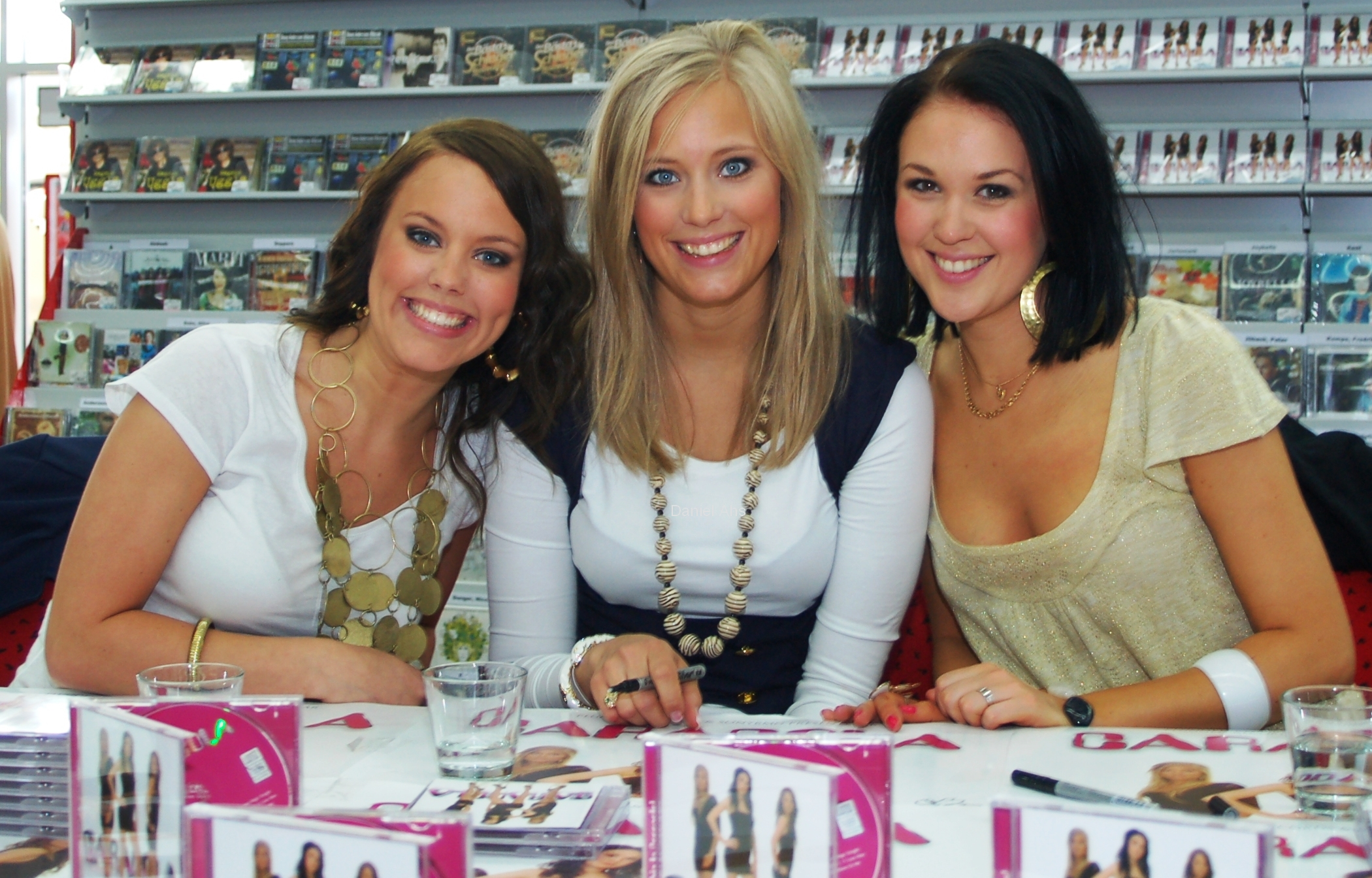
- Sheelah in 2008; from left to right: Frida Karlsson, Emelie Rosén and Emma Lewin

Background information
- Also known as: Caracola (2005–2009)
- Origin: Sweden
- Genres: Pop
- Years active: 2005–2011, 2014–present
- Members: Vendela Hollström; Ebba Knutsson; Sannah Johansson
- Past members: Frida Karlsson; Emma Lewin; Emilie Rosén; Sara Li

Sheelah (formerly known as Caracola) is a Swedish girl group originally launched in 2006 with members Frida Karlsson, Emma Lewin and Emilie Rosén and later Sara Li in 2009 as a replacement for Karlsson when she left Caracola. As of 2014, Caracola was relaunched with members Vendela Hollström, Ebba Knutsson and Sannah Johansson. They sing in harmonies as well as in chorus, and the style of their music varies between schlager pop and Ibiza-style trance, but a dance element is usually present. The name was changed from Caracola to Sheelah in 2009, after a disagreement with their earlier record label, who had the rights to the name Caracola. Li left the group in 2010 to focus on her solo career.

Sheelah disbanded in 2011. In January 2014, Caracola was relaunched with Vendela Hollström, Ebba Knutsson and Sannah Johansson.

Caracola attained a number of Top 10 singles in Sweden, with "Överallt" (2006), "Sommarnatt" (2006), "Glömmer bort mig" (2006), "Mango Nights" (2007) and "Smiling in Love" (2008).

On 23 February 2008, they participated in the third semi-final of Melodifestivalen 2008 with the song "Smiling in Love". After finishing within the top half of their semi-final but not within the top-quarter, they got through to the round called 'Andra Chansen' ('Second Chance') on 8 March, but lost in a head-to-head vote against Ola Svensson's "Love in Stereo". However, "Smiling in Love" went on to become one of their greatest hits in the Swedish singles chart, spending significantly more weeks on the Swedish singles chart than any other hit of theirs to date, outlasting nearly all of the Melodifestivalen entries that reached the final of the competition, and notably spending twice as many weeks in the Swedish Top 25 as Svensson's song, which managed only seven, of which one in the Top 10.

Caracola have released albums in both Swedish and English, but these have been less successful than their singles so far, their first "Caracola" (2006) peaking at No. 34 and spending just two weeks on the Swedish album chart, their second "Love Alive" (2007) peaking at No. 43 in its sole week on the chart, and their third "This is Caracola" (2008) peaking at No. 24 though enjoying a total of nine weeks in the Top 50 albums chart.

At the beginning of 2009, Karlsson left Caracola for unknown reasons and was replaced by Sara Li. Later in 2009, after issues with their record label, they stopped as Caracola and left the label, leaving them unable to use their old Caracola name anymore. They changed their name to Sheelah and began working on their new album with an edgier pop/dance sound. They continued to tour around Sweden as Sheelah, performing a mixture of Caracola songs and covers. Sometime during 2010, Li left Sheelah to focus on her solo career and Sheelah continued as a duo with Lewin and Rosén.

Later in 2010, Sheelah released their new song called "Psycho". In 2011, they returned with a new single called "The Last Time", with a promotional music video being shot and uploaded on YouTube. However, in fall 2011, Lewin decided to leave Sheelah to pursue a solo career. She had not been replaced yet and nothing had been heard from Sheelah since Lewin's departure, leaving fans to believe Sheelah was either on break or disbanded.

As of 2012, Lewin is now a solo artist under her own name. She released her first song online with a music video called "No Excuses", which has a dance/pop sound close to their Sheelah material. She is currently in the recording process of her debut album.

In January 2014, it was revealed that Caracola would be relaunched with three new members, Vendela Hollström, Ebba Knutsson and Sannah Johansson. The group began touring around Sweden, performing Caracola hits like "Smiling In Love", "Mango Nights" and "Sommernatt" and also a mixture of cover songs. Caracola also started recording a new single, due for a release in 2014, however, activities with the new line-up stopped in April 2014 and updates on their official pages stopped as well.

Recently, their Twitter account @caracolaofficial was taken offline. Their Facebook banner also removed the photo of the new line-up and replaced it with a photo of the Caracola logo. In 2015, it has been confirmed with members of the recent line-up that they are no longer in Caracola, however, a member hinted that Caracola itself hasn't ended. It is unknown if the label has any further plans for Caracola, as no official word from the label about their activities have been announced.

== Discography ==
- Caracola (2006)
- Love Alive (2007)
- This Is Caracola (2008)
