= Patrik Isaksson (singer) =

Swedish singer and songwriter

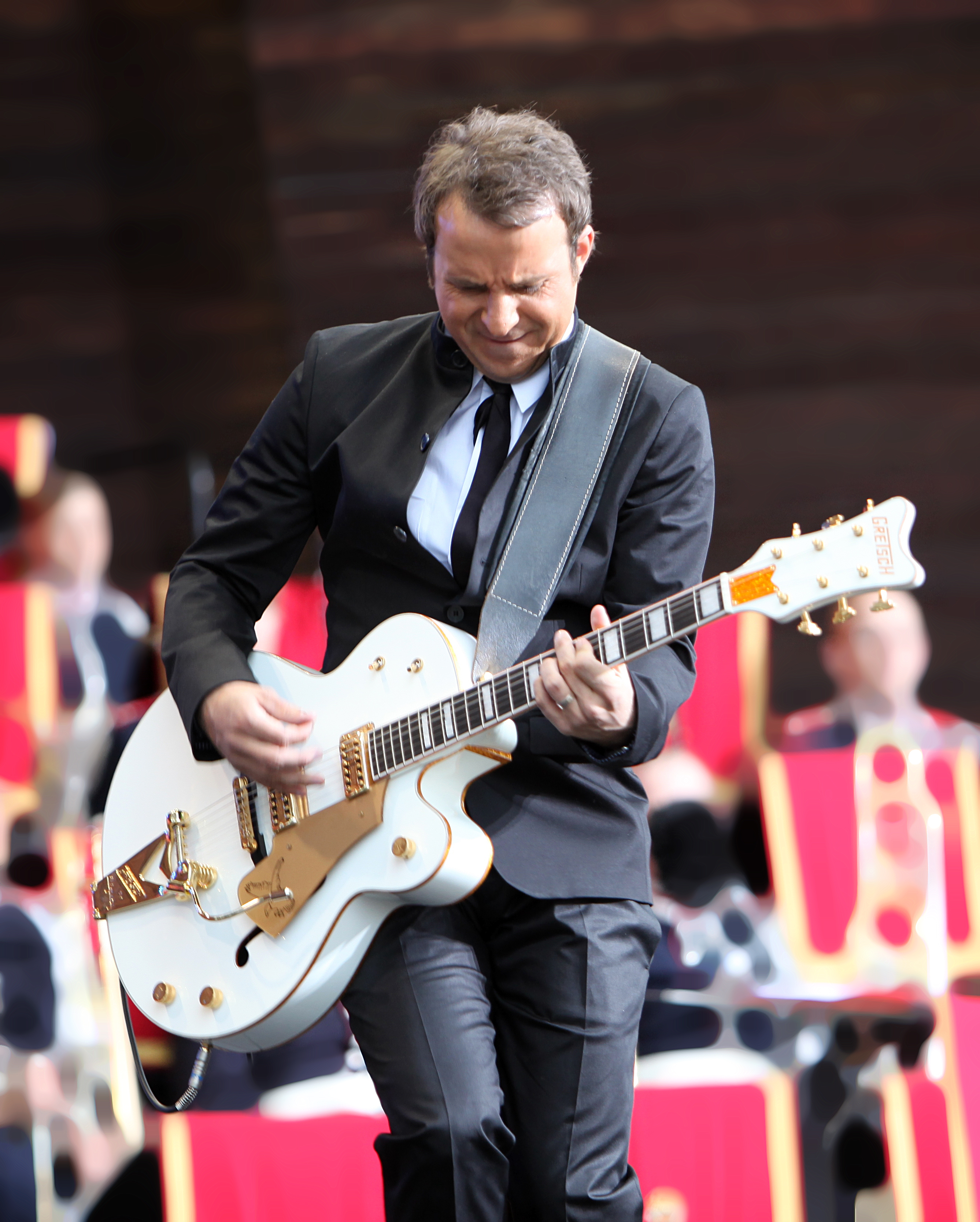
- Isaksson performing in June 2009
- Born: Patrik Christian Isaksson; 3 August 1972 (age 54); Stockholm, Sweden
- Occupations: Singer; songwriter
- Years active: 1999–present
- Musical career
- Genre: Pop
- Instruments: Vocals; guitar
- Label: Sony
- Website: patrikisaksson.se

Patrik Christian Isaksson (born 3 August 1972) is a Swedish singer and songwriter. He became known for his music single ”Du får göra som du vill” which was released in 1999. He competed in Swedish Melodifestivalen 2006 with the song "Faller du så faller jag" and again in 2008, with the song "Under mitt tunna skinn". In 2012, he competed in the Danish Dansk Melodi Grand Prix 2012 with the song "Venter", a duet with Christian Brøns. As of August 2024, Isaksson has released seven studio albums.

== Discography ==
=== Albums ===
Year	Album	Chart positions	
Year	Album	SWE	DEN
1999	När verkligheten tränger sig på	3	-
2001	Tillbaks på ruta 1	1	8
2004	Vi som aldrig landat	9	-
2006	Patrik Isaksson	6	-
2008	10 år – En snäll mans bekännelser	3	-
2011	No. 6	28	-
2023	Mellan hopp och förtvivlan	-	-

=== Singles ===
Year	Song	Chart positions					Album
Year	Song	SWE Singles Chart	SWE Svensk- toppen	SWE Tracks	DEN Singles Chart	DEN P3 Tjeklisten	Album
1999	"Du får göra som du vill"	11	15	4	-	-	När verkligheten tränger sig på
1999	"Hos dig är jag underbar"	9	14	5	-	-	När verkligheten tränger sig på
2000	"Kom genom eld"	-	11	13	-	-	När verkligheten tränger sig på
2000	"Kan du se mig"	-	14	-	-	-	När verkligheten tränger sig på
2000	"Det måste vara radion" (with Sahara Hotnights, LOK & Therese Grankvist)	51	-	5	-	-	Single only
2000	"Det som var nu" (with Marie Fredriksson)	59	13	20	-	-	Äntligen – Marie Fredrikssons bästa 1984–2000 (Marie Fredriksson)
2001	"Ruta 1"	14	15	9	-	-	Tillbaks på ruta 1
2001	"Tilbage til hvor vi var" (Christian Brøns and Patrik Isaksson)	-	-	-	1	1	Tillbaks på ruta 1
2002	"Aldrig mer"	-	11	22	-	7	Tillbaks på ruta 1
2002	"Låt det komma ut" (with Anders Glenmark)	-	15	-	-	-	Alla dessa bilder (Anders Glenmark)
2002	"Hur kan du lova mig"	-	15	-	-	14	Tillbaks på ruta 1
2004	"1985"	-	7	-	-	-	Vi som aldrig landat
2004	"Innan dagen gryr"	30	12	-	-	-	Vi som aldrig landat
2004	"Vi som aldrig landat"	-	14	-	-	-	Vi som aldrig landat
2006	"Faller du så faller jag"	12	6	10	-	-	Patrik Isaksson
2006	"Innan klockan slår" (with Dea)	8	10	-	-	-	Patrik Isaksson
2006	"Vår sista dag"	-	9	-	-	-	Patrik Isaksson
2007	"Du som tog mitt hjärta" (with Sarah Dawn Finer)	45	10	-	-	-	10 år – En snäll mans bekännelser
2008	"Under mitt tunna skinn" (as Patrik Isaksson & Bandet)	10	5	12	-	-	10 år – En snäll mans bekännelser
2008	"Elddon"	-	14	-	-	-	10 år – En snäll mans bekännelser
2008	"Hjärtat vet mer än vi" (with Helen Sjöholm)	-	5	-	-	-	10 år – En snäll mans bekännelser
2010	"Mitt Stockholm"	-	12	-	-	-	No. 6
2011	"Du var den som jag saknat"	-	-	-	-	-	No. 6
2011	"Säg mig"	-	11	-	-	-	No. 6
2012	"Venter" (Christian Brøns & Patrik Isaksson)	-	-	-	9	-	Single only
2016	"Håll mitt hjärta hårt" (with Tommy Nilsson & Uno Svenningsson as Patrik, Tommy & Uno)	103	-	-	-	-	Melodifestivalen 2016
