= Andra Generationen =

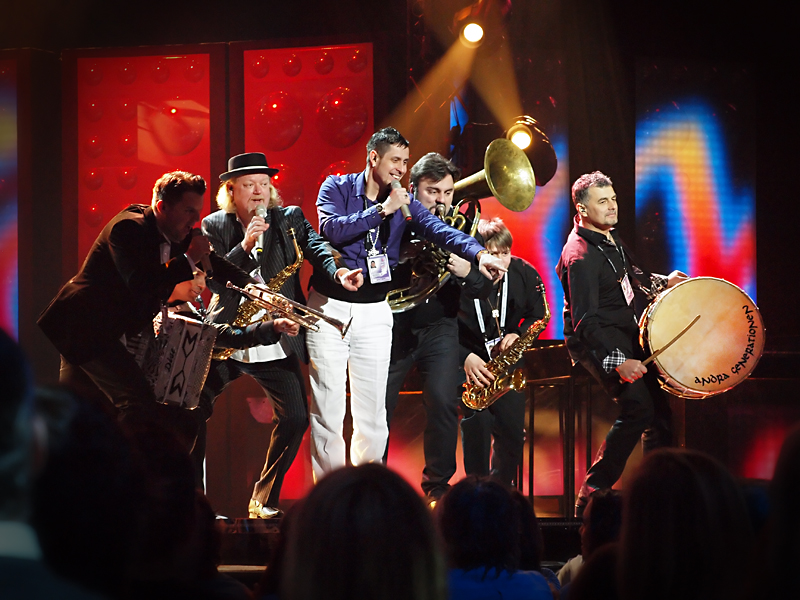
- Andra Generationen and Dogge Doggelito performing in Melodifestivalen 2010

Background information
- Origin: Sweden
- Genres: Balkan
- Years active: 1988–
- Label: Warner Swede

Andra Generationen is a Swedish band with Balkan music roots. It was formed in 1988. The group's debut album, Kärlekens land, charted at #31 on the Swedish Albums Chart on 27 February 2004. Four years later they appeared in Melodifestivalen with the song "Kebabpizza Slivovitza", which became their first big hit and charted at #2 on the Swedish Singles Chart. The album containing the song, Extra allt, charted at #32 on the albums chart. In 2010 they participated in Melodifestivalen again, this time together with Dogge Doggelito. The song, "Hippare hoppare", charted at #45.
