= I decembertid =

Studio album by Malena Ernman
- Released: 13 November 2013
- Recorded: September 2013
- Genre: Christmas, operapop
- Length: 48 minutes
- Label: King Island Roxystars Recordings
- Producer: Anders Hansson

Malena Ernman chronology
Opera di Fiori (2011)	I decembertid (2013)	SDS (2014)

I decembertid is a 2013 Malena Ernman Christmas album.

== Track listing ==
1. "Counting Miracles" (duet with Jerry Williams)
2. "Så mörk är natten"
3. "Till Betlehem mitt hjärta"
4. "God Rest Ye Merry Gentlemen"
5. "Stilla natt" (Stille Nacht, heilige Nacht)
6. "Härlig är jorden"
7. "I decembertid"
8. "Marias vaggsång" (Mariae Wiegenlied)
9. "Jul, jul, strålande jul"
10. "I väntat på julen" ("Greensleeves")
11. "Håll mitt hjärta"
12. "You'll Never Walk Alone"
13. "O helga natt" (Cantique de Noël)

== Contributors ==
- Malena Ernman - singer
- Anders Hansson - bass, drums, percussion, producer
- Mats Bergström - guitar
- Hans Backenroth - bass
- Jesper Nordenström - piano
- Beata Ernman, Greta Thunberg, "Emma", "Maja" - choir

== Charts ==
=== Weekly charts ===
Chart (2013–2014)	Peak position
Swedish Albums (Sverigetopplistan)	4

=== Year-end charts ===
Chart (2013)	Position
Swedish Albums (Sverigetopplistan)	39
