= Santa Lucia – En klassisk jul =

Studio album by Malena Ernman
- Released: 17 November 2010
- Genre: Christmas, operapop
- Length: 55 minutes
- Label: King Island Roxystars Recordings

Malena Ernman chronology
La Voix du Nord (2009)	Santa Lucia – En klassisk jul (2010)	Opera di Fiori (2011)

Santa Lucia – En klassisk jul is a Christmas album by Malena Ernman, released on 17 November 2010.

== Track listing ==
1. Jul, jul, strålande jul
2. När det lider mot jul
3. Halleluja
4. Pie Jesu (Fauré)
5. Santa Lucia (with Charles Castronovo)
6. Laudamus Te
7. Stilla natt (Stille Nacht, heilige Nacht)
8. Laudate Dominum
9. Koppången
10. Eternal Source of Light Divine
11. Bred dina vida vingar
12. Pie Jesu (Webber)
13. Betlehems stjärna
14. Ave Maria (with Martin Fröst)
15. Marias vaggsång (Mariae Wiegenlied)
16. Den signade dag

== Charts ==
=== Weekly charts ===
Chart (2010–2011)	Peak position
Swedish Albums (Sverigetopplistan)	2

=== Year-end charts ===
Chart (2010)	Position
Swedish Albums (Sverigetopplistan)	12
