= 2010 in Swedish music =

The following is a summary of notable events and releases of the year 2010 in Swedish music.

== Events ==
=== June ===
- 9 – The 19th Sweden Rock Festival started in Norje (June 9–12).

=== December ===
- 11 – Elisas wins the 2010 edition of Dansbandskampen.

== Summary ==
Sweden is one of the largest exporters of pop and rock music in the world. Many Swedish artists have enjoyed success on the British and American charts and in other English speaking countries.

Other famous musicians of today are:

Pop Robyn, Agnes, Darin, September, Alcazar, Danny Saucedo, Velvet

Rock Mando Diao, Takida, Johnossi, The Hives, Kent

Rap Lazee, Adam Tensta

Dance Swedish House Mafia, Eric Prydz, Basshunter

New Artists Anna Bergendahl, Eric Saade, PLAY (Reunion)

== Number ones ==
=== Number-one singles ===
Issue date	Song	Artist
8 January	"Higher"	Erik Grönwall
15 January	"Higher"	Erik Grönwall
22 January	"Bad Romance"	Lady Gaga
29 January	"Higher"	Erik Grönwall
5 February	"Bad Romance"	Lady Gaga
12 February	"Fireflies"	Owl City
19 February	"Ambitions"	Donkeyboy
26 February	"Famous"	PLAY
5 March	"This is my life"	Anna Bergendahl
12 March	"This is my Life"	Anna Bergendahl
19 March	"This is my Life"	Anna Bergendahl
26 March	"This is my Life"	Anna Bergendahl
2 April	"Unstoppable"	Ola
9 April	"Manboy"	"Eric Saade
16 April	"Stereo Love"	Edward Maya
23 April	"Stereo Love"	Edward Maya
30 April	"Manboy"	"Eric Saade
7 May	"Hurricane"	Rebound!
14 May	"Stereo Love"	Edward Maya
21 May	"Stereo Love"	Edward Maya
28 May	"Manboy"	"Eric Saade
4 June	"Satellite"	Lena
11 June	"Satellite"	Lena
18 June	"Satellite"	Lena
25 June	"Gamla Ullevi"	Kent
2 July	"When You Tell the World You're Mine"	Agnes & Björn Skifs
9 July	"We No Speak Americano"	Yolanda Be Cool
16 July	"We No Speak Americano"	Yolanda Be Cool
23 July	"Overdrive"	Ola Svensson

=== Number-one albums ===
Issue date	Album	Artist
8 January	Erik Grönwall	Erik Grönwall
15 January	Erik Grönwall	Erik Grönwall
22 January	Strike!	The Baseballs
29 January	Strike!	The Baseballs
5 February	Strike!	The Baseballs
12 February	Rock'N Roll Dance Party	The Playtones
19 February	Soldier of Love	Sade
26 February	Rock'N Roll Dance Party	The Playtones
5 March	Rock'N Roll Dance Party	The Playtones
12 March	Rock'N Roll Dance Party	The Playtones
19 March	Ignore This	Salem Al Fakir
26 March	Ignore This	Salem Al Fakir
2 April	Jajamen	Rolandz
9 April	Jajamen	Rolandz
16 April	Slash	Slash
23 April	Yours Sincerely	Anna Bergendahl
30 April	Iron Man 2	AC/DC
7 May	Längtan	Timoteij
14 May	Iron Man 2	AC/DC
21 May	Iron Man 2	AC/DC
28 May	Exile on Main St.	The Rolling Stones
4 June	Texas	Lasse Stefanz
11 June	Texas	Lasse Stefanz
18 June	Texas	Lasse Stefanz
25 June	Body Talk Pt. 1	Robyn
2 July	En plats i solen	Kent
9 July	En plats i solen	Kent
16 July	En plats i solen	Kent
23 July	En plats i solen	Kent

=== Number-one downloads ===
Issue date	Song	Artist
10 January	"Higher"	Erik Grönwall
17 January	"Higher"	Erik Grönwall
24 January	"Bad Romance"	Lady Gaga
31 January	"Bad Romance"	Lady Gaga
7 February	"Bad Romance"	Lady Gaga
14 February	"Fireflies"	Owl City
21 February	"Ambitions"	Donkeyboy
28 February	"Bad Romance"	Lady Gaga
7 March	"This is my life"	Anna Bergendahl
14 March	"This is my Life"	Anna Bergendahl
21 March	"This is my Life"	Anna Bergendahl
28 March	"Keep On Walking"	Salem Al Fakir
4 April	"Keep On Walking"	Salem Al Fakir
11 April	"This is my Life"	Anna Bergendahl
18 April	"Stereo Love"	Edward Maya
25 April	"Stereo Love"	Edward Maya
2 May	"Stereo Love"	Edward Maya
9 May	"Hurricane"	Rebound!
16 May	"Stereo Love"	Edward Maya
23 May	"Stereo Love"	Edward Maya
30 May	"Stereo Love"	Edward Maya
6 June	"Satellite"	Lena
13 June	"Satellite"	Lena
20 June	"Satellite"	Lena
27 June	Gamla Ullevi	Kent
4 July	"When You Tell the World You're Mine"	Agnes & Björn
11 July	"We No Speak Americano"	Yolanda Be Cool
18 July	"We No Speak Americano"	Yolanda Be Cool
25 July	"Overdrive"	Ola Svensson

== Svensktoppen ==
Issue date	Song	Artist
3 January	"Happyland"	Amanda Jenssen
10 January	"Happyland"	Amanda Jenssen
17 January	"Happyland"	Amanda Jenssen
24 January	"Happyland"	Amanda Jenssen
31 January	"Happyland"	Amanda Jenssen
7 February	"Happyland"	Amanda Jenssen
14 February	"Happyland"	Amanda Jenssen
21 February	"Happyland"	Amanda Jenssen
28 February	"Underbart"	Orsa Spelmän
7 March	"Underbart"	Orsa Spelmän
14 March	"Underbart"	Orsa Spelmän
21 March	"Underbart"	Orsa Spelmän
28 March	"Underbart"	Orsa Spelmän
4 April	"Underbart"	Orsa Spelmän
11 April	"Underbart"	Orsa Spelmän
18 April	"Underbart"	Orsa Spelmän
25 April	"Underbart"	Orsa Spelmän
2 May	"Underbart"	Orsa Spelmän
9 May	"Underbart"	Orsa Spelmän
16 May	"I Did It For Love"	Jessica Andersson
23 May	"I Did It For Love"	Jessica Andersson
30 May	"I Did It For Love"	Jessica Andersson
6 June	"I Did It For Love"	Jessica Andersson
13 June	"I Did It For Love"	Jessica Andersson
20 June	"I Did It For Love"	Jessica Andersson
27 June	"I Did It For Love"	Jessica Andersson
4 July	"I Did It For Love"	Jessica Andersson
11 July	"When You Tell the World You're Mine"	Agnes & Björn
18 July	"When You Tell the World You're Mine"	Agnes & Björn
25 July	"When You Tell the World You're Mine"	Agnes & Björn

== Album releases ==
=== January ===
  - 12/1 – Skånska Mord – The Last Supper
  - 22/1 – Asteroid – II

=== February ===
  - 8/2 – Thunder Express – Republic Disgrace
  - 24/2 – Dark Tranquillity – We Are the Void

=== March ===
  - 10/3 – Soreption – Deterioration Of Minds
  - 12/3 – Abramis Brama – Rubicon
  - 15/3 – Katatonia – The Longest Year
  - 24/3 – Linda Sundblad – Manifest
  - 26/3 – At The Gates – Purgatory Unleashed – Live at Wacken
  - 31/3 – Doomdogs – Doomdogs

=== April ===
  - 7/4 – Engel – Threnody
  - 12/4 – Agnes – Dance Love Pop (Australian/New Zealand Edit)
  - 14/4 – Crashdïet – Generation Wild
  - 21/4 – Dundertåget – Dom feta åren är förbi
  - 21/4 – Anna Bergendahl – Yours Sincerely
  - 21/4 – Zombiekrig – Undantagstillstånd
  - 21/4 – The Haunted- Road Kill
  - 23/4 – SnakeStorm- Choose Your Finger
  - 28/4 – Timoteij – Längtan

=== May ===
  - 5/5 – Hate Ammo – Bound by Hate
  - 7/5 – Chris Laney – Only Come Out At Night
  - 12/5 – Pain Of Salvation – Road Salt One
  - 19/5 – Eric Saade – Masquerade
  - 19/5 – April Divine – Redemption
  - 21/5 – Sabaton – Coat of Arms
  - 24/5 – Agnes – Dance Love Pop (UK Edit)
  - 28/5 – Imperial State Electric – Imperial State Electric
  - 28/5 – Sideburn – The Demon Dance

=== June ===
  - 7/6 – Watain – Lawless Darkness
  - 9/6 – Oskar Linnros – Vilja Bli
  - 14/6 – Robyn – Body Talk Pt. 1
  - 23/6 – Grand Magus – Hammer Of The North
  - 24/6 – Kent – En plats i solen

=== July ===
  - 5/7 – 8-Point Rose – Primigenia
  - 2 – Soilwork – The Panic Broadcast
  - 19 – Layers of Live – Darkane
  - 20 – Soilwork – The Sledgehammer Files: The Best of Soilwork 1998-2008

=== August ===
  - 18/8 – Darin – Lovekiller
  - 18/8 – Pray For Locust – Swarm

=== September ===
  - 1/9 – Sonic Syndicate – We Rule The Night
  - 6/9 – Robyn – Body Talk Pt. 2
  - 14/9 – Dungen – Skit I Allt (Mexican Summer).
  - 20/9 – Opeth – In Live Concert at the Royal Albert Hall
  - 22/9 – Raubtier – Skriet från vildmarken
  - 22/9 – Therion – Sitra Ahra
  - 28/9 – October Tide – A Thin Shell
  - 29/9 – The Crown – Doomsday King

=== October ===
  - 6/10 – Corroded – Exit To Transfer
  - 15/10 – Despite – Clenched
  - 27/10 – Nicke Borg Homeland – Chapter 1
  - 29/10 – Ghost – Opus Eponymous
  - 29/10 – Stonewall Noise Orchestra – Sweet Mississippi Deal

=== November ===
  - 12/11 – Chuck Norris Experiment – Dead Central
  - 26/11 – Hardcore Superstar – Split Your Lip

== See also ==
- 2010 in Sweden
