= No One Is Too Small to Make a Difference =

2019 book by Greta Thunberg

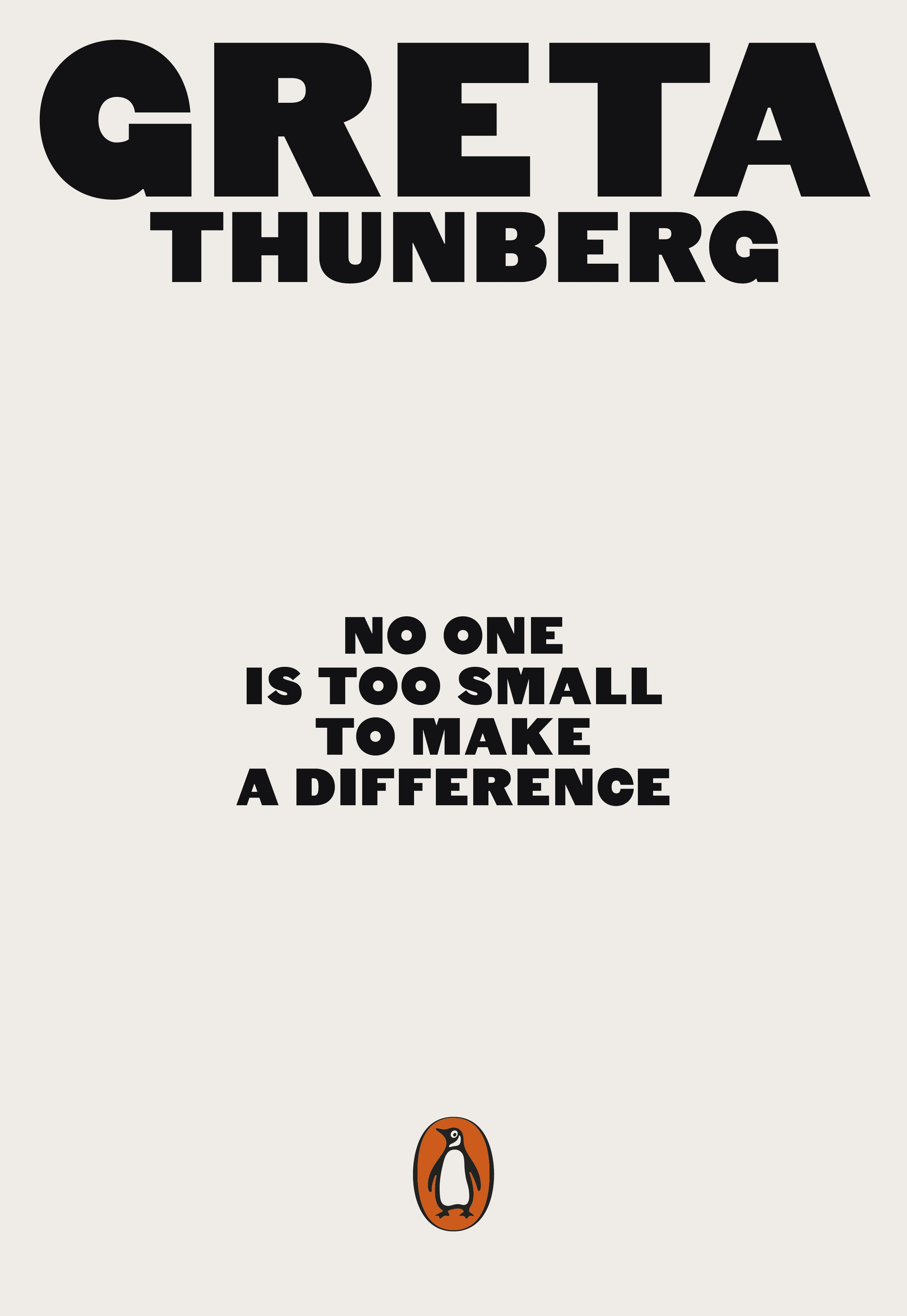
- Cover of the book
- Author: Greta Thunberg
- Language: English
- Publisher: Penguin
- Publication date: 30 May 2019 (1st edition); November 2019 (2nd edition)
- Publication place: Sweden
- Pages: 68
- ISBN: 978-0-14-199174-0

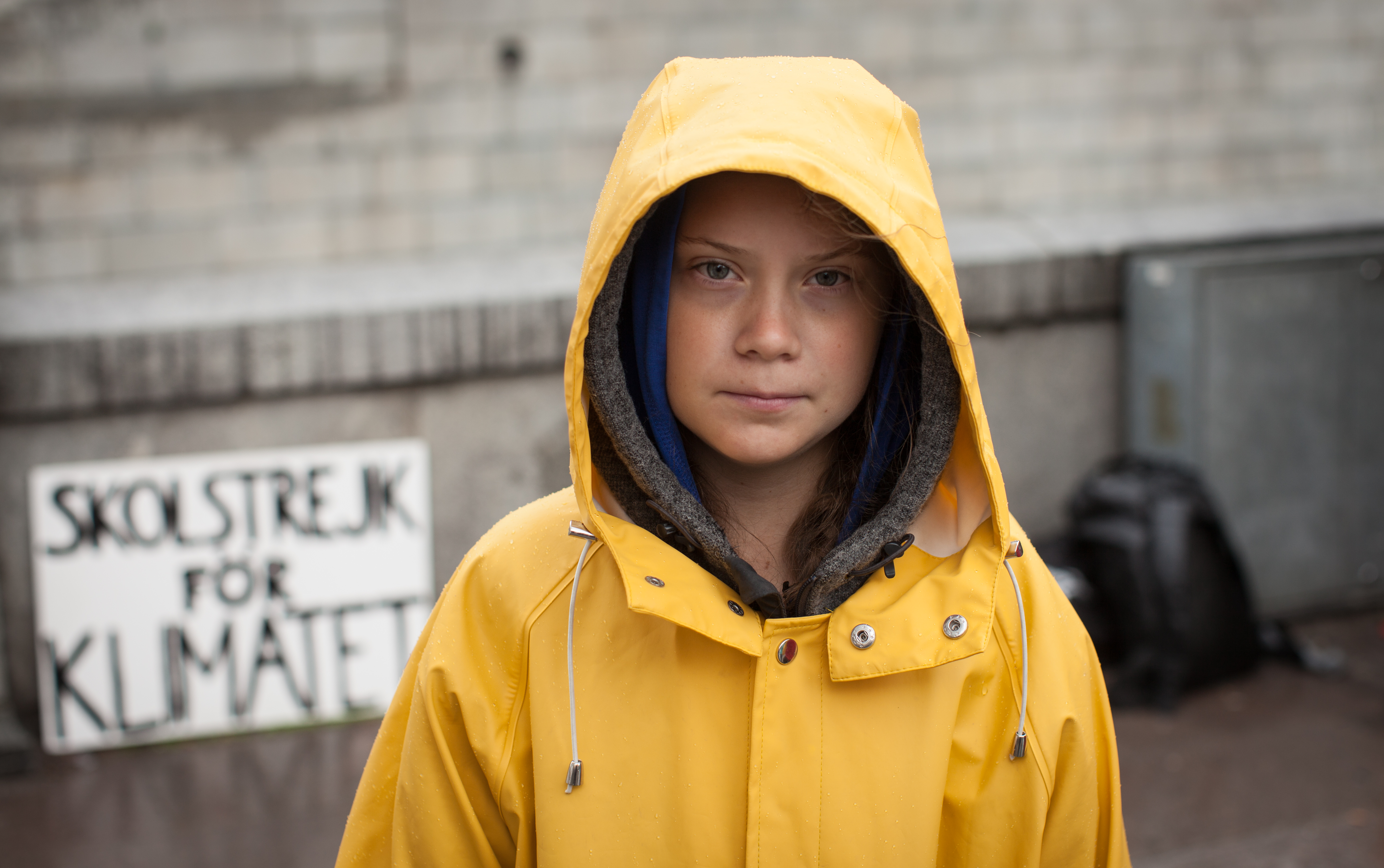
Greta Thunberg striking in Stockholm (2018). A detail of this photo illustrates the back cover of the book's first edition.

No One Is Too Small to Make a Difference is a book by climate activist Greta Thunberg. Originally published on 30 May 2019, the book consists of a collection of eleven speeches which she has written and presented about global warming and the climate crisis.

== History ==
Greta Thunberg has presented the speeches in front of the United Nations, the European Union, the World Economic Forum and during demonstrations and protests. One of her most famous speeches which appears in the book is "Our House Is on Fire".

The first edition was published on 30 May 2019. An expanded edition was published on 21 November 2019 with five new speeches.

In November 2019, Thunberg was named author of the year by Waterstones for No One Is Too Small to Make a Difference.

== Speeches ==
1. Our Lives Are in Your Hands
  (Climate March, Stockholm, 8 September 2018)
2. Almost Everything Is Black and White
  (Declaration of Rebellion, Extinction Rebellion, Parliament Square, London, 31 October 2018)
3. Unpopular
  (United Nations Climate Change Conference, Katowice, Poland, 15 December 2018)
4. Prove Me Wrong
  (World Economic Forum, Davos, 22 January 2019)
5. Our House Is on Fire
  (World Economic Forum, Davos, 25 January 2019)
6. I'm Too Young to Do This
  (Facebook, Stockholm, 2 February 2019)
7. You're Acting Like Spoiled, Irresponsible Children
  (European Economic and Social Committee, Brussels, 21 February 2019)
8. A Strange World
  (Goldene Kamera Film and TV Awards, Berlin, 30 March 2019)
9. Cathedral Thinking
  (European Parliament, Strasbourg, 16 April 2019)
10. Together We Are Making a Difference
  (Extinction Rebellion rally, Marble Arch, London, 23 April 2019)
11. Can You Hear Me?
  (Houses of Parliament, London, 23 April 2019)

=== Added in the November 2019 edition ===
12. The Easiest Solution Is Right in Front of You
  (Austrian World Summit, Vienna, 28 May 2019)
13. You Can't Simply Make Up Your Own Facts
  (French National Assembly, Paris, 23 July 2019)
14. Wherever I Go, I Seem to Be Surrounded by Fairy Tales
  (United States Congress, Washington D.C., 18 September 2019)
15. The World Is Waking Up
  (United Nations General Assembly, New York City, 23 September 2019)
16. We Are the Change and Change Is Coming
  (Week for Future, climate strike, Montreal, 27 September 2019)

== Translations ==
- Dutch: Niemand is te klein om het verschil te maken. Translated by Nico Groen. Amsterdam: De Bezige Bij. 2019. ISBN 9789403183800.
- French: Rejoignez-nous: #grevepourclimat, lit. 'Join Us: #climatestrike'. Translated by Flore Vasseur. Paris: Kero. 2019. ISBN 9782366584059.
- Greek: Η ζωή μας είναι στα χέρια σας, romanized: I zoí mas eínai sta chéria sas, lit. 'Our Life is in Your Hands'. Translated by Argyró Pipíni. Athens: Papadopoulos. 2019. ISBN 9789604845095.
- Norwegian: Streik for klimaet, lit. 'Strike for the Climate'. Translated by Lene Stokseth. Oslo: Cappelen Damm. 2019. ISBN 9788202644840.
- Persian: هیچ‌کس آن‌قدر کوچک نیست که نتواند تغییری ایجاد کند. Translated by Elnaz Farhanakian. Tehran: Noon. 2020. ISBN 9786008740414.
- Spanish: Cambiemos el mundo, lit. 'Change the World'. Translated by Aurora Echevarría Pérez. Barcelona: Lumen. 2020. ISBN 9788426407306.

== See also ==
- Scenes from the Heart – a book about Thunberg's family by her mother Malena Ernman (together with Svante Thunberg and their daughters).
