= Something to Believe In (Anna Bergendahl album) =

Studio album by Anna Bergendahl
- Released: October 24, 2012
- Recorded: 2012
- Genre: Pop, folk
- Label: Lionheart International; Universal Music Group

Anna Bergendahl chronology
Anna Bergendahl (2012)	Something to Believe In (2012)	Live from Sandkvie Studio (2015)

Something to Believe In is the second studio album by the Swedish singer Anna Bergendahl released on 24 October 2012 on Lionheart International as a follow-up to her first Yours Sincerely (2010).

== Background and Development ==
After gaining national recognition by winning Sweden's Melodifestivalen in 2010 with the song "This Is My Life," Bergendahl represented Sweden at the Eurovision Song Contest that same year. Despite not qualifying for the final, she continued to build her music career. Something to Believe In showcases her growth as an artist, blending pop and folk influences to create a distinct sound.

== Chart performance ==
Upon its release, the album entered the Swedish Album Chart, peaking at position 13, reflecting a positive reception from the Swedish audience.

== Availability ==
Something to Believe In is available on various music platforms, including:

Spotify

Apple Music

Amazon

== Track list ==
No.	Title	Length
1.	"I Don't Know (Where We're Going With This)"
2.	"Live and Let Go"
3.	"I Hate New York"
4.	"Something to Believe In"
5.	"The Good Thing"
6.	"Fun"
7.	"Love, Me"
8.	"A Good Time"
9.	"Better Than This"
10.	"The Sensible Choice"
11.	"The Last Time"
12.	"Wrong"

== Charts ==
Chart (2012–2013)	Peak position
Swedish Album Chart	13

== Release history ==
Country	Date	Format	Label
Sweden	24 October 2012		Lionheart International
