= Fabian Müller (composer) =

Swiss composer (born 1964)

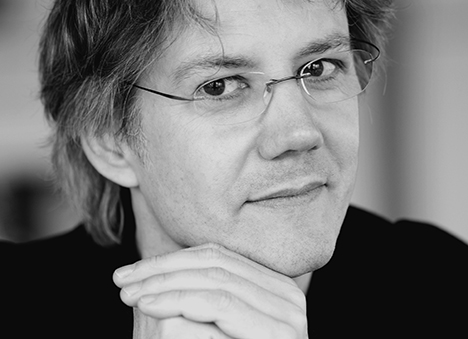
Fabian Müller

Fabian Müller (*12 February 1964 in Zurich) is a Swiss composer.

== Biography ==
Fabian Müller is one of the leading Swiss composers of his generation. He originally comes from Lengau in the canton of Aargau and grew up in Zurich as the son of Peter and Hella Müller-Heuer (daughter of Walter Heuer), a central figure in the area of German orthography. He first studied the cello with Claude Starck at the Zurich Conservatory, but then increasingly dedicated his energies to composition. He studied composition with Josef Haselbach at the Zurich Conservatory. After completing his studies, he spent four summers at the courses of the Aspen Music Festival (Colorado). While there, he studied with Jacob Druckman, Bernard Rands and George Tsontakis.

He received decisive encouragement from David Zinman, who made a recording with the Philharmonia Orchestra, London, including "Nachtgesänge" with Swedish mezzo-soprano Malena Ernman, the Cello Concerto (1999), played by Müller's wife, the Taiwanese cellist Pi-Chin Chien and two further orchestral works. Müller's works are played internationally by well-known orchestras and ensembles and have been heard in halls such as the Carnegie Hall in New York, the Berlin Philharmonic, the Tonhalle Zurich, the Lucerne Culture and Congress Centre, the Philharmonie St. Petersburg and the Teatro Colón. He wrote commissioned works for the Lucerne Festival, the Interlaken Music Festival and the Vestfold Festspillene in Norway. His works have been performed at the Festival de musique de La Chaise-Dieu in France, at the Aspen Music Festival in Colorado and at the Festival Internacional de Ushuaia in Argentina.

Fabian Müller was artistic director of the International Music Festival Lenzburgiade in Switzerland from 2009 to 2013 and he is very interested in ethnomusicology. He spent ten years (1991 to 2002) preparing the publication of the Hanny Christen Collection, a ten-volume anthology of folk music with over 10‘000 tunes from the 19th Century, which initiated a new era for the traditional music of his country.

In 2026, he signed a recording contract with Deutsche Grammophon.

== Recent works ==
Müller's recent works include the opera «Eiger», based on a libretto by the Swiss author Tim Krohn, commissioned by the TOBS Theater Orchestra Biel Solothurn, and a concerto for heckelphone and orchestra for the Swiss oboist Martin Frutiger. Other recently written works include «Canto» for the Zurich Chamber Orchestra ZKO, as well as a Concerto for vibraphone and orchestra and «Clatterclank» for snare drum and string orchestra for Evelyn Glennie. Recent works also include the Cello Sonata No. 2 and «Dialogues Cellestes», a double concerto for two cellos and orchestra commissioned by the cellist Antonio Meneses, and the Concerto per Klee, a homage to Paul Klee, for solo cello and Chamber Orchestra for Steven Isserlis. His «Concerto for Orchestra» was presented on a tour throughout Switzerland (season 08/09) with the «Austrian-Hungarian Haydn-Philharmonic Orchestra» conducted by Christopher Hogwood and his work «Taranis» for large orchestra, was premiered by the Bern Symphony Orchestra in the season 08/09 and was on tour in Germany conducted by Andrey Boreyko in spring 2009.

== Awards ==
- 1996 Jacob Druckman Prize
- 2006 Award of the Canton of Zurich
- 2012: Art Award of Zollikon
- 2016: Nomination for the «Swiss Music Prize» by the Federal Office of Culture
- 2021: Rimbaud for Film music (Festival «Les Rimbaud du Cinema», Paris)
- 2021: Award for the best Film music (SMR13, 6ème Festival International du Film Indépendant)

== Work list ==
=== Orchestral works ===
- «Mother Earth» (大地之母) for large orchestra (2022) commissioned by the One Song Orchestra (灣聲樂團); conducted by Che-yi Lee
- «La Folia-Variations» for large orchestra (2016) Premiere: 3. June 2017; Taiwan, Tainan Shinyin Culture Centre; Symphony-Orchestra of the Tainan National University of Arts; Kai-Hsi Fan
- «abendsfrüh» Intermezzo for Orchestra (2010) Premiere: 12. January 2011; Bern, Kultur-Casino; Neues Zürcher Orchester; Martin Studer-Müller
- Concerto for Orchestra (2007/2008) Premiere: 26. April 2009; Bern, Kultur-Casino; Österreichisch-Ungarische Haydn-Philharmonie, Conducted by: Christopher Hogwood; Commission of the "Klubhaus-Konzerte" 2009
- Taranis (2006) for large Symphony-Orchestra Premiere: 19. November 2008; La Chaux-de-Fond, Salle de Musique; Bern Symphony Orchestra, Conducted by: Dmitry Liss
- Eiger (2004) Premiere: 27. August 2004; Interlakner Musikfestwochen; Latvian National-Symphony Orchestra, Conducted by: Andris Nelsons
- Balada y Bulerias (2003) Premiere: 2. May 2005; Philharmony St. Petersburg; Akademic Symphony Orchestra St. Petersburg, Conducted by: Marc Andreae
- Gayatri-Rhapsody (1997) Premiere: 3. December 2004; Tonhalle Zurich; Tonhalle-Orchester Zurich, Conducted by: Peter Oundjian
- Intrada (1997) Premiere: 1. May 2006; Festival Ushuaia, Argentina; Dvorak Symphony Orchestra (Prague), Conducted by: Claude Villaret

=== Works for Solo and Orchestra ===
- Concerto for heckelphone and orchestra (2020), dedicated to Martin Frutiger
- Concerto for pan flute and orchestra (2017) Premiere: Konzil Konstanz; Urban Frey, pan flute, Südwestdeutsche Philharmonie Konstanz, conducted by: Ari Rasilainen
- Concertino for piano 4 hands, violoncello and String orchestra UA: Duo Vilma & Daniel Zbinden, Pi-Chin Chien, VDO Kammerorchester, Leitung Jonas Janulevicus
- Concerto for Vibraphone and Orchestra (2014) Premiere 7. October 2014 at Tonhalle Zurich; Dame Evelyn Glennie, Weinberger Chamber Orchestra, Conducted by: Gábor Takács-Nagy
- Clatterclank for Snare Drum and String Orchestra (2014) (Homage to Jean Tinguely); Premiere 7. October 2014 at Tonhalle Zurich; Dame Evelyn Glennie, Weinberger Chamber Orchestra, Conducted by: Gábor Takács-Nagy
- «Sirimadi» for Violoncello and Orchestra (2011) Premiere: 1. June 2012; Bangkok, Music Auditorium (MACM Hall); Pi-Chin Chien, Violoncello, Thailand Philharmonic Orchestra, Conducted by: Claude Villaret; Program-music Inspired by a Buddhist tale from Thailand. Commissioned for the anniversary «80 years of diplomatic relations between Switzerland and Thailand» in collaboration with the Swiss Embassy and the Thailand Philharmonic Orchestra.
- «Dialogues Cellestes», Double Concerto for 2 Violoncelli and Chamber Orchestra (2009) Premiere: 18. Februar 2011; Bangkok, Music Auditorium (MACM Hall); Soloists: Antonio Meneses & Pi-Chin Chien, Violoncello, Thailand Philharmonic Orchestra, Conducted by: Claude Villaret
- «Concerto per Klee» for Violoncello and Chamber Orchestra (2007) Premiere: 23. August 2007; Paul Klee Museum, Bern; Steven Isserlis, Violoncello, Weinberger Chamber Orchestra, Conducted by: Gábor Takács-Nagy
- «Lied des Einsamen» for Alto-Saxophone and String Orchestra (2005); Homage to Dag Hammarskjöld Premiere: 30. March 2007; International Saxophone Festival, Theatre Stettin, Poland; Harry White, Alto-Saxophono, Philharmonic Orchestra Stettin
- Concerto for Piano and String Orchestra (2005) Premiere: 23. July 2008; "Domleschger Sommerkonzerte"; Soloist: Adrian Oetiker, Bündner Chamber Philharmonic, Conducted by: Marcus Bosch
- Suite for Violoncello and String Orchestra (2004) Premiere: 17. May 2004; National Concert Hall, Taipei, Taiwan; Pi-Chin Chien, Violoncello, Academy of Taiwan Strings
- Concerto for Violoncello and Orchestra (1999) CD-recording 2002; Pi-Chin Chien, Violoncello, Philharmonia Orchestra, London, Conducted by: David Zinman
- Concerto for Violin and Orchestra (1993) Premiere: 14. March 1997; Philharmonic Orchestra Posen (Poland), Soloist: Tomasz Tomaszewski, Conducted by: Marc Andreae.

=== Orchestral songs ===
- «Am Anfang - Drei Versuche die Welt zu erfinden», for Soprano, String Orchestra and Cembalo (2010); Songs of texts by Tim Krohn; Premiere: Lutherse Kerk, Amsterdam; Barockensemble De Swaen, Amsterdam
- «Nachtgesänge» for Mezzo-Soprano and Orchestra (1999); after poems by Hermann Hesse Premiere: 12. January 2001; Tonhalle Zurich; Malena Ernman, Mezzo-Soprano, Tonhalle Orchester Zurich, Conducted by: David Zinman

=== String Orchestra ===
- «Canto» for String orchestra (2015) Premiere: 1. March 2016; Tonhalle Zurich; Zurich Chamber Orchestra
- «Pentaptychon» - Five alpine Images for String orchestra (2015) Premiere: 18. September 2015; Kammerorchester65; Alexandre Clerc
- «Ein Berner namens...» Humorous encore-piece for String orchestra (2012) Premiere: 1. September 2012; Stadttheater Bern; Camerata Bern
- Weinberger Divertimento (2008) Premiere: 23. August 2008; Rainhalle, Rieden, St.Gallen, Switzerland; Weinberger Chamber Orchestra, Conducted by: Gábor Takács-Nagy
- Vokalise (2006) Premiere: 8. Februar 2007 St. Peter church, Zurich; Helvetica Chamber Orchestra, Conducted by: Alexandre Clerc
- Labyrinth (2005) Premiere: October 2005; USA-Tour; Zurich Chamber Orchestra, Conducted by: Howard Griffith
- Rhapsody for String Orchestra (1990) Premiere: 26. July 1991; Bielersee Festival, Switzerland; Nordböhmische Philharmonie, Conducted by: Jost Meier

=== Chamber Music (selection) ===
- Zwiegespräch – Musikalische Reflexion zur Kantate «Liebster Jesu, mein Verlangen» BWV 20 von J. S. Bach. Premiere: 20. January 2017; Reformierte Kirche Trogen AR; Pi-Chin Chien, Violoncello, Bernhard Röthlisberger, Clarinet
- Sonata for Violoncello and Piano No. 3 (2013) Premiere: 13. July 2013; Taiwan, Kaoshiung; Pi-Chin Chien, violoncello, Bernhard Parz, piano
- Sonata for Viola and Piano (2012) Premiere: 31. May 2012; USA, Rochester NY, 40th International Viola Congress, Eastman School of Music; Viacheslav Dinerchtein, Viola
- «The mysterious Mr. Harley Quin» for violin, viola and piano (2011) Character piece inspired by the same figure by Agatha Christie for violin, viola and piano (2011). Commissioned by the Festival «Cully Classique» 2011; Premiere: 25. June 2011; Martyn Jackson, violin, Andrii Malakhov, viola und Joaquim Carr, piano
- String Quartet No. 3, «Über die Zeit» (2011) Premiere: 27. May 2011, Basel, Stadt Casino, Hans Huber Hall; Nathan Quartet
- String Quartet No 4, «1 for 4, 4 for 1» (2011) Premiere: 19. October 2014; Bern; Carmina Quartet
- Sonata for Violoncello and Piano No. 2 (2011) Premiere: 25. February 2013; Cremona; Antonio Meneses, Violoncello, Olga Zadorozhniuk, Piano
- «Munchs Traum(a)» for Violin solo (2010) Premiere: 5. June 2010; Vestfold International Festival 2010, Norway; Henning Kraggerud, Violin
- String Quartet No. 2, «The Helvetic» (2010) Premiere: 26. January 2011; Stadthaus Winterthur; Carmina Quartet
- Duo for Violoncello and Guitar (2009) Premiere: 27. October 2009; Zurich; Mattia Zappa, Violoncello, Admir Doçi, Guitar
- Harlekin-Fantasy for Clarinet and String Quartet (2003) Premiere: 25. April 2004; Castle of Lenzburg; Lux Brahn, clarinet, Sarastro Quartet
- Duo for Violin and Violoncello (2002) Premiere: 9. May 2004; Kongresshaus Zurich; Tomasz Tomaszewski, Violin, Pi-Chin Chien, Violoncello
- String Quartet No. 1 (2001) Premiere: 25. April 2004; Castle of Lenzburg; Sarastro Quartet
- Saxophone Quartet (2000) Premiere: 29. August 2001; Raschèr Saxophone Quartet
- String Trio (1997) Premiere: Tonhalle Zurich; Zurich String Trio

=== Transcriptions (selection) ===
- Ernest Bloch: Baal Shem, Transcription for violin and String Orchestra (2014)
- 20 Transcriptions for Clarinet and String Orchestra of Lieder by Mozart, Schubert, Schumann, Brahms and Grieg; Premiere: 15. October 2013; Radio Studio Zurich; Fabio Di Càsola, clarinet; Zurich Chamber Orchestra, led by: Willi Zimmermann, concert master
- Johan Svendsen: Romance, Op. 26 for String Quintet (2013) Premiere: 22. May 2013; Castle of Lenzburg, Festival Lenzburgiade, Engegård Quartet (Norway)
- Paul Juon: Suite op. 89, for Violin, Violoncello and String Orchestra (2013) (orig. Piano Trio) Premiere: 27. November 2013; National Concert Hall, Taipei; Tan Chen, Violin, Pi-Chin Chien, Violoncello, Academy of Taiwan Strings
- Schubert: 7 Lieder, arranged for Soprano und String Orchestra (2009) Premiere: 5. September 2009; Sandra Trattnigg, Soprano, Weinberger Chamber Orchestra, Conducted by: Gábor Takács-Nagy
- Mendelssohn: Sommernachtstraum, Scherzo for String Orchestra (2007)
- Niccolò Paganini: Moto perpetuo Op. 11 for String Orchestra (2006)
- Max Bruch: Swedish Dances for Violin and String Orchestra (1992) (orig. Violin & Piano)

=== Stage works ===
- «Eiger» Opera in one Act (2019/20); After a Libretto by Tim Krohn Premiere: 17. December 2021; Theater Orchester Biel Solothurn TOBS; Barbara-David Brüesch, Regie; Alain Rappaport, stage design; Musical direction: Kaspar Zehnder
- «Der letzte Ta...kt» Short Opera (2009); After a Libretto by Peter Zeindler Premiere: 17. Oktober 2019; Kammertheater Stok, Zurich; "Oper im Knopfloch"

== Discography ==
- 2020: «Strings on the Move» Concertino for piano 4 hands, cello and string orchestra; Pi-Chin Chien, violoncello, Piano Duo Zbinden, Klaipeda Chamber Orchestra Estonian Recording Production ERP
- 2019: «Tea for Two Cellos» Pi-Chin Chien & Fabian Müller, violoncello Solo Musica
- 2016: «Am Anfang - Drei Versuche die Welt zu erfinden»; Christiane Boesiger, Soprano, Zurich Ensemble ARS Produktion
- 2015: «Concerto per Klee» for Violoncello and String orchestra & 2 horns; Pi-Chin Chien, violoncello, Georgisches Kammerorchester Ingolstadt, Ruben Gazarian ARS Produktion
- 2014: «Taiwan Rhapsody» and «Six Taiwanese Songs», romantic musical settings for cello and orchestra; Pi-Chin Chien, violoncello, Royal Philharmonic Orchestra, Wen-Pin Chien Sony Classical
- 2013: Portrait-CD: Eiger (2004), Concerto for Orchestra (2007/08), «Dialogues Cellestes», Antonio Meneses & Pi-Chin Chien, violoncello, Royal Philharmonic Orchestra, Claude Villaret / ARS Produktion
- 2013: "Munchs Traum(a) for Violin Solo (2010), Henning Kraggerud, violine, / SIMAX Classics
- 2013 Fabian Müller: 20 Transcriptions of songs by Mozart, Schubert, Schumann, Brahms and Grieg for clarinet and string orchestra; Fabio Di Casola, clarinet, Zurich Chamber Orchestra, / Sony Classical
- 2007 Chamber music for cello and piano by Paul Juon, Othmar Schoeck and Fabian Müller; Pi-Chin Chien, cello, Adrian Oetiker, piano / Musiques Suisses
- 2006 Portrait-CD; Fabian Müller: Piano Concerto, Labyrinth, Suite for cello and string orchestra, «Lied des Einsamen», Pi-Chin Chien, cello, Adrian Oetiker, piano, Harry White, saxophone, Zurich Chamber Orchestra, Ruben Gazarian, conductor; Musiques Suisses
- 2004 Fabian Müller: Chamber music for strings; Petersen Quartet; Tomasz Tomaszewski, violin; Pi-Chin Chien, cello; Andreas Wylezol, double-bass; «20th Century Portraits», / Capriccio
- 2003 Fabian Müller: Five Intermezzi for alto-saxophone solo, Harry White, saxophone; Deutsche Grammophon
- 2002 Portrait-CD; Fabian Müller: «Nachtgesänge», Cello Concerto 1999, Intrada, Gayatri-Rhapsody; Malena Ernman, mezzo-soprano; Pi-Chin Chien, cello; Philharmonia Orchestra, London; David Zinman, conductor, col legno
- 1995 Fabian Müller: Violin Concerto 1993, Suite Vaudoise, Rhapsody for String Orchestra, «Nachtgesänge»; MDS Classics
