= Fred Åkerström grant =

- Awarded for: Developing, preserving, or creating visor
- Location: Västervik
- Country: Sweden
- Presented by: Visfestivalen
- Reward: 40 000 SEK
- First award: 1987
- Website: visfestivalenvastervik.se

Fred Åkeström grant is an allowance granted every year to "a person who has worked in a significant way to preserve, develop, and / or create Swedish visor." It was named after Fred Åkerström. The custom began in 1987 by the Visfestivalen i Västervik (transl. The song festival in Västervik) in collaboration with Länsförsäkringar. The grant is awarded during the Visfestival and the prize money is 40,000 krona.

== Grant winners ==
- 1987 – Lasse Tennander
- 1988 – Åsa Jinder
- 1989 – Ewert Ljusberg
- 1990 – Lena Willemark
- 1991 – Lars Demian
- 1992 – Per Persson
- 1993 – Mikael Samuelson & Mats Bergström
- 1994 – Ola Magnell
- 1995 – Thorstein Bergman
- 1996 – Stefan Sundström
- 1997 – Finn Zetterholm
- 1998 – Björn Ulvaeus
- 1999 – Margareta Kjellberg
- 2000 – Olle Adolphson
- 2001 – Anders Burman
- 2002 – Kjell Höglund
- 2003 – Mats Klingström
- 2004 – Christina Kjellsson
- 2005 – CajsaStina Åkerström
- 2006 – Dan Viktor Andersson
- 2007 – Alf Hambe
- 2008 – Jack Vreeswijk
- 2009 – Marie Bergman
- 2010 – Sanna Carlstedt
- 2011 – Bengt Sändh
- 2012 – Stefan Andersson
- 2013 – Hansi Schwarz
