= Ashes to Ashes (Anna Bergendahl song) =

Single by Anna Bergendahl
- Released: 23 February 2019
- Length: 3:00
- Label: Freebird Entertainment
- Songwriter(s): Thomas G:Son; Bobby Ljunggren; Erik Bernholm; Anna Bergendahl
- Producer(s): Erik Bernholm

Anna Bergendahl singles chronology
"Just Another Christmas" (2018)	"Ashes to Ashes" (2019)	"Home" (2019)

"Ashes to Ashes" is a song by Swedish singer Anna Bergendahl. The song was performed for the first time in Melodifestivalen 2019, where it made it to the final. This is the first song for Bergendahl in Melodifestivalen since winning the competition in 2010.

== Charts ==
Chart performance for "Ashes to Ashes"
Chart (2019)	Peak position
Sweden (Sverigetopplistan)	12
