= Alf Hambe =

Swedish singer (1931–2022)

Alf Gunnar Hambe
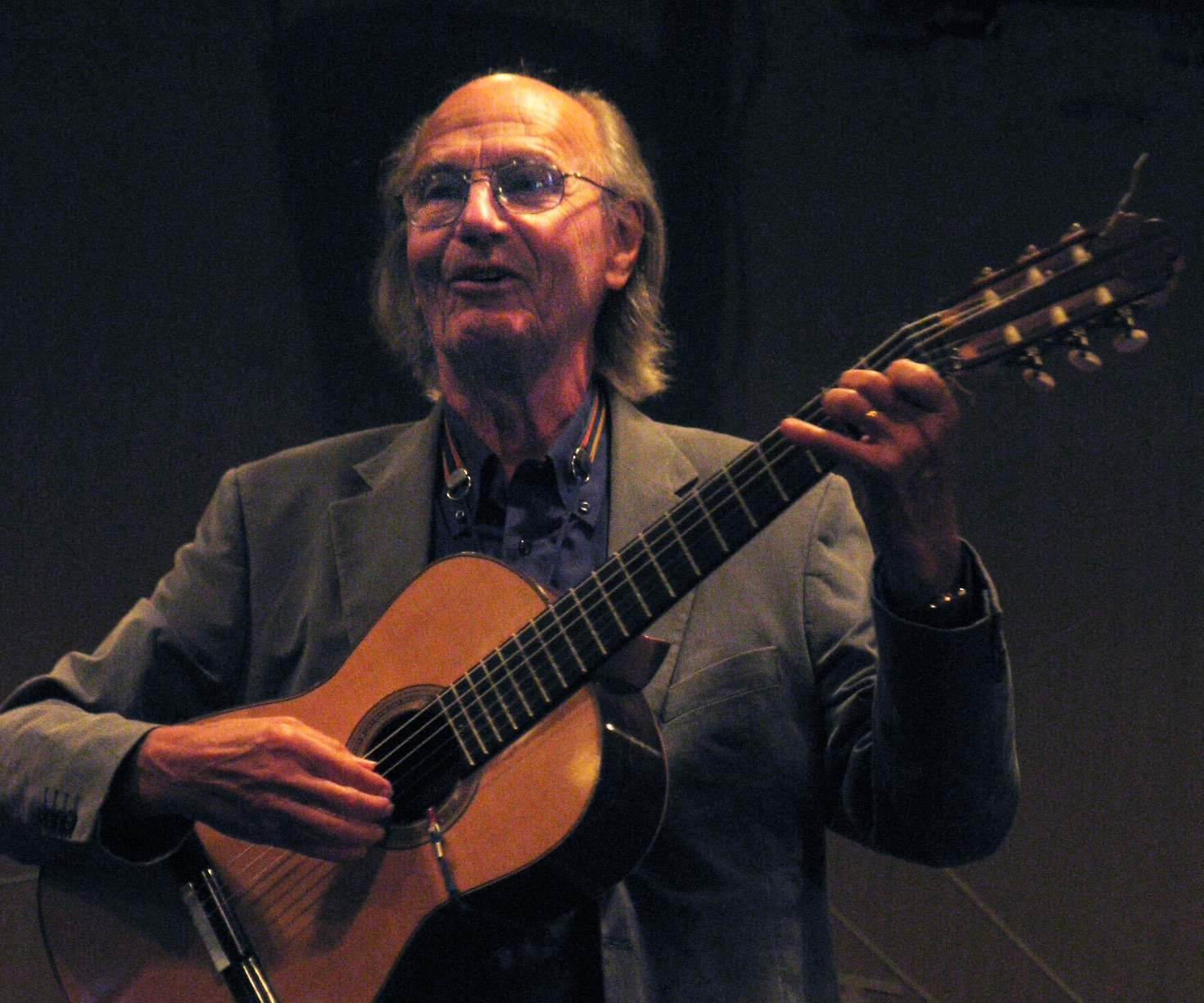
- Hambe in 2011

Background information
- Born: 24 January 1931; Rävinge, Halland, Sweden
- Died: 6 May 2022 (aged 91) Steninge, Halland, Sweden
- Occupation(s): Composer, author, singer
- Years active: 1959–2019

Alf Gunnar Hambe (24 January 1931 – 6 May 2022) was a Swedish author, composer, and singer-songwriter, who was influential in the genre of Swedish ballads (visor).

Hambe was born in Rävinge near Halmstad in Halland, on the west coast of Sweden. His father, Johan Hambe, was a teacher and headmaster at the local primary school, and also played the piano and wrote poetry. Alf Hambe went to secondary school in Halmstad. After his graduation (studentexamen) in 1951, he studied in Helsingborg to become a primary school teacher. He moved to Gothenburg in 1956, and had several temporary teaching jobs until the mid 1960s, when he became a full-time author, composer and singer. In 1967 he returned to Halland with his family and lived in Steninge for the rest of his life.

Hambe wrote more than 500 songs and poems, often inspired by the nature surrounding the place where he lived, and released more than 20 records. What made him original was his poetic and very personal way of using the Swedish language, sometimes by creating new words. He received many prizes and stipends during his lifetime, including the Evert Taube grant in 1979 and 1990, the Fred Åkerström grant in 2007, and the royal medal Litteris et Artibus in 2008.
