= Malena Ernman =

Swedish opera singer (born 1970)

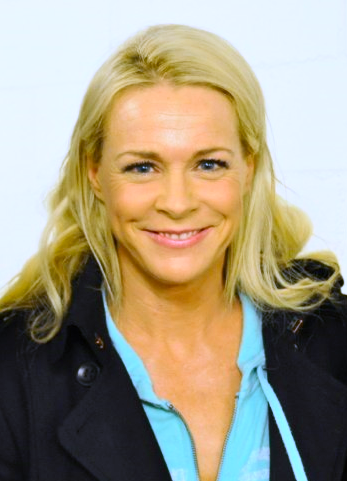
- Ernman in 2012
- Born: Sara Magdalena Ernman; 4 November 1970 (age 55); Uppsala, Sweden
- Occupation: Singer
- Spouse: Svante Thunberg (m. 2004)
- Children: 2, including Greta Thunberg
- Relatives: Olof Thunberg (father-in-law)
- Musical career
- Genres: Opera; jazz; baroque pop; chanson; cabaret
- Years active: 1998–present
- Labels: Bis; Sony; Opus Arte; Roxy Recordings Stockholm

Sara Magdalena Ernman (born 4 November 1970), known professionally as Malena Ernman, is a Swedish mezzo-soprano opera singer. Besides operas and operettas, she has also performed chansons, cabaret, jazz, and appeared in musicals. She is a member of the Royal Swedish Academy of Music. Ernman represented Sweden in the Eurovision Song Contest 2009 with the song "La Voix", finishing in 21st place.

== Life and career ==
=== Early life ===
Ernman was born in Uppsala, Sweden, and spent her childhood and school years in Sandviken. She was educated at the Royal College of Music in Stockholm, the Music Conservatory in Orléans, France, and the school of the Royal Swedish Opera.

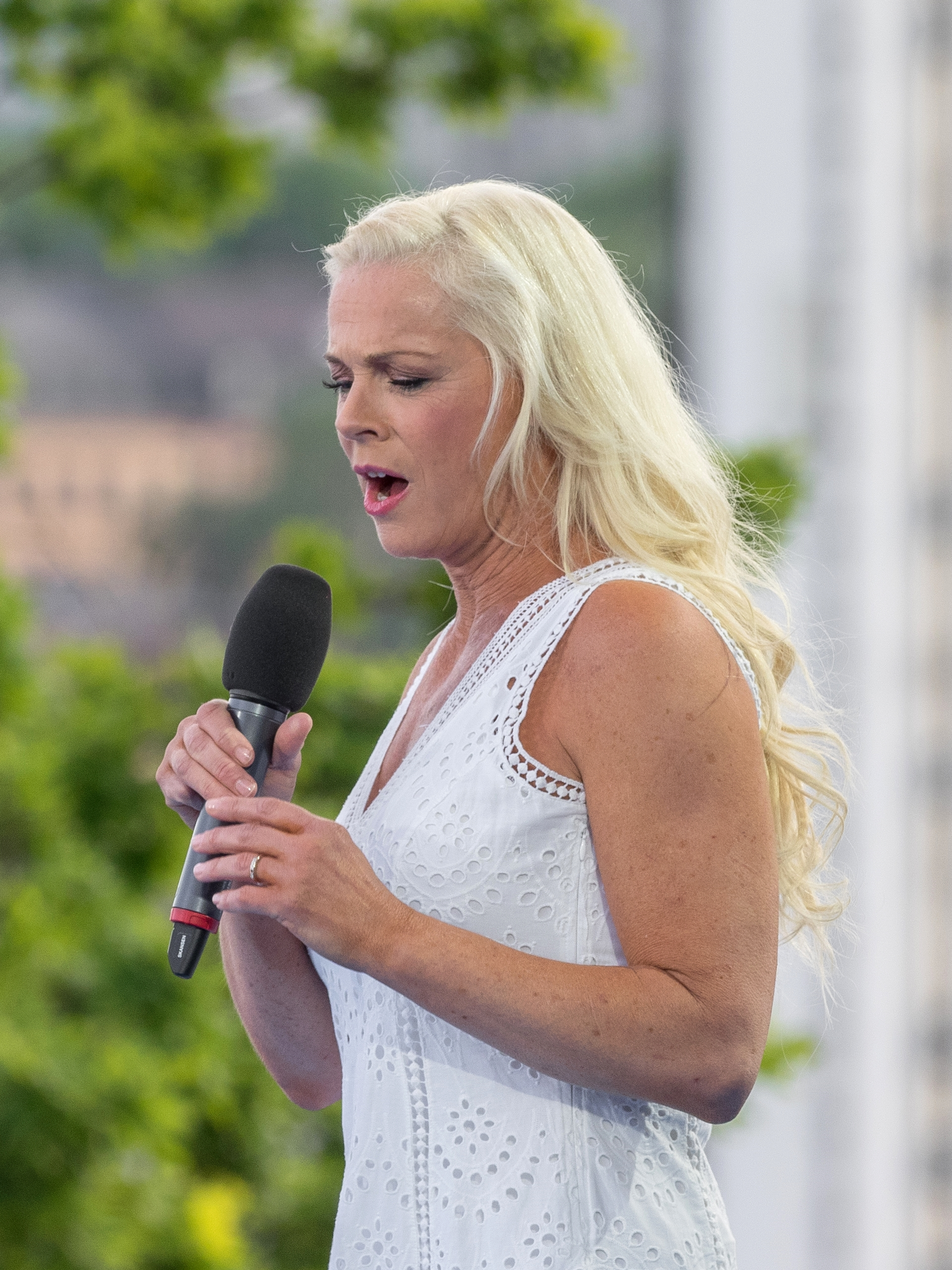
Ernman performing at Skansen in Stockholm during the Swedish National Day in June 2016

=== Operas ===
In 1997, Ernman sang in the premiere of Ivar Hallström's 1897 opera Liten Karin in Vadstena; Opera magazine noted that "the mezzo Malena Ernman was very expressive as Princess Cecilia, King Erik XIV's sister". In 1998, her Rosina in The Barber of Seville at the Royal Opera in Stockholm was described as "displaying impressive technique" and "shaping the character with mocking good humour". The same year, she sang Kaja in the premiere of Sven-David Sandström's Staden under Leif Segerstam also at the Royal Opera in Stockholm, where one reviewer commented that "in vocal focus and expression, her full, rich voice is not that far behind Bartoli". In July 1999, Ernman sang the trouser role of Ziöberg in the premiere of Jonas Forssell's Trädgården (The Garden) at the Drottningholm Palace Theatre in Stockholm, conducted by Roy Goodman, the first new opera to be premiered at the theatre in modern times.

In Brussels in 2000, her Nerone in Handel's Agrippina, alongside Rosemary Joshua's Poppea and Anna Caterina Antonacci's Aggripina was described as "the most convincingly brattish young man imaginable".

In 2001, Ernman sang Sesto in Handel's Giulio Cesare at the Drottningholm Festival. She sang at the Glyndebourne Festival, in the Summer of 2002 as Nancy in Albert Herring and the next summer as Prince Orlovsky in Johann Strauss's Die Fledermaus, which was also performed at the BBC Proms that year.

In 2002/2003 Ernman appeared in Vienna as Diana in La Calisto. In 2003/2004 she sang the part of Donna Elvira in Don Giovanni at La Monnaie in Brussels and appeared at the Aix-en-Provence Festival as Lichas in Hercules by George Frideric Handel, with Les Arts Florissants under conductor William Christie, revived at the Paris Opera and at the Vienna Festival.

In the spring and summer of 2005, Ernman created the title role in Philippe Boesmans's Julie, appearing at la Monnaie, at the Vienna Festival, and in Aix-en-Provence. In 2006 she sang as Nerone in L'incoronazione di Poppea in Brussels and Berlin, then as Dido in Dido and Aeneas with William Christie at the Vienna Festival. She also sang in Agrippina at Oper Frankfurt.

In August 2006, Ernman made her debut at the Salzburg Festival as Annio in La clemenza di Tito under conductor Nikolaus Harnoncourt. In 2007, her roles included Sesto in Giulio Cesare with René Jacobs in Vienna, Cherubino in Le nozze di Figaro with Daniel Harding in Aix-en-Provence, and Nerone in L'incoronazione di Poppea in Amsterdam. In 2008 she sang Angelina in La Cenerentola with the Royal Swedish Opera and Dido and Aeneas with Christie and the Opéra-Comique in Paris. In 2009 she reprised Angelina in La Cenerentola with Oper Frankfurt and the Swedish Royal Opera, and Dido in Dido and Aeneas with Christie in Vienna and Amsterdam. In 2010, she sang the castrato role of Idamante in Idomeneo under Jérémie Rhorer at the Theatre de la Monnaie in Brussels, where her "feisty" portrayal of the prince was "as if to the gender born, her efforts rewarded by the inclusion of the usually cut aria 'No, la morte'. Vienna saw her in the title role of Serse by Handel in October 2011 at the Theater an der Wien, and the following season she sang Eduige in the Nicolas Harnoncourt-led production of Handel's Rodelinda at the same house, later released on DVD. Back in the city as Elena in La donna del lago in August 2012, she was "impressive... dealing with the vocal difficulties with aplomb and managing the extra dramatic demands made on her with genuine expressivity". She added Béatrice to her repertoire in 2013 in performances at Theater an der Wien of Berlioz's late opéra-comique. Also in 2013 she returned to the part of Aggripina at the Gran Teatre del Liceu in Barcelona, in a production by David McVicar conducted by Harry Bicket.

Ernman has sung several major roles with the Staatsoper Berlin, including Cherubino in Le nozze di Figaro and Zerlina in Don Giovanni, both under conductor Daniel Barenboim. She also performed Rosina in Rossini's Il barbiere di Siviglia with Staatsoper Berlin and the Finnish National Opera. With the Royal Opera Stockholm she has also sung the title role in Carmen.

Ernman worked with conductor René Jacobs in the roles of Nerone in Agrippina, Roberto in Scarlatti's Griselda and Diana in Cavalli's La Calisto.

In 2018, she sang Gabriella in the Swedish musical Så som i himmelen (As It Is in Heaven), based on a 2004 film of the same name, with words by Kay Pollak and Carin Pollak and the score by Fredrik Kempe, which premiered at the Oscarsteatern in September 2018.

=== Concerts ===
Early recitals on Swedish Radio included Rachmaninov in 1994, The airconditioned nightmare by Olov Olofsson, songs by Gunnar de Frumerie, and an eclectic mix of Fauré, Debussy, Jolivet, Ravel, Bizet, Barber, Ives and Lehrer in 1996, Brahms lieder, and works by Carlid, Mahler and Berio in 1998. Ernman has performed several concert pieces as well. At the Salzburg Festival she sang Mozart's "Waisenhausmesse" with conductor Frans Brüggen. She performed Berio's "Folksongs" with the Stockholm Royal Philharmonic Orchestra under Carlo Rizzi, and at the Verbier Festival with Gustavo Dudamel. She sang the world premiere of "Nachtgesänge" by Fabian Müller with the Zurich Tonhalle Orchestra. In Minneapolis she sang Mozart's "Requiem" with Arnold Östman.

=== 2009 Melodifestivalen and Eurovision ===
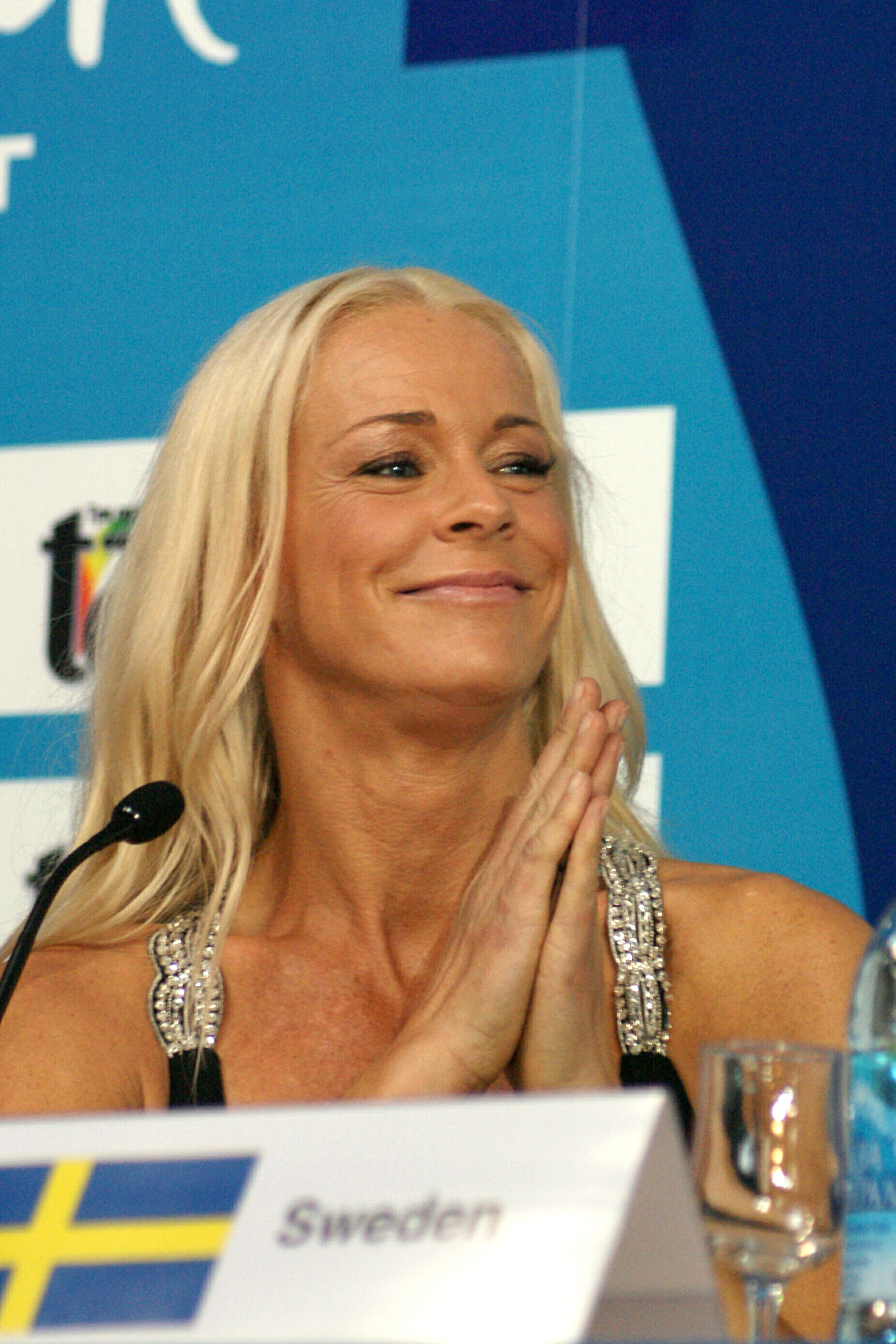
Ernman at the Eurovision Song Contest 2009

On 28 November 2008, it was announced that Ernman would enter Melodifestivalen 2009 for the Eurovision Song Contest 2009 with the song "La voix," written by Fredrik Kempe. On 28 February 2009, Ernman competed in the 4th semi-final of Melodifestivalen in Malmö and became a finalist. She went on to win the final on 14 March at the Globe Arena in Stockholm, and to represent Sweden in the Eurovision Song Contest in Moscow. She qualified as a finalist on 12 May and performed in the finals on 16 May, where she finished 21st with 33 points. "La voix" was the first Swedish entry to contain a substantial amount of French lyrics; it was written by Ernman herself, who speaks French fluently. Prior to the competition a documentary about the life and career of Ernman was broadcast on Swedish television entitled 'Rösternas Malena' ('The voice of Malena').

Ernman revealed that the dress for her Eurovision performance cost 400,000 kronor (€37,471) and was made by designer Camilla Thulin. Singer Dea Norberg joined Ernman as one of the choirgirls. Ernman later participated in the Second Chance round of Melodifestivalen 2015 as a guest singer for Behrang Miri's entry.

== Personal life ==
Ernman is married to actor Svante Thunberg, with whom she had appeared in a 2000 Swedish television musical documentary about the composer Joseph Martin Kraus, played by Thunberg. Their first daughter, activist Greta Thunberg, rose to worldwide prominence when she initiated the School Strike for Climate. Their second daughter, singer Beata Andersson (formerly Ernman-Thunberg), is 3 years younger than Greta. Ernman's career was taking off when Greta was born, and Svante stayed at home to look after their daughters.

In August 2014, 11-year-old Greta suddenly stopped talking, reading, and did not want to eat or do anything. This condition lasted for several months, until she was diagnosed with Asperger syndrome. The acute period of her daughter's condition affected Ernman and her family to such an extent that she had three breakdowns during her professional activity and five performances had to be cancelled. After the crisis was overcome, she turned to the nationwide daily newspaper Expressen, which reported it in detail, because she wanted to help other families in a similar situation.

Ernman has been politically active in support of the Paris Agreement; in June 2017 she wrote a collaborative debate piece in Dagens Nyheter. With her husband, she co-wrote the book Scenes from the Heart about her family, the environment, and sustainability. It was published in August 2018.

== Awards ==
- 2010: appointed Hovsångerska (lit. "[royal] court singer") by Carl XVI Gustaf of Sweden
- 2017: WWF-Sweden "Environmental Hero of the Year"

== Discography ==
=== Albums ===
- 2000: Naïve (KMH) – songs by Olov Olofsson, Bo Linde, Bror Samuelson, Sandström, among others, with ensemble directed by Chrichan Larson
- 2001: Cabaret Songs – songs by William Bolcom, Kurt Weill, Friedrich Hollander and Benjamin Britten; with Bengt-Åke Lundin, piano (BIS)
- 2003: Songs in Season (Nytorp Musik) – songs related to nature and the seasons by Mendelssohn, Grieg, Respighi, Storm, Copland, Koechlin, Mahler, Gefors, Schreker, Fauré, Liszt, Finzi, Sibelius, Tchaikovsky, and Jennefelt. With Francisca Skoogh (piano), recorded in January 2002 at Swedish Radio in Stockholm.
- 2003: My Love – opera arias (by Rossini, Bizet, Mozart) and songs (by Ravel, Legrand, Mozart, Schubert, Ellington, Lindberg, Nilsson) arranged with guitar accompaniment from Mats Bergström (BIS)
- 2009: La Voix du Nord – 'pop works', 'One Step From Paradise', 'La voix', 'Min plats på jorden', 'Sempre libera', 'What Becomes of Love', 'Un bel dì', 'Breathless Days', 'Perdus', 'Tragedy', 'All the Lost Tomorrows'; and arias 'Quando me n'vò' (Puccini), 'Voi che sapete' (Mozart), Solveig's song from Peer Gynt (Grieg), 'O mio babbino caro' (Puccini), 'Vedrai, carino' (Mozart), 'Una voce poco fa' (Rossini), 'Lascia ch'io pianga' (Händel), 'Caro mio ben' (Giordani), 'Non più mesta' (Rossini), 'Ombra mai fu' (Händel) and 'When I am laid in earth' (Purcell), conducted by Alberto Hold-Garrido. The record is dedicated to "my daughters Greta and Beata and to my husband Svante".
- 2010: Santa Lucia – En klassisk jul (Christmas album)
- 2011: Opera di Fiori (Roxy Recordings/Universal)
- 2013: I decembertid
- 2014: SDS (Fyra sånger för Malena and Missa brevis by Sven-David Sandström, with the Musica Vitae, Gustaf Sjökvist Kammarkör conducted by Gustaf Sjökvist)
- 2015: Advent
- 2016: Sverige
- 2025: Terra Mater, together with Christina Pluhar

Others

- Alfred Schnittke: Symphony No. 2 'St. Florian'; Mikaeli Chamber Choir, Royal Stockholm Philharmonic conducted by Leif Segerstam, with Göran Eliasson, Mikael Bellini, Torkel Borelius (BIS, 1995)
- Nachtgesänge – song-cycle by Fabian Müller, with the Philharmonia Orchestra, conducted by David Zinman (Col legno)
- Maurice Duruflé: Requiem, Op. 9 with the Swedish Radio Choir. Recorded 2004, Stockholm.
- Sven-David Sandström: The High Mass, with the Gewandhaus Orchester Leipzig & MDR Chor Leipzig, Herbert Blomstedt. DG, 2005
- Romantic Swedish Vocal Works Vol. 2, with Olle Persson, Bengt-Åke Lundin. Includes Gustav Nordqvist: Tre Bo Bergman-dikter; Ingemar Liljefors: Tre Sånger "Den utvalda", Jag vantar manen, and Lagg din hand i min om du har lust; Åke Uddén: Tre Sånger ur Chansons de Bilitis; Hilding Hallnäs: Fem Dikter "I skogen om natten", Op. 17. (Phono Suecia, 2005)
- Berio: Folk Songs – part of 'Verbier Festival: 25 Years of Excellence', with the Verbier Festival Orchestra conducted by Gustavo Dudamel (recorded July 2005) (Deutsche Grammophon)
- Arias by Johann Christoph Bach "Ach, daß ich Wassers genug hätte", Bacri "Lamento", and JS Bach "Wie jammern mich doch die verkehrten Herzen" from Cantata BWV 170, with Ensemble Matheus, directed by Jean-Christophe Spinosi, part of 'Miroirs' (2013, Deutsche Grammophon)
- Mozart: Così fan tutte, K588; with Christopher Maltman, Simone Kermes, Kenneth Tarver, Konstantin Wolff, Anna Kasyan; MusicAeterna, Teodor Currentzis (Sony, 2014) – as Dorabella

=== Singles ===
- 2009: "La voix" - sung at the Eurovision Song Contest 2009
- 2010: "Min plats på jorden"

== DVD ==
- Strauss: Die Fledermaus with Pamela Armstrong, Thomas Allen, Lyubov Petrova, Håkan Hagegård, London Philharmonic Orchestra, Vladimir Jurowski. Filmed at Glyndebourne 2003 (Opus Arte) – Prince Orlovsky.
- Handel: Hercules with William Shimell, Joyce DiDonato, Toby Spence, Les Arts Florissants, William Christie. Filmed at the Festival d'Aix-en-Provence 2004 (Bel Air Classiques) – Lichas.
- Boesmans: Julie with Gary Magee, Kerstin Avemo, the Chamber Orchestra of la Monnaie, Kazushi Ono. Aix-en Provence 2005 (Bel Air Classiques) – title role.
- Purcell: Dido and Aeneas with Christopher Maltman, Les Arts Florissants, William Christie (conductor). Filmed at the Paris Opéra Comique 2008 (FRA) – Dido.
- Handel: Rodelinda with Danielle de Niese, Bejun Mehta, Kurt Streit, Concentus Musicus Wien, Nikolaus Harnoncourt. Filmed at the Theater an der Wien, 2011 (Belvedere) – Eduige.
- Mozart: Don Giovanni with Erwin Schrott, Anna Netrebko, Luca Pisaroni, Charles Castronovo, Katija Dragojevic, Balthasar-Neumann-Orchestra, Thomas Hengelbrock (Sony) 2013 – Donna Elvira.

== See also ==
- Flight shame (aka 'Flygskam')

Preceded by Charlotte Perrelli with "Hero"	Sweden in the Eurovision Song Contest; 2009	Succeeded by Anna Bergendahl with "This Is My Life"
