= Olof Thunberg =

Swedish actor (1925–2020)

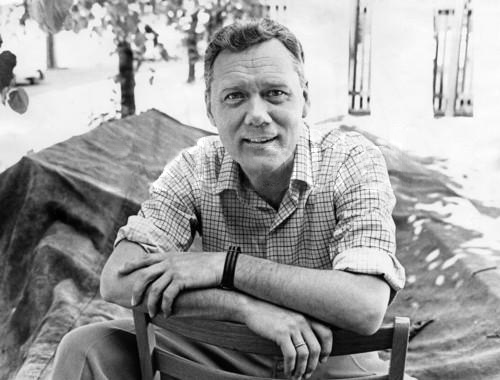
- Thunberg in 1968
- Born: Fritz-Olof Thunberg; 21 May 1925; Västerås, Sweden
- Died: 24 February 2020 (aged 94); Stockholm, Sweden
- Occupations: Actor; director
- Spouse(s): Ingrid Johansson (m. 1950; div. 1954) Mona Andersson (m. 1978; div. 1990)
- Partner(s): Lena Granhagen (engaged 1959–?)
- Children: 2, including Svante Thunberg
- Relatives: Greta Thunberg (granddaughter); Malena Ernman (daughter-in-law)

Signature
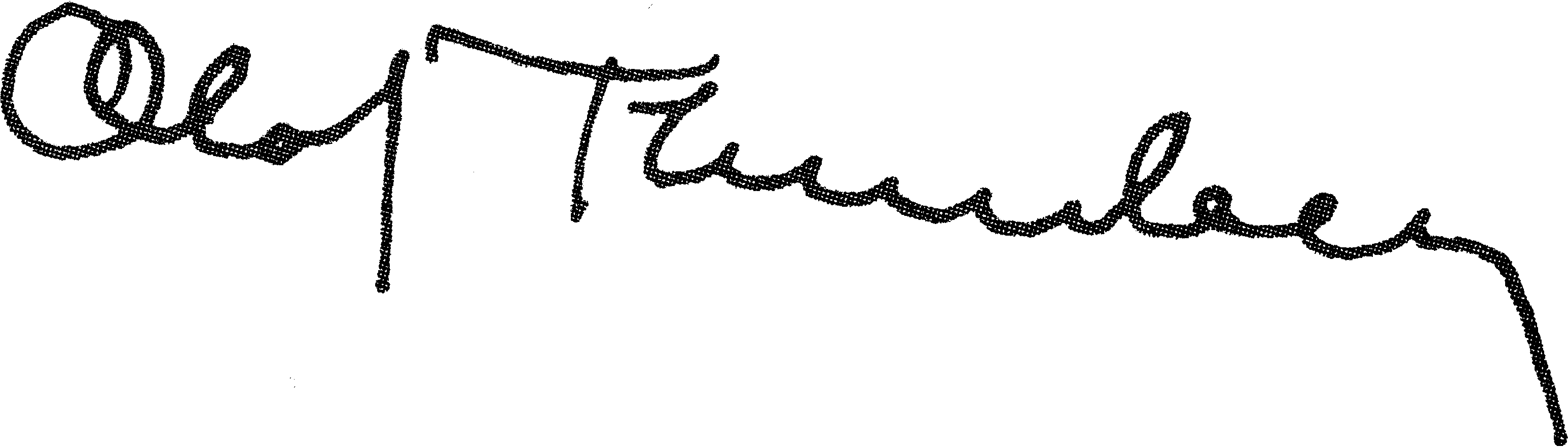

Fritz-Olof Thunberg (21 May 1925 – 24 February 2020) was a Swedish actor and director. He was perhaps best known for being the voice of the cartoon character Bamse.

== Early life and career ==
Thunberg was born Fritz-Olof Thunberg in Västerås, where he formed a theatre club called Scenklubben which also included Lars Ekborg and the poet Bo Setterlind. He studied at Calle Flygare's drama school in Stockholm and then from 1950 to 1952 at the Royal Dramatic Training Academy; between the two, in the late 1940s, he performed in public parks.

After finishing drama school, Thunberg joined the provincial Östgöta Theatre (Östgötateatern), where he directed in addition to acting, then became a freelance actor. In the 1950s, he became known for his work on the radio programme Mannen i svart ("The Man in Black"), where he presented all kinds of stories of horror and the supernatural in his deep voice, accompanied by a variety of sound effects. In 1963, he had a supporting role in Ingmar Bergman's drama Winter Light as the church organist Fredrik.

Thunberg appeared in a variety of films, often in a supporting role as a confident charmer, and is the voice of both Bamse and Agaton Sax in children's films and recordings. He also voiced Shere Khan in the Swedish-dubbed versions of both the 1967 Disney The Jungle Book and its 2003 sequel, The Jungle Book 2.

In 2006, Thunberg was a host of Sommar on Sveriges Radio P1.

Thunberg also directed for television.

== Personal life ==
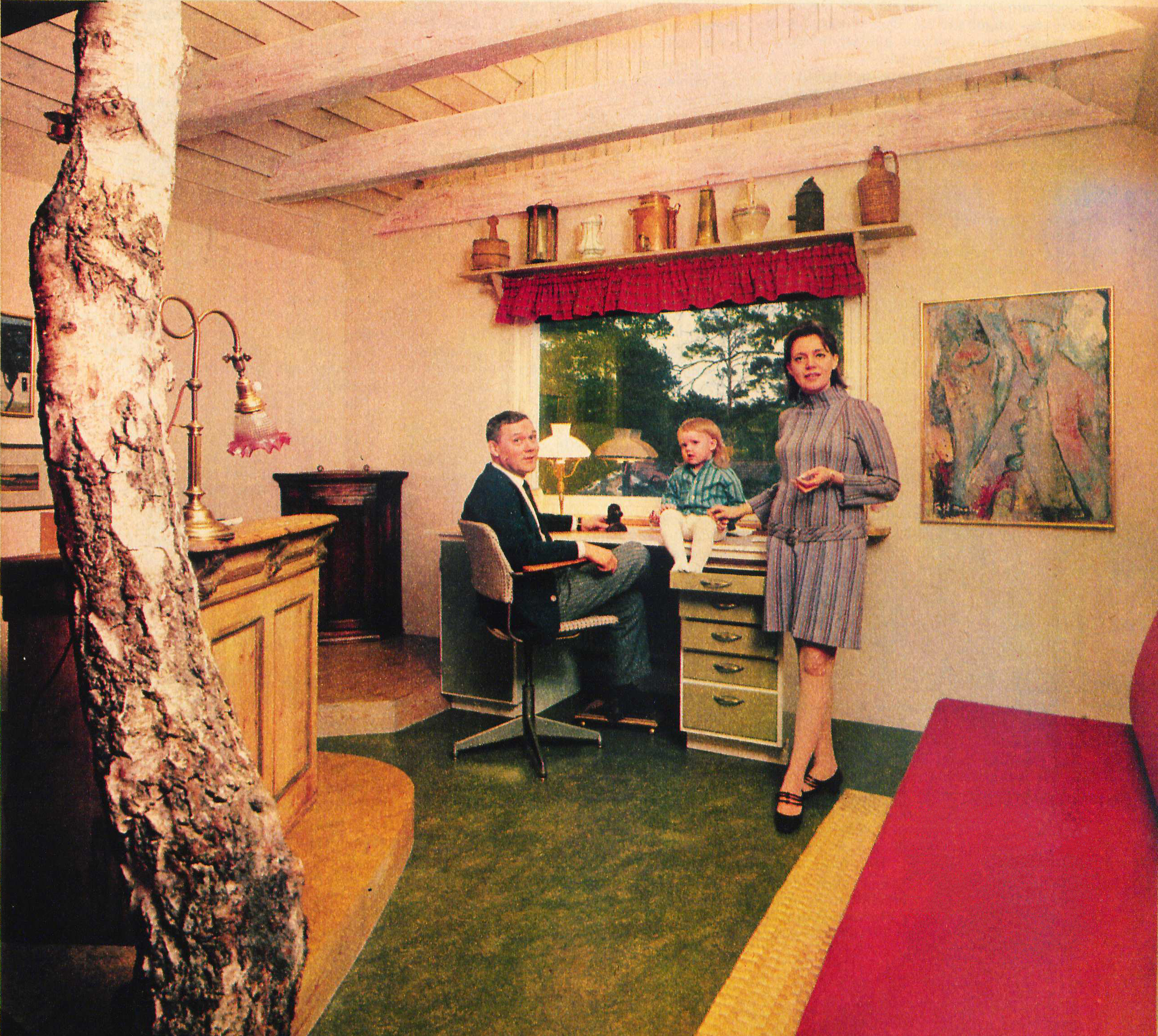
Olof Thunberg with Mona Andersson and their first-born daughter Amanda at their home in Värmdö, 1967

Thunberg was previously married to Ingrid Johansson. He had a later cohabitation with actress Mona Andersson, whom he got to know in connection with a radio play. He was the father of actor Svante Thunberg and father-in-law of opera singer Malena Ernman, from whom his granddaughter is the climate activist Greta Thunberg.

In 1959, Thunberg became engaged to actress Lena Granhagen, whom he had met while directing a play in which she acted in at Intiman. They lived together into the 1960s, and they acted together as a couple in the television series Villervalle i Söderhavet in 1963.

Thunberg died on 24 February 2020, at the age of 94.

== Selected filmography ==
- 1948 – De kämpade sig till frihet
- 1953 – I dur och skur
- 1953 – The Beat of Wings in the Night
- 1954 – Laugh Bomb
- 1955 – Lady and the Tramp Trusty (Swedish voice; also in 1989 re-dub); Boris (in original 1955 dub only)
- 1955 – Wild Birds
- 1955 – People of the Finnish Forests
- 1956 – 7 vackra flickor
- 1957 – A Dreamer's Journey
- 1957 – The Halo Is Slipping
- 1957 – The Minister of Uddarbo
- 1957 – Vägen genom Skå
- 1958 – Fridolf Stands Up!
- 1959 – Fröken Chic (uncredited)
- 1959 – A Lion in Town
- 1960 – The Die Is Cast
- 1960 – Summer and Sinners
- 1961 – One Hundred and One Dalmatians: Colonel (Swedish voice, original 1961 dub only)
- 1961 – Pärlemor
- 1963 – Det är hos mig han har varit
- 1963 – Winter Light
- 1963 – Adam och Eva
- 1963 – Prins Hatt under jorden
- 1964 – Äktenskapsbrottaren
- 1967 – The Jungle Book: Shere Khan (Swedish voice)
- 1968 – Villervalle i Söderhavet
- 1976 – Smurfarna och den förtrollade flöjten: narrator, Fräckelin (voice)
- 1977 – The Rescuers: Rufus (Swedish voice)
- 1980 – Sverige åt svenskarna
- 1981 – The Fox and the Hound: Grumpy Badger (Swedish voice)
- 1982 – Snow White and the Seven Dwarfs: Grumpy (Swedish voice)
- 1986 – Amorosa
- 1988 – The Land Before Time: narrator (Swedish voice)
- 1996 – Monopol
- 1996 – Lilla Jönssonligan och cornflakeskuppen
- 1997 – Lilla Jönssonligan på styva linan
- 2001 – Lady and the Tramp II: Scamp's Adventure: Trusty (Swedish voice)
- 2001 – Monsters, Inc.: C.E.O. Henry J. Waternoose III (Swedish voice)
- 2003 – The Jungle Book 2: Shere Khan (Swedish voice)

== Selected television appearances ==
- 1963 – Villervalle i Söderhavet (series)
- 1965 – En historia till fredag (series)
- 1965 – Niklasons (series)
- 1966 – Mästerdetektiven Blomkvist på nya äventyr
- 1968 – Lärda fruntimmer
- 1968 – Pygmalion
- 1968 – Markurells i Wadköping (series)
- 1969 – Biprodukten
- 1969 – Håll polisen utanför (series)
- 1970 – Röda rummet (series)
- 1970 – Regnbågslandet (series)
- 1970 – Ett dockhem
- 1972–1974 – Bröderna Malm (series)
- 1972–1973 – Bamse (series): narrator, voices
- 1973 – Ett köpmanshus i skärgården (TV-serie)
- 1981 – Bamse och den lilla åsnan: narrator, voices
- 1982 – Dubbelsvindlarna (series)
- 1991 – Bamse i Trollskogen: narrator, voices
- 1991 – Storstad (series)
- 1991 – Sunes jul (series)
- 1993 – Allis med is (series)
- 1994 – Tre Kronor (series)
- 1995 – Sjukan (series)
- 1995 – Jeppe på berget (series)
- 2001 – Återkomsten (series)
- 2003 – Solbacken: Avd. E (series)

== Selected directions ==
- 1972 – Söndagspromenaden (TV)
- 1969 – Galgmannen (TV)
