= Anna Bergendahl =

Swedish singer (born 1991)

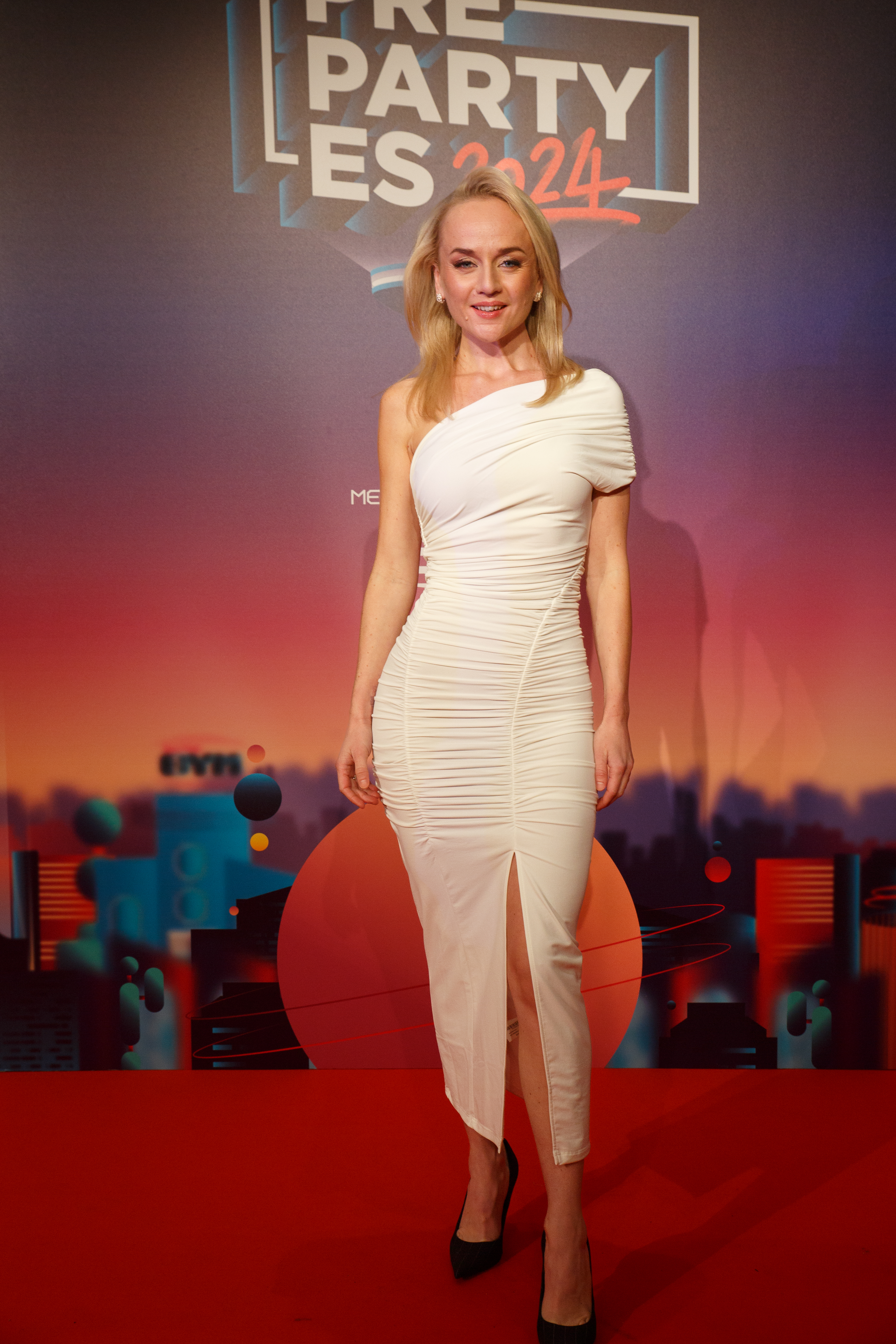
- Bergendahl in 2024

Background information
- Born: Anna Henrietta Bergendahl; 11 December 1991 (age 34); Stockholm, Sweden
- Genres: Pop; folk-pop; country pop
- Years active: 2008–present
- Labels: Freebird Entertainment; Lionheart Music Group; Universal Music Group
- Website: annabergendahl.com

Anna Henrietta Bergendahl (born 11 December 1991) is a Swedish singer and songwriter. She took part in Swedish TV4 music program Super Troupers in 2004, and in Idol 2008 where she reached the Final 5 before being eliminated.

In 2009, Bergendahl signed for Lionheart Records. Her debut album was released on 14 April 2010. Bergendahl won Melodifestivalen 2010 with the song "This Is My Life" and represented Sweden in the Eurovision Song Contest 2010. However, she did not qualify for the final, because she finished 11th in the second semi-final with 62 points. The song topped the Swedish Singles Chart on 5 March 2010.

== Biography ==
=== Early life ===
Bergendahl was born in Hägersten, Stockholm, and raised in Nyköping and Katrineholm. She is of partial Irish descent, as her grandmother was born and lives in Ireland. Her first performance in front of an audience was in a cathedral in York when she was only eight years old.

=== Idol 2008 ===
Bergendahl successfully applied for the TV4 talent show Idol 2008 with her rendition of Bonnie Raitt's "Have a Heart", which received praise from the jury consisting of Laila Bagge, Anders Bagge and Andreas Carlsson. She later sang songs like ABBA's "Mamma Mia", Py Bäckman's "Stad i ljus", "Save Up All Your Tears", "Bleeding Love" by Leona Lewis, "The Best" and "Over the Rainbow".

Bergendahl finished fifth in the Idol season which was later won by Kevin Borg.

In 2009, Bergendahl was approached by Kristian Lagerström and Bobby Ljunggren and asked if she wanted to record a song for Melodifestivalen 2010.

=== Melodifestivalen and Eurovision 2010 ===
Anna Bergendahl participated in Melodifestivalen 2010 with the song "This Is My Life", written and produced by Kristian Lagerström (lyrics) and Bobby Ljunggren (music). The song won the final in Ericsson Globe on 13 March 2010, with 214 points. Bergendahl represented Sweden at the Eurovision Song Contest 2010 in Oslo, Norway, where she became the first Swedish singer not to qualify for the final since the introduction of the semifinals in 2004 (although she placed 11th, just outside the top 10 qualifiers by a margin of 5 points). "This Is My Life'" was the first ballad to win Melodifestivalen since 1998 when Kärleken är won and was also Sweden's 50th entry in the Eurovision Song Contest.

=== 2010–present: Return to Melodifestivalen and other projects ===
After Eurovision, Bergendahl participated in Allsång på Skansen, Sommarkrysset, and Lotta på Liseberg. She also went on a tour and sang songs from her debut album. In 2012 Bergendahl released her new album Something to Believe In with the debut single from the new album being "Live and Let Go". In 2019, she released two new singles, "Home" and "Speak Love". She participated in Melodifestivalen 2019 with the song "Ashes to Ashes". Bergendahl competed in Melodifestivalen 2020 with the song "Kingdom Come". She placed third, scoring 107 points. The song became the second most played song on Swedish airplay and also sold platinum. During late 2020, Bergendahl released "Thelma and Louise". The EP Vera was released in October 2020 and contains five songs written by Bergendahl. By the end of the year, she also released her Christmas song, "It Never Snows in California". On 13 August 2021, Bergendahl released "Grain of Trust", written together with Peter Kvint.

Bergendahl returned to Melodifestivalen again in 2022 with the song "Higher Power". She made it to the final on 12 March 2022 and finished in last place with 29 points.

== Discography ==
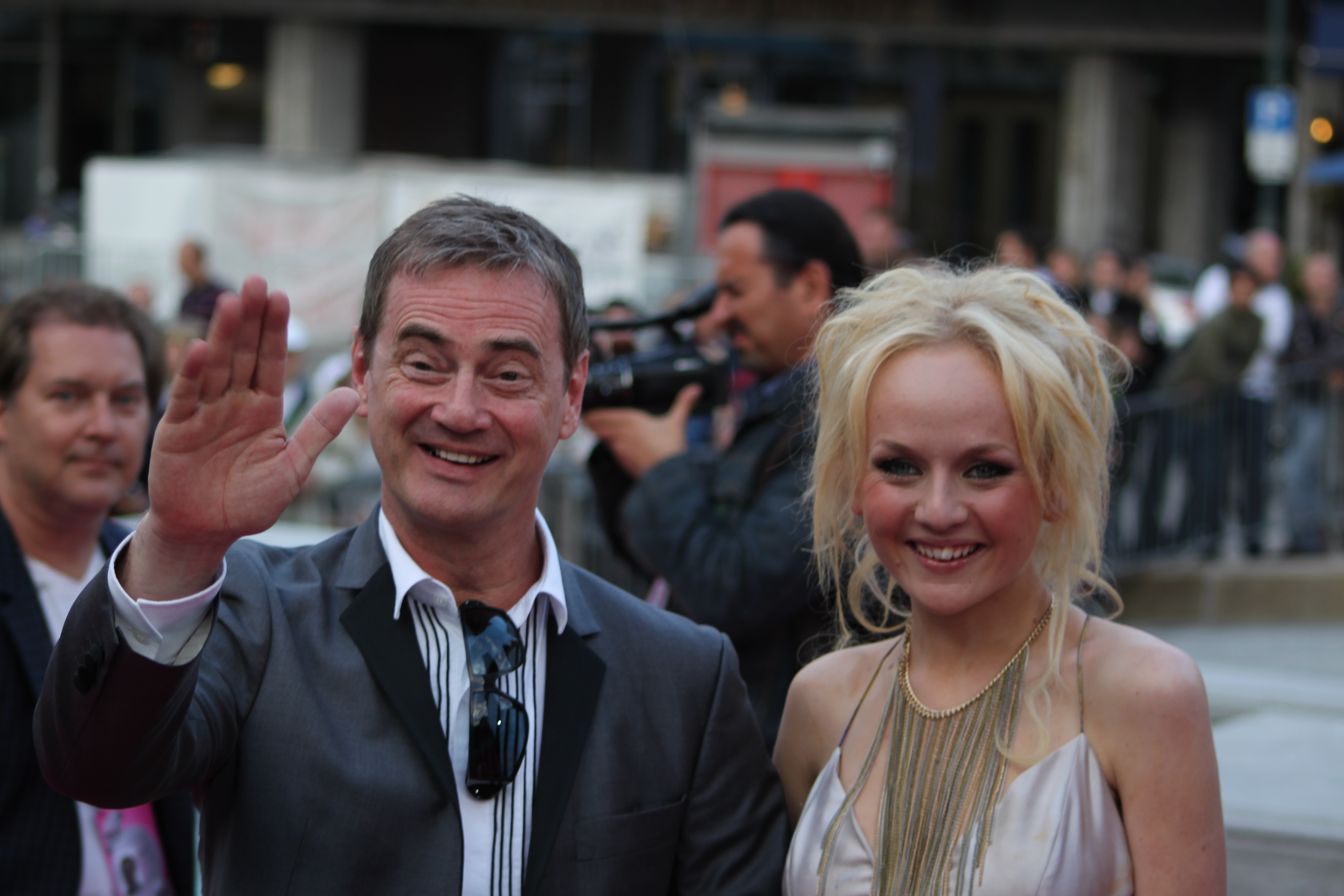
Christer Björkman and Anna Bergendahl in Oslo on 23 May 2010

=== Studio albums ===
Title	Details	Peak chart positions	Certifications
Title	Details	SWE	Certifications
Yours Sincerely	Released: 14 April 2010; Label: Universal Music Group; Format: CD, digital download	1	GLF: Gold
Something to Believe In	Released: 24 October 2012; Label: Lionheart Records; Format: CD, digital download	13	

=== Extended plays ===
Title	Details
Anna Bergendahl	Released: 23 September 2012; Label: Lionheart; Format: CD, digital download
Live from Sandkvie Studio	Released: 23 October 2015; Label: Lionheart; Format: Digital download
We Were Never Meant to Be Heroes	Released: 17 May 2018; Label: Freebird Entertainment; Format: Digital download
Vera	Released: 9 October 2020; Label: Freebird Entertainment; Format: Digital download
Merry Christmas Everyone	Released: 18 November 2022; Label: Freebird Entertainment, Warner Sweden; Format: Digital download, streaming

=== Singles ===
As lead artist

Title	Year	Peak chart positions				Certifications	Album
Title	Year	SWE	NOR	NLD	SWI	Certifications	Album
"Release Me" (Live)	2008	58	—	—	—		Idol 2008
"Save Up All Your Tears"	2008	57	—	—	—		Idol 2008
"Bleeding Love"	2008	60	—	—	—		Idol 2008
"Over the Rainbow"	2008	53	—	—	—		Idol 2008
"This Is My Life"	2010	1	6	93	62	GLF: Platinum	Yours Sincerely
"The Army"	2010	—	—	—	—		Yours Sincerely
"Live and Let Go"	2012	—	—	—	—		Something to Believe In
"I Hate New York"	2013	—	—	—	—		Something to Believe In
"Business"	2015	—	—	—	—		Non-album singles
"For You"	2015	—	—	—	—		Non-album singles
"Vice"	2018	—	—	—	—		We Were Never Meant to Be Heroes
"Broken Melody"	2018	—	—	—	—		We Were Never Meant to Be Heroes
"We Were Never Meant to Be Heroes"	2018	—	—	—	—		We Were Never Meant to Be Heroes
"Raise the Vibe"	2018	—	—	—	—		Non-album single
"Just Another Christmas"	2018	—	—	—	—		Merry Christmas Everyone
"Ashes to Ashes"	2019	12	—	—	—	GLF: Platinum	Non-album singles
"Home"	2019	—	—	—	—		Non-album singles
"Speak Love"	2019	—	—	—	—		Non-album singles
"Kingdom Come"	2020	9	—	—	—	GLF: Platinum	Non-album singles
"Thelma and Louise"	2020	13	—	—	—		Vera
"It Never Snows in California"	2020	—	—	—	—		Merry Christmas Everyone
"Grain of Trust"	2021	30	—	—	—		Non-album singles
"Bottom of This Bottle" (with Tyler Rich)	2021	—	—	—	—		Non-album singles
"Higher Power"	2022	17	—	—	—		Non-album singles
"Demons and Dreams"	2022	—	—	—	—		Non-album singles
"Merry Christmas Everyone"	2022	100	—	—	—		Merry Christmas Everyone
"Dance with Me"	2023	—	—	—	—		TBA
"—" denotes releases that did not chart or were not released to that country.

As featured artist

Title	Year	Chart Positions	Album
Title	Year	NOR	Album
"For You" (Broiler featuring Anna Bergendahl)	2014	21	Non-album single

=== Other charted songs ===
Title	Year	Chart Positions	Album
Title	Year	SWE	Album
"(I've Had) The Time of My Life" (with Kevin Borg)	2008	36	Non-album single

Preceded by Malena Ernman with "La voix"	Sweden in the Eurovision Song Contest; 2010	Succeeded by Eric Saade with "Popular"
