= Kingdom Come (Anna Bergendahl song) =

Single by Anna Bergendahl
- Released: 22 February 2020
- Length: 3:00
- Label: Freebird; Warner Music Sweden
- Songwriters: Bobby Ljunggren; Thomas G:son; Erik Bernholm; Anna Bergendahl
- Producer: Erik Bernholm

Anna Bergendahl singles chronology
"Speak Love" (2019)	"Kingdom Come" (2020)	"Thelma and Louise" (2020)

"Kingdom Come" is a song performed by Swedish singer Anna Bergendahl. The song was performed for the first time by her in Melodifestivalen 2020, where it made it to the final. Bergendahl finished in third place with the song, scoring 107 points. Subsequently, the song peaked at number 9 on the Swedish single chart.

At Melodifestivalen, Anna Bergendahl performed the song with dancers on the stage. On 28 March 2020, Anna Bergendahl performed a softer variation of the song in TV 4's Nyhetsmorgon, accompanied by the acoustic guitar.

== Charts ==
Chart (2020)	Peak position
Sweden (Sverigetopplistan)	9
