= Mikael Samuelson =

Swedish opera singer

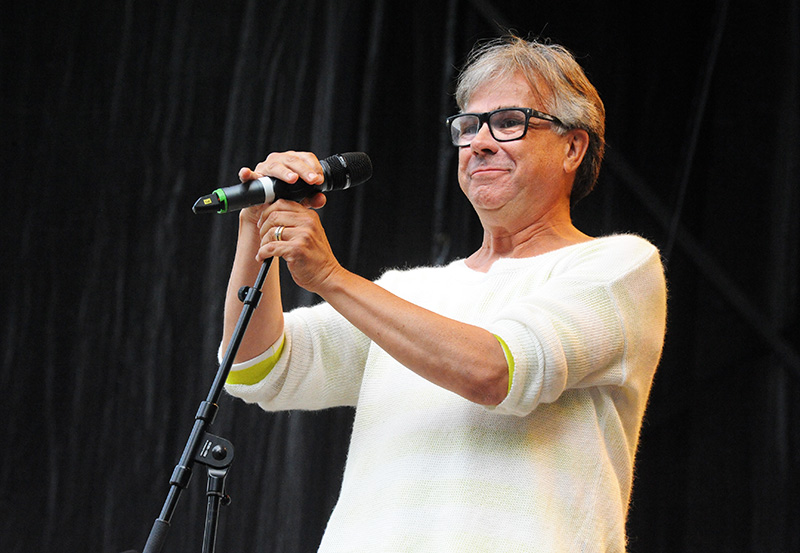
Mikael Samuelson in 2014

Mikael Gustaf Lennart Samuelson (born 9 March 1951) is a Swedish baritone opera singer, actor, and composer.

== Early life ==
Samuelson was born in Njutånger in Hälsingland, central Sweden. He is the son of the musician and music arranger Bror Samuelson.

Samuelson studied singing, conducting, and violin at Musikhögskolan in the 1970s, and he is a well-known face in the Swedish musical and theatre industry.

During his youth, he performed at Norrlandsoperan and sang the parts of Papageno in The Magic Flute and the title role in The Marriage of Figaro, among others. In the 1980s, he moved to the Royal Swedish Opera and Drottningholms slottsteater in Stockholm, singing the parts of Escamillo in Carmen and Tevje in Fiddler on the Roof.

== Career ==
=== Major roles ===
His breakthrough was playing the part of the Phantom in the Swedish version of Andrew Lloyd Webber's The Phantom of the Opera, from 1989 to 1995. Samuelson sang and portrayed the character for over 2000 performances and received the honourable Swedish theatre Award "Guldmasken" in 1991.

In the early 1990s, he was also known for his role as one of the main characters in the Swedish TV series Rederiet ("High Seas"), a long-running drama show about a shipping company, which conducts passenger traffic on the Baltic Sea between Stockholm and Turku in Finland. Samuelson played the ship's captain-later-turned C.E.O. Rolf Dahlén, son of the ship's owner, between 1992 and 1994. He left the show in the end of the fifth season, his character being killed off in a car crash.

In the late 1990s, he had major roles in musicals like Cyrano de Bergerac, Cabaret and The Showboat for which he earned prize nominations and good critical receptions. From December 1999 to March 2000, Samuelson sang and performed popular songs and poems written by Lars Forssell, together with the two vocalists Barbro "Lill-Babs" Svensson and Evabritt Strandberg in a show called "Showtime - A Tribute to Lars Forssell".

In 2006, he played Herr Eriksson in the film En liten tiger, and opposite Lena Strömdahl, who had portrayed his wife Yvonne in Rederiet.

In 2007, Samuelson showed his comedic side playing the role as Magnus in the Swedish comedy film Min frus förste älskare ("My Wife's First Lover"), for which he became well known.

During the spring of 2008, he played the lead role in the Swedish version of Jekyll & Hyde. The musical ended on December 30, 2009.

Samuelson starred in The Göteborg Opera's production of the musical La Cage aux Folles in its run from September 7, 2013, to March 9, 2014.

In 2016, Paradox Interactive released a musical content pack for their simulation video game Europa Universalis IV which featured Samuelson's performances titled Europa Universalis IV: Fredman's Epistles.

In his film career, Samuelson is best known for his role as the Investigator in Håkan Alexandersson's 1987 thriller movie Res aldrig på enkel biljett ("Never travel on a one-way ticket"). His character searches for the truth in the world, about love, sex, madness and cruelty. His other films include Min frus förste älskare (2006), En liten Tiger, (2006), Aladdin (1992), Kronbruden (1990), Spårvagn till havet (1987), and Kärleken är allt (1986).

In his theatre career, he has played the policeman Rapp in Vilhelm Moberg's comedy Marknadsafton and other plays.

== Records ==
In 1988, he released the album Music of Carl Michael Bellman with recordings of 10 of Fredman's epistles and 3 of Fredman's songs. In 1990, he won the City of Stockholm's Bellman Prize for his interpretations of Sweden's national bard.

In 1996, he released the record "Midvinter" where he sang well-known Christmas songs in his own style, accompanied by cellist Svante Henryson and pianist Lennart Simonsson.

== Awards ==
In 1990 he won a Guldmasken Award for Best Leading Actor in Phantom of the Opera.

In 1993, he won the Fred Åkerström prize for his music with guitarist Mats Bergström.
