= Scenes from the Heart =

2018 autobiographic book by Malena Ernman and Svante Thunberg

- Cover of "Scener ur hjärtat"
- Authors: Malena Ernman, Greta Thunberg, Svante Thunberg, Beata Ernman
- Original title: Scener ur hjärtat
- Translator: Paul Norlen and Saskia Vogel
- Language: Swedish
- Genre: Autobiography
- Published: 23 August 2018 (first edition)
- Publisher: Bokförlaget Polaris
- Publication place: Sweden
- Followed by: No One Is Too Small to Make a Difference

Scenes from the Heart (Swedish: Scener ur hjärtat) is a 2018 book by Swedish opera singer Malena Ernman, her husband Svante Thunberg, and their daughters, climate activist Greta Thunberg and Beata Ernman. It consists of three main chapters, divided into several subchapters, and opens with the poem "Elegi" from the poetry collection Ty by Werner Aspenström. The book is written as an autobiography.

The reader follows Malena Ernman and her family as they tour Europe for Ernman's singing career. The book details elder daughter Greta's background and family life before she started her school strike climate campaign, as well as her diagnosis of Asperger's syndrome. It also addresses Greta's younger sister Beata's attention deficit hyperactivity disorder (ADHD), and the family's struggle to deal with their daughters' diagnoses. In the book, the girls' mother concludes that Asperger's and ADHD are "not a handicap" so much as a "superpower."

The book has been translated into German. In the original Swedish edition, only Malena Ernman and Svante Thunberg are credited as authors. Greta has been given top credit in new editions, and her photo is on the cover of the German edition. The book was translated into English by Paul Norlen and Saskia Vogel and an updated version with contributions from the girls, and the whole family credited as authors, was published under the title Our House Is on Fire: Scenes of a Family and a Planet in Crisis by Penguin Books on 5 March 2020.

== Contents ==
- Chapter 1: Behind the Curtain
- Chapter 2: Burned-Out Humans on a Burned-Out Planet
- Chapter 3: Imagine if Life Is Real and Everything We Do Means Something

== See also ==
- No One is Too Small to Make a Difference, a collection of Greta Thunberg's speeches.
