= Mats Bergström =

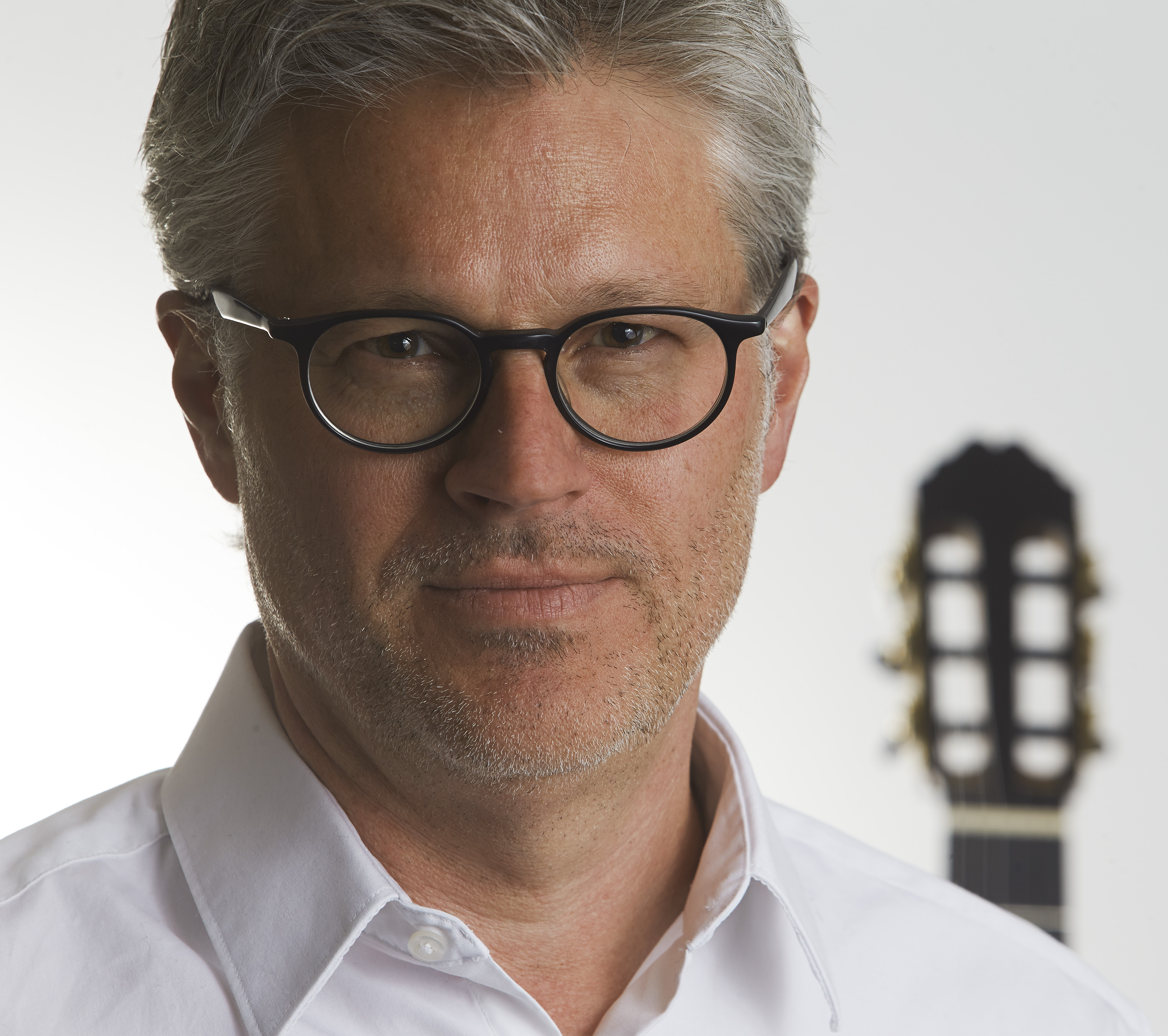

Background information
- Born: Mats Johan Bergström; 7 March 1961 (age 64); Gävle, Sweden
- Genres: Chamber music
- Occupations: Musician, composer
- Instrument: guitar
- Years active: 1983–present
- Labels: Naxos
- Website: www.matsbergstrom.com

Mats Johan Bergström (7 March 1961) is a Swedish guitarist and composer principally focused in the genre of chamber music.

Borne in Gävle, Sweden, he received his MFA from the Royal College of Music, Stockholm in 1982, and did post-graduate study at the Juilliard School, 1990–92. He made his debut in 1983 at Wigmore Hall in London and has since been a freelance soloist, accompanist and ensemble musician.

Bergström has collaborated with such artists as Mikael Samuelson, Steve Reich, Edda Magnason, Göran Söllscher, and Malena Ernman, among others. He played acoustic guitar on the Douce France album of Swedish mezzo-soprano Anne Sofie von Otter, which won the 2015 Grammy Award for Best Classical Solo Vocal Album.

== Recognition ==
- 1993 – Fred Åkerström grant (with Mikael Samuelson)
- 2006 – Member of the Royal Swedish Academy of Music
- 2011 – Litteris et Artibus
