= Svante Thunberg =

Swedish actor (born 1969)

- Born: Svante Fritz Vilhelm Thunberg; 10 June 1969 (age 57); Stockholm, Sweden
- Occupations: Actor; manager; producer
- Spouse: Malena Ernman (m. 2004)
- Children: 2, including Greta Thunberg
- Father: Olof Thunberg

Svante Fritz Vilhelm Ernman Thunberg (born 10 June 1969) is a Swedish actor and producer. He is the father of activist Greta Thunberg.

== Life and career ==
Svante Fritz Vilhelm Thunberg was born on 10 June 1969 in Stockholm, Sweden, the son of actor Olof Thunberg and actress Mona Andersson. Thunberg is named after an ancestral cousin, Svante Arrhenius, who won the Nobel Prize for Chemistry in 1903.

Before taking a course in drama studies at the University of Gothenburg, Thunberg appeared with his father in a production of A Midsummer Night's Dream.

As a young man, Thunberg acted with the company of the Royal Dramatic Theatre and the National Swedish Touring Theatre. In 1998, he appeared in the Sveriges Television drama series Skärgårdsdoktorn. After that, he mostly had small parts in stage productions.

In the spring of 2002, Thunberg was playing the part of Joseph Martin Kraus in a television documentary about Kraus, with the opera singer Malena Ernman also in the cast of the production. She fell in love with Thunberg and invited him on a first date, to see the film Amélie. Two months after their first meeting Ernman was pregnant; she was delighted when she told Thunberg the news and found he wanted the child. During the pregnancy, Thunberg was working in Sweden at the Östgöta Theatre, the Orion Theatre, and the National Swedish Touring Theatre.

Thunberg's first daughter, Greta, was born on 3 January 2003, and her parents married in July 2004. They had a second daughter, Beata, on 3 November 2005. Ernman's career was just taking off in 2003, and Thunberg stayed at home to look after their daughters, selling his Porsche. Ernman was increasingly in demand for overseas appearances, and the whole family would travel to these together. Ernman did not drive, while Thunberg could provide transport when needed. He also acted as manager for his wife's singing career.

In 2020, Thunberg was credited as lyricist on an album by the singing group Ex Animo.

== Climate ==
Thunberg did not initially support his daughter's school strike for the climate, which began in August 2018. He believed that she should attend school and not miss classes. His message to her was "If you are going to do this, you are going to do it by yourself."

In September 2018 Thunberg said "Greta forced us to change our lives, I didn’t have a clue about the climate. We started looking into it, reading all the books." In December, he told a conference in Katowice that he and his wife had given up flying.

Due to Greta's status as a minor, once her School Strike for Climate activism went viral, Thunberg became closely involved in her climate campaign as both guardian and chaperone until she became old enough to travel without supervision (which is documented in the Hulu film I am Greta). In July 2019, Thunberg accompanied Greta on her transatlantic crossings on the sailing vessels Malizia II and La Vagabond to visit North America en route to COP25 (see Transatlantic Voyages of Greta Thunberg).

In a 2019 interview with BBC Radio, Thunberg spoke of the years of depression Greta had suffered (which had been triggered by her sense of hopelessness after learning about climate change) and his worries about her. He added "I did all these things, I knew they were the right thing to do... but I didn't do it to save the climate, I did it to save my child."

Thunberg and his wife, Malena Ernman, coauthored the memoir Scenes from the Heart (2018), which tells the story of the Thunberg family in the years before Greta was known as an international activist. It centered on the family's struggles addressing Greta's depression and obtaining the services and help she required. An updated edition of Scenes from the Heart was republished in 2020 under the title Our House Is on Fire: Scenes of a Family and a Planet in Crisis (2020). The updated version includes the Thunberg family's views on the challenges surrounding the Earth's climate crisis. The new title lists Greta, Svante, Malena, and the family's youngest child Beata as authors, respectively.
