= Beata MonaLisa =

Swedish singer and actress

Beata Mona Lisa Ernman Andersson (born 3 November 2005), known professionally as Beata MonaLisa or BEA, is a Swedish singer and stage actress.

== Career ==
Beata's sound has been described as having indie pop and jazz influences.

In April 2019, she released the song "Bara du Vill". She performed the song on Malou efter tio on TV4.

She shared the lead role in the musical Forever Piaf with her mother at Göta Lejon, where she portrayed a young Edith Piaf. Originally scheduled to premiere in 2020, the COVID-19 pandemic pushed the premiere back to 2021.

In 2024, she released her debut single, "I Found Your Father’s Gun." Since she was 13, she has been working on a full album which she plans to release in 2026.

Beata has said that her songwriting and performance style is informed by feminism and critique of patriarchy.

== Personal life ==
She is the younger sister of environmental activist Greta Thunberg and the daughter of actor Svante Thunberg and opera singer Malena Ernman. Her middle name and artist name, MonaLisa, comes from the names of her grandmother and great-grandmother. She is the co-author of the 2018 autobiographic book Scener ur hjärtat (Scenes from the Heart). In the book, her mother wrote that Beata was diagnosed with ADHD, Asperger syndrome, OCD, and oppositional defiant syndrome. Beata experienced bullying at school, and later from the media as her sister, Greta, gained media attention.

She attended a classical music school.

She is based in Stockholm. In a 2026 interview, she clarified that although her music has a "queer aesthetic" and she has a queer fanbase, she is not queer.
