= La Voix (song) =

2009 song by Malena Ernman

"La voix"

Single by Malena Ernman

from the album La Voix du Nord
- Released: 23 February 2009
- Recorded: 2008
- Genre: Europop; Dance; Operatic pop
- Label: Roxy
- Songwriters: Fredrik Kempe; Malena Ernman
- Producers: Elof Loelv; Kim Wennerström

Contest video
- "La voix" by Malena Ernman on YouTube

Eurovision Song Contest 2009 entry
- Country: Sweden
- Artist: Malena Ernman
- Languages: English, French
- Composer: Fredrik Kempe
- Lyricists: Fredrik Kempe; Malena Ernman

Finals performance
- Semi-final result: 4th
- Semi-final points: 105
- Final result: 21st
- Final points: 33

Entry chronology
- ◄ "Hero" (2008)
- "This Is My Life" (2010) ►

"La voix" (French pronunciation: [la vwa]; "The voice") is a song by Swedish singer Malena Ernman, composed by Fredrik Kempe, and with lyrics by both Kempe and Ernman. It represented Sweden in the Eurovision Song Contest 2009 after winning Melodifestivalen 2009. It is the first Swedish entry to contain lyrics in French, as well as being the last Swedish entry to have contained lyrics in a language other than English before KAJ's 2025 entry Bara bada bastu. Despite the fact that France's Patricia Kaas would get a relatively good placing in the final, Ernman drew further attention to Francophone culture in the semi-final, as well in the grand final (by classing 3rd in the OGAE Second Chance round), despite her ultimate placing (21st).

The song was the winner of Melodifestivalen 2009 on 14 March 2009, earning the right to compete for Sweden in the first semi-final of Eurovision 2009 on 12 May 2009. The song qualified for the final round where it finished 21st place with 33 points, making it Sweden's second lowest placing in the contest since 1992's "I morgon är en annan dag" (22nd), and also the second time the country failed to place within the Top 20.

In 2010, the song was covered by Russian pop singer Philipp Kirkorov and opera singer Anna Netrebko with Kirkorov singing verses and Netrebko singing chorus. They recorded two versions of the song, one with original French and English lyrics and other sang exclusively in Russian.

The song has also been used as the backing track for the musical documentary Spaceplane Sailing. The short film covers the 33-mission career of the Space Shuttle Atlantis and was premiered on YouTube in February 2013.

== Melodifestivalen ==
"La voix" participated in the fourth heat of the 2009 Melodifestivalen which was held on 28 February 2009 at the Malmö Arena in Malmö. The song was the last of the eight competing entries to perform and directly qualified to the contest final as one of the two songs which received the most telephone votes. On 14 March, during the final held at the Globe Arena in Stockholm, Ernman were the last of the eleven competing acts to perform, and "La voix" won the contest with 182 points, receiving the highest number of votes from the viewing public via telephone voting despite placing only eighth with the regional and international juries.

== Eurovision ==
Sweden participated in the first semi-final of the 2009 Eurovision Song Contest in Moscow, Russia on 12 May 2009. Ernman was the fifth competing artist to perform and Sweden was subsequently announced at the end of the broadcast as one of the ten countries to have qualified for the final. Ernman performed again in the final on 16 May, with Sweden drawn to perform as the fourth country on stage, and subsequently finished in twenty-first place with a total of 33 points. The full breakdown of results published after the final revealed that in the first semi-final Sweden had finished in fourth place with 105 points.

== Chart performance ==
The song debuted on the Swedish Singles Chart on the week of 13 March 2009 at number 31, before climbing to number 10 the following week and then number four in its third.

On 26 April 2009, "La voix" went straight to number one on the Svensktoppen radio chart.

In May 2009, the single entered at 29 in the Belgium Ultratip, moved up to 27 in its second week and then fell off the chart.

== Track listing ==
- CD: (Sweden)
1. "La voix" (radio edit)
2. "La voix" (karaoke)

== Charts ==
=== Weekly charts ===
Chart (2009)	Peak position
Belgium (Ultratip Bubbling Under Flanders)	27
Finland Download (Suomen virallinen lista)	19
Norway (VG-lista)	20
Sweden (Sverigetopplistan)	2
UK Singles (OCC)	138

=== Year-end charts ===
Chart (2009)	Position
Sweden (Sverigetopplistan)	14
