= Tim Krohn =

Swiss writer

Tim Krohn (born 9 February 1965) is an author of Swiss literature, recipient of the 1994 Conrad-Ferdinand-Meyer-Preis.

Born in Wiedenbrück, North Rhine-Westphalia, Krohn grew up in Glarus. He interrupted his studies of German language, Philosophy and Politology in 1992 and has been working as a freelance author based in Zürich.

== Selected works ==
- 1990, Fäustchen
- 1992, Surfer / Zeitalter des Esels
- 1994, Der Schwan in Stücken
- 1996, Die kleine Oper vom Herbstmondfächer
- 1997, Dreigroschenkabinett
- 1998, Quatemberkinder
- 2000, Irinas Buch der leichtfertigen Liebe
- 2002, Bienen, Königinnen, Schwäne in Stücken
- 2002, Die Erfindung der Welt, with Elisa Ortega
- 2005, Heimweh
- 2007, Vrenelis Gärtli
- 2008, Warum die Erde Rund ist
- 2008, Schneewittchen
- 2009, Platons Höhle
- 2009, Ans Meer
- 2010, Der Geist am Berg
- 2014, Aus dem Leben einer Matratze bester Machart
- 2015, Nachts in Vals
- 2017, Herr Brechbühl sucht eine Katze
- 2017, Erich Wyss übt den freien Fall
- 2018, Julia Sommer sät aus
- 2020, Die heilige Henni der Hinterhöfe
- 2022, Pippin der Nichtsnutz

== See also ==
- Alemannic literature
