= La Voix du Nord (album) =

Studio album by Malena Ernman
- Released: 1 July 2009 (Sweden)
- Recorded: 2009
- Genre: Classical; pop; opera
- Length: 01 hour 25 minutes
- Label: Roxy Recordings

Malena Ernman chronology
My Love (2003)	La Voix du Nord (2009)	Santa Lucia – En Klassisk Jul (2010)

Singles from La Voix du Nord
- 1. "La Voix" Released: 2009; 2. "Min plats på jorden" Released: 2009

La Voix du Nord (French pronunciation: [la vwa dy nɔʁ]; "The Voice of the North") is a double disc album by Malena Ernman, who represented Sweden in Eurovision Song Contest 2009. The first CD contains 11 pop songs including "La Voix", which was Ernman's entry at the Eurovision Song Contest, and the second CD contains 11 arias. The album was released on July 1, 2009 in Sweden. It debuted at #1 on the official album chart and was certified Gold in its first week and eventually was certified Platinum in September 2009.

== Track listing ==
=== Disc One ===
1. "One Step From Paradise" – F. Kempe/A. Hansson/S. Vaughn
2. "La Voix" – F. Kempe/A. Hansson/S. Vaughn
3. "Min plats på jorden" – F. Kempe/A. Hansson/P. Bäckman
4. "Sempre libera" – F. Kempe/A. Hansson
5. "What Becomes Of Love" – F. Kempe/A. Hansson/S. Vaughn
6. "Un bel dì" – F. Kempe/G. Puccini
7. "Breathless Days" – F. Kempe/A. Hansson/S. Vaughn
8. "Perdus" – F. Kempe/A. Hansson/C. Måhlén
9. "Tragedy" – F. Kempe/A. Hansson/A. Bard
10. "All The Lost Tomorrows" – F. Kempe/A. Hansson/S. Vaughn
11. "La Voix (acoustic)" – F. Kempe/M. Ernman

=== Disc Two ===
1. "Quando me'n vo" – Giacomo Puccini
2. "Voi che sapete" – Wolfgang Amadeus Mozart
3. "Solveig's Song" – Edvard Grieg
4. "O mio babbino caro" – Giacomo Puccini
5. "Vedrai carino" – Wolfgang Amadeus Mozart
6. "Una voce poco fa" – Gioachino Rossini
7. "Lascia ch'io pianga" – George Frideric Handel
8. "Caro mio ben" – Giuseppe Giordani
9. "Non più mesta" – Gioachino Rossini
10. "Ombra mai fu" – George Frideric Handel
11. "Dido's Lament" – Henry Purcell

== Chart positions ==
=== Weekly charts ===
Chart (2009–2010)	Peak position
Swedish Albums (Sverigetopplistan)	1

=== Year-end charts ===
Chart (2009)	Position
Swedish Albums (Sverigetopplistan)	8
