= Så mörk är natten i midvintertid =

Song
- Language: Swedish
- Published: 1969
- Genre: Christmas
- Songwriter: Carl Bertil Agnestig
- Composer: Johny Johansson

"Så mörk är natten i midvintertid" is a Saint Lucy song, originally entitled Lucia, with lyrics by Johny Johansson and music by Carl Bertil Agnestig. The song was originally published in 1969, and has become a popular Saint Lucy song throughout Sweden.

== Publication ==
- Julens önskesångbok, 1997, under the lines "Advent".

== Recordings ==
An early recording was done by Söderbärke ungdomskör on the 1976 album Luciamorgon på Carl Larsson-gården.
