= This Is My Life (Anna Bergendahl song) =

2010 song by Anna Bergendahl

- Single cover

Single by Anna Bergendahl

from the album Yours Sincerely
- Released: February 2010
- Recorded: 2010
- Genre: Pop
- Length: 3:01
- Label: Lionheart International
- Songwriters: Kristian Lagerström; Bobby Ljunggren
- Producer: Dan Sundquist

Anna Bergendahl singles chronology
"Over the Rainbow" (2008)	"This Is My Life" (2010)	"The Army" (2010)

Eurovision Song Contest 2010 entry
- Country: Sweden
- Artist: Anna Bergendahl
- Language: English
- Composer: Bobby Ljunggren
- Lyricist: Kristian Lagerström

Finals performance
- Semi-final result: 11th
- Semi-final points: 62

Entry chronology
- ◄ "La voix" (2009)
- "Popular" (2011) ►

"This Is My Life" is an English language song by Swedish singer Anna Bergendahl, written by Kristian Lagerström and Bobby Ljunggren. The song won the Melodifestivalen 2010 on March 13 and represented Sweden in the Eurovision Song Contest 2010. It is the first single released from her debut studio album Yours Sincerely.

"This Is My Life" was her first number-one single on the Swedish Singles Chart. It debuted at #1 on the Swedish chart for the week ending 5 March 2010 and stayed on top for four consecutive weeks.

This is My Life was the first ballad to win Melodifestivalen since 1998 when Kärleken är won and was Sweden's 50th entry in the Eurovision Song Contest. The song did not make it to the final coming 11th with 62 points missing out by just 5 points. This was the first and only time Sweden has not qualified for the Eurovision finals and the first time it has not appeared in them since 1976.

== Melodifestivalen ==
"This Is My Life" participated in the fourth heat of the 2010 Melodifestivalen which was held on 27 February 2010 at the Malmö Arena in Malmö. The song was the fifth of the eight competing entries to perform and directly qualified to the contest final as one of the two songs which received the most telephone votes. On 13 March, during the final held at the Globe Arena in Stockholm, Bergendahl were the ninth of the ten competing acts to perform, and "This Is My Life" won the contest with 214 points, receiving the highest number of votes from the viewing public via telephone voting and placing second with the regional and international juries.

== Eurovision ==
Sweden participated in the first semi-final of the 2010 Eurovision Song Contest in Oslo, Norway on 27 May 2010. Bergendahl was the sixth competing artist to perform and at the end of the broadcast Sweden was not among the ten countries to have qualified for the final on 29 May. It was the first time that Sweden had failed to qualify for the final since the introduction of semi-finals in 2004, and the first time that Sweden did not appear in a contest final since 1976. It was later revealed that Sweden had placed eleventh in the semi-final, receiving a total of 62 points, including the maximum 12 points from Denmark and Norway, and missing the final by just 5 points. Following the announcement of the split jury and televoting results in June 2010, it was revealed that "This Is My Life" had been ranked ninth by the public and eleventh by the juries.

== Track listing ==
Digital download
No.	Title	Length
1.	"This Is My Life"	3:00

== Charts ==
Chart (2010)	Peak position
Netherlands (Single Top 100)	93
Hungary (Rádiós Top 40)	40
Norway (VG-lista)	6
Sweden (Sverigetopplistan)	1
Switzerland (Schweizer Hitparade)	62

== Release history ==
Country	Date	Format	Label
Sweden	28 February 2010	Digital download	Lionheart International
