= Yours Sincerely (Anna Bergendahl album) =

Studio album by Anna Bergendahl
- Released: 14 April 2010
- Recorded: 2010
- Genre: Folk
- Label: Lionheart International; Universal Music Group
- Producer: Mohammad Denebi, Dan Sundquist, Maria Molin Ljunggren (exec.)

Anna Bergendahl chronology
| Yours Sincerely (2010) | Anna Bergendahl (2012) |

Singles from Yours Sincerely
- 1. "This Is My Life" Released: March 3, 2010; 2. "The Army" Released: August 31, 2010

Yours Sincerely is the debut studio album by Anna Bergendahl. It was released on 14 April 2010 and reached the top of the Swedish Albums Chart on 23 April 2010.

== Singles ==
The lead single from the album,"This is My Life", was released on 28 February 2010. Anna Bergendahl performed the song in the Eurovision Song Contest 2010 representing Sweden, she failed to qualify for the final scored 62 points and finished 11th. "The Army" was released as the second single from the album on 31 August 2010.

== Critical reception ==
Jon O'Brien from AllMusic rated the album 4.5 stars out of 5 and wrote, "Her uptempo tracks, then, are infinitely far more appealing than her slower numbers, but she possesses the kind of voice that's just aching for a heartfelt love song that would make her Eurovision disaster a distant memory. With Yours Sincerely, Bergendahl doesn't score on that front, but there's enough potential here to suggest that in the future she will."

== Track listing ==
All tracks are produced by Dan Sundquist, except where noted.

| No. | Title | Writer(s) | Producer(s) | Length |
|---|---|---|---|---|
| 1. | "Rolling Dice" | Anna Bergendahl; Dan Sundquist; Daniel Z Borch | | 3:00 |
| 2. | "This Is My Life" | Bobby Ljunggren; Kristian Lagerström | | 3:01 |
| 3. | "Barcelona Blues" | Bergendahl | | 2:53 |
| 4. | "The Army" | Ljunggren; Lagerström | | 3:28 |
| 5. | "Yeah Yeah Yeah" | Bergendahl; Sundquist; Borch | | 3:51 |
| 6. | "My Love" | Borch; Mohammad Denebi | Sundquist; Denebi | 3:57 |
| 7. | "Beautiful" | Borch | | 4:14 |
| 8. | "Bye Bye Darling" | Bergendahl; Björn Djupström; Borch; Denebi | | 3:28 |
| 9. | "Got My Heart in Your Pocket" | Johan Lyander; Lagerström | | 3:15 |
| 10. | "Have a Heart" | Bonnie Hayes | | 4:14 |
| 11. | "You Make Me Happy" (featuring Brandur Enni) | Ljunggren; Lagerström | | 3:55 |
| 12. | "Melodramatic Mess" | Bergendahl | | 4:10 |

== Credits ==
All credits adapted from AllMusic.

=== Personnel ===
Vocal credits

- Anna Bergendahl - lead vocals
- Sara Borch - background vocals
- Emma-Lisa Norrhamn - background vocals
- Dan Sundquist - background vocals

Managerial and creative credits

- Magdalena Erixon - hair stylist, make-up
- Fredrik Järnberg - coordination
- Maria Molin Ljunggren - executive producer

Technical credits

- Erik Arvinder - string arrangements, strings, violin
- Daniel Blendulf - cello
- Josef Cabrales-Alin - violin
- Mohammad Denebi - composer, dobro, guitar, producer, soloist, vocal recording
- Björn Djupström - composer
- Kristina Ebbersten - violin
- Björn Engelmann - mastering
- Brandur Enni - primary artist
- Jakob Erixson - guitar (electric)
- Andreas Forsman - violin
- Pär Grebacken - clarinet, reeds
- Pelle Hansen - cello
- Bonnie Hayes - composer
- Erik Holm - viola
- Gudmund Ingvall - cello
- Christer Jansson - drums
- Karl-Ola S. Kjellholm - guitar (acoustic)
- Julia-Maria Kretz - violin
- Kristian Lagerström - composer
- Anna Larsson - violin
- Erik Liljenberg - violin
- Conny Lindgren - violin
- Pår Lindqvist - viola
- Bobby Ljunggren - composer
- Tomas Lundström - cello
- Johan Lyander- composer
- Peter Lysell - double bass
- Ylva Magnusson - violin
- Mira Malik - violin
- Daniel Migdal - violin
- Erik Mjörnell - guitar
- Emma-Lisa Norrhamn - clapping
- Christopher Öhman - viola
- Danijel Petrovic - double bass
- Andrej Power - violin
- Riikka Repo - viola
- Aleksander Sätterström - violin
- Mikael Sjögren - viola
- Johanna Sjunnesson - cello
- Torun Saeter Stavseng - cello
- Martin Stensson - violin
- Dan Sundquist - arranger, bass, clapping, composer, engineer, guitar, instrumentation, keyboards, mandoline, producer, programming, soloist, string arrangements
- Jonatan Ljungh Sundquist - clapping
- Christian Svarfvar - violin
- Patrik Swedrup - violin
- Fredrik Syberg - violin
- Paul Waltman - violin

== Charts ==
=== Weekly charts ===
| Chart (2010) | Peak position |
|---|---|
| Swedish Albums (Sverigetopplistan) | 1 |

=== Year-end charts ===
| Chart (2010) | Position |
|---|---|
| Swedish Albums (Sverigetopplistan) | 63 |

== Certifications ==
| Region | Certification | Certified units/sales |
|---|---|---|
| Sweden (GLF) | Gold | 20,000^{‡} |
^{‡} Sales+streaming figures based on certification alone.

== Release history ==
| Country | Date | Format | Label |
|---|---|---|---|
| Sweden | 14 April 2010 | Digital download | Lionheart International |
