= Mariae Wiegenlied =

German Christmas song

- by Max Reger
- English: Mary's lullaby
- Opus: 76, No. 52
- Genre: Christmas carol
- Occasion: Christmas
- Text: by Martin Boelitz
- Language: German
- Published: 1912

Mariae Wiegenlied (Mary's lullaby) is a German Christmas song for solo voice and piano, with music by Max Reger and words by Martin Boelitz. It was originally published in 1912.
