= All Over the World (Ola song) =

Single by Ola

from the album Ola
- Released: December 2010
- Recorded: 2010
- Genre: Dance-pop; house
- Songwriter(s): Ola Svensson; Tony Nilsson; Gavin Jones

Ola singles chronology
"Overdrive" (2010)	"All Over the World" (2010)	"Riot" (2011)

"All Over the World" is a 2010 single by Swedish singer Ola, full name Ola Svensson and the third single from his 2010 self-titled album Ola after his two Swedish hits from the album: Unstoppable (The Return of Natalie)" and "Overdrive". The third release peaked at number three on the Swedish Singles Chart.

== Charts ==
Chart (2010)	Peak position
Sweden (Sverigetopplistan)	3
