= Don't Stop Movin' =

Don't Stop Movin' may refer to:

- "Don't Stop Movin'" (S Club 7 song)
  - Don't Stop Movin' (S Club album), a US-only album by S Club, named for the song
- "Don't Stop Movin'" (Livin' Joy song)
  - Don't Stop Movin' (Livin' Joy album)
