= Feelgood (song) =

2008 Ola song

Single by Ola Svensson

from the album Good Enough - The Feelgood Edition
- Released: May 2008
- Recorded: 2008
- Genre: Europop; disco
- Length: 3:31
- Label: MMS
- Songwriter(s): Tony Nilsson; Jonas Myrin

Ola Svensson singles chronology
"Love in Stereo" (2008)	"Feelgood" (2008)	"Sky's the Limit" (2009)

Feelgood is a Swedish English language hit by Ola Svensson in 2008 appearing on his album Good Enough - The Feelgood Edition

The song reached number two on the Swedish Singles Chart on the chart dated 4 September 2008. The single went on to sell in excess of 40,000 copies domestically, and was certified 2× platinum by IFPI.

== Charts ==
=== Weekly charts ===
Chart (2008)	Peak position
Sweden (Sverigetopplistan)	2

=== Year-end charts ===
Chart (2008)	Position
Sweden (Sverigetopplistan)	93
