= Given to Fly (disambiguation) =

"Given to Fly" is a song by Pearl Jam.

Given to Fly may also refer to:

- Given to Fly (album), by Ola 2006
- "Given to Fly", an episode of Crowded
- "Given to Fly", a Tharg's Future Shocks story by Simon Spurrier and Cam Smith
