= Natalie (Ola song) =

Single by Tony Nilsson
- Released: 2006
- Recorded: 2006
- Genre: Europop
- Songwriter(s): Tony Nilsson

"Natalie" is a Swedish English language song written by Tony Nilsson which he released in 2006 under the name Tony. It was also included in the compilation Absolute Summerhits 2006.

== Ola Svensson version ==
"Natalie"

Single by Ola

from the album Good Enough
- Released: 2007
- Recorded: 2007
- Genre: Europop
- Length: 3:08
- Label: MMS
- Songwriter(s): Tony Nilsson

Ola singles chronology
"Brothers" (2006)	"Natalie" (2007)	""Du Är Musiken I Mig (with Molly Sandén)"" (2007)

Ola Svensson released a hugely successful cover version under the name Ola. The song served as the lead single from his second album Good Enough and became a big summer hit in 2007, topping the Swedish Singles Chart for 6 weeks, namely charts dated 28 June and 5 July 2007 (first run), 26 July and 5 August 2007 (second run) and 16 and 23 August 2007 (third run). The single was certified platinum in Sweden, in recognition of 20,000 copies sold.

== Charts ==
Chart (2007)	Peak position
Sweden (Sverigetopplistan)	1

== See also ==
- "Unstoppable (The Return of Natalie)"
