= Follow the Rules (song) =

1996 single by Livin' Joy

Single by Livin' Joy

from the album Don't Stop Movin
- Released: 14 October 1996
- Genre: Dance-pop; house
- Length: 3:52
- Label: MCA
- Songwriters: Tameko Star; Gianni Visnadi; Paolo Visnadi
- Producers: Paolo Visnadi; Gianni Visnadi

Livin' Joy singles chronology
"Don't Stop Movin'" (1996)	"Follow the Rules" (1996)	"Where Can I Find Love" (1997)

Music video
- "Follow the Rules" on YouTube

"Follow the Rules'" is a song recorded by Italian electronic music group Livin' Joy. It was released on 14 October 1996 by MCA Records as the third single from the group's only album, Don't Stop Movin (1996). The song, written by vocalist Tameko Star with producer brothers Visnadi, was the follow-up to "Don't Stop Movin'", which had been a number-one hit in Italy. The single peaked at number three on the Italian singles chart, number nine in the UK and number twelve in Finland. It is an anthemic dance track based around the message of following your dreams and making them come true. In style it was similar to its predecessor, but with a heavier piano house/organ sound.

== Critical reception ==
A reviewer from Music Week gave the song a score of four out of five, describing it as "another storming anthem", that "will be another biggie and rouse interest in the album". In a retrospective review, Pop Rescue noted that the song "has some delicious Italia House piano over a great dance beat", complimenting it as "a positive uplifting track". Damien Mendis from the Record Mirror Dance Update" praised it, giving the song five out of five. He added that "now Visnadi and DJ Vioni are set to repeat that success [of 'Don't Stop Movin''] with another smash — and a possible number one? All their trademark elements are present to ensure maximum familiarity — in no less than nine mixes too. [...] Pure unashamed perfect pop dance. Love it."

== Chart performance ==
The song was a moderate success for Livin' Joy across Europe. The single was a top-10 hit in Italy, where it hit number three, and in the UK. On the UK Singles Chart, it managed to stay in the sales charts for five weeks after entering and peaking at number nine in mid-October 1996. Additionally, "Follow the Rules" reached number twelve in Finland, number sixteen in Scotland, number 28 in Ireland and number 29 in Sweden. On the Eurochart Hot 100, it peaked at number 27 in November 1996. Outside Europe, the single was a hit in Israel, peaking at number 12 and it also charted in Australia, reaching number 73 on the ARIA Chart.

== Airplay ==
In the UK, "Follow the Rules" received more than 500 plays a week on mainstream radio at its peak and around 45 regional radio stations were giving it support. On Capital Radio, it was more popular than "Dreamer" and "Don't Stop Movin'", while Atlantic 252 played it 54 times in the week it dropped out of the Top 40. Dance station Galaxy was playing it 50 times a week at the end of October and start of November 1996, while Radio One gave it between 15-18 plays per week. Music Week attributed its airplay success to the group's television exposure and performance on the Smash Hits Poll Winners' Party.

== Track listing ==
- 12" single, UK
1. "Follow the Rules" (Original Mix) — 3:51
2. "Follow the Rules" (Extended Under Mix) — 5:47
3. "Follow the Rules" (Do the Right Mix) — 5:33
4. "Follow the Rules" (Satoshi Tomiie's Transatlantic Club Mix) — 9:36
5. "Follow the Rules" (Light Piano Mix) — 3:15
- CD single, UK
1. "Follow the Rules" (Radio Mix) — 3:06
2. "Follow the Rules" (Original Mix) — 3:51
3. "Follow the Rules" (Transatlantic Club Mix) — 9:36
4. "Follow the Rules" (Extended Under Mix) — 5:47
5. "Follow the Rules" (Do the Right Mix) — 5:33
6. "Follow the Rules" (Light Piano Mix) — 3:15
- CD maxi, Italy
1. "Follow the Rules" (Radio Mix) — 3:12
2. "Follow the Rules" (Original Mix) — 3:50
3. "Follow the Rules" (Do the Right Mix) — 5:33
4. "Follow the Rules" (Light Piano Mix) — 3:07

== Charts ==
=== Weekly charts ===
Chart (1996)	Peak position
Australia (ARIA)	73
Europe (Eurochart Hot 100)	27
Europe (European Dance Radio)	11
Finland (Suomen virallinen lista)	12
Ireland (IRMA)	28
Israel (Israeli Singles Chart)	12
Italy (Musica e dischi)	3
Scotland (OCC)	16
Sweden (Sverigetopplistan)	29
UK Singles (Official Charts)	9
UK Dance (OCC)	13
UK Airplay (Music Week)	16
UK Pop Tip Club Chart (Music Week)	7

=== Year-end charts ===
Chart (1996)	Position
UK Pop Tip Club Chart (Music Week)	16
