= Finally (Velvet album) =

Studio album by Velvet
- Released: 20 March 2006
- Label: Bonnier Amigo

Velvet chronology
Finally (2006)	The Queen (2009)

Singles from Finally
- 1. "Rock Down to (Electric Avenue)" Released: 13 April 2005; 2. "Don't Stop Movin'" Released: 19 August 2005; 3. "Mi Amore" Released: 16 March 2006; 4. "Fix Me" Released: 3 February 2007

Finally is the debut studio album by Swedish singer Velvet first released on 20 March 2006 on Bonnier Amigo. Finally peaked at #46 in the Swedish charts and dropped off the chart after just one week.

== Singles ==
- Velvet's debut single "Rock Down To (Electric Avenue)" peaked at #6 in the Swedish charts and achieved the #1 spot on Sweden's dance chart. The song stayed in the charts for 11 weeks.
- "Don't Stop Movin'" peaked at #8 in Sweden and due to the popularity of the two singles Velvet conducted her first tour.
- "Mi Amore" was Velvet's third single and was also her first entry in Melodifestivalen (2006). The song failed to win but it charted in Greece, Hungary, Italy, Poland & Russia. The song was also later announced as 'Song of the Year 2006' in Bulgaria. The song peaked at #5 in Sweden.
- "Fix Me" peaked at #7 in Sweden but became known internationally - the song found itself in rotation in UK clubs. Due to its popularity her album Finally was re-released to include the track. The song was remixed and released to the UK on August 11, 2008.

== Track listing ==
Finally track listing
No.	Title	Writer(s)	Producer(s)	Length
1.	"City of Angels"	Mikael Albertsson; Niklas Pettersson	Albertsson; Pettersson	3:28
2.	"Rock Down to (Electric Avenue)"	Anoo Bhagavan; Eddy Grant; Jonas von der Burg; Niclas von der Burg	Jonas von der Burg	3:34
3.	"Mi Amore"	Joacim Persson; Niclas Molinder; Pelle Ankarberg	Twin	2:43
4.	"Doin' It"	Lisa Greene; Persson; Molinder; Ankarberg	GrooveFactory	3:54
5.	"Strangers"	Johann Fransson; Niklas Edberger; Tim Larsson; Tobias Lundgren	Fransson; Edberger; Larsson; Lundgren	3:41
6.	"Hey"	Adam Jewelle Baptiste; London; Rootation	Rootation	3:40
7.	"The Snake" (featuring Rigo)	Rob'n'Raz; Talhaoi	Cribe; Mårten Eriksson; Rob'n'Raz	3:56
8.	"DJ Take Me"	Andy Simon; Habib & Nierow	Simon; Habib & Nierow	3:30
9.	"In & Out of Love"	Charlie King; Dick Cruslock; Eric Le Tennen	DJ Dick; Tennen	3:13
10.	"Don't Stop Movin'"	Doris Diggs; Gianni Visnadi; Tameko Star	Jonas von der Burg	3:16
11.	"Don't Stop Movin'" (StoneBridge Rmx)	Persson; Molinder; Ankarberg	Twin; StoneBridge	8:08

2007 re-release bonus tracks
No.	Title	Writer(s)	Producer(s)	Length
12.	"Fix Me"	Pettersson	Pettersson	3:06
13.	"Fix Me" (DJ Cizo Remix featuring DMX)	Pettersson	Pettersson; DJ Cizo	4:22

== Charts ==
Weekly chart performance for Gone Too Long
Chart (2006)	Peak position
Swedish Albums (Sverigetopplistan)	46
