= The Queen (Velvet album) =

Studio album by Velvet
- Released: March 18, 2009
- Recorded: 2006–2008
- Genre: Dance-pop
- Length: 50:19
- Label: Bonnier
- Producer: Mathias Kallenberger, Andreas Berlin, Niklas Pettersson, Anton Malmberg Hård af Segerstad, Robert Uhlmann, Twin, Tony Nilsson

Velvet chronology
Finally (2006)	The Queen (2009)

Singles from The Queen
- 1. "Fix Me" Released: February 3, 2007; 2. "Chemistry" Released: July 15, 2007; 3. "Deja Vu" Released: February 11, 2008; 4. "Take My Body Close" Released: August 26, 2008; 5. "The Queen" Released: February 23, 2009; 6. "Come into the Night" Released: August 31, 2009; 7. "My Destiny" Released: March 8, 2010

Professional ratings
Review scores
Source	Rating
Teentoday.co.uk	4.0/5 stars

The Queen is the second studio album by Swedish singer Velvet. Her official website and her label Bonnier confirmed that The Queen would be released on March 18, 2009. The album features fourteen tracks including the singles "Fix Me", "Chemistry", "Déjà Vu", "Take My Body Close" and "The Queen". Also included is a cover of Ultravox's 1984 single "Dancing with Tears in My Eyes".

== Track listing ==
1. "The Queen" (Tony Nilsson, Henrik Janson) – 2:56
2. "Chemistry" (Niklas Pettersson, Tony Marty) – 2:59
3. "Take My Body Close" (Mathias Kallenberger, Andreas Berlin) – 3:33
4. "Sound of Music" (Anton Malmberg Hard, F. Persson, S. Engblom) – 3:17
5. "Radio Star" (Tony Nilsson) – 3:03
6. "My Rhythm" (Pettersson, M. Albertsson) – 3:35
7. "Play" (Pettersson, Albertsson) – 4:10
8. "Come into the Night" (Kallenberger, Berlin) – 3:27
9. "Déjà Vu" (J. Persson, N. Molinder, P. Ankarberg, N. Valsamidis, David Jassy, F. Larsson) – 3:05
10. "Dancing with Tears in My Eyes" (M. Ure, B. Currie, W. Cann, C. Allen) – 3:23
11. "Fix Me" (Pettersson) – 3:05
12. "My Destiny" (Kallenberger, Berlin) – 4:00
13. "The Queen" [Remix] (Tony Nilsson, Henrik Janson) – 3:38
14. "Chemistry" [Digital Dog Remix] (Pettersson, Marty) – 6:14

== Personnel ==
- Andreas Berlin – production, mixing, guitar
- Anton Malmberg Hard – production, mixing
- Fredrik Larson – production
- Henke Jonsson – mastering
- Jenny Petersson – vocals
- Johan Bejerholm – mixing
- Mathias Kallenberger – production, mixing
- Nicholas Mace – production, programming, remixing, keyboard
- Niklas Pettersson – production, mixing
- Niko Valsamidis – production
- Nathalie Berzelius – hair and make up
- Robert Uhlmann – production
- Stephen Cornish – production, programming, remixing, keyboard
- Tony Nilsson – production, remixing
- Twin – production, arrangement, mixing

== Charts ==
The Queen debuted on the Swedish Albums Chart at number 44, skipped a week, and then returned to the chart at number 53. After a two-week absence, the album returned at number 33, creating a new peak. It also charted in Norway where it entered the charts at number 40 before moving up to 34 and then 20.

Chart	Peak position	Weeks on chart
Swedish Albums Chart	33	3
Norwegian Albums Chart	17	6

=== Singles ===
Year	Title	Chart positions				
Year	Title	SWE	FI	RUS	TUR	US
2007	"Fix Me"	7	—	132	65	14
2007	"Chemistry"	8	6	—	10	—
2008	"Deja Vu"	2	—	—	1	—
2008	"Take My Body Close"	8	—	—	—	—
2009	"The Queen"	13	—	—	—	—
2009	"Come Into the Night"	44	—	—	—	—
2010	"My Destiny"	43	—	—	—	—
