= I'm in Love (Ola song) =

2012 song by Ola Svensson

Single by Ola

from the album Carelessly Yours
- Released: 26 October 2012
- Recorded: 2012
- Genre: Dance-pop; electropop
- Label: Columbia
- Songwriters: Ola Svensson; Alexander Kronlund; Johan Bobäck; Shellback; Dimitri Stassos; Mikaela Stenström
- Producers: Mohammed F. Ben Khalifa, Pasquale Verrigni

Ola singles chronology
"Riot" (2011)	"I'm in Love" (2012)	"Maybe" (2013)

"I'm in Love" is an English language song by Swedish singer Ola Svensson and his first international hit with his major success in the Italian Singles Chart reaching number four, in addition to appearing in the German and Australian Singles Charts. The song was co-written by Alexander Kronlund, Johan Bobäck, Shellback, Dimitri Stassos, Mikaela Stenström and Svensson himself, while being produced by Italian DJs/producers Pasquale Verrigni and Mohammed Ben Khalifa, better known under the alias Two Lions. The song is featured on Ola's album Carelessly Yours and also serves as the album's lead single.

== Versions ==
1. "I'm In Love" (Radio Edit) (3:21)
2. "I'm In Love" (Bodybangers Remix) (5:12)
3. "I'm In Love" (Club Junkies vs JRMX Remix) (6:50)
4. "I'm In Love" (Nino Fish Remix) (4:44)

== Charts ==
=== Weekly charts ===
Weekly chart performance for "I'm in Love"
Chart (2012–2013)	Peak position
Australia (ARIA)	60
Germany (GfK)	45
Italy (FIMI)	4
Russia Airplay (TopHit)	26
Turkey (Radiomonitor Top 100)	11
Ukraine Airplay (TopHit)	17

=== Year-end charts ===
Year-end chart performance for "I'm in Love"
Chart (2013)	Position
Italy (FIMI)	11
Russia Airplay (TopHit)	102
Ukraine Airplay (TopHit)	130
