= Keep It Simple (disambiguation) =

Keep It Simple is a 2008 solo studio album by singer/songwriter Van Morrison.

Keep It Simple may also refer to:

- KISS Principle
- Keep It Simple (Curtis Fuller album), 2005
- Keep It Simple (Keb' Mo' album), 2005
- Keep It Simple (Mohamed Ali album), 2009
- "Keep It Simple" (Delays song), 2008
- "Keep It Simple" (James Barker Band song), 2019
