= Good Enough (album) =

Studio album by Ola
- Released: 5 October 2007
- Recorded: 2007
- Genre: Pop
- Length: 41:13
- Label: mms records

Ola chronology
Given to Fly (2006)	Good Enough (2007)	Ola (2010)

Alternative cover
- Good Enough - The Feelgood Edition

Singles from Good Enough
- 1. "Natalie" Released: 1 June 2007; 2. "S.O.S." Released: 10 September 2007; 3. "Love in Stereo" Released: 9 March 2008; 4. "Feelgood" Released: 14 May 2008

Good Enough is the second studio album by Swedish pop singer Ola. The album originally debuted and peaked at number six on the Swedish Albums Chart, however it reached a new peak at number 2 when the album was re-released with a new track listing in 2008.

== Track listing ==
1. "S.O.S." (3:12)
2. "Totally Addicted" (3:43)
3. "Natalie" (3:08)
4. "My Addiction" (3:30)
5. "If You Gave Me Your Love" (3:21)
6. "Good Enough" (3:59)
7. "Can't Get Enough" (3:14)
8. "All It Takes" (3:24)
9. "Baby Girl" (3:04)
10. "Baby I'm Yours" (3:39)
11. "Who I Am" (3:45)

== Charts ==
Chart (2007)	Peak position
Swedish Albums (Sverigetopplistan)	6

== The Feelgood Edition ==
Following Ola's participation in Melodifestivalen 2008, with the song "Love in Stereo", the album was re-released as Good Enough - The Feelgood Edition. Consisting of his Melodifestivalen entry, as well as the follow-up single "Feelgood" and a few remixes, the album re-entered the Swedish Albums Chart and reached a new peak position at number two.

=== Re-release track listing ===
1. "S.O.S." (3:12)
2. "Totally Addicted" (3:43)
3. "Natalie" (3:08)
4. "My Addiction" (3:30)
5. "If You Gave Me Your Love" (3:21)
6. "Good Enough" (3:59)
7. "Can't Get Enough" (3:14)
8. "All It Takes" (3:24)
9. "Baby Girl" (3:04)
10. "Baby I'm Yours" (3:39)
11. "Who I Am" (3:45)
12. "Feelgood" (3:31)
13. "Natalie" (Radio version) [Stockholm-Uppsala remix] (6:43)
14. "S.O.S." [Stockholm-Uppsala remix] (3:36)
15. "If You Gave Me Your Love" (Recorded at P3 Live) (3:39)
16. "Love in Stereo" (3:00)

=== Charts ===
Chart (2008)	Peak position
Swedish Albums (Sverigetopplistan)	2
