= Ola Svensson =

Swedish recording artist (born 1986)

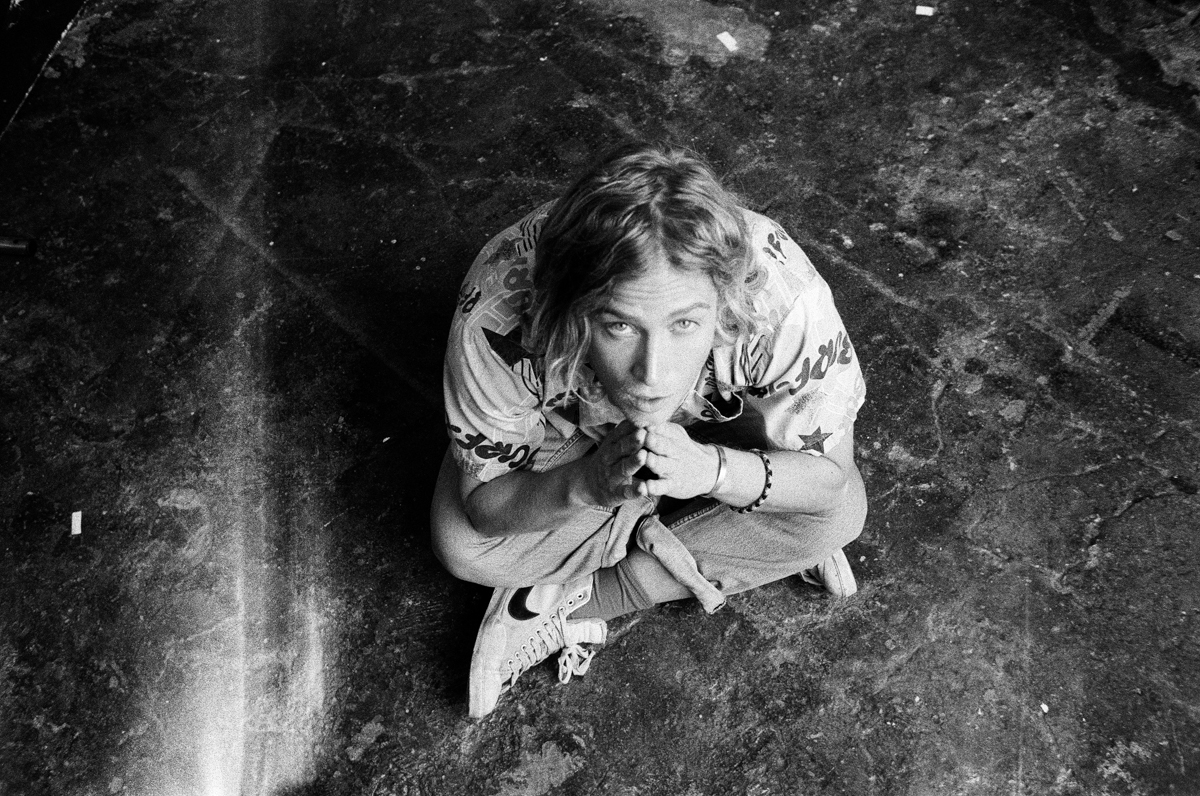

Background information
- Also known as: Ola; Brother Leo
- Born: Ola Nils Håkan Svensson; 23 February 1986 (age 40); Lund, Skåne, Sweden
- Genres: Pop
- Occupation: Singer
- Labels: Columbia Records; Oliniho Records (formerly Universal Music)
- Website: www.brother-leo.com

Ola Nils Håkan Svensson (born 23 February 1986) is a Swedish artist and songwriter, known professionally by the mononym Ola until 2014, and as Brother Leo from 2018 to present. Born in Lund, Skåne, his career began in 2005, when he finished eighth on season two of Swedish Idol. Since then, Ola has released four studio albums. Eleven of his singles have reached the top five on the Swedish singles chart, with six achieving number one, and nine attaining gold and platinum certifications. After being signed to Universal Music for many years, Ola founded his own record label Oliniho Records for the Swedish market, keeping distribution arrangements with Sony Music in Europe and internationally. Following a four-year break, he returned in 2018, recording under the stage name Brother Leo for Columbia Records.

== Early life ==
Ola was born to Swedish parents, and has two adopted brothers from El Salvador, Jonas and Daniel, both his elders. His second single "Brothers", deals in part with his relationship with his brothers.

By age five Ola began playing the piano at Lund's Municipal School of Music.

His grandfather was a major musical influence for him, and his passing when Ola was eight had a profound impact. In tribute, Ola joined a boys' choir in Lund at the age of nine.

Ola Svensson is an avid football (soccer) fan. Ola played for a long time for Trelleborgs FF before moving to the first-division team Vasalunds IF.

As an 11-year-old, Svensson had a starring role in the opera The Magic Flute at the Malmö City Theatre, directed by Philip Zandén.

== Idol ==
Encouraged by his friends, Svensson tried out to the Swedish Idol auditions. In 2005, Svensson auditioned for season 2 of the Swedish edition of Idol.

In the initial audition in Malmö, he sang "This I Promise You" from 'N Sync and later "Mandy" from Barry Manilow / Westlife and finally "Against All Odds" from Phil Collins as a duet. Just 19 and coming from Lund, he performed his qualifying audition "Show Me Heaven", a song from Maria McKee. The audition was broadcast on 21 September 2005 on Swedish TV4 channel.

In the live shows, he sang "My All" from Mariah Carey (Live Show 1, theme "My Own Idol"), "True Colors" from Cyndi Lauper (Live Show 2, theme: the 1980s) and "Kom igen, Lena" from Håkan Hellström (Live Show 3, theme: Swedish Hits) going to the next round on all three performances.

But he was eliminated on Live Show 4 broadcast on 21 October 2005, after performing Justin Timberlake's "Cry Me a River", receiving the lowest votes from the public. He finished the competition as eighth overall for the season.

== Early career ==
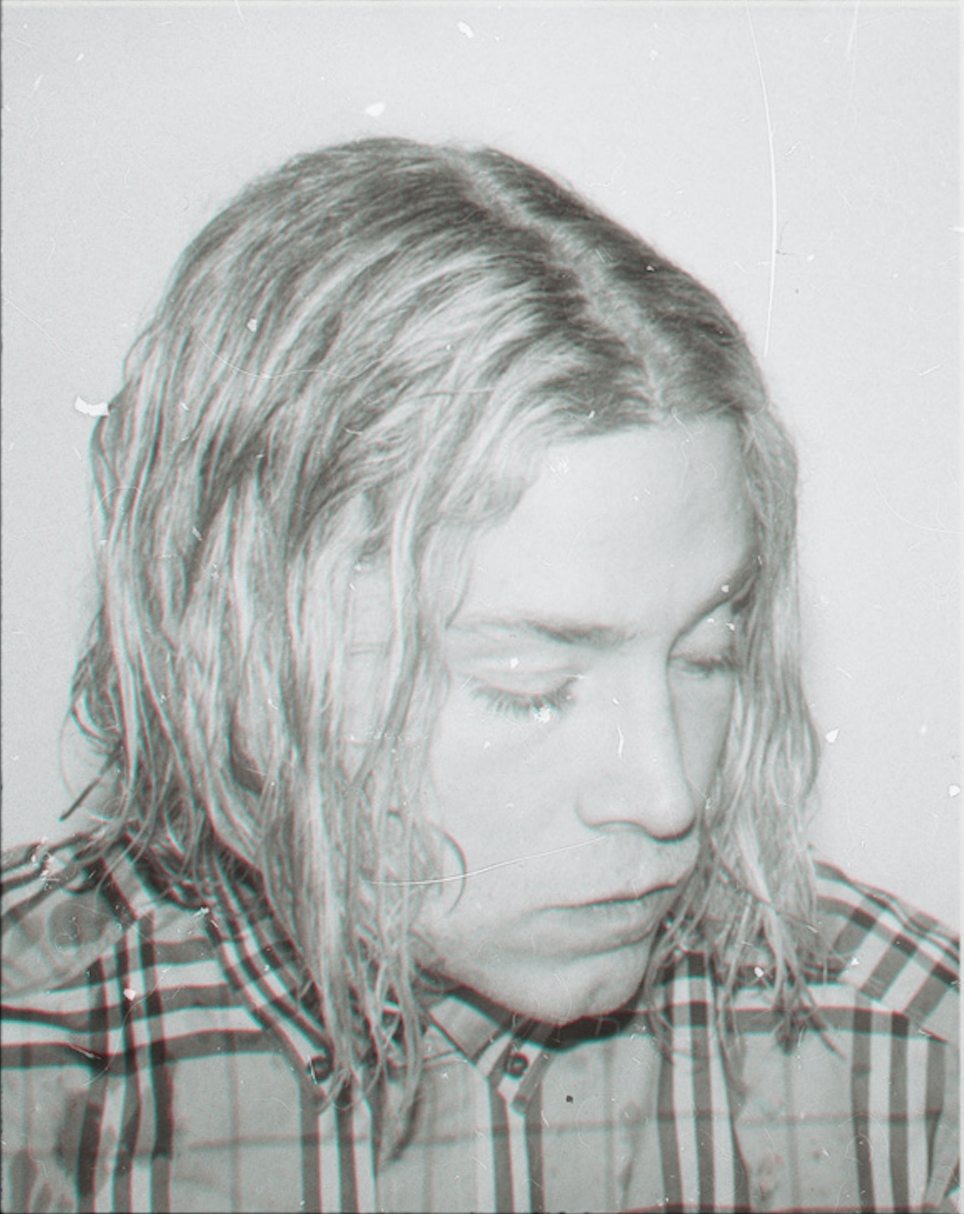

Despite being eliminated early from Idol, a record deal was soon signed with producer Jonas Saeed, and his debut album Given to Fly was released in June 2006, appearing straight at number one in Sverigetopplistan, the Swedish Albums Chart in its first week of release. His first single "Rain", a cover of a song by Anthony Callea was decided by a poll conducted on his website, winning 60% of his fans' votes.

Between 2005 and 2010, Ola released 8 singles with Universal Music, five of which reached no. 1 on the Swedish charts, and all gaining a top 5 spot. The single "Natalie", released on 7 June 2007, topped the Swedish singles chart for 5 weeks and was certified platinum. It aired in a number of European radios outside Sweden. The follow-up album Good Enough was released in autumn 2007 and reached number 2 on the album charts in Sweden.

In 2008, Ola won a coveted Rockbjörnen award in Sweden, for Best Song of the Year with "Feelgood". He has also received 14 nominations for the Rockbjörnen award and also a nomination for a Grammy Award. On 22 June 2009 Ola released the single "Sky's the Limit" that again topped the Swedish charts.

In 2009, having gained great success, he took part in the music event NJR in The Park and in Diggiloo Tour with Mojje, Lasse Holm and other artists. In autumn of 2009, Ola participated in the Swedish version of Clash of the Choirs known as Körslaget with his male choir Team Ola from hometown Lund. Finishing as winners of the competition, he donated 500,000 Swedish kronor (around 50,000 pounds) to refugee charity Tamam.

In June 2010, Ola released an EP on iTunes Sweden which featured the single "Overdrive", two new tracks from the upcoming album "All Over The World" and "Still Remember", and a remix of his previous single "Unstoppable".

== Melodifestivalen ==
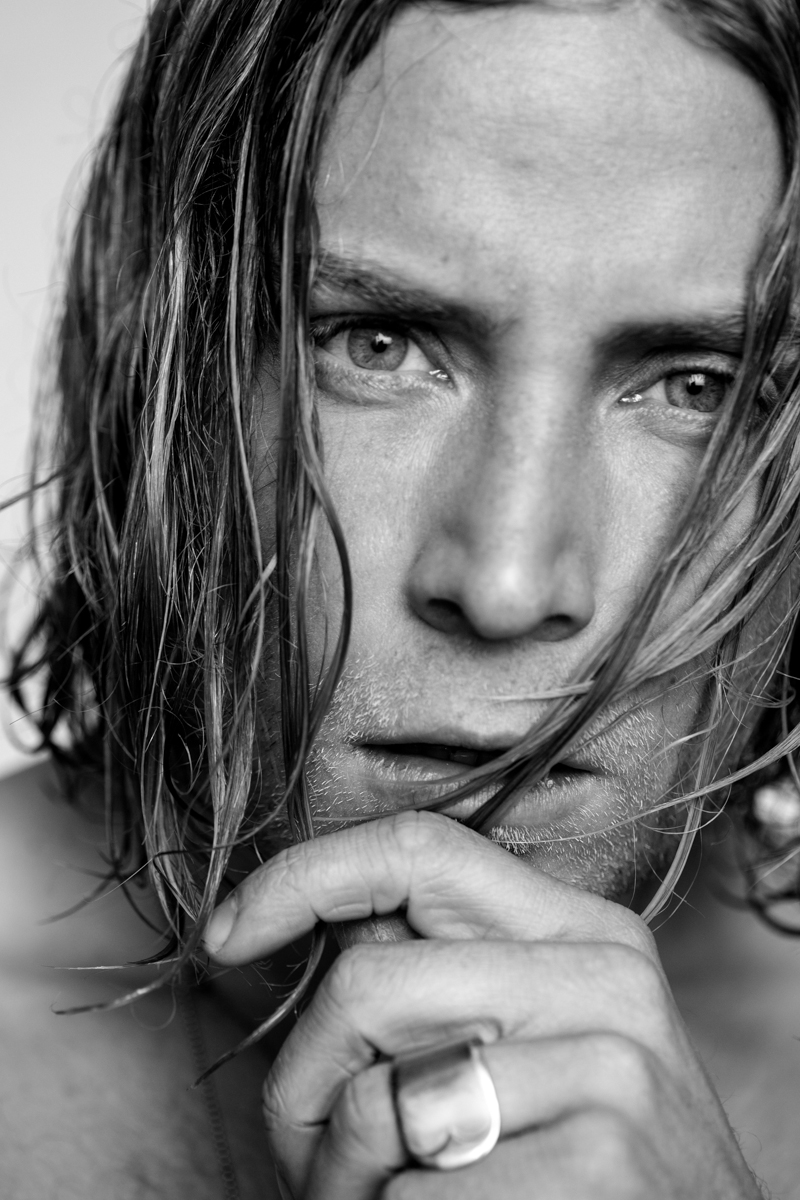

Ola has taken part in Melodifestivalen twice in a bid to represent Sweden at the Eurovision Song Contest in 2008 and in 2010. Ola first participated in Melodifestivalen 2008 appearing for the second semi-final on 16 February with the song "Love in Stereo". The song was written by Tony Nilsson and Mirja Breitholtz. He moved to the "second chance" phase in Kiruna on 8 March 2008 and was through in the first round against the band Caracola, but was overtaken by Sibel in the second round with her song "That Is Where I'll Go". Ola was eliminated without reaching the finals. Despite his failure, his song "Love in Stereo" charted in Sweden reaching number 2 in Sverigetopplistan, the official Swedish Singles Chart.

On 6 February 2010, Ola participated yet again in Melodifestivalen 2010. During the semifinal stage in Örnsköldsvik singing "Unstoppable", full title "Unstoppable (The Return of Natalie)", a reference to one of his initial big successes "Nathalie". The song was written by Ola together with Dimitri Stassos, Alexander Kronlund and Hanif Sabzevar. Ola sang first in the first heat, and qualified through to the final, held in Stockholm Globen Arena on 13 March 2010. He finished seventh in the final, with 47 points.

== Record companies ==
In June 2010, Ola bought himself out of his Universal Music contract after two albums with Universal, Given to Fly (2006) and Good Enough (2007) and started his own record company, Oliniho Records. His first album on the label, sef-titled as Ola reached number 3 on the Swedish Albums chart. The singles "Unstoppable" and "Overdrive" both became number one hits in Sweden. the single "All Over the World" was later awarded best Scandinavian pop song by the British music site Scandipop. On the Ola album, he collaborated with Alexander Kronlund and the English artist and songwriter Labrinth on the track "Let It Hit You".

During 2011, his company signed several international deals, amongst them, Europe, the US and UK. He is currently releasing music in mainland Europe with Sony Music. The newly established company said that after five years on a major, Ola [had] decided to start his own record company, Oliniho Records. Ola was quoted saying: "Why not try to do this myself. With the freedom I have today I think it's easier to follow my own direction and I can develop both my artistry and my songwriting in a more natural way."

In February 2016, Ola joined label Warner/Chappell and will release forthcoming albums through this label.

== International success ==
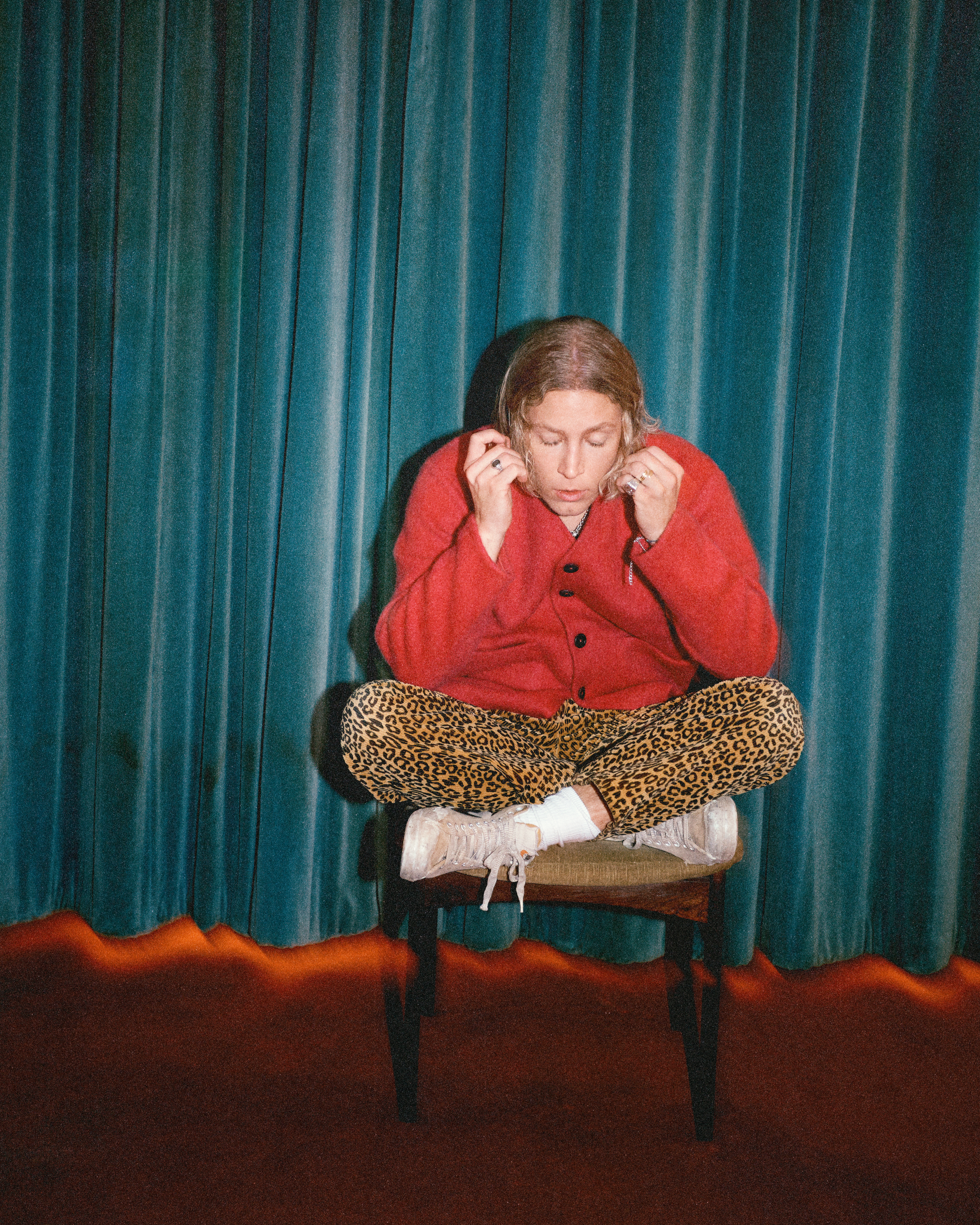

Ola's first UK single, "All Over the World", received much attention, becoming the most played video on 4 Music and The Box and being championed by Scott Mills on BBC Radio One on his show Ready for the Weekend. In the US it has entered the Hot Dance Airplay Chart and the Billboard Dance Chart. Ola also received attention from popular blogger Perez Hilton, who called the song "sweet sweet europop deliciousness".

In 2011, Ola Svensson / Oliniho Records signed contracts with several countries, including 3BEAT in England, David Gresham Records in South Africa, and Ultra Records in the United States.

In November 2011, Ola travelled to New York to film his music video to "All Over the World". It was released in South Africa, United States and England as per signed agreements and through All Around The World record label. The single reached the number 36 on the Billboard Dance Chart in the United States,

2012 began with Ola's first promotional tour of the US with notable concerts in New York and California to support the release of "All Over The World". Whilst there, he also found the time to shoot the video for his single "I'm in Love", in Los Angeles, the first taken from his upcoming fourth studio album. It was an international hit charting in German and Austrian charts and was a big hit in Italy's FIMI Singles Chart reaching number 4. The single was co-written by Ola and some others, alongside one of the more successful songwriters and producers in the world, Shellback, who has also written and produced for artists such as, One Direction, Pink and Usher. Ola also toured internationally to promote his hit single "All Over The World", that had found airplay notably in the UK, South Africa, Germany, Russia and the Middle East. The song went gold in Italy with and Ola's Italian tour.

Single "Maybe" was released in Sweden on 16 August 2013. The video for the single premiered at the music site Gaffa and was a hit on iTunes chart. The single "Jackie Kennedy" in Italy on 3 September 2013. It is taken from Ola's new album Carelessly Yours which was also released through his Oliniho Records. On the music video, Ola impersonates Jacqueline Kennedy Onassis in some scenes. A third single, "Tonight I'm Yours" was released in Sweden October 2013. The video filmed by video artist Åsa Riton, premiering at the Swedish music blog PSL

Carelessly Yours, released on 15 January 2014, reached number 4 on the Swedish album charts in its week of release. All the songs were written by Ola Svensson. He also took part in the production on several tracks. Partners on this album among others were Shellback, Johan Kermit Boback, Klas Åhlund and Patrik Berger. Svensson made an extensive tour in Sweden, Europe and internationally during 2013 and 2014 playing in twenty countries for promoting his international career.

Then he published an exclusive single for the Russian market called "This could be paradise" while in 2016 the Swedish DJ Philipp Mikal recorded a song with him called "Waiting 4".

== Television and radio ==
Since 2006, Ola has performed regularly and given interviews on Swedish television shows such as Gomorron Sverige, Förkväll, Vakna! Med The Voice, Sommarkrysset, Faddergalan, Celebration of the National Day, Bobster, and the morning shows on SVT1 and TV4, amongst others.

In 2007 he recorded the song "Du är Musiken i Mig" with Molly Sandén, which became the Swedish language version of "You Are the Music in Me" for the film High School Musical 2.

He took part in a short documentary My Life as Ola about his experience as an artist and as an individual. He also appeared in several programs including the Swedish series Så ska det låta.

Outside of Sweden, he has also taken part in the Polish "Sopot Festival" and "Hity Na Czasie" in August 2009 with the hit song, "S.O.S". Ola has also performed acoustic versions of his singles on radio stations such as RixFM, NRJ, Sveriges Radio and Mix Megapol.

In 2010, he recorded with Danish singer Mohamed Ali and Norwegian singer Endre Nordvik the song "Fire" for the Scandinavian Nordic version of the film Camp Rock 2. The song appeared on the soundtrack album Camp Rock 2: The Final Jam.

He has also performed in televised concerts outside of Sweden such as Europa Plus LIVE in Russia in 2013.

He performed the song "Rich & Young" on 9 May 2014 in the eighth episode of stand-up comedy television show Colorado broadcast on Italia 1, further reinforcing his popularity among the Italian audience.

== Discography ==
=== Studio Albums as Ola ===
Title	Album details	Peak chart positions	Certifications
Title	Album details	SWE	Certifications
Given to Fly	Released: 12 June 2006; Label: MMS Records, AristoTracks; Format: digital download, CD	1	
Good Enough	Released: 5 October 2007; Label: MMS Records, AristoTracks; Format: digital download, CD	6	
Good Enough (The Feelgood Edition)	Released: 2008; Label: MMS Records, AristoTracks; Format: digital download, CD	2	
Ola	Released: 15 September 2010; Label: Oliniho Records; Format: digital download, CD	3	
Carelessly Yours	Released: 7 January 2014; Label: Oliniho Records; Format: digital download, CD	4	

=== Studio Albums as Brother Leo ===
Title	Album details	Peak chart positions	Certifications
Title	Album details	SWE	Certifications
PoP Poetry	Released: 16 September 2022; Label: Oliniho Records; Format: digital download	—	

== Singles ==
=== Ola ===
Title	Year	Peak positions				Certification	Album
Title	Year	SWE	GER	ITA	TUR	Certification	Album
"Rain"	2006	1	—	—	—		Given to Fly
"Brothers"	2006	4	—	—	—		Given to Fly
"Natalie"	2007	1	—	—	—	SWE: Platinum	Good Enough
"S.O.S."	2007	1	—	—	—	SWE: Gold	Good Enough
"Love in Stereo"	2008	2	—	—	—	SWE: Gold	Good Enough – The Feelgood Edition
"Feelgood"	2008	2	—	—	—	SWE: 2× Platinum	Good Enough – The Feelgood Edition
"Sky's the Limit"	2009	1	—	—	—	SWE: Gold	Non-album single
"Unstoppable (The Return of Natalie)"	2010	1	—	—	94	SWE: Platinum	Ola
"Overdrive"	2010	1	—	—	—	SWE: Gold	Ola
"All Over the World"	2010	3	—	—	21	SWE: Gold	Ola
"Riot"	2011	3	—	—	—		Ola
"I'm in Love"	2012	—	45	4	11	ITA: 2× Platinum	Carelessly Yours
"Maybe"	2013	—	—	—	20		Carelessly Yours
"Jackie Kennedy"	2013	—	—	32	—		Carelessly Yours
"Tonight I'm Yours"	2013	—	—	—	—		Carelessly Yours
"Rich & Young"	2014	—	—	—	—		Carelessly Yours
"Losin' It"	2014	—	—	—	—		Carelessly Yours
"This Could Be Paradise"	2014	—	—	—	—		Non-album single
"—" denotes releases that did not chart or were not released in that territory.

=== Brother Leo ===
Title	Year	Album
"Strangers on an Island"	2018	
"Push Up"	2018	Non-album single
"Shine"	2019	Non-album single
"Barcelona"	2019	PoP Poetry
"Hallelujah"	2020	PoP Poetry
"Sad Child" (with Sandro Cavazza)	2020	PoP Poetry
"People"	2021	PoP Poetry
"Naked"	2021	PoP Poetry
"Living In A Zoo"	2022	PoP Poetry
"Hello Life (Live from the PoP Poetry Café)"	2022	Non-album single
"Caroline"	2022	PoP Poetry
"Sunshine"	2022	PoP Poetry
"Demons" (with Why So Sad)	2023	Non-album single
"Biohacking My Technology" (with Ferris Pier)	2024	Non-album single
"I Like" (with Ferris Pier)	2025	Non-album single

=== Collaborations ===
Year	Title	Chart peak (SWE)	Notes
as Ola			
2007	"Du är musiken i mig" (Molly Sandén and Ola)	21	From High School Musical 2 Swedish version of "You Are the Music in Me"
2010	"Fire" (Ola, Mohamed Ali and Endre Nordvik)	—	From Camp Rock 2 Scandinavian version of "Fire"
2016	"Waiting 4" (Philipp Mikal feat. Ola)	—	
as Brother Leo			
2019	"LIITA" (Felix Jaehn, Breaking Beattz feat. Brother Leo)	—	
2020	"Sad Child" (Sandro Cavazza, Brother Leo)	—	
2023	"Magic" (K391 feat. Brother Leo)	—	
"—" denotes releases that did not chart or were not released in that territory.
