= Mohamed Ali (singer) =

Danish singer

- Birth name: Mohamed Ahmed Ali
- Also known as: Mohamed
- Born: 7 September 1993 (age 31); Nørresundby, Aalborg Municipality, Denmark
- Genres: Pop, dance
- Occupation: Singer
- Instruments: Vocals
- Years active: 2007–present
- Labels: Sony (2009–present)
- Website: www.mohamedali.dk

Mohamed Ahmed Ali (Arabic: محمد أحمد علي; born 7 September 1993), also known by the mononym Mohamed, is a Danish singer. Ali was born in Nørresundby, Aalborg. In 2009, he took part in Season 2 of The X Factor, coming third after winner Linda Andrews and runners up Alien Beat Club. After the series, he signed a contract with Sony Music. On the occasion, Karina Foss Fenn of Sony Music Entertainment Denmark was quoted as saying: "It is rare that we in the music industry encounter a natural talent like Mohamed Ali. Both in his vocals and his physique, he oozes musicality – and his voice has both power and a sweetness that makes his rhythm quite unique." The music will no doubt to reflect Mohamed's personality". This contract resulted in a debut album Keep It Simple of 12 original songs and his single "Rocket" became one of the best downloaded songs.

== Beginnings ==
Mohamed Ali was born in Denmark to an Egyptian father and Iraqi mother. He started early through an appearance in "Scenen er din" (translated as "the stage is yours), in 2007. His parents had been divorced one year earlier in 2006. He lived with his mother Ahlam and three older sisters Fatima, Meriam and Asia.

== X Factor ==
He applied for the Danish version of The X Factor singing competition in 2009 where he reached the Final 3 and was a clear favorite to win. He sang the following songs:

Date	Theme	Performer	Song	Result
13 February 2009	Hits	Amerie	"1 Thing"	Safe to next round
20 February 2009	Made in Denmark	OneTwo	"Det er sent nu"	Safe to next round
27 February 2009	Motown	The Jackson 5	"I Want You Back"	Safe to next round
6 March 2009	ABBA songs	ABBA	"SOS"	Safe to next round
13 March 2009	DR Bigband	Beyoncé feat. Jay-Z	"Crazy in Love"	Bottom 2, Saved
20 March 2009	Sanne Salomonsen songs	Sneakers	"Efter Festen"	Bottom 2, Saved by public
20 March 2009	Dedication	Michael Jackson	"Dirty Diana"	Bottom 2, Saved by public
27 March 2009	Free choice	Daniel Bedingfield / Katy Perry	"If You're Not the One" / "Hot n Cold"	Finished third

- In the finals, he got fewest SMS votes in a closely run race in which he lagged by just 2% of the votes to the runner-up in Top 3 and was able to amass big number of fans through his Facebook site (more than 70,000 friends).

== After X Factor ==
In May 2009, he appeared as an opening act for Beyoncé when she sang in Denmark.

Having signed a contract with Sony Music, he had a debut hit with "Rocket" a song that entered the Danish Singles Chart in week 10/2009. The single peaked at No. 12 in the charts and spent a total of 20 weeks on the Danish charts.

He had a comeback through a release on disco:wax record label and distribution by Sony with the song "Den du er".

In 2010, he recorded with Swedish singer Ola Svensson and Norwegian singer Endre Nordvik the song "Fire" for the Scandinavian Nordic version of the film Camp Rock 2. The song appeared on the soundtrack album Camp Rock 2: The Final Jam.

== Dansk Melodi Grand Prix ==
In 2013, he came back to take part in Dansk Melodi Grand Prix in a bid to represent Denmark in Eurovision Song Contest 2013 with the song "Unbreakable" written by Morten Friis, Michael Parsberg, Peter Bjørnskov, Lene Dissing. He was one of ten contestants to take part and qualified for the final 3 alongside Simone with "Stay Awake" and Emmelie de Forest with "Only Teardrops". Mohamed Ali finished second overall with de Forest winning the bid to sing the Danish entry to Eurovision 2013. Despite his failure to win the contest, "Unbreakable" proved popular and was released as a single and is only his second charted single after "Rocket".

The Superfinal

Draw	Artist	Song	Cutfather	Lis Sørensen	Jørgen de Mylius	Maria Lucia	Kato	SMS voting	Total	Place
6	Simone	"Stay Awake"	1	1	2	2	2	7	15	3
8	Emmelie de Forest	"Only Teardrops"	3	3	3	1	1	15	26	1
10	Mohamed Ali	"Unbreakable"	2	2	1	3	3	8	19	2

== Discography ==
=== Albums ===
Year	Title	Peak position	Certification
Year	Title	DAN	Certification
2009	Keep It Simple	2	

=== Singles ===
Year	Single	Peak position	Album	Notes
Year	Single	DAN	Album	Notes
2009	"Rocket"	12	Keep It Simple	
2012	"Den du er"	–	Non-album release	
2013	"Unbreakable"	4	Non-album release	From Dansk Melodi Grand Prix 2013

Other (non-charting)

- 2009: "Holla!"
- 2010: "Fire" (with Ola and Endre Nordvik)
- 2012: "Ser dig"

=== Collaboration ===
- 2009: "All About Love" by Anna David feat. Mohamed Ali
