= Don't Stop Movin' (Livin' Joy song) =

1996 single by Livin' Joy

- The 1996 CD single with Tameko Star

Single by Livin' Joy

from the album Don't Stop Movin'
- Released: 3 June 1996 (UK)
- Genre: House
- Length: 5:20 (album version); 3:40 (single version); 3:00 (video edit)
- Label: MCA
- Songwriters: Tameko Star; Gianni Visnadi; Paolo Visnadi
- Producers: Gianni Visnadi; Paolo Visnadi

Livin' Joy singles chronology
"Dreamer" (1994)	"Don't Stop Movin'" (1996)	"Follow the Rules" (1996)

Music video
- "Don't Stop Movin'" on YouTube

"Don't Stop Movin'" is a song by Italian electronic dance music group Livin' Joy. It was released on 3 June 1996 by MCA Records. It is the follow-up release to their previous single, "Dreamer", which was a number-one hit in the UK in 1995. After the group failed to reach a deal with Janice Robinson, the original vocalist on "Dreamer", Tameko Star joined the group as their new vocalist. The song was released as a single from their only album, Don't Stop Movin' (1996). It features vocals by Tameko Star who also co-wrote the song with producer-brothers Gianni and Paolo Visnadi.

"Don't Stop Movin" peaked at number one in Italy and number 12 on the Eurochart Hot 100. In the UK, it peaked at number five on the UK Singles Chart, spending seven weeks in the top 10. It ended the year as the UK's 34th-biggest-selling single of 1996.

== Critical reception ==
Larry Flick from Billboard magazine constated that the new singer of the group "has the pipes to make this happy-house anthem work". He also noted that the song "has a lot of pep and radio-friendly energy". Kristy Barker from Melody Maker named it this year's "Glorious Pop Rush" Top 3 with Spice Girls' "Wannabe" and "Say You'll Be There". A reviewer from Music & Media described it as a "bouncy number ready for embrace", adding, "The ingredients: a pounding beat, assured female vocals (Tameko Star) and a strong chorus. Radio should take notice." Music Week gave it a score of four out of five, writing, "It has the same feelgood vibe and incredibly catchy hook as 'Dreamer' and, although matching its success was always going to be difficult, this is pretty good going."

In a retrospective review, Pop Rescue named it "the motivational poster of 90s dance music", stating that Star "makes light work of the lyrics with her powerful vocals." Dave Fawbert from ShortList complimented the song as "one of those brilliant '90s follow-ups-to-a-hit-that-is-basically-the-same-but-not-quite-as-good-but-that-basically-means-it's-still-brilliant. Coming after "Dreamer", it fulfilled its mission perfectly." Toni Birghental from Sun-Sentinel felt it "sets the album's mood. The words, "You can be mystical, magical, physically phenomenal, good to go, not too slow", along with the high energy music are great motivation for aerobics fans."

== Chart performance ==
In Europe, "Don't Stop Movin'" peaked at number one in Italy, remaining at this position for three weeks. Within that time, the single sold 11,000 copies in the country. In the United Kingdom, it debuted and peaked at number five on the UK Singles Chart on 9 June 1996. The single spent seven weeks in the UK top 10 and 14 weeks on the chart. On the UK Dance Singles Chart, it reached number one. It entered the top 10 in Finland and Sweden and the top 20 in Iceland, Ireland, Latvia and the Netherlands. It also peaked at number two on the Swedish Dance chart and number 12 on the Eurochart Hot 100. Outside Europe, "Don't Stop Movin'" reached number two on the RPM Dance chart in Canada and number three on the US Billboard Dance Club Play chart. In Oceania, it reached number six on the Australian ARIA singles chart. In West Asia, the song peaked at number eight in Israel, in its second week on the chart, on 18 June 1996. "Don't Stop Movin'" was awarded with a gold record in Australia and the United Kingdom, after 35,000 and 400,000 singles were shipped, respectively.

== Track listings ==
- 12-inch single – Italy (1996)
1. "Don't Stop Movin'" (single version) – 3:40
2. "Don't Stop Movin'" (album version) – 5:20
3. "Don't Stop Movin'" (Want-Will H-Mix) – 5:59
4. "Don't Stop Movin'" (A-Manetta Mix) – 5:46
5. "Don't Stop Movin'" (Gettin' Right Mix) – 5:25
6. "Don't Stop Movin'" (Gettin' Right Reprise) – 4:11
- CD single – France & UK (1996)
1. "Don't Stop Movin'" (single version) – 3:40
2. "Don't Stop Movin'" (album version) – 5:20
3. "Don't Stop Movin'" (Gettin' Right Mix) – 5:25
- CD maxi – Europe (1996)
1. "Don't Stop Movin'" (single version) – 3:40
2. "Don't Stop Movin'" (album version) – 5:20
3. "Don't Stop Movin'" (Want-Will H-Mix) – 5:59
4. "Don't Stop Movin'" (A-Manetta Mix) – 5:46
5. "Don't Stop Movin'" (Gettin' Right Mix) – 5:25
6. "Don't Stop Movin'" (Gettin' Right Reprise) – 4:11
- Cassette single – UK (1996)
1. "Don't Stop Movin'" (single version) – 3:40
2. "Don't Stop Movin'" (album version) – 5:20

== Charts ==
=== Weekly charts ===
Chart (1996–1997)	Peak position
Australia (ARIA)	6
Belgium (Ultratop 50 Flanders)	36
Canada Dance/Urban (RPM)	2
Estonia (Eesti Top 20)	20
Europe (Eurochart Hot 100)	12
Europe (European Dance Radio)	9
Europe (European Hit Radio)	21
Finland (Suomen virallinen lista)	7
Iceland (Íslenski Listinn Topp 40)	15
Ireland (IRMA)	14
Israel (Israeli Singles Chart)	8
Italy (Musica e dischi)	1
Latvia (Latvijas Top 50)	11
Netherlands (Dutch Top 40)	21
Netherlands (Single Top 100)	19
Scottish Singles Sales (Official Charts)	7
Sweden (Sverigetopplistan)	8
Sweden (Swedish Dance Chart)	2
UK Singles (Official Charts)	5
UK Dance (Official Charts)	1
UK Airplay (Music Week)	5
UK Pop Tip Club Chart (Music Week)	2
US Billboard Hot 100	67
US Dance Club Play (Billboard)	3
US Maxi-Singles Sales (Billboard)	14

=== Year-end charts ===
Chart (1996)	Position
Australia (ARIA)	57
Canada Dance/Urban (RPM)	25
Europe (Eurochart Hot 100)	93
Latvia (Latvijas Top 50)	93
Sweden (Topplistan)	73
Sweden (Swedish Dance Chart)	11
UK Singles (OCC)	34
UK Airplay (Music Week)	25
UK Club Chart (Music Week)	58
UK Pop Tip Club Chart (Music Week)	15

Chart (1997)	Position
US Dance Club Play (Billboard)	40

== Certifications ==
Region	Certification	Certified units/sales
Australia (ARIA)	Gold	35,000^{^}
United Kingdom (BPI)	Platinum	600,000^{‡}
^{^} Shipments figures based on certification alone.^{‡} Sales+streaming figures based on certification alone.

== Release history ==
Region	Date	Format(s)	Label(s)	Ref.
United Kingdom	3 June 1996	12-inch vinyl; CD; cassette	MCA	
United States	7 January 1997	Rhythmic contemporary radio	MCA	
United States	21 January 1997	Contemporary hit radio	MCA	

== Cover versions ==
The song was covered by Swedish singer Velvet on her 2006 album Finally.
