= Velvet (singer) =

Swedish singer (born 1975)

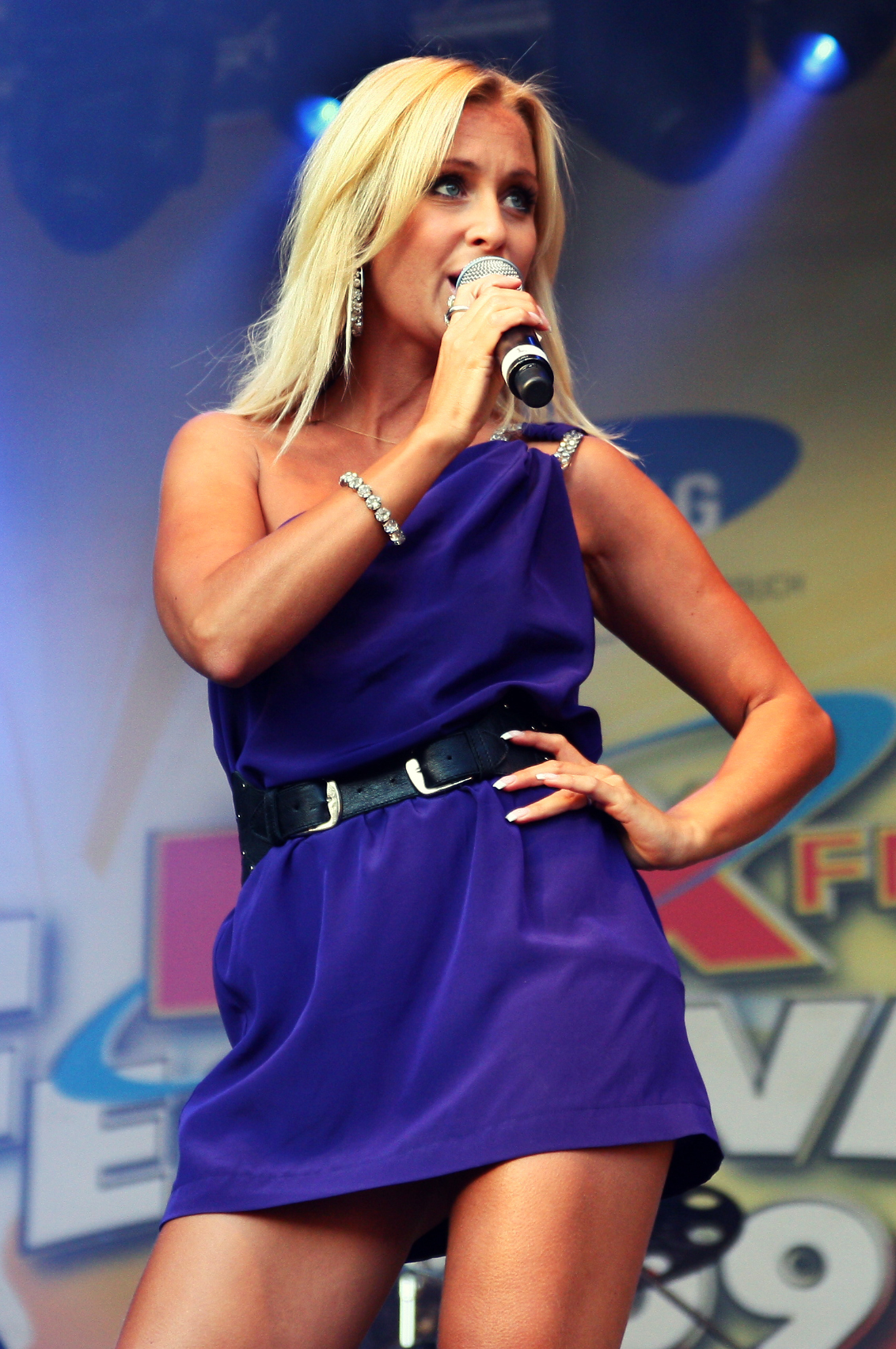
- Velvet singing at Rix FM Festival 2009

Background information
- Also known as: Velvet (stage name)
- Born: Jenny Marielle Pettersson; 5 November 1975 (age 50)
- Origin: Helsingborg, Sweden
- Genres: Europop
- Occupation: singer
- Years active: 2005–present
- Label: Bonnier Amigo

Jenny Marielle Pettersson (born 5 November 1975), professionally known as Velvet, is a Swedish dance-pop singer. She has released two albums since her 2005 debut in the music industry and her first eight singles have all achieved a top-twenty peak on the Swedish Singles Chart.

== Early life ==
Velvet moved from Helsingborg to Stockholm in 1993 to study ballet at Balettakademien. She soon took singing lessons at a dance school where she "got a voice". She worked at Wallmans cabaret where she discovered that singing was what she really wanted to do. She then toured for eight years as a choir singer and dancer to major artists such as Lena PH, Markoolio, Carola, Sanne Salomonsen, Orup, Meat Loaf, Martin Stenmarck and Jessica Folcker.

Velvet was also a part of the house choir for the Swedish Eurovision organisation for five years and traveled to the various Eurovision Song Contests across Europe.

== Music ==
Velvet was discovered in 2005 and signed with Bonnier Amigo Music Group. She stated that she came up with the name "Velvet" on her own after receiving what she referred to as "bad suggestions" from her record company. She settled on "Velvet" because she wanted to pick something that suited her and that she could stand for.

Velvet soon released her first single, "Rock Down To (Electric Avenue)" (with chorus from 1980s song "Electric Avenue)", which was a big hit in Sweden and internationally. The single, still frequently played in clubs across Sweden, reached number one in the Swedish Dance Charts for 22 weeks. Her follow-up single, "Don't Stop Movin'", was also popular and was followed by a tour.

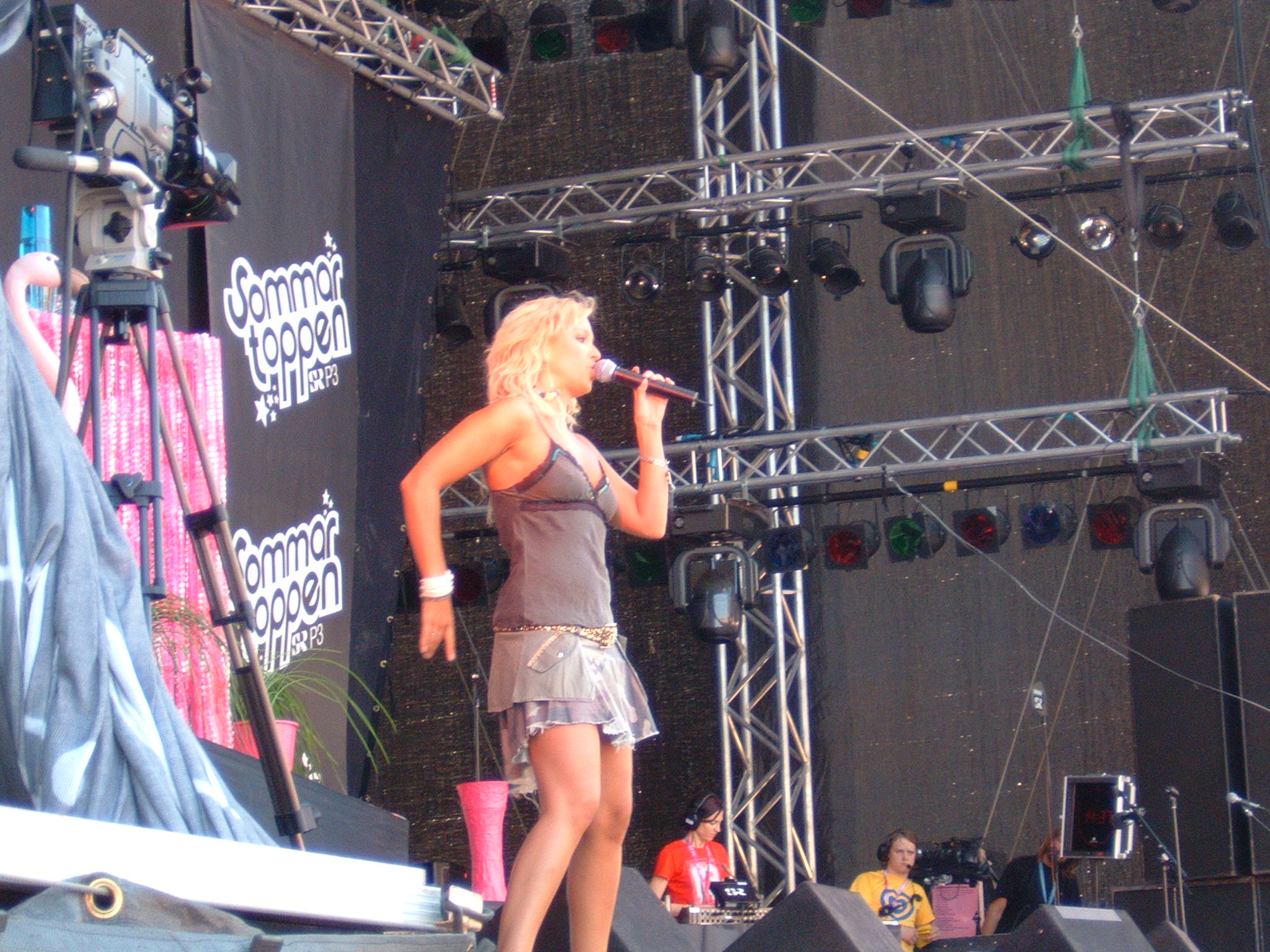
Velvet on tour in 2005

In 2006 Velvet entered Melodifestivalen to represent Sweden at the Eurovision Song Contest but lost the spot to Carola. She entered with the song "Mi Amore", which rapidly became a favourite and achieved great success internationally & became Song of the Year 2006 in Bulgaria. It remained high in charts in Russia, Poland, Hungary, Greece and Italy. In this year Velvet released her debut album, Finally.

In 2007 Velvet released her fourth single, "Fix Me", which has been added to the re-release of Finally. The song failed to chart as high as her previous singles in Poland and Russia, but became a big success in the US, peaking at No. 14. Later in August she released her fifth single, "Chemistry", it being the only one of her singles to chart in Finland.

Alongside her singing career, Velvet has also worked as a show producer for several Christmas galas around Sweden, where she has also taken part as an artist.

In 2008 Velvet again took part in Melodifestivalen with the song "Deja Vu". Even though she received great reviews, as well as the song, she was knocked out in one of the semi-final rounds, missing the final. This was Velvet's second attempt to represent Sweden in the Eurovision Song Contest. "Deja Vu" was her most successful song in Sweden, but was her only single to not chart anywhere else but there.

After a strong presence in the UK club music scene for several years, "Fix Me" was officially released on 11 August 2008. Later that month, Velvet also released her new single "Take My Body Close", which reached No. 8 in Sweden and No. 14 in Poland.

"Chemistry" was released as a single in the US on 11 November 2008 as a digital download, followed by a physical release on 25 November. It includes the original version of the song and four remixes, but failed to chart. A music video for the song was shot in London in December 2008, and the song will be released in UK sometime in 2009.

Velvet competed in Melodifestivalen 2009 singing "The Queen" composed by Tony Nilsson and Henrik Janson. She was in the third semi-final in Leksand on 21 February 2009 but only reached 6th place. Her official website and her label Bonnier confirmed that her second album The Queen would be released on 18 March 2009. The album includes the singles "Fix Me", "Chemistry", Déjà Vu", "Take My Body Close", "The Queen" and "Come into The Night".

In 2010 Velvet teamed up with PJ to record a cover version of Edward Maya's "Stereo Love", which was only released on various compilation albums. In 2011 Velvet released her single "Love Struck". In 2014 Velvet released her single "Enemy". In 2015 Velvet released her single "Friendly Fire", and in 2017 collaborated with fellow Swedish singer Therese on their track "Don't Stop".

== Discography ==
=== Albums ===
Year	Album	Sweden	Norway	Poland
Year	Album	Peak	Peak	Peak
2006	Finally	46	–	–
2009	The Queen	33	17	59

=== Singles ===
Year	Title	Album	Chart Positions						
Year	Title	Album	SWE	FIN	PT	RUS	ROM	TUR	US Hot Dance
2005	"Rock Down To (Electric Avenue)"	Finally	6	—	19	6	—	—	—
2006	"Don't Stop Moving"	Finally	8	—	—	46	—	—	—
2006	"Mi Amore"	Finally	5	—	—	6	—	—	—
2007	"Fix Me"	The Queen	7	—	—	132	—	65	14
2007	"Chemistry"	The Queen	8	6	—	—	3	45	—
2008	"Déjà Vu"	The Queen	2	—	—	—	—	39	—
2008	"Take My Body Close"	The Queen	8	—	—	—	—	—	—
2009	"The Queen"	The Queen	13	—	—	—	—	—	—
2009	"Come into the Night"	The Queen	44	—	—	—	—	—	—
2010	"Victorious" (with Linda Bengtzing)	-	15	—	—	—	—	—	—
2010	"My Destiny"	The Queen	43	—	—	—	—	—	—
2011	"Love Struck"	—	—	—	—	—	—	—	—
2014	"Enemy"	—	—	—	—	—	—	—	—
2015	"Friendly Fire"	—	—	—	—	—	—	—	—
2017	"Don't Stop" (with Therese)	—	—	—	—	—	—	—	—
2020	"Saturday or Sunday Night" (feat. House of Dreams)	—	—	—	—	—	—	—	—
2023	"La Isla Bonita"	—	—	—	—	—	—	—	—
2024	"Beautiful Pain"	—	—	—	—	—	—	—	—
