= Mirja Breitholtz =

Swedish songwriter and producer

Mirja Breitholtz is a Swedish songwriter and producer. She has also taken some television roles. She is living with artist and fellow songwriter Tony Nilsson.

A composer of songs. she has contributed to a string of hits by well-known Swedish artists. Many of her songs have featured in Melodifestivalen and in Swedish Singles Chart. She's also part of the producer duo 528 (together with Tony Nilsson) 528 writes mainly music to Film and TV Mirja is also the co-owner of the independent record label Hurdy Gurdy Noise

== Discography ==
- 2007: "Who I am" sung by Ola Svensson (co-written with Tony Nilsson)
- 2008: "Love in Stereo" sung by Ola Svensson (co-written with Tony Nilsson)
- 2009: "Vives Na Minha Alma sung by Ferreria Mila (co-written with Tony Nilsson Anna Nordell)
- 2010: "Doctor Doctor" sung by Elin Lanto (co-written with Tony Nilsson)
- 2010: "All over the World" Ola Svensson by (co-written with Tony Nilsson Ola Svensson and Alexander Kronlund)
- 2010: "Hater" sung by Elin Lanto (co-written with Tony Nilsson)
- 2014: Beez Kneez sung by Mirja feat Troy Jamz (co-written with Troy Jamz)
- 2015: "Drum n Bass" sung by Isa (co-written with Tony Nilsson and Isa Tengblad)
- 2015: "Happy Hours" artist John De Sohn feat Sigrid Bernson (Co-written Tony Nilsson Sigrid Bernson and Björn Johansson)
- 2016: "One" artist Amy Deasismont (Co-written with Tony Nilsson and Amy Deasismont)
- 2016: "Living Inside A Dream" Artist Ellie Drennan ( Co-written with Tony Nilsson Benjamin Ingrosso and Mutt Lange)

== Filmography ==
- 2006: Hotel Babylon as Mrs. Rautenan (TY, 1 episode)
- 2006: Outbreak Investigation as Anita Flacke (TV, 1 episode entitled Return of the Speckled Monster)
