= Where Can I Find Love =

Single by Livin' Joy

from the album Don't Stop Movin
- Released: 24 March 1997
- Length: 3:50
- Label: MCA
- Songwriters: Tameko Star; Gianni Visnadi; Paolo Visnadi
- Producer: Gianni Visnadi

Livin' Joy singles chronology
"Follow the Rules" (1996)	"Where Can I Find Love" (1997)	"Deep in You" (1997)

Music video
- "Where Can I Find Love" on YouTube

"Where Can I Find Love'" is a song recorded by Italian electronic music group Livin' Joy, released in March 1997 by MCA Records as the fourth single from their only album, Don't Stop Movin (1996). The song is written by singer Tameko Star with producer-brothers Gianni and Paolo Visnadi. Lyrically, it focuses on the struggles to find true love. Its accompanying music video features Star walking around in a nightclub, bumping into various men who catch her attention. Each man is then shown to have an 'issue' which leaves Star disappointed.

"Where Can I Find Love" peaked at number 12 in the UK, on both the UK Singles Chart and the UK Dance Chart. Additionally, it became a top-20 hit also in Italy and Scotland. On the Eurochart Hot 100, it reached number 45 in April 1997. Outside Europe, the single charted in Israel and Australia, peaking at numbers 17 and 142. British magazine Music Week gave the song a score of four out of five, writing, "Livin' Joy's familiar formula – fast-moving, slick and funky – is set to provide another huge club and chart hit. Quality stuff."

== Track listing ==
- 12", Italy

A1. "Where Can I Find Love" (Original Extended Mix) – 5:11
A2. "Where Can I Find Love" (Mark!s Anybody Dub) – 9:40
B1. "Where Can I Find Love" (A-Manetta Club Mix) – 6:06
B2. "Where Can I Find Love" (Mark!s Hutch Vocal) – 9:07

- CD single, UK
1. "Where Can I Find Love" (Radio Mix) – 3:50
2. "Where Can I Find Love" (Mark!s Hutch Vocal) – 9:07
3. "Where Can I Find Love" (Original Extended Mix) – 5:11
4. "Where Can I Find Love" (Mark!s Anybody Dub) – 9:40
5. "Where Can I Find Love" (G. Piano Mix) – 3:06
6. "Where Can I Find Love" (A-Manetta Club Mix) – 6:06
- Cassette single, UK

A1. "Where Can I Find Love" (Radio Mix) – 3:50
A2. "Where Can I Find Love" (A-Manetta Radio Edit Mix) – 4:18
B1. "Where Can I Find Love" (Radio Mix) – 3:50
B2. "Where Can I Find Love" (A-Manetta Radio Edit Mix) – 4:18

== Charts ==
Chart (1997)	Peak position
Australia (ARIA)	142
Europe (Eurochart Hot 100)	45
Israel (Israeli Singles Chart)	17
Italy (Musica e dischi)	20
Scotland (OCC)	19
UK Singles (Official Charts)	12
UK Dance (OCC)	12
