= S.O.S. (Ola song) =

Single by Ola Svensson

from the album Good Enough
- Released: 2007
- Recorded: 2007
- Genre: Europop; bubblegum pop
- Length: 3:12
- Songwriter(s): Tony Nilsson

Ola Svensson singles chronology
"Du Är Musiken I Mig (with Molly Sandén)" (2007)	"S.O.S." (2007)	"Love in Stereo" (2008)

Music video
- "S.O.S." on YouTube

S.O.S. is a Swedish English language hit by Swedish singer Ola Svensson. It was written by Tony Nilsson and appears on Svensson's second studio album, Good Enough. It also appears on Good Enough - The Feelgood Edition. The hit credited to just Ola was a number one hit on the Swedish Singles Chart on the chart dated 22 November 2007, staying a total of 16 weeks on the chart, including 6 weeks in the Top 5. The single was certified Gold by the IFPI, selling over 10 000 copies.

== Charts ==
Chart (2007)	Peak position
Sweden (Sverigetopplistan)	1
