= Overdrive (Ola song) =

2010 song by Ola

Single by Ola

from the album Ola
- Released: 2010
- Recorded: 2010
- Genre: Pop rock
- Songwriter(s): Dimitri Stassos; Mikaela Stenström; Sharon Vaughn; Ola Svensson
- Producer(s): Stassos

Ola singles chronology
"Unstoppable" (2010)	"Overdrive" (2010)	"All Over the World" (2010)

"Overdrive" is an English language song by Swedish singer Ola, full name Ola Svensson, that reached the top of the Swedish Singles Chart. It was released through Universal Records.

== Charts ==
=== Weekly charts ===
Chart (2010)	Peak position
Sweden (Sverigetopplistan)	1

=== Year-end charts ===
Chart (2010)	Position
Sweden (Sverigetopplistan)	96
