= Love in Stereo (song) =

Single by Ola

from the album Good Enough - The Feelgood Edition
- Released: 2007
- Recorded: 2008
- Genre: Europop
- Length: 3:00
- Songwriter(s): Tony Nilsson; Mirja Breitholtz

Ola singles chronology
"S.O.S." (2007)	"Love in Stereo" (2007)	"Feelgood" (2008)

"Love in Stereo" is a Swedish English language song co-written by Tony Nilsson and Mirja Breitholtz and sung by Swedish singer Ola Svensson during Melodifestivalen in the 2008 series. The song also appears on Good Enough - The Feelgood Edition, the re-release of the singer's sophomore studio album. The song was first performed on 16 February 2008 in Västerås and then in Kiruna in the second chance round, but did not make it to the finals. Although the song did not make it to the finals of Melodifestivalen 2008, it still proved popular on the Swedish Singles Chart, peaking at number two. The single was certified Gold in Sweden, in recognition of 10,000 copies sold.

== Track listing ==
1. Love in Stereo (radio version)
2. Love in Stereo (instrumental version)

== Charts ==
Released on 12 March 2008, the song reached number 2 on charts dated 5 May 2008 and stayed on the chart for a total of 11 weeks, but remained at number two only for one week.

=== Weekly charts ===
Chart (2008)	Peak position
Sweden (Sverigetopplistan)	2

=== Year-end charts ===
Chart (2008)	Position
Sweden (Sverigetopplistan)	42
