= The Queen (Velvet song) =

Single by Velvet

from the album The Queen
- Released: February 23, 2009
- Recorded: 2008
- Genre: Disco-pop
- Length: 2:59
- Label: Bonnier Amigo
- Songwriters: Tony Nilsson, Henrik Janson
- Producers: Tony Nilsson, Henrik Janson

Velvet singles chronology
"Take My Body Close" (2008)	"The Queen" (2009)	"Come Into The Night" (2009)

"The Queen" is a 2009 pop song performed by the Swedish singer Velvet written by Tony Nilsson and Henrik Janson. It competed in the third Semi-Final of the Swedish music competition Melodifestivalen 2009 on February 21, 2009, at the Ejendals Arena, but failed to advance to the Final.

== Track listing ==
1. "The Queen" [Radio Edit] – 2:59
2. "The Queen" [Remix] – 3:38

== Charts ==
The song debuted on the Swedish Singles Chart on the week of March 6, 2009 at number 13, and fell to number 20 the following week before moving up to number 15 in its third week. For weeks four, five and six, the song charted at numbers 32, 42, and 28 respectively. "The Queen" is Velvet's eighth consecutive Top 20 hit in Sweden, and charted for six weeks.

Chart (2009)	Peak position
Sweden (Sverigetopplistan)	13
