= Carelessly Yours =

Studio album by Ola
- Released: 7 January 2014
- Recorded: 2012–2013
- Genre: Pop; dance; Europop; house
- Label: Sony Music Entertainment
- Producer: Ola; Kristofer Östergren; Jon Bordon; Jakke Erixson; Oscar Holter; Rob Elovsson; Flyckt; Emil Gustafsson; G*N*O*M*E; Shellback; John "Kermit" Boback

Ola chronology
Ola (2010)	Carelessly Yours (2014)

Singles from Carelessly Yours
- 1. "I'm in Love" Released: 2012; 2. "Maybe" Released: 2013; 3. "Jackie Kennedy" Released: 2013; 4. "Tonight I'm Yours" Released: 2013; 5. "Rich & Young" Released: 2014

Carelessly Yours is the fourth studio album released by Swedish pop singer Ola.

It was released in Sweden in January 2014, and debuted at number four on the official Swedish Albums Chart. It is Ola's first release through Sony Music Entertainment. It spawned the hit single "I'm in Love", that was a hit for Ola in Italy, his first in that country reaching number four on the Italian Singles Chart. The album subsequently resulted in two minor hits, "Maybe" and "Jackie Kennedy", the latter charting again in Italy.

== Track listing ==
No.	Title	Writer(s)	Producer(s)	Length
1.	"Overture"	Ola Svensson; Kristofer Östergren	Ola; Östergren; Jon Bordon	1:29
2.	"Carelessly Yours"	Svensson; Alexander Kronlund; Dimitri Stassos; Max Grahn; Östergren; Patrik Berger; Johan Schuster	Ola; Östergren; Bordon; Oscar Holter; Rob Elovsson; Jakke Erixson^{[v]}	3:56
3.	"Maybe"	Svensson; Kronlund; Klas Ahlund; Östergren	Ola; Östergren; Bordon; Elovsson; Erixson^{[v]}	4:42
4.	"Losin' It"	Svensson; Rasmus Flyckt; Emil Gustafsson	Flyckt; Gustafsson	2:51
5.	"Human"	Svensson; Östergren; Ulf Lindström; Carl Bjorsell; Harry Simeone; Katherine Kennicott Davis; Henry Onorati	G.N.O.M.E	3:28
6.	"Jackie Kennedy"	Svensson; Kronlund; Schuster; Jakob Hazell; Svante Halldin	Ola; Östergren; Bordon; Holter; Erixson^{[v]}	3:03
7.	"I'm in Love"	Svensson; Mikaela Stenström; Kronlund; Stassos; Schuster; Johan "Kermit" Bobäck	Shellback; Boback	3:20
8.	"Loser"	Svensson; Jakob Erixson; Östergren	Ola; Östergren; Erixson	3:20
9.	"Rich & Young"	Svensson; Kronlund; Adam Baptiste; Östergren	Ola; Östergren; Bordon; Holter^{[a]}	3:28
10.	"They Won't Catch Us Alive"	Svensson; Ana Molina; Sebastian Fronda; Martin Sköld; Östergren; Jonathan Bordon	Ola; Östergren; Bordon	3:14
11.	"One Day"	Svensson; Troy Bonnes; Kronlund; Östergren; Boback	Ola; Östergren; Bordon	3:39
Total length:				36:30

== Charts ==
Chart (2014)	Peak position
Swedish Albums (Sverigetopplistan)	4
