= Brothers (Ola song) =

2006 song by Ola Svensson

Single by Ola

from the album Given to Fly
- Released: 18 September 2006
- Recorded: 2006
- Genre: Pop
- Length: 3:44
- Label: MMS
- Songwriter(s): Jonas Saeed; Pia Sjöberg

Ola singles chronology
"Rain" (2006)	"Brothers" (2006)	"Natalie" (2007)

"Brothers" is the second song released by Swedish singer Ola Svensson. Although the song was promoted as a charity song, it is dedicated partly to Ola's two brothers originally from El Salvador, Jonas and Daniel, who are his elders and were adopted by the Svenssons before Ola was born. The lyrics deal in part with his relationship with his older brothers with the official music video carrying footage of their childhood together. The song was included on his debut album Given to Fly and, following the success of his first single "Rain", managed to peak at number four on the Swedish Singles Chart.

== Chart ==
Chart (2006)	Peak position
Sweden (Sverigetopplistan)	4
