= Rocket (Mohamed Ali song) =

Single by Mohamed Ali

from the album Keep It Simple
- Released: May 2009
- Recorded: 2009
- Genre: Pop; Dance music
- Label: Sony
- Songwriter(s): Thomas Blachman
- Producer(s): GL Music

Mohamed Ali singles chronology
"Rocket" (2009)	"Unbreakable" (2013)

Music video
- "Rocket" on YouTube

"Rocket" is the debut single of Danish singer of Egyptian and Iraqi origin Mohamed Ali taken from his debut and only album Keep It Simple.

He released his single "Rocket" on Sony after coming third in season 2 of the Danish X Factor. The song written by Thomas Blachman and produced by GL Music stayed for 20 weeks in Tracklisten, the official Danish Singles Chart in 2009 peaking at #12 on chart in August 2009.

== Track list ==
The single CD contains:

1. "Rocket" (radio edit)
2. "Rocket" (remix)
3. "Rocket" (Svenstrup & Vendelboe remix)
4. "Rocket" (Svenstrup & Vendelboe remix) [radio edit]

== Chart performance ==
Peak (2009)	Highest position
Denmark (Tracklisten)	12
