= Sky's the Limit (Ola song) =

2009 song by Ola Svensson

Single by Ola
- Released: 2009
- Recorded: 2009
- Genre: Dance-pop; disco
- Label: MMS
- Songwriter(s): Ola Svensson; J-Son; Hamed Pirouzpanah

Ola singles chronology
"Feelgood" (2008)	"Sky's the Limit" (2009)	"Unstoppable" (2010)

"Sky's the Limit" is a Swedish 2009 English language song by Ola Svensson that reached number one on the Swedish Singles Chart on 10 July 2009, where it stayed for one week.

== Charts ==
Chart (2009)	Peak position
Sweden (Sverigetopplistan)	1
