= Rain (Anthony Callea song) =

2005 single by Anthony Callea

Single by Anthony Callea

from the album Anthony Callea
- A-side: "Bridge over Troubled Water"
- B-side: "Don't Tell Me"; "Wanna Be the One"
- Released: 14 March 2005
- Genre: Soft rock
- Label: Sony BMG
- Songwriter(s): Andreas Romdhane; Josef Larossi; Savan Kotecha
- Producer(s): Quiz & Larossi

Anthony Callea singles chronology
"The Prayer" (2004)	"Rain" / "Bridge over Troubled Water" (2005)	"Hurts So Bad" (2005)

Music video
- "Rain" on YouTube

"Rain" is the second song released by Australian Idol series two runner-up Anthony Callea. The song appears on his self-titled debut album, Anthony Callea (2005). It was released as a double A-side with his recording of Simon & Garfunkel's song "Bridge over Troubled Water", which he performed on Australian Idol.

The CD single for the song was released as a three-track standard version with the B-side "Don't Tell Me". It was also available for a short time as a limited edition collector's 2CD tri-gatefold set with a second B-side, "Wanna Be the One". Upon the song's release on 14 March 2005, "Rain" / "Bridge over Troubled Water" became Callea's second number-one single on the Australian Singles Chart

== Track listings ==
Australian CD single

1. "Rain"
2. "Bridge over Troubled Water"
3. "Don't Tell Me"

Australian 2-CD single

1-1. "Rain"
1-2. "Wanna Be the One"
2-1. "Bridge over Troubled Water"
2-2. "Don't Tell Me"

== Charts ==
=== Weekly charts ===
Chart (2005)	Peak position
Australia (ARIA)	1

=== Year-end charts ===
Chart (2005)	Position
Australia (ARIA)	34

== Certifications ==
Region	Certification	Certified units/sales
Australia (ARIA)	2× Platinum	140,000^{^}
^{^} Shipments figures based on certification alone.

== Ola Svensson version ==
"Rain"

Single by Ola Svensson

from the album Given to Fly
- Released: 7 April 2006
- Recorded: 2006
- Genre: Pop
- Length: 3:48
- Label: MMS
- Songwriter(s): Andreas Romdhane; Josef Larossi; Savan Kotecha
- Producer(s): Quiz & Larossi

Ola Svensson singles chronology
"Rain" (2006)	"Brothers" (2006)

In early 2006, Swedish singer Ola Svensson covered the song and released it as his debut single. Following his participation in Idol 2005, the single debuted at number one on the Swedish Singles Chart and remained there for three consecutive weeks.

=== Track listing ===
1. "Rain" – 3:38
2. "Rain" (Instrumental) – 3:47

=== Charts ===
Chart (2006)	Peak position
Sweden (Sverigetopplistan)	1
