= Livin' Joy =

Italian Eurodance group

- Origin: Italy
- Genres: Eurodance; Italo house
- Years active: 1994–1999; 2022–present
- Labels: MCA Records; Universal Music Group
- Members: Tameko Star
- Past members: Janice Robinson; Paolo Visnadi; Gianni Visnadi
- Website: instagram.com/livinjoyofficial

Livin' Joy are an Italian and American Eurodance act that formed in 1994. It primarily consists of American vocalist Tameko Star and previously Italian producers Paolo and Gianni Visnadi.

In 1994, the group debuted with Janice Robinson serving as the group's first American vocalist alongside the Visnadi brothers as producers. They released the single "Dreamer" that year, which became a number one hit on the UK Singles Chart and US Billboard Dance Club Songs chart. In 1995, Robinson departed from the group and was replaced the following year by American singer Tameko Star, with whom Livin' Joy released the album Don't Stop Movin' (1996). The album spawned a string of hit singles for Star, including "Don't Stop Movin'", "Follow the Rules", and "Where Can I Find Love".

== History ==
=== 1994–1995: Janice Robinson and "Dreamer" ===
Livin' Joy was first fronted by American singer Janice Robinson, with the Italian brothers Paolo and Gianni Visnadi providing production. The group released their first single, "Dreamer", through Undiscovered Recordings in 1994. That year, the song reached number 1 on the U.S. Hot Dance Club Play chart. "Dreamer" entered the Billboard Hot 100 in early 1995, peaked at number 72, and spent seventeen weeks on the chart. The song had a more successful run in the United Kingdom, first peaking at number 18 in 1994 and then hitting the number 1 spot after being reissued in 1995. It was later certified platinum in the country. The Visnadi brothers had intended to work further with Robinson, but when she was offered a contract for another song, she rejected the proposal as she felt its terms were unfavorable. Robinson confirmed her departure from the group in April 1995.

=== 1996–1999: Tameko Star and Don't Stop Movin' ===
By 1996, Robinson was replaced by Tameko Star, an American singer, songwriter, and choreographer. With Star on lead vocals, the group released the album Don't Stop Movin' on 28 October 1996. For Don't Stop Movin', a new version of the song "Dreamer" was recorded with Tameko Star on vocals, while the original version with Janice Robinson was included on the album as a hidden track. The album spawned several additional singles, including the title track "Don't Stop Movin'", which peaked at number 5 in the UK in June 1996. It spent 14 weeks on the chart, with 7 of those in the top 10. "Don't Stop Movin'" topped the Italian charts in 1996 and also peaked at number three on the US dance chart in early 1997. In Australia, "Don't Stop Movin'" peaked at number 6 on the national ARIA singles chart. The single was certified gold in both the UK and Australia.

The single "Don't Stop Movin'" was followed by "Follow the Rules" which peaked at number 9 in the UK on 27 October 1996. The single was most successful in Italy, where it peaked at number 2. In 1997, the group released two singles which were moderate hits in the UK: "Where Can I Find Love" peaked at number 12 on the UK charts, while their subsequent single, "Deep in You", peaked at number 17.

In 1999, the group released the single "Just for the Sex of It" in Australia where it peaked at number 76. Outside of the country, it was only released promotionally.

=== 2005–present: Later releases ===
Both Robinson and Star continue to perform and release music. In 2005, Janice Robinson released new remixes of "Dreamer", credited as a solo release. In 2018, Robinson performed "Dreamer" on the British music competition show The X Factor. As a contestant on the show, she finished in 14th place. In 2022, Robinson released a new version of "Dreamer" with DJ Lodato.

In 2022, Star reclaimed the Livin' Joy moniker and announced she would be working on new solo material to be released under her own name. In November 2022, Star released the solo single "Something Beautiful". In 2024 and 2025, Star performed at various gigs including a New Year's Eve show in Dublin, Salford Pride and Bed By 10 Festival alongside tour dates in Bath and Leicester as part of Originals Live. In early 2026, Star performed in Toronto and toured around Australia with Bed By 10.

== Discography ==
=== Studio albums ===
Title	Album details	Peak chart positions
Title	Album details	UK
Don't Stop Movin'	Released: October 1996; Label: Undiscovered Records	41

=== Singles ===
Year	Title	Peak chart positions											Certifications	Album
Year	Title	ITA	AUS	BEL	FIN	GER	IRE	NED	SWE	UK	US	US Dance	Certifications	Album
1994	"Dreamer"	—	—	—	—	—	—	23	—	18	—	1		Don't Stop Movin'
1995	"Dreamer" (reissue)	—	90	—	10	87	7	36	—	1	72	—	BPI: 2× Platinum	Don't Stop Movin'
1996	"Don't Stop Movin'"	1	6	36	7	—	14	19	8	5	67	3	AUS: Gold; BPI: Platinum	Don't Stop Movin'
1996	"Follow the Rules"	2	73	—	12	—	28	—	29	9	—	—		Don't Stop Movin'
1997	"Where Can I Find Love"	22	142	—	—	—	—	—	—	12	—	—		Don't Stop Movin'
1997	"Deep in You"	—	—	—	—	—	—	—	—	17	—	—		Don't Stop Movin'
1999	"Just for the Sex of It"	—	76	—	—	—	—	—	—	—	—	—		Non-album single
"—" denotes items that did not chart or were not released in that territory.

== See also ==
- List of Billboard number-one dance club songs
- List of artists who reached number one on the U.S. Dance Club Songs chart
- List of artists who reached number one on the UK Singles Chart
