= Don't Stop Movin' (Livin' Joy album) =

Studio album by Livin' Joy
- Released: 28 October 1996
- Genres: Electronic; house; trip hop; R&B
- Length: 51:01
- Labels: Undiscovered Records; MCA Records
- Producers: Gianni Visnadi; Paolo Visnadi; Tameko Star

Singles from Don't Stop Movin'
- 1. "Dreamer" Released: 22 August 1994; 2. "Don't Stop Movin'" Released: 6 June 1996; 3. "Follow the Rules" Released: 14 October 1996; 4. "Where Can I Find Love" Released: 24 March 1997; 5. "Deep in You" Released: 11 August 1997

Don't Stop Movin' is the debut album by the Italian electronic music group Livin' Joy, released on 28 October 1996. The album's first single, "Dreamer", was released in 1994 and features Janice Robinson on lead vocals. The song peaked at number one on the UK Singles Chart and US Dance chart.

Following the release of "Dreamer", Janice Robinson left the group, and was replaced by new lead vocalist Tameko Star. With Star, the group released several additional singles, including the title track "Don't Stop Movin'", which peaked at number 5 on the UK Singles Chart and spent seven weeks in the top 10. Further singles were "Follow the Rules", "Where Can I Find Love", and "Deep in You". The Don't Stop Movin' album also includes a new version of "Dreamer" with Star on vocals.

Don't Stop Movin' album received generally mixed reviews from music critics. However, the album only charted on the UK Albums Chart for two weeks, peaking at number 41.

== Background ==
Livin' Joy was first fronted by American singer Janice Robinson, with the Italian brothers Paolo and Gianni Visnadi providing production. The group released their first single, "Dreamer" in 1994. Following the release of "Dreamer", Janice Robinson left the group, and was replaced by new lead vocalist Tameko Star in 1996. With Star, the group quickly recorded Don't Stop Movin' and the album was completed in less than a month.

== Singles ==
The group's first single, "Dreamer", was released through Undiscovered Recordings in 1994. That year, the song reached number 1 on the U.S. Hot Dance Club Play chart. "Dreamer" entered the Billboard Hot 100 in early 1995, peaked at number 72, and spent seventeen weeks on the chart. The song had a more successful run in the United Kingdom, first peaking at number 18 in 1994 and then hitting the number 1 spot after being reissued in 1995. It was later certified platinum in the country.

The album spawned several additional singles, including the title track "Don't Stop Movin'", which peaked at number 5 in the UK in June 1996. It spent 14 weeks on the chart, with 7 of those in the top 10. "Don't Stop Movin'" topped the Italian charts in 1996 and also peaked at number three on the US dance chart in early 1997. In Australia, "Don't Stop Movin'" peaked at number 6 on the ARIA singles chart. The single was certified gold in both the UK and Australia.

"Don't Stop Movin'" was followed by "Follow the Rules" which peaked at number 9 in the UK on 27 October 1996. The single was most successful in Italy, where it peaked at number 2. In 1997, the group released two singles which were moderate hits in the UK. The first, "Where Can I Find Love" peaked at number 12 on the UK charts. Their subsequent single, "Deep in You", was promoted with a remix by Cutfather & Joe and peaked at number 17.

The group's final release was "Just for the Sex of It", released as a standalone single in 1999. In Australia, it peaked at number 76. The song was subsequently included as a bonus track on the 2018 digital reissue of Don't Stop Movin'.

== Critical reception ==
Professional ratings
Review scores
Source	Rating
AllMusic	2.5/5 stars
The Encyclopedia of Popular Music	3/5 stars
Music Week	3/5 stars

Don't Stop Movin' received generally mixed reviews from music critics. AllMusic editor Jason Ankeny noted that the album has "a sound which owes an equal debt to Euro-dance music and underground house." Melody Maker said, "Yes! Yes! Yes!" A reviewer from Music Week wrote, "The Italian and American trio unleash a mixture of powerful party anthems and more subtle dancefloor delights. Uplifting stuff." In a mixed review, Toni Birghental of the Sun-Sentinel felt the album consisting of "almost entirely fast-paced dance music" would be "great motivation for aerobics fans". However, Birghental criticized the album for not having a diverse sound.

== Track listing ==
All tracks are produced by Gianni Visnadi and Paolo Visnadi, except where noted.

All tracks are written by Tameko Star, Gianni Visnadi, and Paolo Visnadi, except where noted.

Don't Stop Movin' – Standard edition
No.	Title	Writer(s)	Length
1.	"Don't Stop Movin'"		5:17
2.	"Follow the Rules"		3:51
3.	"Deep in You"		4:29
4.	"Dreamer"	Janice Robinson; Gianni Visnadi; Paolo Visnadi	5:45
5.	"Pick up the Phone"		4:28
6.	"Be Original"		4:34
7.	"Where Can I Find Love"		3:34
8.	"Don't Cha Wanna"		4:21
9.	"Whenever You're Lonely"		4:22
10.	"Let Me Love You"		4:14
11.	"Don't Stop Movin'" (A. Manetta mix)		5:46
Total length:			51:01

2018 digital reissue bonus tracks
No.	Title	Writer(s)	Producer(s)	Length
12.	"Dreamer" (Janice Robinson vocal)	Robinson; G. Visnadi; P. Visnadi		3:44
13.	"Don't Stop Movin'" (Radio mix)			3:35
14.	"Follow the Rules" (Radio mix)			3:17
15.	"Deep in You" (Cutfather & Joe remix)		G. Visnadi; P. Visnadi; Cutfather & Joe^{[a]}	3:44
16.	"Just for the Sex of It" (Radio mix)			3:53
Total length:				70:00

Notes

- ^{^[a]} signifies a remixer.
- The version of "Dreamer" included on Don't Stop Movin' as track 4 is a new version with vocals by Tameko Star. The original song with vocals by Janice Robinson was included on CD releases of the album as a hidden bonus track, which played as part of track 11 following four minutes of silence. The Robinson version was included as a separate track 12 on the 2018 digital reissue of the album.

== Charts ==
Chart	Peak position
UK Albums Chart	41
