= Keep It Simple (Mohamed Ali album) =

Studio album by Mohamed Ali
- Released: 2009
- Label: Sony

Singles from Keep It Simple
- 1. "Rocket" Released: 2009

Keep It Simple is the debut and only studio album by Danish singer of Egyptian and Iraqi origin, Mohamed Ali, after he came third in season 2 of the Danish X Factor. The album reached No. 2 on the Danish Albums Chart.

The single "Rocket" taken from the album became Mohamed Ali's debut solo single from the album reaching No. 12 on the Tracklisten, the official Danish Singles Chart.

== Track listing ==
1. "Rocket" (3:51)
2. "Keep It Simple" (3:50)
3. "Attention" (3:54)
4. "Holla!" (3:00)
5. "Satellite" (3:43)
6. "In My Head" (3:54)
7. "You Don't Even Know" (4:17)
8. "So Serious" (3:28)
9. "Raindrops" (4:23)
10. "Phenomenon" (3:03)
11. "Me and the Rain" (3:42)
12. "Ground Control" (2:17)
