= Ola (album) =

Studio album by Ola
- Released: 15 September 2010
- Recorded: 2010
- Genre: Pop
- Label: Oliniho Records

Ola chronology
Good Enough (2008)	Ola (2010)	Carelessly Yours (2014)

Singles from Ola
- 1. "Unstoppable" Released: 28 February 2010; 2. "Overdrive" Released: 23 July 2010; 3. "All Over the World" Released: 3 November 2010; 4. "Riot" Released: 22 June 2011

Ola is the third studio album released by Swedish pop singer Ola.

The self-titled studio album Ola was released in Sweden in September 2010, and debuted at number three on the Swedish Albums Chart. It is the first release on Ola's own label Oliniho Records, after buying himself out of his deal with Universal Music. It spawned three hit singles, "Unstoppable", "Overdrive" and "All Over The World", which was Ola's first international single release. The similarity between "All Over The World" and "Somebody To Love" by Justin Bieber is often noted, but believed to be coincidence, as the two were released at the same time.

The album also contained the bonus track "Let It Hit You", composed by Ola with regular collaborator Alexander Kronlund and British artist Labrinth.

== Track listing ==
1. "All Over the World" (3:53)
2. "Unstoppable (The Return of Natalie)" (3:01)
3. "You're That Girl (YTG)" 3:23)
4. "Riot" (3:22)
5. "Overdrive" (3:39)
6. "Beautiful Rain" (3:49)
7. "Busy Doing Nothing" (3:40)
8. "Still Remember" (3:45)
9. "Let It Hit You" (3:36)
10. "Twisted Memories" (4:34)

== Charts ==
Chart (2010)	Peak position
Swedish Albums (Sverigetopplistan)	3
