= Janice Robinson =

American singer

- Born: December 8, 1967 (age 58); Garfield, New Jersey, U.S.
- Origin: United States
- Genres: House, R&B, pop
- Years active: 1992–present
- Labels: Warner Bros. Records (1992–2006), Spinnin Records, (2022), Warner Records (2022)

Janice Robinson (born December 8, 1967) is an American singer and songwriter. She is known for being a member of the 1990s Eurodance group Livin' Joy with whom she released the global dance hit "Dreamer" in 1994. She departed from the group following its release and embarked on a solo career, releasing her debut album The Color Within Me in 1999.

== Career ==
Robinson toured as a vocalist for euro-dance group Snap! in 1990–1991, replacing studio vocalist Penny Ford in the group’s live shows. In the mid-1990s, Robinson began working with the Italian producers Paolo and Gianni Visnadi. Together, they formed the eurodance group Livin' Joy and received worldwide success with their debut 1994 single "Dreamer". The single topped the charts in the United Kingdom and peaked within the top ten of the charts in several other European countries. It has since been certified platinum, selling more than 600,000 copies in the United Kingdom alone. Robinson departed from the group in April 1995 and was replaced with vocalist Tameko Star in 1996.

In 1998, her song "Earthbeat" was included on the compilation Pride 1998. Robinson's subsequent solo debut album The Color Within Me was released in 1999 and featured the single "Nothing I Would Change". In 2000, Robinson performed on the drama Charmed, in the episode "Animal Pragmatism". In 2000, she toured America as an opening act for Tina Turner's U.S. leg of her world tour alongside Lionel Richie. Turner picked Robinson to open for her after hearing her album The Color Within Me. In 2005, Robinson released several remixes of "Dreamer" under her own name. The release, dubbed "Dreamer '05", featured the song's original vocals.

In 2015, Robinson released "There Must Be Love" in collaboration with David Morales; the track topped the Billboard Dance Charts. In 2017, she released the single "Father".

In 2018, Robinson returned to the stage on The X Factor in the United Kingdom as a contestant surprising the judging panel with the revelation that she was the voice and songwriter behind the international dance track "Dreamer". She successfully made it to the live shows as part of the Over 29s category mentored by Ayda Field and was the third contestant eliminated.

In 2019, Robinson spent the spring and summer touring the UK and abroad. On August 1, she released a new single titled "Freedom", teaming up with DJ David Morales once again.

In 2021, Robinson continued working on a documentary about her life, alongside performing across the UK and abroad.

In 2022, Robinson announced that she was continuing to work on her documentary about her life story. On 8 January, she announced on BBC Radio 2 that new music is in the works. The first single called "Essex Girls" with British rappers who used the verse of "Dreamer" was released in January on Warner Records and a brand new version of "Dreamer" was released in February 2022 with DJ Salvatore Lodato on Spinnin Records. Robinson said she was "excited to reach a whole new generation" of fans who love her music. She also released "Love Comes Once in Your Life" with OMG Collective. In July 2023, she teamed up with OMG Collective once again with ‘Just A Little Love’. Robinson has toured alongside Ministry Of Sound Classical at sold out shows across the UK from 2019-2024, including multiple sold out shows at Royal Albert Hall in London. In 2026, Robinson re-imagined Dreamer for a whole new generation, after the original track went viral on TikTok with the Lioness Trend. Robinson also performed at shows in Preston and Leeds to promote the record.

== Personal life ==
Robinson was born in Garfield, New Jersey. She has two daughters.

== Songwriting discography ==
Abigail - Home...Again

- 11. "Let the Joy Rise"

Ashley Tisdale - Headstrong

- 14. "Suddenly"

Brahim - Evolution

- 02. "So into You"

Hania Stach

- 00. "Regroup"

Kristine W - Stronger

- 09. "Let Love Reign"

Lucas Prata - Let's Get It On

- 04. "Love of My Life"
- 13. "Feel the Love Again"

Natalia - Back For More

- 02. "Risin"

Reina - This Is Reina

- 01. "If I Close My Eyes"
- 05. "On My Own"

Ricki-Lee Coulter - Brand New Day

- 03. "Melody of Life"
- 12. "I Appreciate You"

Sandrine Van Handenhoven - Story of Us (Movie)

- 00. "Story of Us"

Taylor Dayne - Satisfied

- 09. "Crash"

Taylor Dayne - Naked without You

- 02. "Whenever You Fall"

Tevin Campbell - Tevin Campbell

- 02. "Never Again"

VFactory - These Are the Days EP

- 03. "These Are the Days"

== Singles ==
Year	Title	Album	US	US Dance
1999	"Nothing I Would Change"	The Color Within Me	–	–
1998	"Earthbeat"	Pride 1998	–	–
2005	"Dreamer '05"	Dreamer EP	–	5

=== Other singles ===
Year	Title	US	US Dance
2015	"There Must Be Love" (with David Morales)	–	1
2022	"Love Comes Once In Your Life" (with OMG Collective)	–	
2023	"Just A Little Love" (with OMG Collective)	–	

=== As Livin Joy ===
Year	Title	Peak chart positions											Certifications	Album
Year	Title	ITA	AUS	BEL	FIN	GER	IRE	NED	SWE	UK	US	US Dance	Certifications	Album
1994	"Dreamer"	—	—	—	—	—	—	23	—	18	—	1		Don't Stop Movin'
1995	"Dreamer" (re-issue)	—	90	—	10	87	7	36	—	1	72	—	BPI: Platinum	Don't Stop Movin'
"—" denotes items that did not chart or were not released in that territory.

== Tours ==
•Snap! - World Tour (Live vocalist - 1990-91)

• Tina Turner - Twenty Four Seven Tour (opening act on North American leg - 2000)

• Ministry Of Sound Classical (Guest vocalist - United Kingdom - 2019–2024)

== See also ==
- List of artists who reached number one on the US Dance chart
