= Dreamer (Livin' Joy song) =

1994 single by Livin' Joy

- 1995 reissue

Single by Livin' Joy

from the album Don't Stop Movin'
- Released: 22 August 1994
- Genre: Eurodance; house; Italo house; techno
- Length: 3:40 (1994 radio mix); 3:44 (1995 re-release 7-inch mix); 5:45 (1996 album version)
- Label: MCA
- Songwriters: Janice Robinson; Gianni Visnadi; Paolo Visnadi
- Producers: Paolo Visnadi; Gianni Visnadi

Livin' Joy singles chronology
"Dreamer" (1994)	"Don't Stop Movin'" (1996)

Music video
- "Dreamer" on YouTube

"Dreamer" is a song by Italian house group Livin' Joy, written and recorded by American singer Janice Robinson and produced by brothers Paolo and Gianni Visnadi. Originally released in August 1994, it was re-released in 1995 by MCA Records and topped the UK Singles Chart at the number one spot that May, ending 1995 as the UK's 40th-biggest-selling single of that year. In the United States, it went to number-one on the Billboard Hot Dance Club Play chart. It was a sleeper hit on pop radio, but finally managed to peak at number 72 on the Billboard Hot 100 and number 75 on the Cash Box Top 100. Upon its release, "Dreamer" was acclaimed by music critics, many of whom praised Robinson's vocals on the song. Two different music videos were produced to promote the single; in 1994 and 1995.

When the group was unable to reach a deal with Robinson for a follow-up single she was replaced by American singer Tameko Star. A new version of "Dreamer" with Star on vocals was recorded for the Livin' Joy album Don't Stop Movin' (1996), while the original recording with Robinson on vocals was included as a hidden track. In 2005, Robinson released her own version of "Dreamer" as a solo artist, reaching number five in the US Dance chart. In 2018, Robinson auditioned for the fifteenth series of The X Factor, singing "Dreamer" as her performance song 24 years after its original release in 1994. MTV Dance ranked "Dreamer" number 15 in their list of "The 100 Biggest 90's Dance Anthems of All Time" in November 2011.

== Background and release ==
Janice Robinson grew up in Garfield, New Jersey with a father who was a Baptist church preacher, and used to sing in church at a young age. In the beginning of the 1990s, she toured with New Kids On The Block and as the vocalist for German Eurodance project Snap!, replacing studio vocalist Penny Ford in the group's live shows. Robinson moved to Italy and through her boyfriend, she came in contact with DJ Gianluca Venturi who worked at a club called Joia. He played her "Show Me Love" by Robin S. and told her that they wanted to do something like this. She was handed a cassette with the piano music of "Dreamer" and introduced to the producers, the Visnadi brothers. The lyrics were written on a train in Milan.

Robinson listened to the piano track on a little yellow Sony Walkman and came up with the first words, Love, life and laughter. The same day she went into studio and was there for 25 minutes. Robinson told DJ Mag in 2024, "I sang it down. I had my paper, I had my Sony Walkman. I listened back, and then I sang it once, and then I doubled it and I said, 'Okay, guys, call me if it happens.'" Robinson went back to New York and one year later the song was signed to MCA Records. A&R at MCA, Steve Wolff, called Robinson and told her that they had her song and wanted to do a record deal with her. A music video was shot and after "Dreamer" was re-released in 1995, Robinson performed at the Top of the Pops in the UK, wearing a Vivienne Westwood corset.

== Chart performance ==
The song was first released in the United Kingdom on 22 August 1994, debuting at number 18 in the UK Singles Chart. It descended the charts shortly afterwards, falling to number 67, then exiting the top 100 the following week. On 22 October 1994, it returned to the UK chart at number 85 before falling to number 97 and then exiting the top 100 once more. The record again re-entered the UK top 100 in November 1994, at number 99. The following week, it climbed to number 85 before descending one final time to number 97 before it bowed out. However, on 7 May 1995, "Dreamer" returned to the chart, reappearing at number one. It also reached the top position on the RM Club Chart from British magazine Music Week.

In Europe, the single was a top-10 hit in Finland and Ireland as well as on the Eurochart Hot 100, where it reached number six in May 1995. It entered the top 30 in the Netherlands and the top 90 in Germany. Outside Europe, the single peaked at number one on the US Billboard Hot Dance Club Play chart and number three on the RPM Dance chart in Canada. In Oceania, it reached number 90 on the ARIA singles chart in Australia. In West Asia, it became a top-30 hit in Israel, peaking at number 26 on 16 May 1995. In the US, "Dreamer" also peaked at number 72 on the Billboard Hot 100, number 75 on the Cash Box Top 100, number 38 on the Billboard Top 40/Rhythm Crossover chart, and number 10 on the Billboard Maxi-Singles Sales listing. In mid-1996, "Dreamer" re-entered the Billboard Hot 100, reaching number 95.

== Critical reception ==
Scottish Aberdeen Press and Journal complimented "Dreamer" as a "unforgettable summer stunner". Larry Flick from Billboard magazine remarked that Livin' Joy "weaves an irresistible fabric of vibrant house rhythms, blippy electro synth sounds, and fluttering diva vocal loops". He added, "The real beauty of this record is Janice Robinson's divine, lung-bursting vocal." Howard Cohen from Knight-Ridder Newspapers complimented its "strong melody with punchy keyboards." Simon Price from Melody Maker described it as "outrageously dramatic" and named it one of the "two most precious moments of the Pop Year '95" alongside "Let Me Be Your Fantasy" by Baby D, as they both reached the number one position on the UK Singles Chart that year. Andy Beevers from Music Week gave "Dreamer" a score of four out of five, stating that "this happy house tune from Italy is bound to be a big club hit and its catchy female vocal should help it to cross over". On the 1995 re-release, Music Week gave it four out of five, praising it as "the club anthem that gets everyone dancing round their handbags."

Iestyn George from NME named "Dreamer" "the house anthem of '94" and an "organ-fuelled screamathon". He concluded, "It will be Number One for the requisite 17 weeks, like it or not." Another NME editor, Angela Lewis, complimented it as a "hedonistic headcharge of feel-good techno. The drip-drip luscious vocals are sweet enough to be a substitute for the granulated sugar stuff you put in your tea in the morning, while the rave-till-you're-completely-zonked throbbings have probably caused bonfire high mountains of handbags on dancefloors recently." James Hamilton from the Record Mirror Dance Update declared it as an "maddeningly jaunty Italo pop bounder" in his weekly dance column. Stephen Meade from The Network Forty noted: "True dance music for crossover radio is no easy trick; Livin' Joy has a story being told in the clubs. It's time for radio to embrace another hit record." Mark Frith from Smash Hits gave "Dreamer" a full score of five out of five, writing, "A massive house tune with fantastic vocals, this is a complete classic because it has got so many good bits and is just so contagiously happy and up. Irresistible. Play this ulta-loud and I dare you not to wave your hands in the air." In 1996, Dave Sholin from the Gavin Report felt the track deserved more support from American radio, despite its European success.

=== Retrospective response ===
In a 2013 retrospective review, Tom Ewing of Freaky Trigger gave the song nine out of ten, saying the song's chorus "is a concentrated blurt of fierce hope, a fantasy of togetherness so intense but so impossible that Robinson takes it in double-time, like she's trying to grab a moment – or a dream – before it vanishes. The song slinks and builds up to that point, its loping bass and keyboard figures giving Robinson space to stretch out a bit and approach lines like 'Love, life and laughter is all I believe' with the lived-in relish they deserve." He explained that it "condense[s] all the hopes, fears, desperation, and fantasies that a dancefloor magics into being, leaving an intense hit of pop that stays in your mind long after the night ends." In 2015, John Hamilton from Idolator called it the "giddy little sister" of Robin S's "Show Me Love", describing it as "ebullient". He added that "the jumbo-sized synth bloops and hyper, screeching organ" and "the rip-roaring chorus of 'Dreamer' was guaranteed to stick in heads and make fools of amateur lip-syncers."

== Style ==
An example of Italo house and Eurodance, the song is said to blend elements from different electronic genres. Tom Ewing of Freaky Trigger explained, "The bumping, cut-up rhythms and vocals that begin the remixed 'Dreamer' [that was a hit] feel like garage, for example, but as Janice Robinson takes the song into its urgently blissful chorus I want to call it house – or even go more specific and say handbag house, that showy, uplifting offshoot that strutted across superclub dancefloors in the mid-90s."

== Music video ==
There are three versions of the music video for "Dreamer". The first video, for the 1994 version, was directed by Tom Laurie, produced by Juliet Naylor for Conspiracy and released on 15 August 1994. It features surreal split-screen footage of urban landscapes enhanced by time lapse photography and has a silhouetted female dancer.

For its 1995 re-release, a new video was produced with Robinson's participation. She is shown performing the song in various scenes, including on a carousel horse, on a brass bed, and in font of a silver foiled background. She is seen in various wigs and costumes throughout the video. Several shots go from colour to black and white; also intercut are dancers/models acting out seductive poses, with one model taking a shower fully clothed and another holding a chihuahua. The third version is from the same 1995 re-release video shoot with the 7-inch edit version with alternative edited scenes. The video of "Dreamer" was a Box Top on British music television channel The Box from February 1995.

== Impact and legacy ==
In 1995, American DJ George Morel named "Dreamer" one of his "classic cuts", saying, "This is like Robin S but even more pumped up. It's better produced and the vocalist Janice Robinson is amazing." In 2011, MTV Dance ranked the song number 15 in their list of "The 100 Biggest 90's Dance Anthems of All Time". In 2015, Idolator ranked it number 17 in their list of "The 50 Best Pop Singles of 1995". In 2017, BuzzFeed ranked it number 74 in their list of "The 101 Greatest Dance Songs of the '90s", writing, "Female vocals set to a house beat = everything you could want from an early-'90s dance song."

== Track listings ==
- 1994 UK CD single
1. "Dreamer" (Radio Mix) 3:40
2. "Dreamer" (2" Deep Pan Mix) 5:36
3. "Dreamer" (Original Mix) 5:39
4. "Dreamer" (Slo Moshun Mix) 10:48
5. "Dreamer" (Luvdup Mix) 5:08
6. "Dreamer" (Swing 52 Dub) 7:51
- 1994 US CD single
1. "Dreamer" (Original Club Mix) 5:37
2. "Dreamer" (Slo Moshun Mix) 10:37
3. "Dreamer" (Junior's Sound Factory Mix) 9:47
4. "Dreamer" (Factory Dub) 7:05
5. "Dreamer" (Junior Vasquez Sound Factory Instrumental) 9:44
6. "Dreamer" (Radio Mix) 3:38
- 1995 UK re-release CD
1. "Dreamer" (7-inch Mix) 3:44
2. "Dreamer" (Original Club Mix) 5:39
3. "Dreamer" (Rollo Armstrong Big Mix) 8:36
4. "Dreamer" (Loveland's Viva Tenerife Mix) 6:53
5. "Dreamer" (Junior Vasquez Sound Factory Mix) 8:56
6. "Dreamer" (Jupiter 12-inch Collision Mix) 6:01

== Charts ==
=== Weekly charts ===
Chart (1994)	Peak position
Europe (Eurochart Hot 100 Singles)	67
Netherlands (Dutch Top 40)	25
Netherlands (Single Top 100)	23
Scotland (OCC)	42
UK Singles (OCC)	18
UK Dance (Official Charts)	1
UK Club Chart (Music Week)	6
US Dance Club Play (Billboard)	1

Chart (1995)	Peak position
Australia (ARIA)	90
Canada Dance/Urban (RPM)	3
Europe (Eurochart Hot 100 Singles)	6
Europe (European Dance Radio)	10
Finland (Suomen virallinen lista)	10
Germany (GfK)	87
Ireland (IRMA)	7
Israel (Israeli Singles Chart)	26
Scottish Singles Sales (Official Charts)	3
UK Singles (Official Charts)	1
UK Dance (Official Charts)	1
UK Airplay (Music Week)	2
UK Club Chart (Music Week)	1
UK Pop Tip Club Chart (Music Week)	1
US Billboard Hot 100	72
US Maxi-Singles Sales (Billboard)	10
US Top 40/Rhythm-Crossover (Billboard)	38
US Cash Box Top 100	75

=== Year-end charts ===
Chart (1994)	Position
UK Singles (OCC)	162
UK Club Chart (Music Week)	65
US Dance Club Play (Billboard)	45

Chart (1995)	Position
Canada Dance/Urban (RPM)	32
UK Singles (OCC)	40
UK Airplay (Music Week)	32
UK Club Chart (Music Week)	30
UK Pop Tip Club Chart (Music Week)	8
US Maxi-Singles Sales (Billboard)	50

== Certifications ==
Region	Certification	Certified units/sales
United Kingdom (BPI)	2× Platinum	1,200,000^{‡}
^{‡} Sales+streaming figures based on certification alone.

== Janice Robinson solo version ==
=== Track listings ===
- 2005 CD, maxi-single
1. "Dreamer" (ReMixed) (Jack D. Elliot Rebirth club mix) – 6:27
2. "Dreamer" (ReMixed) (Xenon's mix) – 7:00
3. "Dreamer" (ReMixed) (Jamie J Sanchez club mix) – 7:37
4. "Dreamer" (ReMixed) (Livewater Futuristic club vocal) – 8:56
5. "Dreamer" (ReMixed) (Twisted Dee club mix) – 8:21
- 2006 5× File, MP3
1. "Dreamer" (ReMixed) (Joe Bermudez & Klubjumpers Nocternal Emissions club mix) – 8:46
2. "Dreamer" (ReMixed) (Nic Mercy's Epic Anthem) – 9:30
3. "Dreamer" (ReMixed) (John Farruggio's club mix) – 9:27
4. "Dreamer" (ReMixed) (Radboy's Rockin' mix) – 7:44
5. "Dreamer" (ReMixed) (Dancin' Divaz club mix) – 7:34
- 2022 1x file, MP3
1. "Dreamer" – LODATO and Janice Robinson – Dreamer (New Version)

== Matt Helders version ==
A cover version of the song by Arctic Monkeys drummer Matt Helders was released on his Late Night Tales compilation in 2008. This version features vocals from Nesreen Shah. It was also released as a 7-inch vinyl single limited to 1000 copies. Arctic Monkeys lead singer Alex Turner's spoken word story "A Choice Of Three" appears as a b-side.

== See also ==
- List of number-one dance singles of 1994 (U.S.)
