= Given to Fly (album) =

Studio album by Ola
- Released: 12 June 2006
- Recorded: 2006
- Genre: Pop
- Length: 41:13
- Label: mms records

Ola chronology
Given to Fly (2006)	Good Enough (2007)

Singles from Given to Fly
- 1. "Rain" Released: 7 April 2006; 2. "Brothers" Released: 18 September 2006

Given to Fly is the debut studio album by Swedish pop singer Ola. It was released in June 2006 and debuted at number one on the Swedish Albums Chart.

== Track listing ==
1. "Rain" (3:47)
  - Backing Vocals – Emil Heiling
  - Guitar – Esbjörn Öhrwall, Johan Lindman
  - Producer – Jonas Saeed
  - Mixed By – Fredrik Andersson, Jonas Saeed
  - Piano – Pontus Söderqvist
  - Written-By – Andreas Romdhane, Josef Larossi, Savan
1. "Cops Come Knocking" (3:42)
2. "How We Do It" (3:53)
3. "Given to Fly" (4:03)
4. "Till the End" (3:21)
5. "Everything I Am" (4:10)
6. "Invincible" (3:30)
7. "My Home" (3:23)
8. "I Could Be Him" (3:31)
9. "Time to Let You Go" (3:43)
10. "Brothers" (3:47)
11. "Go Go Sweden" (3:32)

== Charts ==
Chart (2006)	Peak position
Swedish Albums (Sverigetopplistan)	1
