= Unstoppable (Ola song) =

"Unstoppable (The Return of Natalie)"

Single by Ola

from the album Ola
- Released: 28 February 2010
- Recorded: 2010
- Genre: Europop
- Songwriters: Dimitri Stassos; Alexander Kronlund; Hanif Sabzevari; Ola Svensson
- Producer: Oscar Görres

Ola singles chronology
"Sky's the Limit" (2009)	"Unstoppable (The Return of Natalie)" (2010)	"Overdrive" (2010)

Unstoppable, full title "Unstoppable (The Return of Natalie)" is a Swedish English language hit sung by the Swedish singer Ola Svensson and was recorded in 2010. Lyrics and music were written by Dimitri Stassos, Alexander Kronlund, Hanif Sabzevari and Svensson himself. Svensson participated in the Swedish Melodifestivalen 2010 with "Unstoppable" and finished first in the first semi-final in Örnsköldsvik on 6 February 2010. The song was qualified for the final in Stockholm. Svensson took part in the Melodifestivalen final on Saturday, 13 March 2010 at Globe Arena in Stockholm, in a bid to represent Sweden in Eurovision Song Contest 2010, held in Oslo, Norway. He came at 7th place overall with a total of 47 points, but receiving two sets of 12 points from the Serbian & Irish juries.

The song reached number one on the Swedish Singles Chart.

== Charts ==
=== Weekly charts ===
Chart (2010)	Peak position
Sweden (Sverigetopplistan)	1

=== Year-end charts ===
Chart (2010)	Position
Sweden (Sverigetopplistan)	40
