= Tony Nilsson =

Swedish singer-songwriter

Tony Nilsson is a Swedish singer-songwriter (born in Boden, Norrbotten County, Sweden in 1977). He is signed to Peermusic. A prolific composer of songs, he has contributed to a string of hits by well-known Swedish artists. Many of his songs have featured in Melodifestivalen and in the Swedish Singles Chart. Nilsson lives with artist and fellow songwriter Mirja Breitholtz.

Nilsson had a hit with "Natalie", a song he had written. It was featured in 2006 in the compilation album Absolute Summerhits 2006. In 2007, a cover version by Ola Svensson became a huge summer hit in Sweden.

In 2010 he wrote the song "If You Love Me", which was recorded and released by British X Factor winner Joe McElderry. The same year Nilsson started collaborating with Swedish singer Darin. Together they wrote "Can't Stop Love" for the Swedish royal wedding and most of the other songs on Darin's album Lovekiller. The album went straight to No. 1 in the charts and was certified gold after only one week.

== Discography ==
=== Songs in Melodifestivalen ===
2008:

- "Love in Stereo" by Ola Svensson (co-written with Mirja Breitholtz), Round 2 of Andra Chansen

2009:

- "Disconnect Me" by Marie Serneholt (co-written with Peter Boström), 6th place (Semi-final)
- "The Queen" by Velvet (Jenny Pettersson) (co-written with Henrik Jansson), 6th place (Semi-final)

2010:

- "Doctor Doctor" by Elin Lanto (co-written with Mirja Breitholtz), 7th place (Semi-final)
- "The Saviour" by Anders Ekborg (co-written with Henrik Jansson), 6th place (Semi-final)
- "Headlines" by Alcazar (co-written with Peter Boström), Round 1 of Andra Chansen
- "You're Out of My Life" by Darin Zanyar (co-written with Henrik Jansson), 4th place

2011:

- "Like Suicide" by Christian Walz (co-written with Fernando Fuentes and Henrik Jansson), 5th place (Semi-final)

2012:

- "Goosebumps" by Hanna Lindblad (co-written with Hanna Lindblad and Linda Sundblad), 7th place (Semi-final)
- "Shout It Out" by David Lindgren (co-written with Fernando Fuentes), 4th place

=== Other songs ===
- 2007: "Natalie" by Ola Svensson
- 2007: "S.O.S." by Ola Svensson
- 2010: "If You Love Me" by Joe McElderry (b-side to Ambitions single)
- 2010: "Lovekiller" by Darin
- 2010: "Microphone" by Darin
- 2010: "Can't Stop Love" by Darin
- 2011: "Hit the Lights " by Selena Gomez & The Scene
- 2011: "DNA" by Aynur Aydın
- 2012: "Loaded" by Agnes
- 2012: "Human Touch" by Agnes
- 2012: "Watching It Burn" by Agnes
- 2012: "Like God" by Agnes
- 2012: "Better than You" (feat. Rita Ora) by Conor Maynard
- 2012: "Headphones" by Conor Maynard
- 2012: "Nobody Knows" by Darin
- 2012: "Perfect Crime" by David Lindgren
- 2012: "Encore" by David Lindgren
- 2013: "Intro" by David Lindgren
- 2013: "Move That Thing" by David Lindgren
- 2013: "Back 2 Life" by David Lindgren
- 2013: "Ignite" by David Lindgren
- 2013: "Armagedon" by David Lindgren
- 2013: "Requiem" by Ulrik Munther
