= Sweden in the Eurovision Song Contest 2015 =

- Eurovision Song Contest 2015
- Participating broadcaster: Sveriges Television (SVT)
- Country: Sweden
- Selection process: Melodifestivalen 2015
- Selection date: 14 March 2015

Competing entry
- Song: "Heroes"
- Artist: Måns Zelmerlöw
- Songwriters: Linnea Deb; Joy Deb; Anton Malmberg Hård af Segerstad

Placement
- Semi-final result: Qualified (1st, 217 points)
- Final result: 1st, 365 points

Participation chronology

Sweden was represented at the Eurovision Song Contest 2015 with the song "Heroes", written by Linnea Deb, Joy Deb, and Anton Malmberg Hård af Segerstad, and performed by Måns Zelmerlöw. The Swedish participating broadcaster, Sveriges Television (SVT), organised the national final Melodifestivalen 2015 in order to select its entry for the contest.

After a six-week-long competition consisting of four heats, a Second Chance round and a final, "Heroes" performed by Måns Zelmerlöw emerged as the winner of the Melodifestivalen 2015 after achieving the highest score following the combination of votes from eleven international jury groups and a public vote.

Sweden was drawn to compete in the second semi-final of the Eurovision Song Contest which took place on 21 May 2015. Performing during the show in position 13, "Heroes" was announced among the top 10 entries of the second semi-final and therefore qualified to compete in the final on 23 May. It was later revealed that Sweden placed first out of the 17 participating countries in the semi-final with 217 points. In the final, Sweden performed in position 10 and placed first out of the 27 participating countries, winning the contest with 365 points. This was the sixth win for Sweden in the Eurovision Song Contest, having previously won in 1974, 1984, 1991, 1999, and 2012.

== Background ==
Prior to the 2015 contest, Sveriges Radio (SR) until 1979, and Sveriges Television (SVT) since 1980, had participated in the Eurovision Song Contest representing Sweden fifty-four times since SR's first entry in 1958. They had won the contest on five occasions: in 1974 with the song "Waterloo" performed by ABBA, in 1984 with the song "Diggi-Loo Diggi-Ley" performed by Herreys, in 1991 with the song "Fångad av en stormvind" performed by Carola, in 1999 with the song "Take Me to Your Heaven" performed by Charlotte Nilsson, and in 2012 with the song "Euphoria" performed by Loreen. Following the introduction of semi-finals for the 2004, the Swedish entries, to this point, had featured in every final except for 2010 when the nation failed to qualify. In 2014, Sweden placed third in the contest with the song "Undo" performed by Sanna Nielsen.

As part of its duties as participating broadcaster, SVT organises the selection of its entry in the Eurovision Song Contest and broadcasts the event in the country. Since 1959, SR first and SVT later have organised the annual competition Melodifestivalen in order to select their entries for the contest.

== Before Eurovision ==
=== Melodifestivalen 2015 ===
Melodifestivalen 2015 was the Swedish music competition that selected their entry for the Eurovision Song Contest 2015. 28 competed in a six-week-long process which consisted of four heats on 7, 14, 21 and 28 February 2015, a second chance round on 7 March 2015, and a final on 14 March 2015. The six shows were hosted by Sanna Nielsen and Robin Paulsson. Seven songs competed in each heat—the top two qualified directly to the final, while the third and fourth placed songs qualified to the second chance round. The bottom three songs in each heat were eliminated from the competition. An additional four songs qualified to the final from the second chance round. The results in the heats and second chance round were determined exclusively by public televote and app voting, while the overall winner of the competition was selected in the final through the combination of a public vote and the votes from eleven international jury groups. Among the competing artists were former Eurovision Song Contest contestants Marie Bergman who represented Sweden in 1971 and 1972 as part of the group Family Four as well as in 1994 performing in a duet with Roger Pontare, Jessica Andersson who represented Sweden in 2003 as part of the duo Fame and Eric Saade who represented Sweden in 2011.

==== Heats and Second Chance round ====
- The first heat took place on 7 February 2015 at the Scandinavium in Gothenburg. "Sting" performed by Eric Saade and "Can't Hurt Me Now" performed by Jessica Andersson qualified directly to the final, while "Hello Hi" performed by Dolly Style and "Det rår vi inte för" performed by Behrang Miri feat. Victor Crone qualified to the Second Chance round. "I'll Be Fine" performed by Molly Pettersson Hammar, "Pappa" performed by Daniel Gildenlöw, and "One by One" performed by Rickard Söderberg and Elize Ryd were eliminated.
- The second heat took place on 14 February 2015 at the Malmö Arena in Malmö. "Don't Stop Believing" performed by Mariette and "Möt mig i Gamla stan" performed by Magnus Carlsson qualified directly to the final, while "Groupie" performed by Samir and Viktor and "Forever Starts Today" performed by Linus Svenning qualified to the Second Chance round. "Där och då med dig" performed by Emelie Irewald, "If I Was God for One Day" performed by Neverstore, and "Nonetheless" performed by Marie Bergman and Sanne Salomonsen were eliminated.
- The third heat took place on 21 February 2015 at the Östersund Arena in Östersund. "Jag är fri (Manne leam frijje)" performed by Jon Henrik Fjällgren and "Don't Stop" performed by Isa qualified directly to the final, while "Bring Out the Fire" performed by Andreas Weise and "I See You" performed by Kristin Amparo qualified to the Second Chance round. "Insomnia" performed by Ellen Benediktson, "För din skull" performed by Kalle Johansson, and "Living to Die" performed by Andreas Johnson were eliminated.
- The fourth heat took place on 28 February 2015 at the Conventum Arena in Örebro. "Heroes" performed by Måns Zelmerlöw and "Building It Up" performed by JTR qualified directly to the final, while "Guld och gröna skogar" performed by Hasse Andersson and "Make Me (La La La)" performed by Dinah Nah qualified to the Second Chance round. "Don't Say No" performed by Midnight Boy, "Black Swan" performed by Caroline Wennergren, and "Ett andetag" performed by Annika Herlitz were eliminated.
- The Second Chance round (Andra chansen) took place on 7 March 2015 at the Helsingborg Arena in Helsingborg. "Forever Starts Today" performed by Linus Svenning, "Guld och gröna skogar" performed by Hasse Andersson, "Make Me (La La La)" performed by Dinah Nah, and "Groupie" performed by Samir and Viktor qualified to the final.

==== Final ====
The final was held on 14 March 2015 at the Friends Arena in Stockholm. Twelve songs competed—two qualifiers from each of the four preceding heats and four qualifiers from the Second Chance round. The combination of points from a viewer vote and eleven international jury groups determined the winner. The viewers and the juries each had a total of 473 points to award. The nations that comprised the international jury were Armenia, Austria, Belgium, Cyprus, Estonia, France, Israel, Malta, the Netherlands, Slovenia and the United Kingdom. "Heroes" performed by Måns Zelmerlöw was selected as the winner with 288 points.

R/O	Artist	Song	Juries	Televote	Total	Place
1	Samir and Viktor	"Groupie"	29	20	49	8
2	JTR	"Building It Up"	21	4	25	10
3	Dinah Nah	"Make Me (La La La)"	14	8	22	12
4	Jon Henrik Fjällgren	"Jag är fri (Manne leam frijje)"	51	88	139	2
5	Jessica Andersson	"Can't Hurt Me Now"	15	8	23	11
6	Måns Zelmerlöw	"Heroes"	122	166	288	1
7	Linus Svenning	"Forever Starts Today"	41	18	59	6
8	Isa	"Don't Stop"	38	18	56	7
9	Magnus Carlsson	"Möt mig i Gamla stan"	10	18	28	9
10	Eric Saade	"Sting"	48	29	77	5
11	Mariette	"Don't Stop Believing"	74	28	102	3
12	Hasse Andersson	"Guld och gröna skogar"	10	68	78	4

== At Eurovision ==
According to Eurovision rules, all nations with the exceptions of the host country and the "Big Five" (France, Germany, Italy, Spain and the United Kingdom) are required to qualify from one of two semi-finals in order to compete for the final; the top ten countries from each semi-final progress to the final. In the 2015 contest, Australia also competed directly in the final as an invited guest nation. The European Broadcasting Union (EBU) split up the competing countries into five different pots based on voting patterns from previous contests, with countries with favourable voting histories put into the same pot. On 26 January 2015, a special allocation draw was held which placed each country into one of the two semi-finals, as well as which half of the show they would perform in. Sweden was placed into the second semi-final, to be held on 21 May 2015, and was scheduled to perform in the second half of the show.

Once all the competing songs for the 2015 contest had been released, the running order for the semi-finals was decided by the shows' producers rather than through another draw, so that similar songs were not placed next to each other. Sweden was set to perform in position 13, following the entry from Iceland and before the entry from Switzerland. All three shows were televised on SVT1, with commentary by Sanna Nielsen and Edward af Sillén as well as broadcast via radio on SR P4 with commentary by Carolina Norén and Ronnie Ritterland. SVT appointed Mariette Hansson as its spokesperson to announce the Swedish votes during the final.

=== Semi-final ===
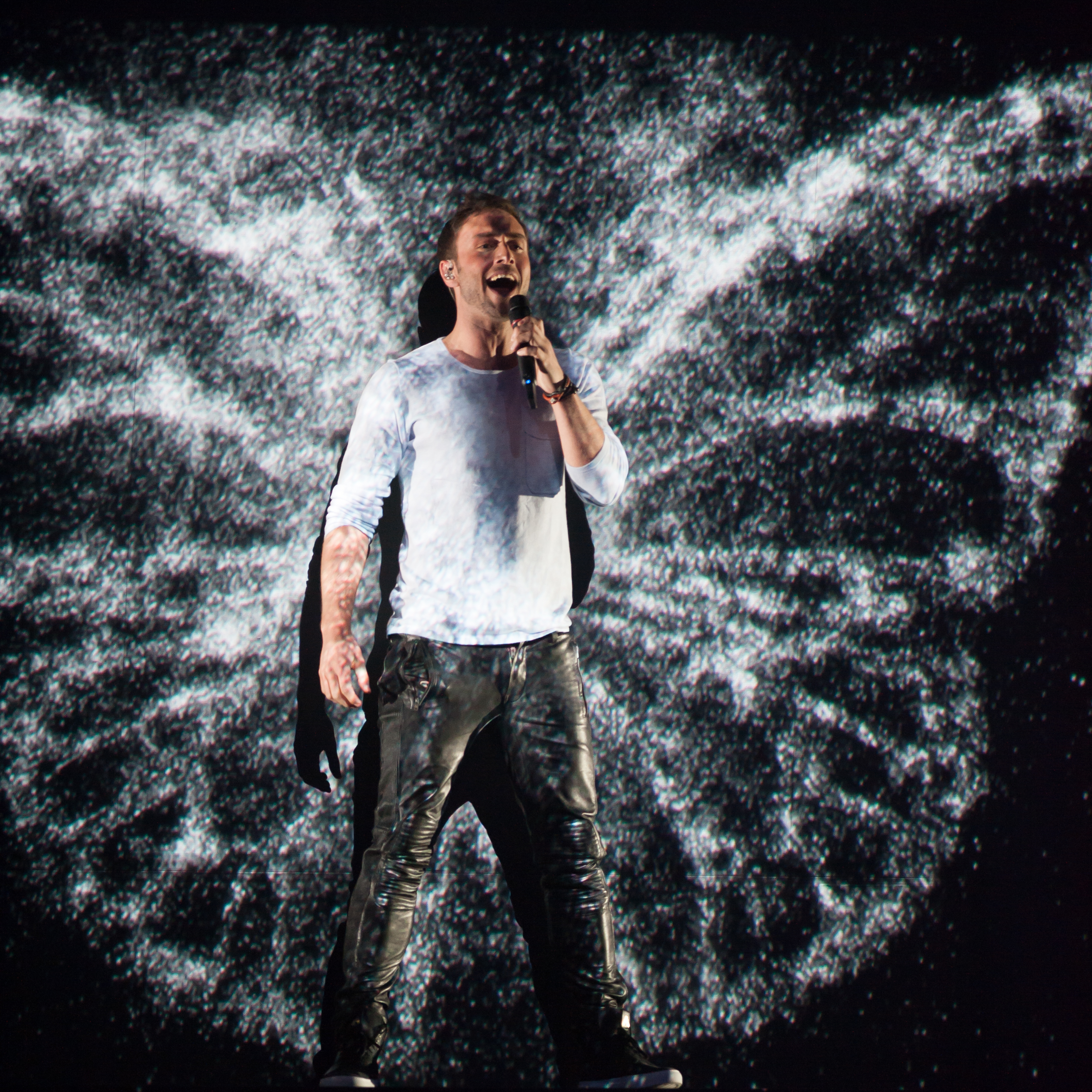
Zelmerlöw at a dress rehearsal for the second semi-final

Zelmerlöw took part in technical rehearsals on 14 and 16 May, followed by dress rehearsals on 20 and 21 May. This included the jury final where professional juries of each country, responsible for 50 percent of each country's vote, watched and voted on the competing entries.

The stage show featured Zelmerlöw performing in front of a projection board. During the verses, the performance focused on him singing in front of the board, interacting with choreographed graphics such as stick-man figures. During the chorus, the LED displays in the background displayed bursts of light and movement. On stage, Zelmerlöw wore black leather trousers and a grey jumper with nothing underneath. He was joined by five offstage backing vocalists: Britta Bergström, Michael Blomqvist, Linnea Deb, Alexander Holmgren and Jeanette Olsson.

At the end of the show, Sweden was announced as having finished in the top ten and subsequently qualifying for the grand final. It was later revealed that Sweden had won the semi-final, receiving a total of 217 points.

=== Final ===
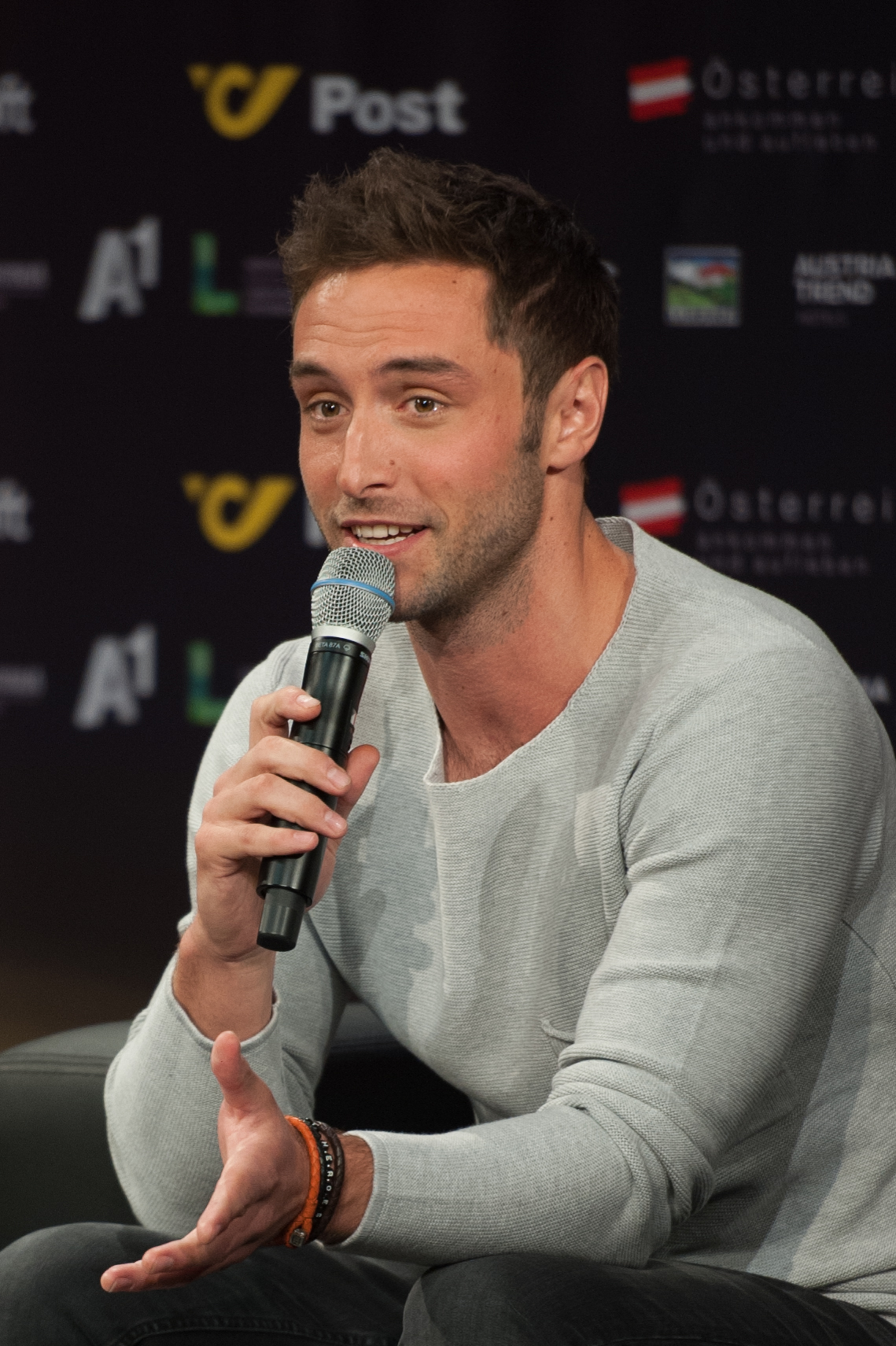
Zelmerlöw during a press meet and greet.

Shortly after the second semi-final, a winner's press conference was held for the ten qualifying countries. As part of this press conference, the qualifying artists took part in a draw to determine which half of the grand final they would subsequently participate in. This draw was done in the order the countries were announced during the semi-final. Sweden was drawn to compete in the first half. Following this draw, the shows' producers decided upon the running order of the final, as they had done for the semi-finals. Sweden was subsequently placed to perform in position 10, following the entry from Norway and before the entry from Cyprus. On the day of the grand final, Sweden was the top favourite to win the competition according to the bookmakers.

Zelmerlöw once again took part in dress rehearsals on 22 and 23 May before the final, including the jury final where the professional juries cast their final votes before the live show. Zelmerlöw performed a repeat of his semi-final performance during the final on 23 May. Sweden won the competition with 365 points, beating Russia and Italy into second and third places respectively. Sweden received 12 points, the maximum number of points a country can give to another country, from twelve countries. The broadcast was watched by an average 3.282 million people in Sweden with viewership peaking at 4.3 million.

==== Marcel Bezençon Awards ====
The Marcel Bezençon Awards, first awarded during the 2002 contest, are awards honouring the best competing songs in the final each year. Named after the creator of the annual contest, Marcel Bezençon, the awards are divided into 3 categories: the Press Award, given to the best entry as voted on by the accredited media and press during the event; the Artistic Award, presented to the best artist as voted on by the shows' commentators; and the Composer Award, given to the best and most original composition as voted by the participating composers. "Heroes" was awarded the Artistic Award, which was accepted at the awards ceremony by Måns Zelmerlöw.

=== Voting ===
Voting during the three shows consisted of 50 percent public televoting and 50 percent from a jury deliberation. The jury consisted of five music industry professionals who were citizens of the country they represent, with their names published before the contest to ensure transparency. This jury was asked to judge each contestant based on: vocal capacity; the stage performance; the song's composition and originality; and the overall impression by the act. In addition, no member of a national jury could be related in any way to any of the competing acts in such a way that they cannot vote impartially and independently. The individual rankings of each jury member were released shortly after the grand final.

Following the release of the full split voting by the EBU after the conclusion of the competition, it was revealed that the public televote and jury results were in disagreement in regards to the winner in the final. Sweden was the winner of the jury vote with 353 points, however, the nation only managed third place with 279 points in the public televote, finishing behind Italy and Russia respectively. In the second semi-final, Sweden placed first with the public televote receiving 195 points and first with the jury vote with 208 points.

Below is a breakdown of points awarded to Sweden and awarded by Sweden in the second semi-final and grand final of the contest, and the breakdown of the jury voting and televoting conducted during the two shows:

==== Points awarded to Sweden ====
Points awarded to Sweden (Semi-final 2)
Score	Country
12 points	Australia; Cyprus; Czech Republic; Germany; Iceland; Israel; Latvia; Malta; Norway; Poland; Portugal; San Marino; Slovenia; Switzerland
10 points	Ireland; Italy; Lithuania
8 points	Montenegro
7 points	United Kingdom
6 points	
5 points	
4 points	Azerbaijan
3 points	
2 points	
1 point	

Points awarded to Sweden (Final)
Score	Country
12 points	Australia; Belgium; Denmark; Finland; Iceland; Italy; Latvia; Norway; Poland; Slovenia; Switzerland; United Kingdom
10 points	Belarus; Cyprus; Czech Republic; Estonia; Germany; Hungary; Ireland; Israel; Lithuania; Malta; Netherlands
8 points	France; Moldova; Portugal; Romania; Russia; Serbia; Spain
7 points	Albania; Armenia; Austria; Georgia; San Marino
6 points	Azerbaijan
5 points	Macedonia; Montenegro
4 points	Greece
3 points	
2 points	
1 point	

==== Points awarded by Sweden ====
Points awarded by Sweden (Semi-final 2)
Score	Country
12 points	Norway
10 points	Israel
8 points	Latvia
7 points	Montenegro
6 points	Cyprus
5 points	Poland
4 points	Azerbaijan
3 points	Ireland
2 points	Iceland
1 point	Czech Republic

Points awarded by Sweden (Final)
Score	Country
12 points	Australia
10 points	Belgium
8 points	Italy
7 points	Norway
6 points	Russia
5 points	Latvia
4 points	Israel
3 points	Estonia
2 points	Montenegro
1 point	Slovenia

==== Detailed voting results ====
The following members comprised the Swedish jury:

- Filip Adamo (jury chairperson) – independent music professional, production manager
- Lina Hedlund – singer
- Henrik Johnsson – radio/TV producer, anchor
- Rennie Mirro – dancer, choreographer, actor
- Isa Tengblad (Isa) – singer, dancer, composer

Detailed voting results from Sweden (Semi-final 2)
R/O	Country	F. Adamo	L. Hedlund	H. Johnsson	R. Mirro	Isa	Jury Rank	Televote Rank	Combined Rank	Points
01	Lithuania	12	14	15	8	14	14	9	13	
02	Ireland	4	4	1	3	4	3	14	8	3
03	San Marino	15	16	16	16	16	16	16	16	
04	Montenegro	6	2	5	5	5	4	6	4	7
05	Malta	8	6	9	7	11	7	15	12	
06	Norway	2	1	3	2	1	1	1	1	12
07	Portugal	16	10	10	11	12	12	12	15	
08	Czech Republic	13	9	6	10	10	9	10	10	1
09	Israel	5	5	4	6	13	6	2	2	10
10	Latvia	1	3	2	1	3	2	7	3	8
11	Azerbaijan	3	8	8	4	2	5	11	7	4
12	Iceland	9	12	14	14	6	11	8	9	2
13	Sweden									
14	Switzerland	7	15	12	12	7	10	13	14	
15	Cyprus	11	7	7	9	8	8	4	5	6
16	Slovenia	10	11	13	15	15	15	5	11	
17	Poland	14	13	11	13	9	13	3	6	5

Detailed voting results from Sweden (Final)
R/O	Country	F. Adamo	L. Hedlund	H. Johnsson	R. Mirro	Isa	Jury Rank	Televote Rank	Combined Rank	Points
01	Slovenia	13	8	9	14	22	11	13	10	1
02	France	18	19	12	13	10	15	26	22	
03	Israel	6	5	4	8	11	7	8	7	4
04	Estonia	14	12	13	12	18	13	5	8	3
05	United Kingdom	23	25	21	25	24	25	20	25	
06	Armenia	26	24	25	26	26	26	18	23	
07	Lithuania	19	13	14	20	23	18	16	17	
08	Serbia	15	15	8	22	19	17	10	12	
09	Norway	8	3	3	6	3	4	4	4	7
10	Sweden									
11	Cyprus	16	10	15	21	17	16	17	16	
12	Australia	3	1	1	3	1	1	1	1	12
13	Belgium	4	2	5	2	8	3	2	2	10
14	Austria	12	22	11	11	12	12	24	20	
15	Greece	17	17	20	17	20	19	25	24	
16	Montenegro	11	4	16	7	7	9	12	9	2
17	Germany	7	14	19	16	13	14	21	19	
18	Poland	22	18	22	18	21	22	9	14	
19	Latvia	5	6	2	1	6	2	11	6	5
20	Romania	21	23	18	15	15	20	15	18	
21	Spain	10	16	17	10	9	10	14	11	
22	Hungary	24	21	24	23	25	23	22	26	
23	Georgia	20	20	23	19	14	21	19	21	
24	Azerbaijan	9	9	10	5	5	8	23	15	
25	Russia	2	7	7	9	4	6	7	5	6
26	Albania	25	26	26	24	16	24	6	13	
27	Italy	1	11	6	4	2	5	3	3	8
