= Don't Stop Believing (disambiguation) =

"Don't Stop Believin'" is a 1981 song by Journey.

Don't Stop Believing or Don't Stop Believin' may also refer to:

== Don't Stop Believin' ==
- Don't Stop Believin' (album), a 1976 album by Olivia Newton-John
  - "Don't Stop Believin'" (Olivia Newton-John song), the album's title song
- "Don't Stop Believin'" (Degrassi: The Next Generation), an episode of Degrassi: The Next Generation
- Don't Stop Believin': Everyman's Journey, a 2012 documentary film about the band Journey
- Don't Stop Believin' (TV series), a 2012 Singapore TV series
- "Don't Stop Believin'", a song by Stage Dolls from their album Stage Dolls
- "Don't Stop Believin'", an episode of Guardians of the Galaxy: The Telltale Series

== Don't Stop Believing ==
- "Don't Stop Believing" (Mariette song), a song by Mariette Hansson for Melodifestivalen 2015
- Don't Stop Believing (TV series), a British talent show

== See also ==
- Don't Stop (disambiguation)
