= Tenori (vocal group) =

British–Swedish vocal group

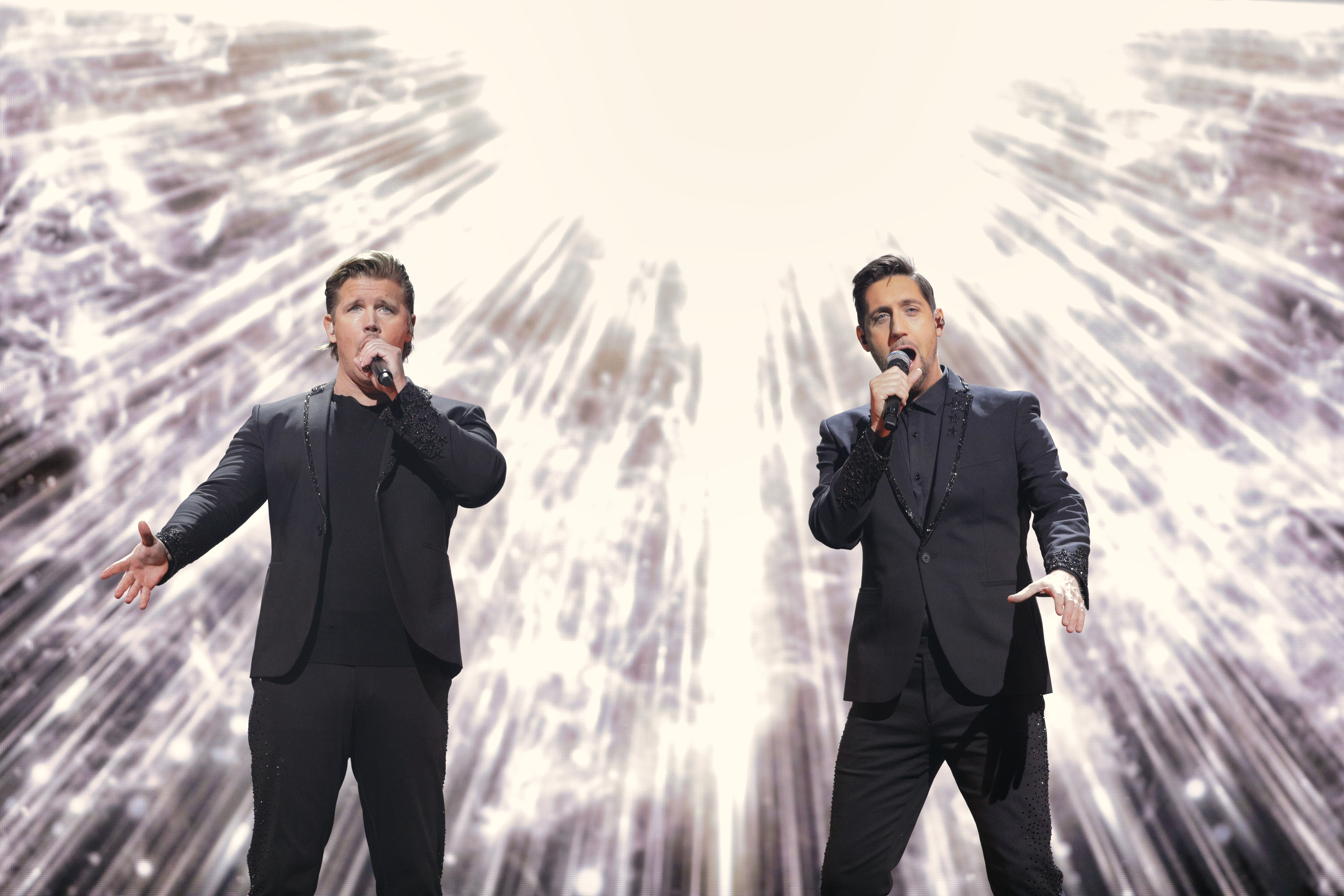
- Alexander Grove and Kalle Leander representing Tenori at Melodifestivalen 2022

Background information
- Origin: United Kingdom and Sweden
- Genres: Opera crossover, classical crossover
- Years active: 2003–present
- Label: Universal Music Sweden
- Members: Alexander Grove; William Davis Lind; Mike Sterling
- Past members: Jon Cristos; John Marsden; James Edwards; David Habbin; Lincoln Stone; Mark Chaundy; Richard Coxon; Stephen Brown; Michael Bracegirdle; Colin Judson; Andrew Rees; Anthony Flaum; John Hudson; Andreas Backlund; Ulric Björklund; Kalle Leander
- Website: www.tenori.net

Tenori (Italian for "tenors") is a British–Swedish classical crossover vocal group consisting of tenor and producer Alexander Grove, accompanied by guest tenors from the United Kingdom, Sweden and abroad.

The members are professionally trained opera and musical theatre tenors. Their repertoire combines opera, musical theatre and crossover music.

== History ==
The group was founded in the United Kingdom in 2003 as a trio consisting of Alexander Grove, Jon Cristos and John Marsden. The idea originated during their studies as classical singers at the Royal Northern College of Music in Manchester, where they discovered a shared experience of having lost their fathers at a young age due to chronic illness.

During their studies in Manchester they met Perry Hughes, agent to the English tenor Russell Watson, and began recording songs for Sony Music. Their debut came with a concert tour of the United Kingdom intended to raise awareness for the charities Cancer Research UK, the British Heart Foundation and Kidney Research UK.

Cristos subsequently left the group to pursue a solo career, followed shortly afterwards by Marsden. In 2006 Grove continued the project with colleagues from major British opera companies and London's West End. Between 2006 and 2016 Tenori performed internationally, including appearances in Malta, Turkey, Spain, Italy, Croatia and Brazil.

== Sweden ==
Tenori expanded into Sweden in 2010 and held auditions in Gothenburg and Stockholm. Swedish tenor Ulric Björklund was selected to join the group and made his debut alongside Grove and British tenor James Edwards in a televised concert at Cadogan Hall in London in support of the charity Genius for Genes. Two years later, after concerts in the United Kingdom, Sweden and the Caribbean, Edwards left the group to pursue a solo career.

In 2016, Grove met Swedish tenor Kalle Leander while both were working in Denmark at the Den Jyske Opera. Later that year tenor Andreas Backlund joined the group and, together with Grove's production company Vocalizzi Productions, they began producing concerts throughout Västra Götaland and Skåne.

During 2018 the group produced the stage show From West End to..., which was performed at venues including the Stora Teatern, Gothenburg, Växjö Concert Hall and Helsingborgs konserthus. Guest artists included Mike Sterling, Anna Werner, Micaela Sjöstedt and Johan Stengård.

The group subsequently toured Sweden with the productions Christmas with Tenori and An Evening with..., featuring Grove, Leander and Björklund together with guest artists Jenny Silver and Anna Bromée.

Later that year Tenori were invited to open the concert season at Kulturhuset Spira in a gala concert together with Jönköpings Sinfonietta.

Between 2016 and 2018 Grove appeared in Malmö Opera's New Year's Gala alongside Marianne Mörck, and in Rickard Söderberg's productions Teaterhotellet and One Nun Too Many at Ystad Theatre with Mörck and Sven Melander. This led to a collaboration with Mörck in the touring production Tenori with Marianne Mörck. Grove, Leander and Mörck subsequently appeared on Bingolotto on TV4.

After performances at Lorensbergsteatern and Helsingborg Concert Hall, the remaining dates of the tour were cancelled as a result of the COVID-19 pandemic. During the pandemic, Tenori recorded songs together with Mariette Hansson and began a collaboration with Universal Music Sweden.

== Melodifestivalen 2022 ==
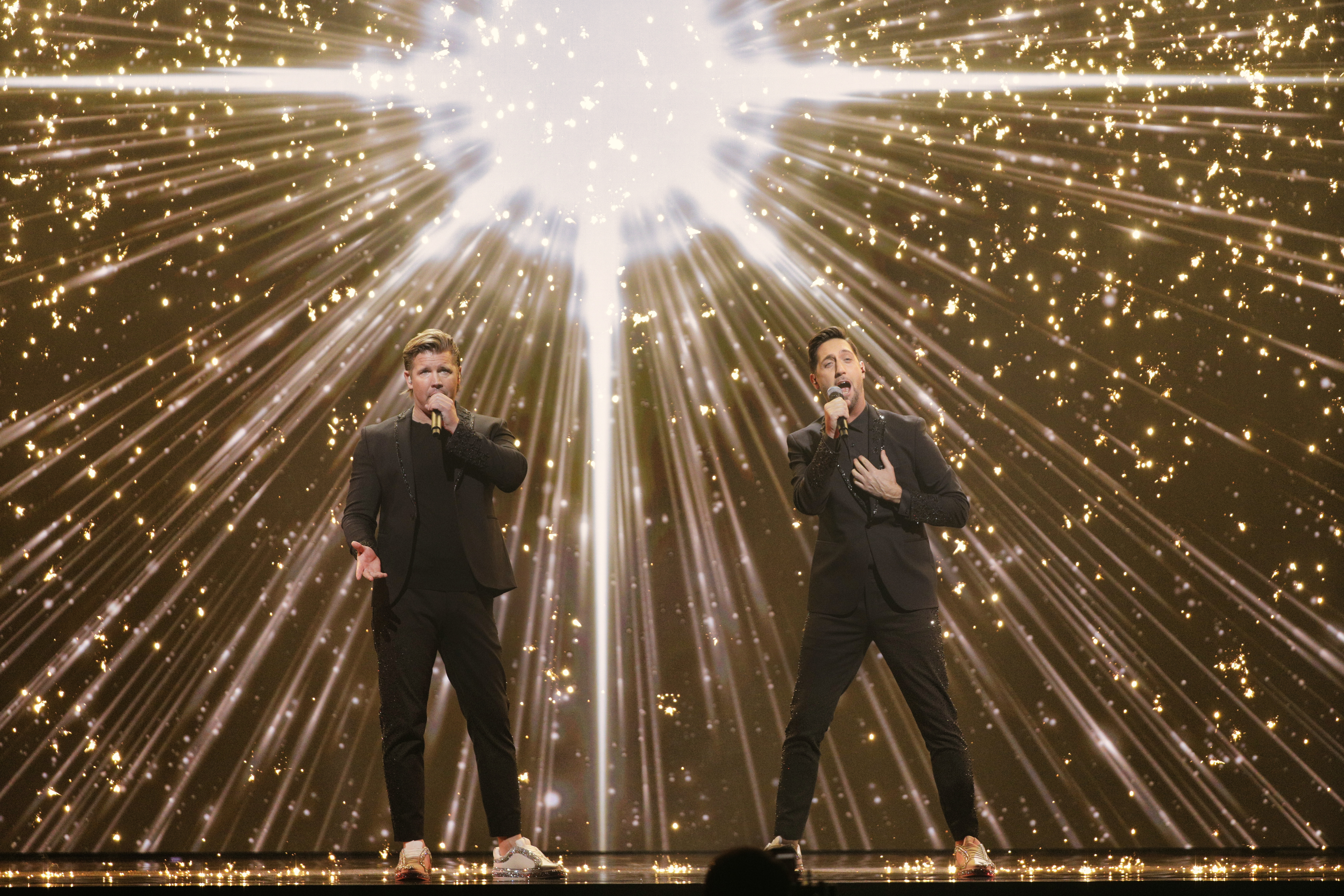
Tenori perform at Melodifestivalen 2022

In 2022 Grove and Leander met songwriter Bobby Ljunggren. Together with producer Dan Sundquist, songwriter Marcos Ubeda and lyricist Kristian Lagerström, they recorded the song "La Stella". Tenori competed as a duo in the fourth heat of Melodifestivalen 2022. The entry failed to qualify from the heat.

Leander left the group later in 2022. The planned concert tour, Tenori Meets Loa Falkman, was subsequently cancelled. William Davis Lind, an opera tenor with a background in rock music, subsequently joined the group. Grove and Davis Lind collaborated with songwriter Fredrik Kempe and producer Dan Sundquist on new material and later with Chris Rehn of Boxroom Studios and songwriter Bobby Ljunggren on new recordings.

== Members ==
=== Current members ===
- Alexander Grove
- William Davis Lind
- Mike Sterling

=== Former members ===
- Jon Cristos
- John Marsden
- James Edwards
- David Habbin
- Lincoln Stone
- Mark Chaundy
- Richard Coxon
- Stephen Brown
- Michael Bracegirdle
- Colin Judson
- Andrew Rees
- Anthony Flaum
- John Hudson
- Andreas Backlund
- Ulric Björklund
- Kalle Leander

== Discography ==
=== Singles ===
- "La Stella" (2022)
