= Isa Tengblad =

Musical artist

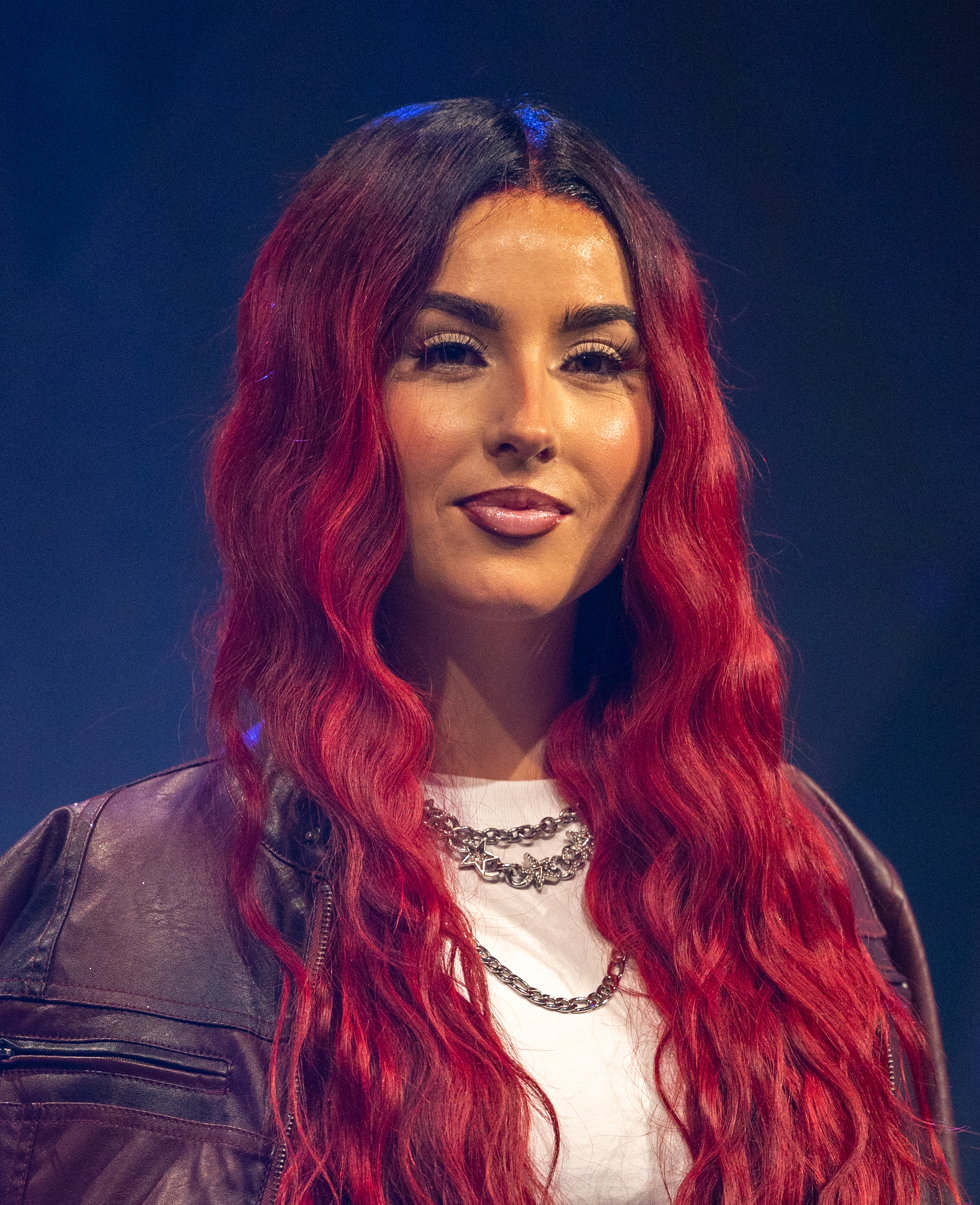
- Isa Tengblad in 2025

Background information
- Also known as: Isa; Bladë
- Born: Isa Sanna Mattiasdotter Tengblad; 25 April 1998 (age 28); Bromma, Stockholm, Sweden
- Genre: Pop
- Occupations: singer, songwriter
- Years active: 2010–present

Isa Sanna Mattiasdotter Tengblad (born 25 April 1998), previously known mononymously as Isa (stylized as ISA) and currently as Bladë, is a Swedish singer, songwriter, and producer. She is best known for her participations in Melodifestivalen 2015 and Melodifestivalen 2016. The nightcore remix of her 2012 single "Bomb" has amassed over 20 million views on YouTube across several re-uploads. She independently released her most recent EP in late 2022, titled Anxiety Boulevard, which she also produced and wrote. In addition to her career as a performer, Tengblad has written and produced songs for artists such as Jordin Sparks and Peg Parnevik.

== Life and career ==
=== Early career ===
She participated in Småstjärnorna, which was broadcast on TV4, where she imitated singer Jill Johnson. She also competed on Talang Sverige in 2009 as a member of the duo Electrified. In the summer of 2012, she released the single "Bomb". She performed the song at Sommarkrysset the same year. The nightcore remix of the song went viral and has currently surpassed 20 million views on YouTube across several re-uploads. In 2014, she released the single "What Are We".

=== Melodifestivalen ===
Tengblad participated in Melodifestivalen 2015 with the song "Don't Stop" in the competition's third semi-final. She made it to the final in Friends Arena finishing 7th overall. In May 2015, she formed part of the Swedish jury at the Eurovision Song Contest 2015.

She also took part in Melodifestivalen 2016 with the song "I Will Wait". She advanced to the Second Chance round after placing 3rd in her heat, but did not qualify for the final after losing by less than 1% of the vote.

She went on to co-write Malou Prytz's Melodifestivalen 2019 entry "I Do Me", which qualified directly to the final, where it ended in 12th place.

In addition to participating as an artist and songwriter at Melodifestivalen, Tengblad has provided live backing vocals for several acts, including "Ballerina" (2020) and "Bananas" (2022) by Malou Prytz, "For the Show" (2023) by Melanie Wehbe, "Låt hela stan se på" (2023) by Ida-Lova, "Where Did You Go" (2023) by Kiana, and "One Day" (2023) by Mariette.

=== 2017–present ===
After competing in Melodifestivalen, she released numerous singles under her own independent label, Licious Music. Her 2018 single "Perfect" was streamed over 2 million times on Spotify and she released her debut album, titled Debut Album, on 24 May 2019.

Tengblad released her second EP "Anxiety Boulevard" in October 2022.

In fall 2023, Tengblad starred in the musical The One by Fredrik Rydman where she played the character Linda. Her vocals are featured on the show's soundtrack, which includes her solo "Vem faan e du".

=== Songwriting and producing ===
In addition to her work as a singer and performer, Tengblad is an active songwriter and producer. She most recently co-wrote the song "No Cry" released by Jordin Sparks and Stonebwoy (2024). Some of the other songs she has co-written include: "I Love It Loud" released by Dutch vlogger Djamila (2018), "If It Ain't Love" released by Malou Prytz (2020), "Halo (내일로)" released by South Korean actress Park Jin-joo on the If You Wish Upon Me soundtrack (2022), and "Tornedalen (Mitt efternamn)" released by Myra Granberg (2024). Tengblad also produced and co-wrote the song "Put Me First", which would go on to be recorded at Spotify Studios and be released through the Spotify Singles program in March 2023 by Polish singer Tynsky and TEN Music Group's Claudia Neuser.

Tengblad has contributed significantly to Swedish singer Peg Parnevik's discography as a songwriter, producer, and backing vocalist. She has co-written and produced two of Parnevik's EPs, including What They'll Say About Us (2021) and Om ett par år (2023). In November 2023, she produced Parnevik's cover of "Vi är tjejer, vi är bäst" for the Swedish TV program Så mycket bättre. While performing on tour with Parnevik, Tengblad has been featured on shows such as Musikhjälpen (2021).

In 2025, she adopted the artist name Bladë. On 2 December 2025, she was announced as a participant of Melodifestivalen 2026 with the song "Who You Are".

== Discography ==
=== Albums ===
Title	Details
Debut Album	Released: 24 May 2019; Label: Licious Music; Format: Digital download, streaming

=== EPs ===
Title	Details
Don't Stop	Released: 8 May 2015; Label: Sony Music Entertainment Sweden AB; Format: Digital download, streaming
Anxiety Boulevard	Released: 28 October 2022; Label: ISA, distributed by Corite; Format: Digital download, streaming

=== Singles ===
Title	Year	Peak chart positions		Certifications	Album
Title	Year	SWE	TUR	Certifications	Album
"Bomb"	2012	—	—		Non-album singles
"What Are We"	2014	—	—		Non-album singles
"Don't Stop"	2015	14	12	GLF: Platinum	Don't Stop EP
"Drum & Bass"	2015	—	—		Don't Stop EP
"Let It Kill You"	2015	—	—		Non-album singles
"I Will Wait"	2016	35	—	GLF: Gold	Non-album singles
"I.S.A."	2017	—	—		Non-album singles
"Perfect"	2018	—	—		Debut Album
"Shy"	2018	—	—		Debut Album
"Craving"	2019	—	—		Debut Album
"Who the Hell"	2019	—	—		Non-album singles
"Never Change"	2020	—	—		Non-album singles
"Bleed"	2022	—	—		Anxiety Boulevard
"Who You Are"	2026	64	—		Non-album single
"—" denotes a single that did not chart or was not released in that territory.
