= I'll Be Fine =

I'll Be Fine may also refer to:

== Television ==
- I'll Be Fine (TV series), a 2014 Polish television series

== Popular culture ==
=== In music ===
==== Albums ====
- I'll Be Fine, a 2001 album by Janita

==== Songs and singles ====
- "I'll Be Fine", a 2001 single by Janita
- "I'll Be Fine", a 1988 song by Rick Astley
- "I'll Be Fine", a song by Critical Mass
- "I'll Be Fine", a song by Emmet Swimming
- "I'll Be Fine", a song by The Copyrights
- "I'll Be Fine", a song by Juice WRLD
- "I'll Be Fine (Molly Pettersson Hammar song)", a 2015 song by Molly Pettersson Hammar
