= Melodifestivalen 2015 =

Swedish music competition

Dates and venues
- Heat 1: 7 February 2015; Scandinavium, Gothenburg
- Heat 2: 14 February 2015; Malmö Arena, Malmö
- Heat 3: 21 February 2015; Östersund Arena, Östersund
- Heat 4: 28 February 2015; Conventum Arena, Örebro
- Second chance: 7 March 2015; Helsingborg Arena, Helsingborg
- Final: 14 March 2015; Friends Arena, Solna

Production
- Broadcaster: Sveriges Television (SVT)
- Director: Robin Hofwander; Fredrik Bäcklund
- Presenters: Robin Paulsson; Sanna Nielsen

Participants
- Number of entries: 28: 7 in each heat; 12 in the final (2 from each heat, 4 from the Second Chance round)

Vote
- Winning song: "Heroes" by Måns Zelmerlöw

Melodifestivalen 2015 was the Swedish music competition that selected Sweden's 55th entry for the Eurovision Song Contest 2015. Måns Zelmerlöw won with the song "Heroes". The hosts for the show were Sanna Nielsen (winner of Melodifestivalen 2014) and comedian Robin Paulsson.

For the fourteenth consecutive year, the competition consisted of four heats, a "Second Chance" round, and a final. However, the total number of competing entries was reduced from 32 to 28. The 28 competing entries were divided into four heats, with seven compositions in each. From each semifinal, the songs that earned first and second place went directly to the final, while the songs that placed third and fourth proceeded to the Second Chance round. The bottom three songs in each semifinal were eliminated from the competition.

A new rule for the 2015 edition of the competition stipulated that at least 50% of the selected entries were to be written by female composers or lyricists in a full or partial capacity.

== Format ==
Melodifestivalen 2015 was the fourteenth consecutive year in which the competition will take place in different cities across Sweden. The four semifinals were held in Gothenburg (7 February), Malmö (14 February), Östersund (21 February) and Örebro (28 February). The Second Chance round took place in Helsingborg on 7 March while the final in Solna was held on 14 March.

=== Schedule and ratings ===
Show	Date	City	Venue	Viewers	Votes
Heat 1	7 February	Gothenburg	Scandinavium	3,383,000	1,215,965
Heat 2	14 February	Malmö	Malmö Arena	3,332,000	2,382,636
Heat 3	21 February	Östersund	Östersund Arena	3,145,000	2,865,979
Heat 4	28 February	Örebro	Conventum Arena	3,111,000	2,573,350
Second Chance	7 March	Helsingborg	Helsingborg Arena	3,030,000	3,830,306
Final	14 March	Solna	Friends Arena	3,736,000	1,555,557

== Competing entries ==
Artist	Song	Songwriter(s)
Andreas Johnson	"Living to Die"	Andreas Johnson, Bobby Ljunggren, Karl-Ola Kjellholm
Andreas Weise	"Bring Out the Fire"	Henrik Jansson, Thomas G:son, Anton Malmberg Hård af Segerstad
Annika Herlitz	"Ett andetag"	Amir Aly, Maciel Numhauser, Robin Abrahamsson, Sharon Dyall, Sharon Vaughn
Behrang Miri feat. Victor Crone	"Det rår vi inte för"	Behrang Miri, Albin Johnsén, Måns Zelmerlöw, Tony Nilsson
Caroline Wennergren	"Black Swan"	Nicklas Eklund, Joel DeLuna, Aimee Bobruk
Daniel Gildenlöw	"Pappa"	Daniel Gildenlöw
Dinah Nah	"Make Me (La La La)"	Dinah Nah, Dr. Alban (Alban Nwapa), Jakke Erixson, Karl-Ola Kjellholm
Dolly Style	"Hello Hi"	Emma Nors, Palle Hammarlund, Jimmy Jansson
Ellen Benediktson	"Insomnia"	Ellen Benediktson, Anderz Wrethov
Emelie Irewald	"Där och då med dig"	Emelie Irewald
Eric Saade	"Sting"	Arash Fahmi, Fredrik Kempe, Hamed "K-one" Pirouzpanah, David Kreuger
Hasse Andersson	"Guld och gröna skogar"	Anderz Wrethov, Elin Wrethov, Johan Bejerholm, Johan Deltinger
Isa	"Don't Stop"	Isa Tengblad, Johan Ramström, Gustaf Svenungsson, Magnus Wallin, Oscar Merner
Jessica Andersson	"Can't Hurt Me Now"	Aleena Gibson, Fredrik Thomander
Jon Henrik Fjällgren	"Jag är fri (Manne Leam Frijje)"	Jon Henrik Fjällgren, Erik Holmberg, Tony Malm, Josef Melin
JTR	"Building It Up"	John Andreasson, Tom Lundbäck, Robin Lundbäck, Erik Lewander, Iggy Strange Dahl
Kalle Johansson	"För din skull"	Martin Eriksson, Thomas G:son, Thomas Karlsson
Kristin Amparo	"I See You"	Kristin Amparo, Fredrik Kempe, David Kreuger
Linus Svenning	"Forever Starts Today"	Aleena Gibson, Anton Malmberg Hård af Segerstad, Fredrik Kempe
Magnus Carlsson	"Möt mig i Gamla stan"	Thomas G:son, Lina Eriksson
Marie Bergman & Sanne Salomonsen	"Nonetheless"	Andreas Stone Johansson, Allison Kaplan
Mariette	"Don’t Stop Believing"	Miss Li (Linda Karlsson), Sonny Gustafsson
Midnight Boy	"Don't Say No"	Johan Krafman, Kristofer Östergren, Olle Blomström
Molly Pettersson Hammar	"I'll Be Fine"	Molly Pettersson Hammar, Lisa Desmond, Tim Larsson, Tobias Lundgren, Gavin Jones
Måns Zelmerlöw	"Heroes"	Anton Malmberg Hård af Segerstad, Joy Deb, Linnea Deb
Neverstore	"If I Was God For One Day"	Thomas G:son, John Gordon, Jacob Widén
Rickard Söderberg & Elize Ryd	"One By One"	Elize Ryd, Jimmy Jansson, Karl-Ola Kjellholm, Sharon Vaughn
Samir & Viktor	"Groupie"	Anton Malmberg Hård af Segerstad, Maria Smith, Kevin Högdahl, Viktor Thell

== Heats ==
=== Heat 1 ===
The results of this heat were contested after the crash of the application.

R/O	Artist	Song	Votes			Place	Results
R/O	Artist	Song	Round 1	Round 2	Total	Place	Results
1	Molly Pettersson Hammar	"I'll Be Fine"	82,807	—N/a	82,807	6	Out
2	Daniel Gildenlöw	"Pappa"	44,483	—N/a	44,483	7	Out
3	Rickard Söderberg & Elize Ryd	"One By One"	101,433	27,928	129,361	5	Out
4	Dolly Style	"Hello Hi"	138,255	16,961	155,216	3	Second chance
5	Behrang Miri feat. Victor Crone	"Det rår vi inte för"	140,374	8,606	148,980	4	Second chance
6	Jessica Andersson	"Can't Hurt Me Now"	187,686	25,279	212,965	2	Final
7	Eric Saade	"Sting"	413,556	35,324	448,880	1	Final

=== Heat 2 ===
R/O	Artist	Song	Votes			Place	Results
R/O	Artist	Song	Round 1	Round 2	Total	Place	Results
1	Linus Svenning	"Forever Starts Today"	357,113	36,156	393,269	4	Second chance
2	Emelie Irewald	"Där och då med dig"	134,638	—	134,638	6	Out
3	Samir & Viktor	"Groupie"	455,225	19,958	475,183	3	Second chance
4	Neverstore	"If I Was God For One Day"	253,725	12,227	265,952	5	Out
5	Marie Bergman & Sanne Salomonsen	"Nonetheless"	134,427	—	134,427	7	Out
6	Magnus Carlsson	"Möt mig i Gamla stan"	441,477	34,140	475,617	2	Final
7	Mariette	"Don’t Stop Believing"	472,908	28,219	501,127	1	Final

=== Heat 3 ===
R/O	Artist	Song	Votes			Place	Results
R/O	Artist	Song	Round 1	Round 2	Total	Place	Results
1	Ellen Benediktson	"Insomnia"	288,995	9,768	298,763	5	Out
2	Kalle Johansson	"För din skull"	261,572	—	261,572	6	Out
3	Andreas Weise	"Bring Out the Fire"	419,346	31,577	450,923	3	Second chance
4	Andreas Johnson	"Living to Die"	252,280	—	252,280	7	Out
5	Isa	"Don't Stop"	499,426	18,978	518,404	2	Final
6	Kristin Amparo	"I See You"	395,936	19,074	415,010	4	Second chance
7	Jon Henrik Fjällgren	"Jag är fri (Manne Leam Frijje)"	593,601	72,716	666,317	1	Final

=== Heat 4 ===
R/O	Artist	Song	Votes			Place	Results
R/O	Artist	Song	Round 1	Round 2	Total	Place	Results
1	Midnight Boy	"Don't Say No"	157,793	—	157,793	7	Out
2	Caroline Wennergren	"Black Swan"	252,405	31,787	284,192	5	Out
3	JTR	"Building It Up"	378,312	7,590	385,902	2	Final
4	Hasse Andersson	"Guld och gröna skogar"	339,263	40,042	379,305	3	Second chance
5	Dinah Nah	"Make Me (La La La)"	356,640	9,438	366,078	4	Second chance
6	Annika Herlitz	"Ett andetag"	226,388	—	226,388	6	Out
7	Måns Zelmerlöw	"Heroes"	712,652	58,771	771,423	1	Final

== Second Chance ==
The Second Chance (Andra chansen) round was held on 7 March 2015 in Helsingborg Arena, Helsingborg. Unlike in the previous editions, four out of eight competing entries were sent to the final this year. The preliminary two-phase voting introduced in 2013 was eliminated, bringing back a duel-only competition. The duels are as follows:

It was announced that Malena Ernman, Sweden's representative at the Eurovision Song Contest 2009 would join Behrang Miri and Victor Crone on stage to do the opera vocals.

Duel	R/O	Artist	Song	Votes	Result
I	1	Andreas Weise	"Bring Out the Fire"	402,521	Out
I	2	Linus Svenning	"Forever Starts Today"	531,109	Final
II	1	Hasse Andersson	"Guld och gröna skogar"	599,724	Final
II	2	Kristin Amparo	"I See You"	441,015	Out
III	1	Dolly Style	"Hello Hi"	404,960	Out
III	2	Dinah Nah	"Make Me (La La La)"	524,887	Final
IV	1	Behrang Miri feat. Victor Crone	"Det rår vi inte för"	297,739	Out
IV	2	Samir & Viktor	"Groupie"	628,022	Final

== Final ==
The grand final of this year's Melodifestivalen was held on 14 March in the 28,000-seat Friends Arena in Solna. Unlike in the previous editions of Melodifestivalen, twelve songs competed in this year's final, two more than before. Eight finalists were selected during the four-week semi finals and four from the Second Chance round.

R/O	Artist	Song	Juries	Televote/SMS			Total	Place
R/O	Artist	Song	Juries	Votes	%	Points	Total	Place
1	Samir & Viktor	"Groupie"	29	65,927	4.2%	20	49	8
2	JTR	"Building It Up"	21	14,236	0.9%	4	25	10
3	Dinah Nah	"Make Me (La La La)"	14	28,094	1.8%	8	22	12
4	Jon Henrik Fjällgren	"Jag är fri (Manne Leam Frijje)"	51	288,964	18.6%	88	139	2
5	Jessica Andersson	"Can't Hurt Me Now"	15	25,721	1.7%	8	23	11
6	Måns Zelmerlöw	"Heroes"	122	545,601	35.1%	166	288	1
7	Linus Svenning	"Forever Starts Today"	41	57,838	3.8%	18	59	6
8	Isa	"Don't Stop"	38	60,213	3.9%	18	56	7
9	Magnus Carlsson	"Möt mig i Gamla stan"	10	59,811	3.8%	18	28	9
10	Eric Saade	"Sting"	48	96,237	6.2%	29	77	5
11	Mariette	"Don't Stop Believing"	74	90,749	5.8%	28	102	3
12	Hasse Andersson	"Guld och gröna skogar"	10	222,166	14.3%	68	78	4

Detailed international jury votes
R/O	Song	Armenia	Austria	Belgium	Cyprus	Estonia	France	Israel	Malta	Netherlands	Slovenia	United Kingdom	Total
R/O	Song	Armenia	Austria	Belgium	Cyprus	Estonia	France	Israel	Malta	Netherlands	Slovenia	United Kingdom	Total
1	"Groupie"			10	4				8	6		1	29
2	"Building It Up"			8		6	6	1					21
3	"Make Me (La La La)"				1			2	10	1			14
4	"Jag är fri (Manne leam frijje)"	8	8	4		2	8			8	1	12	51
5	"Can't Hurt Me Now"	4					1		6		4		15
6	"Heroes"	12	12	12	12	12	12	6	12	12	12	8	122
7	"Forever Starts Today"	2	10	1	6	4	2	4			6	6	41
8	"Don't Stop"		4			10			2	4	8	10	38
9	"Möt mig i Gamla stan"	1	1		8								10
10	"Sting"	10	2	6	2	1	4	10	1	10		2	48
11	"Don't Stop Believing"	6	6	2	10	8	10	12	4	2	10	4	74
12	"Guld och gröna skogar"							8			2		10
