= Don't Stop =

Don't Stop may refer to:

== Albums ==
- Don't Stop (Annie album) or the title song, 2009
- Don't Stop (Jeffrey Osborne album) or the title song, 1984
- Don't Stop (Jolin Tsai album), or the title song, 2000
- Don't Stop (Rockets album) or the title song, 2003
- Don't Stop (Status Quo album), 1996
- Don't Stop (EP), by Billy Idol, 1981
- Don't Stop, by Bloodstone, 1979

== Songs ==
- "Don't Stop" (5 Seconds of Summer song), 2014
- "Don't Stop!" (ATB song), 1999
- "Don't Stop" (Baby Bash song), 2008
- "Don't Stop" (CDB song), 1996
- "Don't Stop" (Fleetwood Mac song), 1977
- "Don't Stop" (Innerpartysystem song), 2008
- "Don't Stop" (Isa song), 2015
- "Don't Stop" (Megan Thee Stallion song), 2020
- "Don't Stop" (Nothing More song), 2017
- "Don't Stop" (Rolling Stones song), 2002
- "Don't Stop" (Wade Hayes song), 1995
- "Don't Stop...", by Oasis, 2020
- "Don't Stop (Color on the Walls)", by Foster the People, 2012
- "Don't Stop (Funkin' 4 Jamaica)", by Mariah Carey, 2001
- "Don't Stop (Wiggle Wiggle)", by the Outhere Brothers, 1994
- "All Nite (Don't Stop)", by Janet Jackson, 2004
- "Gonna Make Ya Move (Don't Stop)", by Pink, 1998
- "Don't Stop", by Ace of Base from Da Capo, 2002
- "Don't Stop", by Blackbear from Help, 2015
- "Don't Stop", by Brazilian Girls from Brazilian Girls, 2005
- "Don't Stop", by Bucks Fizz, B-side of "Making Your Mind Up", 1981
- "Don't Stop", by Chali 2na from Fish Outta Water, 2009
- "Don't Stop!", by Child Rebel Soldier, 2010
- "Don't Stop", by Diana Ross from Take Me Higher, 1995
- "Don't Stop", by Geraint Watkins, 1997
- "Don't Stop", by Gloria Estefan from Gloria!, 1998
- "Don't Stop", by Heavy D from Heavy, 1999
- "Don't Stop", by Jars of Clay from The Long Fall Back to Earth, 2009
- "Don't Stop", by Madonna from Bedtime Stories, 1994
- "Don't Stop", by MC Hammer from The Funky Headhunter, 1994
- "Don't Stop", by the Mood, 1982
- "Don't Stop", by Our Lady Peace from Healthy in Paranoid Times, 2005
- "Don't Stop", by Ruff Driverz, 1998
- "Don't Stop", by Snoop Dogg from Coolaid, 2016
- "Don't Stop", by the Stone Roses from The Stone Roses, 1989
- "Don't Stop", by Sylvester from All I Need, 1982
- "Don't Stop", by Todrick Hall from Haus Party, Pt. 3, 2021
- "Don't Stop", by Zion & Lennox from Motivando A La Yal: Special Edition, 2005
- "Don't Stop (Doin' It)", by Anastacia from Freak of Nature, 2001

== See also ==
- Can't Stop (disambiguation)
