= Can't Stop =

Can't Stop may refer to:

- Can't Stop (album) or the title song, by Ashanti, 2004
- Can't Stop (EP) or the title song (see below), by CNBLUE, 2014
- Can't Stop (board game), a 1980 dice game designed by Sid Sackson

== Songs ==
- "Can't Stop" (After 7 song), 1990
- "Can't Stop" (CNBLUE song), 2014
- "Can't Stop" (Jacksoul song), 2000
- "Can't Stop" (Red Hot Chili Peppers song), 2002
- "Can't Stop", by Ace Hood from Gutta
- "Can't Stop", by DaBaby from Blame It on Baby
- "Can't Stop", by Dave Matthews Band from Live at Wrigley Field
- "Can't Stop", by Elbow from Asleep in the Back
- "Can't Stop", by Infected Mushroom from Legend of the Black Shawarma
- "Can't Stop", by Lil' O
- "Can't Stop", by M83 from Before the Dawn Heals Us
- "Can't Stop", by Madonna from the Who's That Girl soundtrack
- "Can't Stop", by Maroon 5 from It Won't Be Soon Before Long
- "Can't Stop", by Martin Solveig featuring Dragonette from Smash
- "Can't Stop", by OneRepublic from Native
- "Can't Stop", by Ozomatli from Don't Mess with the Dragon
- "Can't Stop", by Rick James from Glow
- "Can't Stop", by Suicidal Tendencies from The Art of Rebellion
- "Can't Stop", by Tomorrow X Together from Starkissed
- "Can't Stop (22nd Century Lifestyle)", by pre)Thing from 22nd Century Lifestyle

== See also ==
- Conan O'Brien Can't Stop, a documentary film
- Don't Stop (disambiguation)
