= Shout It Out (Mariette song) =

2020 song by Mariette Hansson

Single by Mariette Hansson
- Released: 22 February 2020
- Length: 3:01
- Label: Warner Music Sweden
- Songwriters: Thomas G:son; Cassandra Ströberg; Alex Shield; Mariette Hansson

Mariette Hansson singles chronology
"For You" (2018)	"Shout It Out" (2020)	"One Day" (2023)

"Shout It Out" is a song by Swedish singer Mariette. The song was performed for the first time in Melodifestivalen 2020, where it made it to the final. The song peaked at number 30 on the Swedish single chart.

== Charts ==
Chart (2020)	Peak position
Sweden (Sverigetopplistan)	30
