= JTR (band) =

Swedish boy band

- Origin: Sweden
- Genres: Pop
- Years active: 2012–2017
- Labels: Sony Music
- Members: John Andreasson; Tom Lundbäck; Robin Lundbäck

JTR is a Swedish boy band made up of John (born 1990), Tom Lundbäck (born 1993) and Robin Lundbäck (born 1994). The band's name is made up of the first letters of their given names John, Tom and Robin.

They appeared on the fifth season of The X Factor Australia a few months after becoming established in Australia. The fifth season of the Australian version premiered on the Seven Network on 29 July 2013. JTR finished seventh after being eliminated on 30 September 2013 of the show. Their debut album, Touchdown, was promoted by the band's debut single, "Ride". The album charted in both Australia and Sweden.

== Career ==
=== 2013: The X Factor Australia ===
JTR are originally from Sweden. They had reportedly just arrived the day they were scheduled to perform on The X Factor Australia where they auditioned with the Justin Bieber song "As Long as You Love Me", with added rapping lyrics. After two weeks staying safe interpreting Ed Sheeran and Kylie Minogue songs, in week three, JTR landed in the bottom two for the first time and had a showdown contest with Barry Southgate. As a result, JTR were saved by judges Natalie Bassingthwaighte, Redfoo, and Ronan Keating with Southgate being sent home. However, voting statistics revealed that Southgate received more votes than JTR, which meant that if Keating sent the result to deadlock, JTR would have been eliminated.

JTR were in the final showdown again in week four with Ellie Lovegrove. After the judges decision went to deadlock, it was revealed that Lovegrove had received the fewest votes and was eliminated, with JTR being saved yet again. JTR were eventually eliminated from the competition in week six following their performance of Hanson's "MMMBop", after Keating, Dannii Minogue and Redfoo chose to save Third Degree instead. JTR were the sixth contestant eliminated overall in the competition.

==== Performances on The X Factor ====
denotes week in the bottom two.
denotes eliminated.

Show	Theme	Song	Original artist	Order	Result
Audition	Free choice	"As Long as You Love Me"	Justin Bieber	N/A	Through to super bootcamp
Super bootcamp 1	N/A			N/A	Through to super bootcamp 2
Super bootcamp 2	Ensemble performance			N/A	Through to super bootcamp 3
Super bootcamp 3	N/A			N/A	Through to home visits
Home visits	Free choice	"Rich Girl"	Hall & Oates	N/A	Through to live shows
Week 1	Judges' Choice	"Everything Has Changed"	Ed Sheeran	8	Safe
Week 2	Legends	"Can't Get You Out of My Head"	Kylie Minogue	1	Safe
Week 3	Top 10 Hits	"Everybody Talks"	Neon Trees	6	Bottom two
Week 3	Save Me Song	"The Man Who Can't Be Moved"	The Script	1	Saved
Week 4	Latest and Greatest	"Want U Back"	Cher Lloyd	2	Bottom two (8th)
Week 4	Save Me Song	"Waiting on the World to Change"	John Mayer	2	Saved via deadlock
Week 5	Rock	"Thnks fr th Mmrs"	Fall Out Boy	7	Safe
Week 6	Family Heroes	"MMMBop"	Hanson	3	Bottom two
Week 6	Save Me Song	"Lego House"	Ed Sheeran	1	Eliminated (7th)

=== 2014–present: Touchdown and Melodifestivalen ===
JTR proved popular despite their early elimination. Their debut single "Ride" was released on 3 February 2014, through Trinity Recordings. "Ride" debuted at Number 2 on the Australian Independent Chart. JTR's debut studio album Touchdown followed on 7 March 2014, and debuted at number 44 on the ARIA Albums Chart.

With the release of their album, they also toured their home country Sweden with their album Touchdown through Sony Music Sweden. The album also charted in Sweden on Sverigetopplistan. It was announced in December 2014, that JTR would complete in the Melodifestivalen 2015, a Swedish music competition that would select Sweden's 55th entry for the Eurovision Song Contest 2015. Their song was called "Building It Up". The band made it to the final in Friends Arena.

== Discography ==
=== Studio albums ===
List of studio albums, with selected chart positions
Title	Album details	Peak chart positions		
Title	Album details	AUS	JPN	SWE
Touchdown	Released: 7 March 2014 (Australia); Label: Trinity Recordings; Formats: CD, digital download	44	—	25
Oh My My	Released: 26 August 2015 (Japan); Label: Sony Music; Formats: CD, digital download	—	128	—

=== Extended plays ===
List of studio albums, with selected chart positions
Title	Album details	Peak chart positions		
Title	Album details	AUS	JPN	SWE
Centre of Everywhere	Released: 1 May 2015; Label: Sony Music; Formats: CD, digital download	—	143	—

=== Singles ===
List of singles
Title	Year	Peak chart positions		Album
Title	Year	AUS	SWE	Album
"Ride"	2014	—	—	Touchdown
"Night for Life"	2014	—	—	Non-album singles
"Centre of Everywhere"	2015	—	—	Centre of Everywhere
"You'll Be Alright"	2016	—	—	Non-album singles
"If I Didn't Know Better"	2017	—	—	Non-album singles
"—" denotes a single that did not chart in that country.

=== Other charted songs ===
List of non-single songs, with selected chart positions and certifications
Title	Year	Peak chart positions	Certifications	Album
Title	Year	SWE	Certifications	Album
"Building It Up"	2015	33	GLF: Gold	Melodifestivalen 2015

=== Album appearances ===
List of album appearances
Title	Year	Album
"Building It Up"	2015	Melodifestivalen 2015
