= For You (Mariette song) =

- Single artwork. Art direction by Alexander Collin, Photography by Magnus Ragnvid.

Single by Mariette
- Released: February 2018
- Genre: Pop
- Length: 3:00
- Label: Warner Music Sweden
- Songwriter(s): Jörgen Elofsson

Mariette singles chronology
"A Million Years" (2017)	"For You" (2018)	"Shout It Out" (2020)

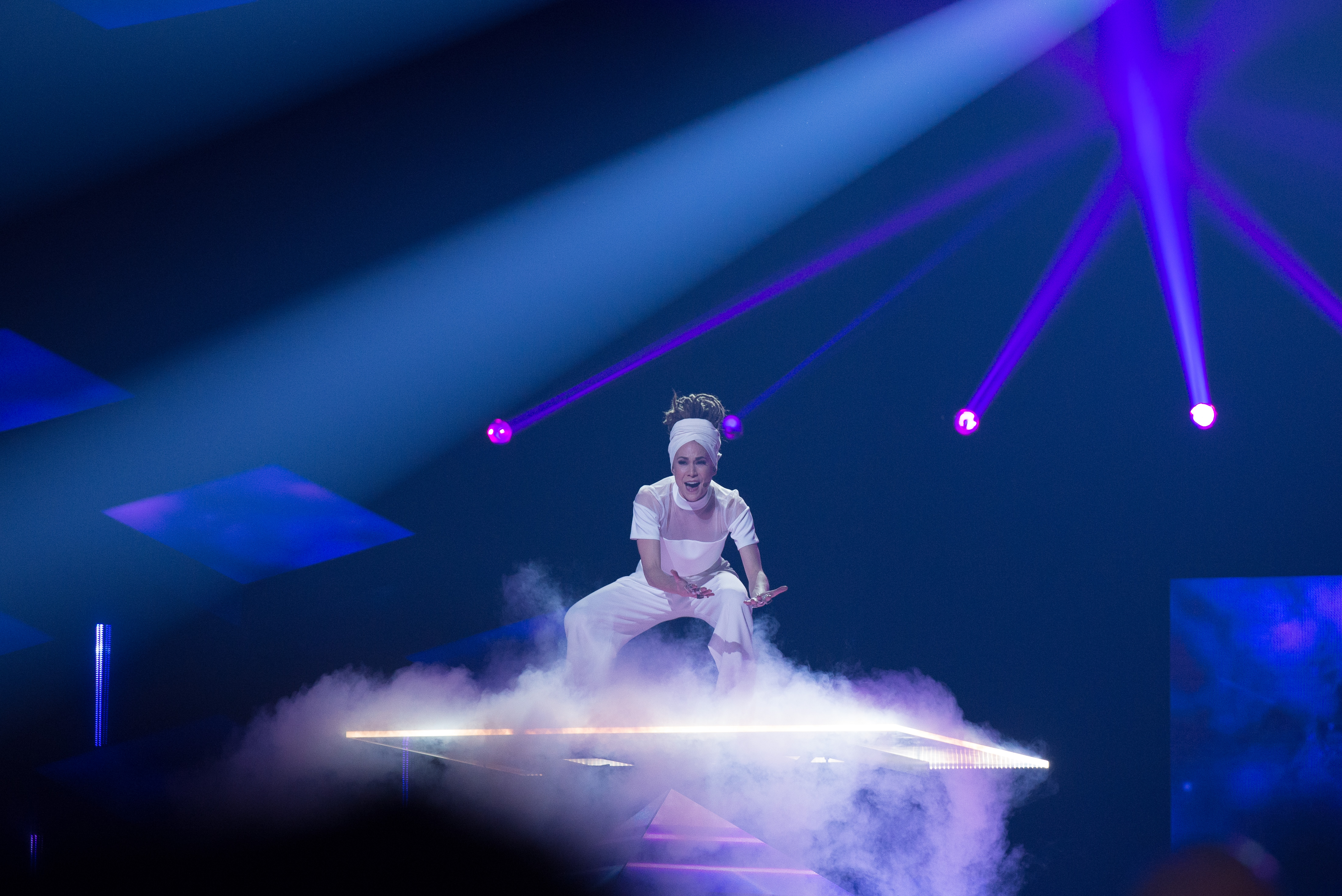
Mariette performing For You during Melodifestivalen 2018

"For You" is a song recorded by Swedish singer Mariette. The song was released as a digital download in February 2018. It took part in Melodifestivalen 2018, where it qualified to the final from the fourth semi-final, finishing in 5th place overall. The song is written by Jörgen Elofsson and peaked at number 13 on the Swedish single chart.

== Charts ==
Chart (2018)	Peak position
Sweden (Sverigetopplistan)	13
