= Jul i Hasses lada =

Studio album by Hasse Andersson
- Released: 1996
- Genre: Christmas, country
- Length: 52 minutes
- Label: Slowfox

Hasse Andersson chronology
Från mitt hjärta (1994)	Jul i Hasses lada (1996)	Den 14:e (1997)

Jul i Hasses lada is a 1996 Christmas album by Hasse Andersson, accompanied by the Kvinnaböske Band.

== Track listing ==
1. I julens tid – 4.12
2. Varje människa har ett ljus (Mary's Boy Child) – 2.56
3. Rudolf med röda mulen (Rudolph the Red-Nosed Reindeer) – 2.18
4. När julkvällen tänder sin stjärna – 3.45
5. Är det tomtebo tro? – 2.22
6. Nu tror du på tomten igen – 2.53
7. Min barndoms aftonbön – 4.30
8. Knalle Juls vals – 2.20
9. En vinter länge se'n – 3.37
10. Det brinner ett ljus – 3.48
11. Bjällerklang (Jingle Bells) – 2.20
12. Runda tomtar – 2.55
13. Jul i Gamla stan (Christmas in New York) – 3.21
14. Decembernatt – 3.38
15. Bella Notte – 2.41
16. Jul i Hasses lada – 2.23
17. Det är jul – 2.49
18. Tomtarnas julnatt – 2.45

== Other contributors ==
- Peter Berglund – keyboards
- Nisse Persson – bass
- Mathias Frisk – drums
- Johan Pihleke – guitar, mandolin, percussion
- Benny Lawin – alto saxophone
- Tommy Nilsson – accordion
