= A Million Years =

- Single artwork. Art direction by Alexander Collin, Photography by Magnus Ragnvid.

Single by Mariette
- Released: 26 February 2017
- Recorded: 2016
- Genre: Pop
- Length: 3:02
- Label: Parlophone Music Sweden
- Songwriter(s): Thomas G:son; Johanna Jansson; Peter Boström; Mariette Hansson; Jenny Hansson

Mariette singles chronology
"My Revolution" (2015)	"A Million Years" (2017)	"For You" (2018)

"A Million Years" is a song recorded by Swedish singer Mariette. The song was released as a digital download in Sweden on 26 February 2017 and peaked at number 26 on the Swedish Singles Chart. It took part in Melodifestivalen 2017, where it placed fourth in the final, and also won the OGAE Second Chance Contest 2017 for Sweden. It was written by Thomas G:son, Johanna Jansson, Peter Boström, Mariette Hansson, Jenny Hansson.

== Track listing ==
Digital download
No.	Title	Length
1.	"A Million Years"	3:02

== Chart performance ==
Chart (2017)	Peak position
Sweden (Sverigetopplistan)	16

== Release history ==
Region	Date	Format	Label
Sweden	26 February 2017	Digital download	Parlophone Music Sweden
