= Girl from Sweden =

Single by Eric Saade
- Released: 22 May 2015
- Recorded: 2015
- Genre: Pop
- Length: 3:45
- Label: Roxy Recordings
- Songwriter(s): Eric Saade; Michael Angelo; J-Son; Tonino Speciale

Eric Saade singles chronology
"Sting" (2015)	"Girl from Sweden" (2015)	"Colors" (2016)

"Girl from Sweden" is a song by Swedish singer Eric Saade. The song was released as a digital download on 22 May 2015 through Roxy Recordings. The song did not enter the Swedish Singles Chart, but peaked at number 1 on the Swedish Heatseeker Chart.

== Music video ==
A video to accompany the release of "Girl from Sweden" was first released onto YouTube on 22 May 2015 at a total length of three minutes and fifty-six seconds.

== Track listing ==
Digital download
No.	Title	Length
1.	"Girl from Sweden"	3:45
2.	"Girl from Sweden" (Instrumental)	3:45

== Charts ==
Chart (2015)	Peak position
Swedish Heatseeker Chart (Sverigetopplistan)	1

== Release history ==
Region	Date	Format	Label
Sweden	22 May 2015	Digital download	Roxy Recordings
