= Touchdown (JTR album) =

Studio album by JTR
- Released: 7 March 2014
- Recorded: 2013–2014
- Genre: Pop
- Label: MGM (Australia); Sony Music (Sweden)

JTR chronology
Touchdown (2014)	Oh My My (2015)

Singles from Touchdown
- 1. "Ride" Released: March 2014

Swedish cover
- Swedish version

Touchdown is the debut studio album by Swedish boy band JTR. It was released by MGM in Australia on 7 March 2014 immediately following their debut single "Ride", which was released after they finished in seventh place in season 5 of the Australian version of The X Factor. It peaked at number 44 on the ARIA Albums Chart.

After the band's tour in Sweden, the album was released there on 5 November 2014 through Sony Music Entertainment, entering the Swedish Albums Chart at number 52, while peaking at number 25.

== Track listing ==
1. "Touchdown" – 3:38
2. "Never" – 2:58
3. "Ride" – 3:10
4. "Thinking Bout Ya" – 3:27
5. "Movie Star" – 3:00
6. "I'm in Love" – 2:58
7. "Save It" – 2:45
8. "I Want What I Can't Have" – 3:45
9. "Something You Gotta Do" – 2:54
10. "Before You Go" – 2:46
11. "Drive On By" – 3:14
12. "Shut Out the Lies" – 3:39
13. "Until Then" – 3:20
14. "Leave with Me" – 3:30

== Charts ==
Chart (2013)	Peak position
Australian Albums (ARIA)	44
Australian Independent Albums (AIR)	9
Swedish Albums (Sverigetopplistan)	25
