= Kalle Johansson (singer) =

Swedish singer

Kalle Johansson (born 1997 in Söderåkra) is a Swedish singer. Johansson participated in Melodifestivalen 2015 in the third semifinal with the song "För din skull". He earned a spot in the contest after winning Sveriges Radio's P4 radio competition Svensktoppen Nästa with his song "Den där dan".
