= Emelie Irewald =

Swedish singer (born 1984)

- Born: Emelie Sandra Josefin Irewald; 15 June 1984 (age 41); Stockholm, Sweden
- Years active: 2011–

Emelie Sandra Josefin Irewald (born 15 June 1984) is a Swedish singer.

Irewald was born in Stockholm. In 2011 she participated in the singing competition True Talent which was broadcast on TV3. In the competition she placed fourth. Irewald participated in Melodifestivalen 2015 with the song "Där och då med dig" which she wrote herself. The song did not qualify from its heat.

During a few months in her teens she dated True Talent coach and singer Danny Saucedo, though during the competition Irewald chose the Tommy Körberg team.
