= Guld och gröna skogar =

Single by Hasse Andersson

from the album Guld och gröna skogar
- Released: 2015
- Genre: country
- Songwriter(s): Johan Bejerholm, Johan Deltinger, Elin Wrethov, Anderz Wrethov

Guld och gröna skogar (Gold and Green Forests) is a song written by Johan Bejerholm, Johan Deltinger, Elin Wrethov and Anderz Wrethov, and performed by Hasse Andersson at Melodifestivalen 2015, where the song ended up 4th in the final. The song was performed again during the interval act of the Second Chance round of Melodifestivalen 2016 in Halmstad.

Based on the song's commercial success, Andersson released his 2015 similarly titled album in March 2015.

There have been controversies about the song's supposed similarity with the Japanese song "Tanabata Matsuri" from the group Tegomass, which got released in 2007.

== Charts ==
=== Weekly charts ===
Chart (2015)	Peak position
Sweden (Sverigetopplistan)	3

=== Year-end charts ===
Chart (2015)	Position
Sweden (Sverigetopplistan)	50
