= Annika Herlitz =

Swedish singer, musical performer, and voice actress

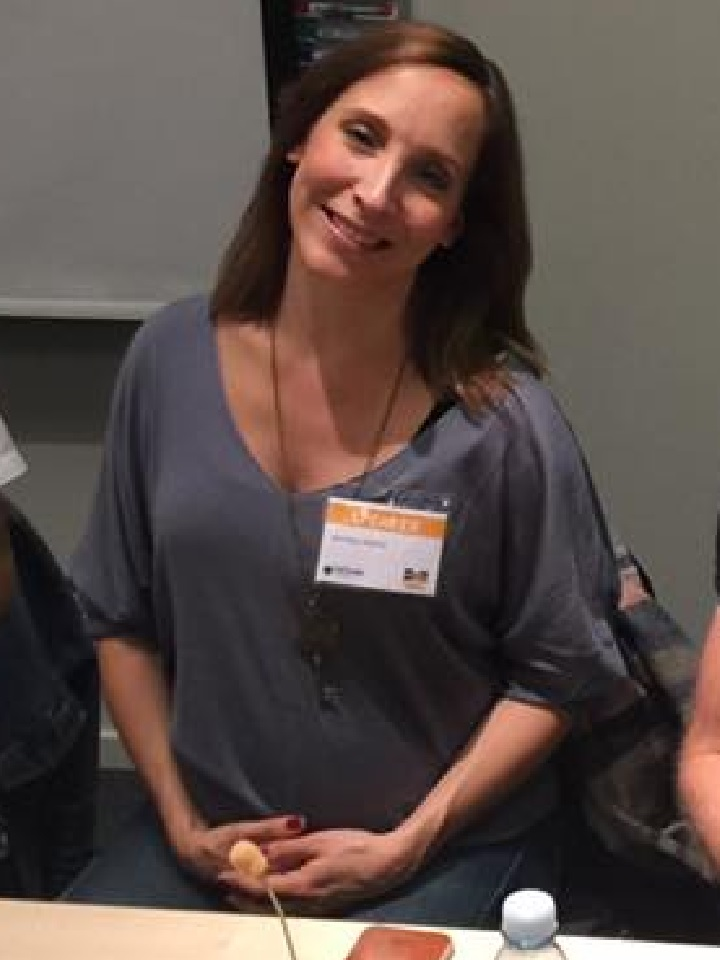
- Annika Herlitz during the Kista Convention in September 2017
- Website: annikaherlitz.se

Annika Herlitz (born 22 September 1984) is a Swedish singer, musical performer, and voice actress. She provided the Swedish voice for the snow queen Elsa in the Walt Disney film Frozen. The film was released in Sweden on 31 January 2014. Herlitz performed the Frozen song Let It Go at Allsång på Skansen.

Herlitz participated in Melodifestivalen 2015 with the song "Ett andetag".

== Discography ==
=== Singles ===
Title	Year	Peak chart positions	Album
Title	Year	SWE	Album
"Ett andetag"	2015	—	Non-album singles
