= Behrang Miri =

Swedish-Iranian rapper, actor, comedian (born 1984)

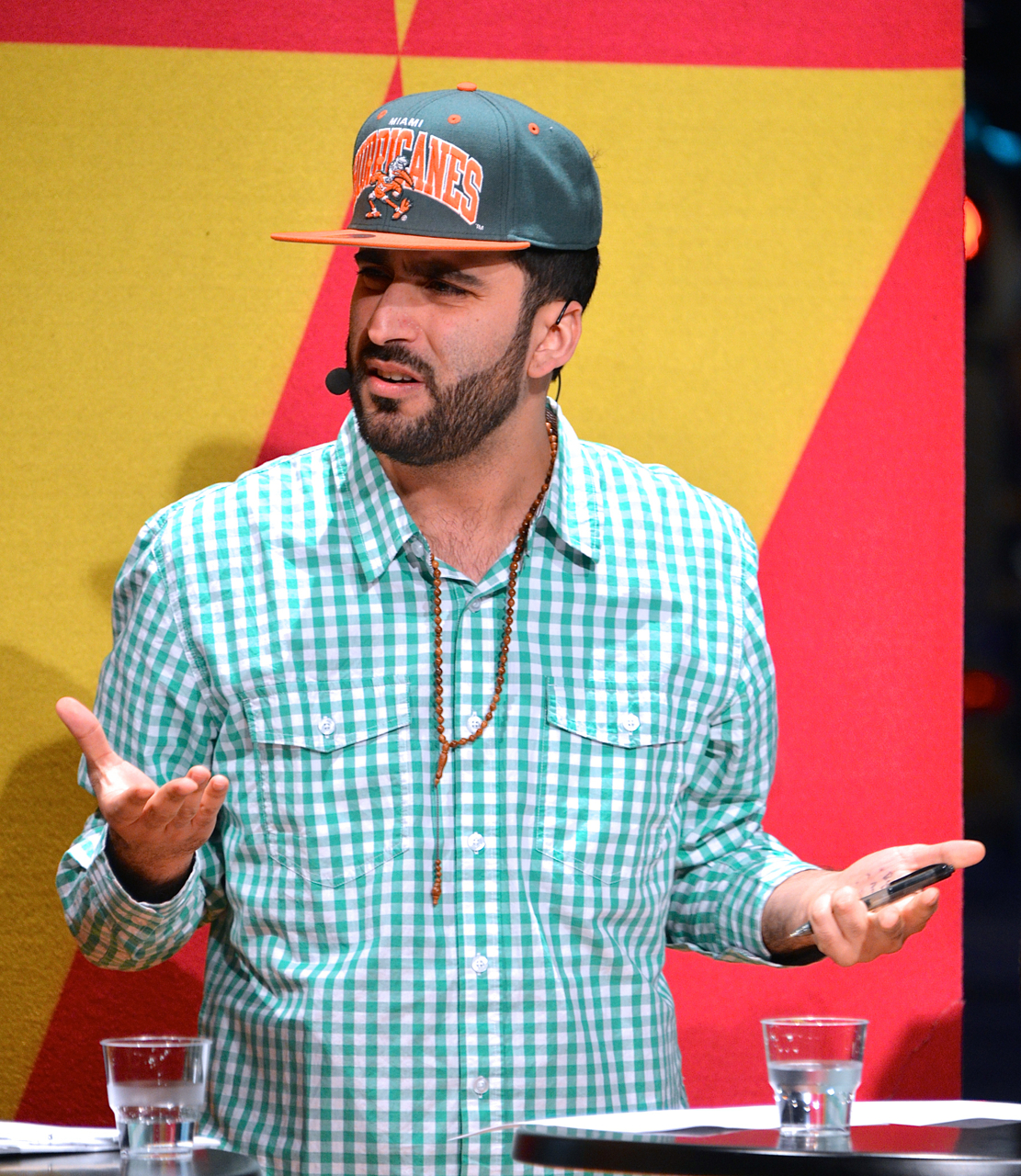
- Behrang Miri in 2014 at a cultural debate at Kulturhuset Stadsteatern

Background information
- Born: Behrang Miri; January 17, 1984 (age 42); Iran
- Origin: Lund, Sweden
- Genre: Rap

Seyed Behrang Miri (Persian: بهرنگ میری; born in Iran on 17 January 1984) is a Swedish rapper, songwriter and actor of Iranian origin.

== Early life ==
He moved to Sweden with his parents in 1987 when he was just three. He grew up in Lund. In 2008, he took part in theater production Zlatans leende in Malmö City Theatre. The same year, he was picked as the face for MKB, Räddningstjänsten featured in City Malmö newspaper and named "Årets glädjespridare" by Malmö Municipality. In 2011 he won the Nationalencyklopedin's annual Kunskapspriset (Knowledge Awards) alongside Emerich Roth.

== Career ==
He has been involved in a number of youth projects, in Skåne and later in Stockholm. In 2011, he became an artistic director of cultural activities for children for Kåldolmens Day events in Stockholm working with various cultural groups. On September 25, 2012, he used his position to demand removal of a number of books he deemed objectionable (racist, homophobic, etc.) including his suggestion to transfer the Tintin series from the children's section of the library at Kulturhuset (Culture House) His campaign backfired and he was widely criticized prompting him to announce his withdrawal from responsibilities as artistic director. He has also worked with Swedish Kurdish stand-up comedian Özz Nûjen.

== Melodifestivalen ==
On 23 February 2013, Miri competed as an artist in Melodifestivalen 2013 in a bid to represent Sweden in Eurovision Song Contest 2013 to be held in Stockholm. His song was "Jalla Dansa Sawa" (meaning Come on and dance together) with Loulou Lamotte and Oscar Zia as backing vocal artists. It was co-written by Behrang Miri, Anderz Wrethov, Firas Razak Tuma and Tacfarinas Yamoun. The song came 3rd/4th in the semi-final, he moved to "Second Chance" round where on 3 March 2013, he faced Anton Ewald and his song "Begging" and was eliminated.

Despite his failure to reach the finals of Melodifestivalen, his song proved very popular and was released as a single entering the Sverigetopplistan, the official Swedish Singles Chart at number 8 just one week after elimination. Eventually it climbed up to number 4 in the chart.

In 2015, he took part again in Melodifestivalen 2015 and qualified to Andra Chansen (Second Chance) round through the first semi-final on 7 February 2015, but failed to make it to the Melodifestivalen final.

== Discography ==
=== Singles ===
Title	Year	Peak chart positions	Certifications	Album
Title	Year	SWE	Certifications	Album
"Jalla Dansa Sawa"	2013	4	GLF: Platinum	Non-album singles
"C'est comme ça / Jag ser dig"	2013	—		Non-album singles
"Det rår vi inte för" (featuring Victor Crone)	2015	69		Non-album singles
"—" denotes a single that did not chart or was not released in that territory.
