= Forever Starts Today =

Single by Linus Svenning
- Released: 14 February 2015
- Length: 2:58
- Label: Stockhouse
- Songwriter(s): Aleena Gibson; Anton Malmberg Hård af Segerstad; Fredrik Kempe

Linus Svenning singles chronology
"Bröder" (2014)	"Forever Starts Today" (2015)

"Forever Starts Today" is a song by Swedish singer Linus Svenning. The song took part in Melodifestivalen 2015 and qualified to the final through Andra Chansen (Second Chance) round after finishing 4th in the second semi-final on 14 February 2015. On 7 March 2015 it finished 6th out of 12 in Melodifestivalen final.

== Charts ==
Chart (2013)	Peak position
Sweden (Sverigetopplistan)	12
