= Hello Hi =

Single by Dolly Style
- Released: 7 February 2015
- Length: 2:58
- Label: Capitol Music Group
- Songwriter(s): Emma Nors; Palle Hammarlund; Jimmy Jansson

Dolly Style singles chronology
| "Hello Hi" (2015) | "Cherry Gum" (2015) |

"Hello Hi" is the debut single by Swedish girl group Dolly Style. The song was taken part in Melodifestivalen 2015 and qualified to Andra Chansen (Second Chance) through the first semi-final on 7 February 2015, but failed to make it to the Melodifestivalen final.

== Charts ==
Chart performance for "Hello Hi"
| Chart (2015) | Peak position |
|---|---|
| Sweden (Sverigetopplistan) | 32 |

== Certifications ==
Certifications for "Hello Hi"
| Region | Certification | Certified units/sales |
|---|---|---|
| Sweden (GLF) | Platinum | 40,000^{‡} |
^{‡} Sales+streaming figures based on certification alone.
