= Dolly Style =

Swedish Europop group

- Dolly Style at Viking Line (left to right: Yolly, Molly, holly and Polly)

Background information
- Origin: Sweden
- Genres: Eurodance; Europop; Hi-NRG; nu-disco; bubblegum pop
- Years active: 2014–present
- Label: Capitol Music Group Sweden
- Members: Mikaela Samuelsson (2015–2019, 2024–present); Vilma Davidsson (2018–present); Caroline Aronsson (2018–present); Madeleine Darwich (2026–present)
- Past members: Alexandra Salomonsson (2014–2018); Carolina Magnell (2014–2015); Emma Pucek (2014–2015); Marielle Myhrberg (2015–2016); Sarah von Reis (2016–2018); Linnéa Källström (2019–2021); Annie Moreau (2021–2026)
- Website: dollystyle.se

Dolly Style is a Swedish girl group created by Emma Nors and Palle Hammarlund. It features four girls going by Molly, Holly, Polly and Yolly. In-universe, the quartet originates from a dollhouse in Dollyville. The group is inspired by the kawaii aesthetic from Japanese subcultures, such as fairy kei, gyaru and lolita. The group has participated in Melodifestivalen four times: 2015 with "Hello Hi", 2016 with "Rollercoaster", 2019 with "Habibi", and 2025 with "Yihaa".

== Career ==
=== 2014–2019: Three Melodifestivalen participations ===
Dolly Style was formed in the summer of 2014 by Emma Nors and Palle Hammarlund under Capitol Records Sweden. The group participated in the first heat of Melodifestivalen 2015 with the song "Hello Hi", qualifying to the repechage but failing to advance to the final.

Following the competition, they were accused by Remixed Records of having plagiarized the virtual group the Caramella Girls. The claims were denied by the group's manager.

On 5 April 2015, it was announced that Emma Pucek had left the group, and that she had been replaced by Marielle Myhrberg, who would continue playing the character of Polly. In 2019, Pucek would come forward with allegations of abuse against the creators of the group.

In May 2015, they released the single "Cherry Gum". On 16 September 2015, they released the single "Upsy Daisy". In November 2015, it was announced Carolina Magnell had left the band for personal reasons, and she was replaced with Mikaela Samuelsson who would continue playing the character Molly.

In November 2015, it was announced that Dolly Style would participate in Melodifestivalen 2016 with the song "Rollercoaster". Like the previous year, they qualified to the repechage from their heat, but failed to qualify for the final.

In August 2016, Marielle Myhrberg announced that she would be leaving Dolly Style. On 12 September 2016, Sarah von Reis was announced as her replacement. In October 2016, they released another single, "Young and Restless".

On 18 November 2018, Sarah von Reis appeared to make an announcement that she was leaving the group voluntarily. However, this post was not written by her, yet published in her name; as she had been fired from the group on short notice and replaced by Caroline Aronsson.

Dolly Style participated in Melodifestivalen 2019 with the song "Habibi", but failed to advance from the third heat, finishing in fifth place.

=== 2019–present: Documentary series, Melodifestivalen comeback ===
In February 2019, SVT released the documentary series Dolly Style-fabriken ("The Dolly Style factory") that explored the formation of the group. In the documentary, several former members came forward with allegations of abuse towards founders Emma Nors and Palle Hammarlund. The founders deny the allegations, calling it a smear campaign.

On 19 June 2019, Mikaela Samuelsson announced that she was leaving the group.

Linnea Källström joined the group in September 2019 and later left in July 2021. Annie Moreau joined the group in August 2021.

On 24 December 2023, Mikaela Samuelsson, who previously played Molly, was announced as having returned to Dolly Style as a new character, Yolly.

On 26 November 2024, it was announced that Dolly Style would compete in Melodifestivalen 2025. Their entry, "Yihaa", competed in the third heat of the contest, and qualified to the final via the repechage. This marked the first time that Dolly Style advanced to the final. They placed fifth in the final of the contest on 8 March 2025.

== Discography ==
=== EPs ===
Title	Year
"Moonlight"	2017
"Sunrise"	2019

=== Singles ===
Title	Year	Peak chart positions	Certifications
Title	Year	SWE	Certifications
"Hello Hi"	2015	32	GLF: Platinum
"Cherry Gum"	2015	—	GLF: Gold
"Upsy Daisy"	2015	—	
"Rollercoaster"	2016	27	GLF: Platinum
"Unicorns & Ice Cream"	2016	—	
"Young & Restless"	2016	—	
"Tänd ett ljus"	2016	—	
"Bye Bye Bby Boo"	2017	—	
"L-O-V-E"	2018	—	
"Hush Little Baby (VIP) (feat. Molly)"	2018	—	
"Red Lights (feat. Holly)"	2018	—	
"B-A-B-Y (feat. Polly)"	2018	—	
"Habibi"	2019	8	GLF: 2× Platinum
"How Far I'll Go"	2019	—	
"Sayonara"	2019	—	
"Frkn Perfect"	2020	—	
"Boom Boom Box"	2020	—	
"Open Your Arms (It's Xmas)"	2020	—	
"Kick It & Break It"	2020	—	
"We R"	2021	—	
"Christmas Lights"	2021	—	
"Bam Bam"	2022	— (Note: "Bam Bam" did not enter the Swedish Singellista Chart, but peaked at number four on the Swedish Heatseeker Chart.)	GLF: Gold
"Dance 'Til Tomorrow"	2023	—	
"Jump"	2023	—	
"Mi Amor"	2023	—	
"Girls Girls Girls"	2024	—	
"Mermaid"	2024	—	
"Yihaa"	2025	2	GLF: Platinum
"Mayday"	2026	—	
"—" denotes a single that did not chart or was not released in that territory.
