= Hasse Andersson =

Swedish country singer and songwriter

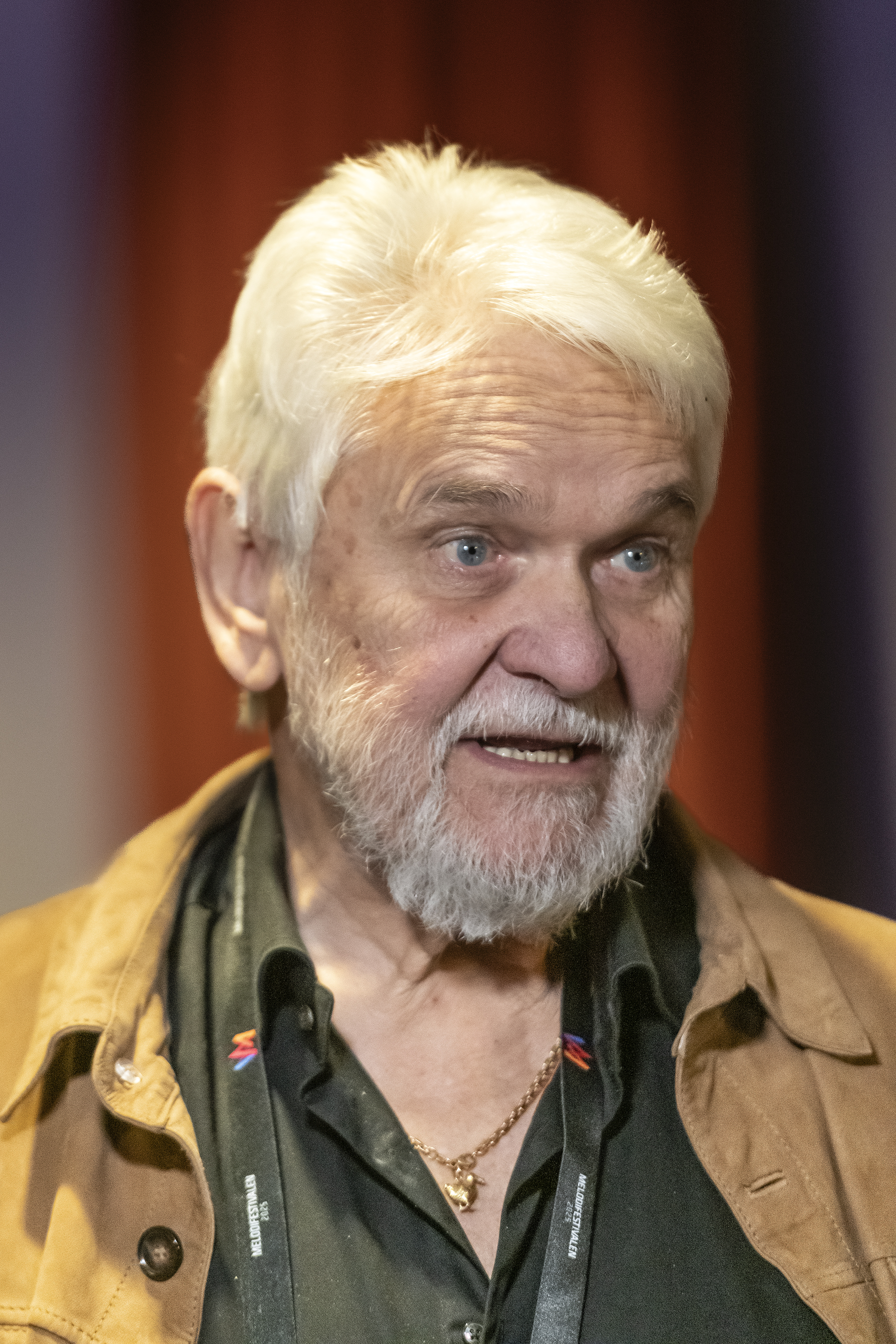
- Andersson in 2025

Background information
- Born: Hans Olle Lennart Andersson; 28 January 1948 (age 78); Malmö, Sweden
- Genres: country
- Occupations: singer, songwriter
- Instruments: vocals, guitar
- Years active: 1979–present
- Labels: Sonet; Slowfox
- Member of: Kvinnaböske band
- Website: kvinnaboskemusik.se/om-hasse.html

Hans Olle Lennart Andersson (born 28 January 1948) is a Swedish country singer and songwriter, whose albums had chart success in Sweden during the 1980s.

He took part in Melodifestivalen 2015 in a bid to represent Sweden in Eurovision Song Contest 2015 with "Guld och gröna skogar". He came 3rd in semi-final 4, which took place on 28 February 2015 in Örebro, and qualified for the Second Chance round (andra chansen) on 7 March 2015, where he dueled against Kristin Amparo. He won the duel and thus went to the final, where he finished 4th with at total of 78 points, of which 10 came from the international juries and the remaining 68 from the voters in Sweden.

On 30 September 2016, Sveriges Television (SVT) announced that Andersson will host all six shows of Melodifestivalen 2017 alongside Clara Henry and David Lindgren.

== Discography ==
=== Albums ===
Year	Album	Peak positions	Certification
Year	Album	SWE	Certification
1982	Annat var det förr (as Hasse & Kvinnaböske Band)	28	
1982	Änglahund (as Hasse & Kvinnaböske Band)	7	
1983	Höstens sista blomma (as Hasse & Kvinnaböske Band)	12	
1984	Med lånde låtar och vänner till hjälp (as Hasse Andersson)	42	
1985	Höstens sista blomma (as Hasse Andersson & Kvinnaböske Band)	35	
1986	Jul i kvinnaböske	27	
1987	Mellan himmel och jord	40	
1996	Jul i Hasses lada	–	style="text-align:center;"
2002	Änglahund – en samling	14	
2015	Guld och gröna skogar	1	
2015	Den bästa julen – En samling	12	
2016	Det bästa	10	

=== Singles ===
Year	Single	Peak positions	Album
Year	Single	SWE	Album
2015	"Guld och gröna skogar"	3	Melodifestivalen 2015; Guld och gröna skogar
