= Sting (Eric Saade song) =

Single by Eric Saade
- Released: 1 March 2015
- Recorded: 2014
- Genre: Pop
- Length: 3:00
- Label: Roxy Recordings
- Songwriter(s): Sam Arash Fahmi; Fredrik Kempe; Hamed "K-One" Pirouzpanah; David Kreuger
- Producer(s): Jason Gill

Eric Saade singles chronology
"Take a Ride (Put 'Em in the Air" (2014)	"Sting" (2015)	"Girl from Sweden" (2015)

"Sting" is a 2015 song by Swedish singer Eric Saade. He was participating with the song in Melodifestivalen 2015 in a bid to represent Sweden in the Eurovision Song Contest 2015 in Vienna, Austria. The song is co-written by Sam Arash Fahmi, Fredrik Kempe, Hamed "K-one" Pirouzpanah and David Kreuger. Saade performed the song live during the first semi-final round of Melodifestivalen on 7 February 2015 in Gothenburg's Scandinavium. Coming first/second that day, he qualified to the Finals held on 14 March 2015 in Stockholm where he came fifth overall after the televoting and jury results was revealed.

In 2017, Uno Svenningsson released a Swedish-language version of the song titled "Slå" as a part of the eighth season of Så mycket bättre.

== Track listing ==
Digital download
No.	Title	Length
1.	"Sting" (TV Version)	3:00
2.	"Sting" (Radio Edit)	2:50

== Chart performance ==
=== Weekly charts ===
Chart (2015)	Peak position
Sweden (Sverigetopplistan)	5

=== Year-end charts ===
Chart (2015)	Position
Sweden (Sverigetopplistan)	95

== Certifications ==
Certifications for Sting
Region	Certification	Certified units/sales
Sweden (GLF)	2× Platinum	80,000^{‡}
^{‡} Sales+streaming figures based on certification alone.

== Release history ==
Region	Date	Format	Label
Sweden	1 March 2015	Digital download	Roxy Recordings
