= Don't Stop (Isa song) =

Single by Isa Tengblad
- Released: 2015
- Genre: Pop
- Length: 2:55
- Label: Sony Music Sweden
- Songwriter(s): Isa Tengblad; Johan Ramström; Gustaf Svenungsson; Magnus Wallin; Oscar Merner

Isa Tengblad singles chronology
| "What We Are" (2014) | "Don't Stop" (2015) | "Drum & Bass" (2015) |

"Don't Stop" is a song written by Isa Tengblad, Johan Ramström, Gustaf Svenungsson, Magnus Wallin, Oscar Merner, and performed by singer Isa at Melodifestivalen 2015, where it made it to the final, finishing in seventh place. The official music video was released on ISA's YouTube channel on 10 March 2015, where it currently has over 1 million views.

== Charts ==
| Chart (2015) | Peak position |
|---|---|
| Sweden (Sverigetopplistan) | 14 |
| Turkey (Number One Top 100) | 12 |
