= Magnus Wallin =

Swedish video artist

Magnus Wallin (born 1965 in Kåseberga, Löderup) is a Swedish video artist, working with 3D animation. He is best known for the short film "Exit" (1997).

He participated in the 2001 Venice Biennale.

== Notable works ==
- Anon (2004)
- Anatomic Flop (2003)
- Exercise Parade (2001)
- Skyline (2000)
- Exit (1997)
- Go pucko go (1996)
