= Victor Crone =

Swedish singer and guitarist (born 1992)

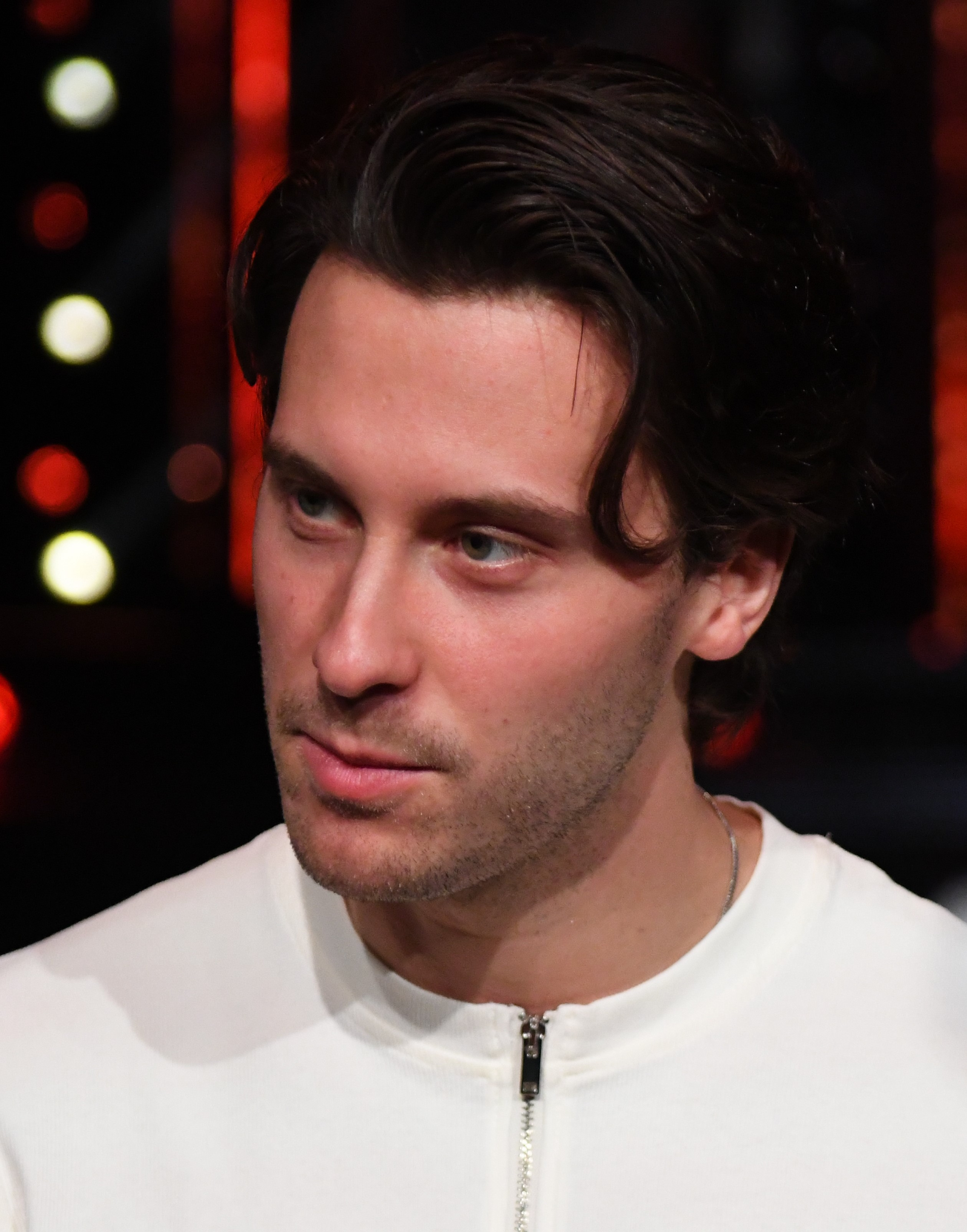
- Crone at Melodifestivalen 2020 in Malmö

Background information
- Also known as: Victor Crone
- Born: Victor Fritz-Crone; 31 January 1992 (age 34); Österåker, Sweden
- Genres: Dance pop, pop-rock, electro dance, folktronica
- Occupation: Singer
- Instruments: Vocals; guitar
- Years active: 2014–present
- Label: Roxy Recordings

Victor Fritz-Crone (born 31 January 1992), also known as Victor Crone, or Vic Heart is a Swedish singer, guitarist and songwriter. He represented Estonia in the Eurovision Song Contest 2019 in Tel Aviv with the song "Storm".

== Biography ==
Victor Crone was born and raised in Österåker, Sweden. He started playing guitar and writing songs at the age of 15. When he was 18 he moved to Los Angeles and Nashville to write songs with acclaimed artists such as Diane Warren, Desmond Child and Eric Bazilian. He performed in some international music conference centers of Los Angeles and he also released a song "Jimmy Dean" under his name Vic Heart.

In 2015, Victor released his debut single "Burning Man". He participated in Melodifestivalen 2015, featuring in the Behrang Miri song "Det rår vi inte för", which failed to qualify from the Andra Chansen round, losing to Samir & Viktor. On 16 February 2019, Victor Crone won the Estonian national selection Eesti Laul with the song "Storm" and he received the right to represent Estonia in the Eurovision Song Contest 2019, held in Tel Aviv, Israel. On 15 May, he qualified to the final. In the final Victor Crone placed 20th.

In November 2019, it was revealed that Crone joined the 2020 lineup for Melodifestivalen 2020. With his song, "Troubled Waters", he qualified to the finale from the fourth semifinal. He finished in ninth place, scoring a total of 57 points.

In November 2022, Crone was revealed to compete in Melodifestivalen 2023 with the song, "Diamonds". During the second round of the first heat, Crone placed second with 80 points and advanced to the second chance semi final, where he placed sixth overall with 28 points and was eliminated.

== Discography ==
=== Studio albums ===
Title	Details
Troubled Waters	Released: 22 February 2020; Label: Roxy Recordings, Playground; Format: digital download

=== Singles ===
Title	Year	Peak chart positions					Album
Title	Year	SWE	EST	SCO	SWI	UK Down.	Album
"Jimmy Dean" (as Vic Heart)	2014	—	—	—	—	—	Non-album singles
"Burning Man"	2015	—	—	—	—	—	Non-album singles
"Det rår vi inte för" (with Behrang Miri)	2015	69	—	—	—	—	Melodifestivalen 2015
"Feelgood Day"	2016	—	—	—	—	—	Non-album singles
"Cadillac" (with Maximani)	2016	—	—	—	—	—	Non-album singles
"California"	2017	—	—	—	—	—	Non-album singles
"Sunshine and Rain"	2017	—	—	—	—	—	Non-album singles
"Coming Up" (with Tungevaag & Raaban)	2017	—	—	—	—	—	Non-album singles
"Made Of"	2018	—	—	—	—	—	Non-album singles
"Storm"	2019	39	1	56	91	59	Eurovision Song Contest: Tel Aviv 2019
"Discovery" (with Syn Cole)	2019	—	—	—	—	—	Non-album singles
"Take Me Away" (with Tungevaag & Raaban)	2019	— (Note: "Take Me Away" did not enter the Swedish Singellista Chart, but peaked at number three on the Swedish Heatseeker Chart.)	—	—	—	—	Non-album singles
"This Can't Be Love"	2019	—	—	—	—	—	Troubled Waters
"Troubled Waters"	2020	17	—	—	—	—	Troubled Waters
"Yes, I Will Wait"	2020	—	—	—	—	—	TBA
"These Days (Longing for Christmas)"	2020	—	—	—	—	—	TBA
"Rains"	2021	—	—	—	—	—	TBA
"Waiting on Your Love"	2021	—	—	—	—	—	TBA
"Love Someone Like Me"	2021	—	—	—	—	—	TBA
"Wind in My Sails"	2022	—	—	—	—	—	TBA
"Dynamite"	2022	—	—	—	—	—	TBA
"Lonely World" (with K-391)	2022	—	—	—	—	—	TBA
"Diamonds"	2023	84	—	—	—	—	Melodifestivalen 2023
"Twentyfourseven"	2023	—	—	—	—	—	TBA
"All Time Love"	2023	—	—	—	—	—	TBA
"—" denotes a release that did not chart or was not released in that territory.

Preceded by Elina Nechayeva with "La forza"	Estonia in the Eurovision Song Contest; 2019	Succeeded by Uku Suviste with "What Love Is"
