= Det rår vi inte för =

Single by Behrang Miri featuring Victor Crone
- Released: 7 February 2015
- Genre: Rap, Pop
- Length: 3:00
- Songwriters: Behrang Miri, Albin Johnsén, Måns Zelmerlöw, Tony Nilsson

Behrang Miri singles chronology
"C'est comme ça / Jag ser dig" (2014)	"Det rår vi inte för" (2015)

Victor Crone singles chronology
"Burning Man" (2015)	"Det rår vi inte för" (2015)	"Feelgood Day" (2016)

"Det rår vi inte för" is a song by Swedish rapper, songwriter and actor of Iranian origin Behrang Miri featuring the vocals of Victor Crone. The song is taking part in Melodifestivalen 2015 and qualified to Andra Chansen (Second Chance) round through the first semi-final on 7 February 2015. where it was put in a duel with Samir & Viktor song "Groupie", but failed to move on to the finals of the competition.
