= Midnight Boy =

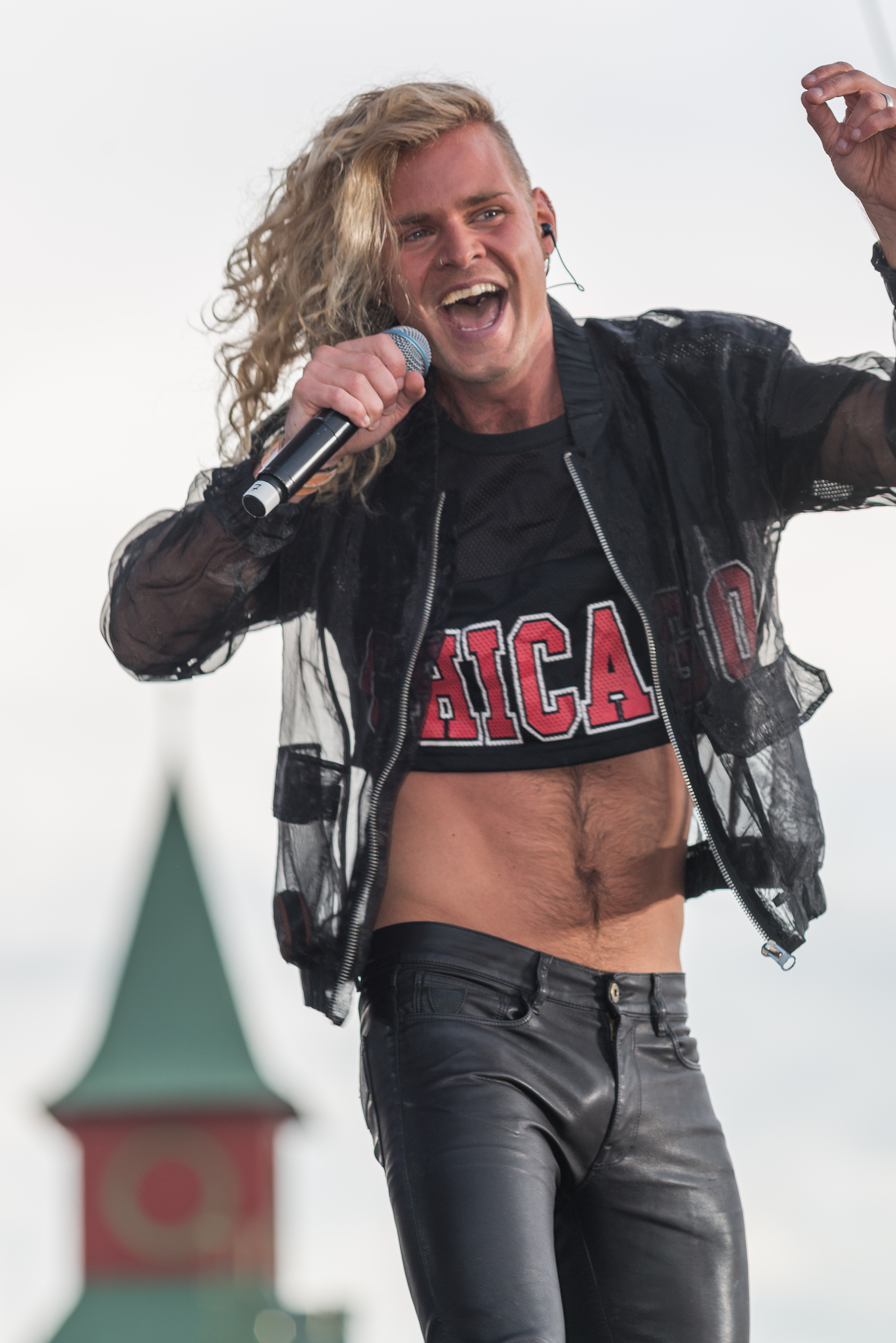
- Midnight Boy at Stockholm Pride 2015

Background information
- Also known as: Johan Krafman
- Born: Johan Petter Gustafsson; April 6, 1988 (age 38); Helsingborg, Sweden
- Genres: Electropop
- Occupations: singer; songwriter
- Years active: 2008–present
- Labels: 100 Songs, Stereoscope Music
- Website: midnightboy.se

Johan Petter Krafman better known by his stage name Midnight Boy (born 6 April 1988 in Helsingborg, Sweden) is a Swedish singer and songwriter. His music is strongly inspired by 1980s electropop and rock.

== Career ==
Krafman's career started in the summer of 2008 when he participated in the talent show Artistjakten by Mix Megapol, a Swedish national radio station. Winning the competition, he was awarded a record deal with Universal. He also performed at the Ladies Night shows in Stockholm, Gothenburg and Malmö with the singer Martin Stenmarck, actor Peter Stormare and comedian Henrik Hjelt. In connection with the Ladies Night tour he released two songs called "Disarmed" and "Chain Reaction" under his regular name. The songs were written and produced by Tony Nilsson and Peter Boström.

In 2013, Midnight Boy released the single "Roll With It" using his newly adopted stage name. The single was released by the newly started record company 100 Songs, specializing solely in single releases. The song took Midnight Boy to a mini tour to United States, where he performed at the Avalon club in Los Angeles. Also in 2013, Midnight Boy released the single "When You're Strange" with a controversial music video, where he took off all of his clothes at Stureplan with the slogan "When naked, there is no difference". He also worked with several songwriters and record producers.

Midnight Boy participated in the fourth semi-final of Melodifestivalen 2015 with the song "Don't Say No". The song did not get further in the competition, but charted in Sverigetopplistan making it his first charting single in the official Swedish Singles Chart.

== Discography ==
=== Singles ===
Title	Year	Peak chart positions	Certifications	Album
Title	Year	SWE	Certifications	Album
"Disarmed"	2008	—		Non-album singles
"Chain Reaction"	2009	—		Non-album singles
"Roll With It"	2013	—		Non-album singles
"When You're Strange"	2013	—		Non-album singles
"Don't Say No"	2015	90		Non-album singles
"—" denotes a single that did not chart or was not released in that territory.
