= Gonna Make Ya Move (Don't Stop) =

Single by Pink
- Released: November 9, 1998
- Genre: House, trance
- Label: Activ Records
- Songwriter(s): L. Carpella, F. Scandolari
- Producer(s): Mark Summers

"Gonna Make Ya Move (Don't Stop)" is a house/trance song written by L. Carpella and F. Scandolari, and recorded by Pink as their first single. It was remixed by Mark Summers at Scorccio Records and released in 1998 by Activ Records in the United Kingdom and by Color Records in the Netherlands (see 1998 in music). No music video was released. The single reached number 196 on the UK Singles Chart in February 1999, remaining on the top 200 for one week. Do not confuse with the singer P!nk, born Alecia Moore.

== Track listing ==
1. "Gonna Make Ya Move (Don't Stop)" [radio edit]
2. "Gonna Make Ya Move (Don't Stop)" [Scirocco Remix]
