= One Day (Mariette song) =

Single by Mariette
- Released: 25 February 2023
- Length: 2:55
- Label: Universal Music
- Songwriters: Jimmy Jansson; Mariette Hansson; Thomas G:son
- Producers: Jimmy Jansson; Thomas G:son

Mariette singles chronology
"Shout It Out" (2020)	"One Day" (2023)

"One Day" is a song by Swedish singer Mariette, released as a single on 25 February 2023. It was performed in Melodifestivalen 2023.

== Charts ==
Chart performance for "One Day"
Chart (2023)	Peak position
Sweden (Sverigetopplistan)	34
