= Möt mig i Gamla stan =

Single by Magnus Carlsson
- Released: 1 March 2015
- Genre: Pop; schlager
- Length: 3:03
- Label: Lighthouse Music; Universal Music Sweden
- Songwriter(s): Thomas G:son; Lina Eriksson

Magnus Carlsson singles chronology
"Tillsammans" (2014)	"Möt mig i Gamla stan" (2015)

"Möt mig i Gamla stan" (English: Meet me in Gamla stan) is a song written by Thomas G:son and Lina Eriksson, and performed by Magnus Carlsson at Melodifestivalen 2015, where the song ended up 9th in the final.

== Chart positions ==
Chart (2015)	Peak position
Sweden (Sverigetopplistan)	34
