= Rickard Söderberg =

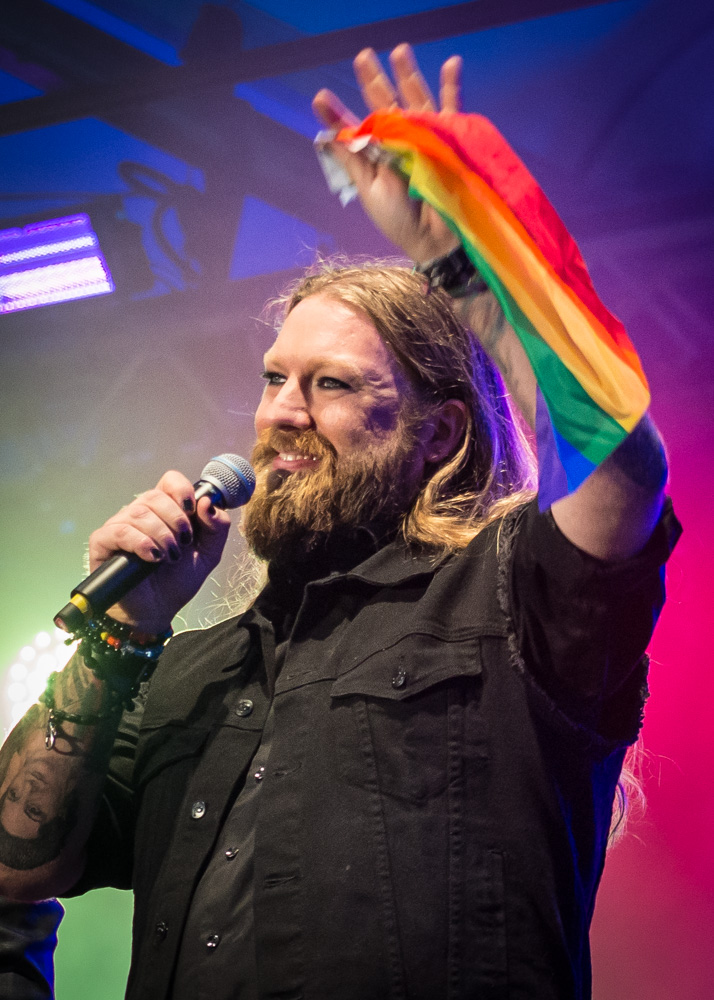
- Söderberg in 2016

Background information
- Born: John Rickard Söderberg; 10 April 1975 (age 51)
- Origin: Snötorp, Sweden
- Genres: Opera, Musical
- Occupations: Singer; tenor; debater
- Website: www.rickardsoderberg.nu

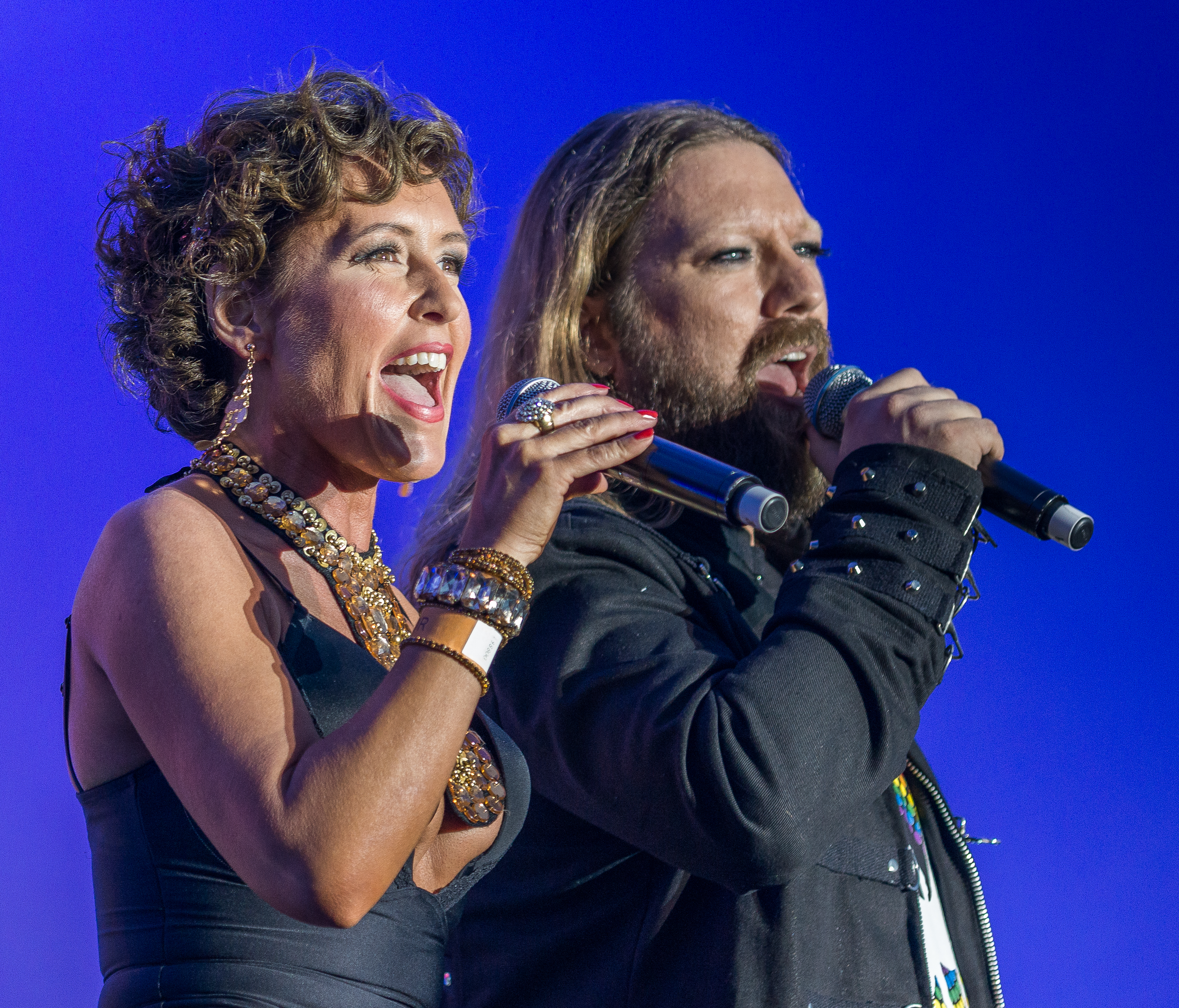
Rickard Söderberg and Anne Sofie von Otter at Stockholm Pride 2015

John Rickard Söderberg (born 10 April 1975) is a Swedish tenor, singer and debater.

== Early life and education ==
Söderberg was born in Snöstorp, Halland. He started as a pianist and had studied playing at the Music College of University of Gothenburg. He started his singing career after he began studying opera at Operacademy at the Royal Danish Theatre in Copenhagen, Denmark. Even before he had finished his studies he had made opera debuts on stages in Denmark, Sweden and Germany. After this he has continued his opera career at both smaller and bigger operahouses and today sings in Europe, US and Africa.

== Career ==
Söderberg is known for his interpretations of baroque music, Mozart and Wagner, in roles such as Idomeneo, Don Ottavio, Lurcanio, Oronte and Loge. Earlier he has also sung major roles such as Count Almaviva, Lensky, Rodolfo and Don José.

In 2005, he had the lead role in a modern interpretation of the opera Temistocle by Johann Christian Bach. During the summer of the same year Söderberg made his writing debut at the Drottningholm Palace Theatre as Oronte in the opera Alcina along with Anne Sofie von Otter and Christine Schäffer. In 2007 he had the lead role in L'Orfeo by Claudio Monteverdi and in 2012 the lead role in Orlando paladino by Joseph Haydn.

During 2011, he was part of Värmlandsoperan's interpretation of Wagner's Ring in the role as Loge. At Malmö Opera, Söderberg has played the role of Idomeneo along with Malena Ernman. He has also had roles in The Rake's Progress, Dialogues of the Carmelites, Madama Butterfly, The Tales of Hoffmann, The Magic Flute, Don Giovanni, Elijah and Let's make an Opera by Benjamin Britten. In 2013 he participated in the TV4 show Körslaget, being the leader of the choir from Halmstad. He finished third in the show.

Söderberg participated in Melodifestivalen 2015 in a duet with Elize Ryd, with the hope of representing Sweden in the Eurovision Song Contest 2015 in Vienna, Austria, but their song did not qualify. Söderberg participated in Let's Dance 2016 which was broadcast on TV4.

== LGBT activist ==
Söderberg is known for his work on LGBT issues. In the summer of 2013 Söderberg wrote an article where he demanded that the Swedish Embassy in Moscow would raise a rainbow flag during the Stockholm Pride festival. After some pressure on social media Söderberg was invited by the Swedish Ministry for Foreign Affairs to come to them to discuss the matter.

== Music ==
=== Singles ===
- "Although It's Been Said Many Times, Many Ways" (2010)

=== Albums ===
- The Perfect Man (2008)
- Castrato Arias – Uncut Edition (2009)
- Make the Yuletide Gay (2016)
