= Linus Svenning =

Swedish singer and songwriter (born 1990)

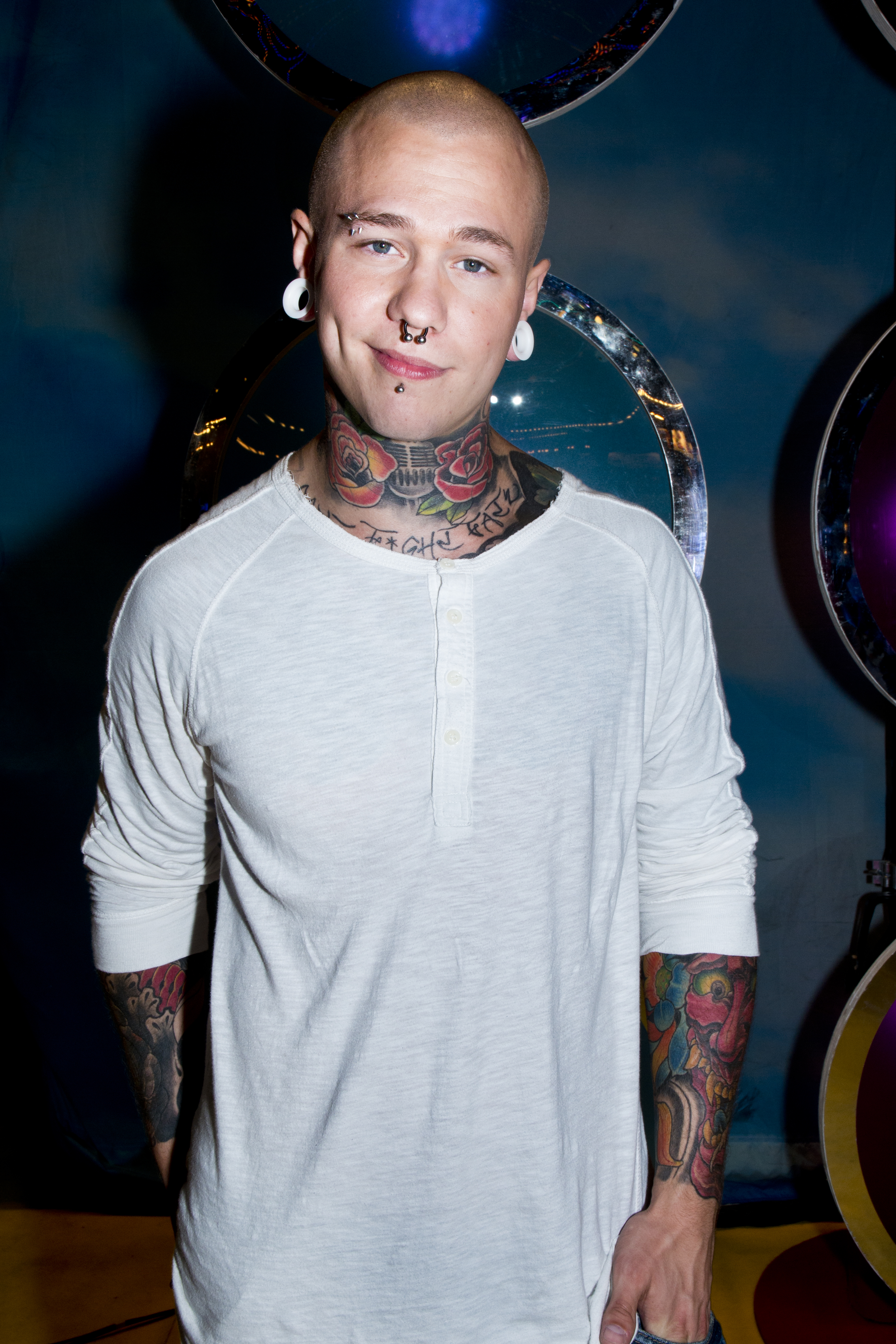
- Linus Svenning in 2014

Background information
- Born: 13 April 1990 (age 36); Bara, Scania Sweden
- Origin: Sweden
- Genres: Pop rock, pop, alternative rock
- Occupations: Singer, songwriter
- Years active: 2013–present
- Label: Stockhouse

Linus Martin Tommy Svenning (born 13 April 1990) is a Swedish singer and songwriter who participated in Melodifestivalen 2014, the selection process for picking the Swedish entry to the Eurovision Song Contest with the song "Bröder".

He sang in the first semi-final passing to the second chance round on 1 March in Lidköping and qualified after a duel round with Martin Stenmarck's song "När änglarna går hem". The duel qualified him for the Final 10 round held on 8 March 2014 where he finished fifth overall. Despite not winning the contest, the song "Bröder" became popular with the Swedish public reaching No. 3 on Sverigetopplistan, the official Swedish Singles Chart immediately after the contest.

== Singles ==
Title	Year	Peak chart positions	Certifications	Album
Title	Year	SWE	Certifications	Album
"Bröder"	2014	3	GLF: Platinum	Non-album singles
"Forever Starts Today"	2015	12	GLF: Platinum	Non-album singles
"—" denotes a single that did not chart or was not released in that territory.
