= I'll Be Fine (Molly Pettersson Hammar song) =

Single by Molly Pettersson Hammar
- Released: 7 February 2015
- Recorded: 2014
- Length: 3:10
- Label: Warner Music Sweden
- Songwriters: Molly Pettersson Hammar; Lisa Desmond; Tim Larsson; Tobias Lundgren; Gavin Jones

Molly Pettersson Hammar singles chronology
| "I'll Be Fine" (2015) | "Something Right" (2015) |

"I'll Be Fine" is a song by Swedish singer Molly Pettersson Hammar. It was released on 7 February 2015 as a digital download in Sweden. The song was written by Molly Pettersson Hammar, Lisa Desmond, Tim Larsson, Tobias Lundgren and Gavin Jones. The song took part in Melodifestivalen 2015, and was eliminated from the first semi-final on 7 February 2015, placing sixth. The song subsequently peaked at number 65 on the Swedish Singles Chart. The song also reached number one on the Swedish iTunes chart and peaked at number six on Digilistan (The Swedish download chart).

== Track listing ==
Digital download
| No. | Title | Length |
|---|---|---|
| 1. | "I'll Be Fine" | 3:12 |

== Charts ==
| Chart (2015) | Peak position |
|---|---|
| Sweden (Sverigetopplistan) | 65 |

== Release history ==
| Region | Date | Format | Label |
|---|---|---|---|
| Sweden | 7 February 2015 | Digital download | Warner Music Sweden |
