= Don't Stop Believing (Mariette song) =

Single by Mariette

from the album My Revolution
- Released: 28 February 2015
- Genre: Pop
- Length: 2:51:00
- Label: Solid Union
- Songwriters: Miss Li; Sonny Gustafsson

Mariette Hansson singles chronology
"If Only I Can" (2014)	"Don't Stop Believing" (2015)	"My Revolution" (2015)

"Don't Stop Believing" is a single by Swedish singer Mariette. The song was performed by her in Melodifestivalen 2015 and reached the third place.

== Track listing ==
- Digital download
1. "Don't Stop Believing" – 2:51

== Charts ==
Chart (2015)	Peak position
Sweden (Sverigetopplistan)	27

== Certifications ==
Region	Certification	Certified units/sales
Sweden (GLF)	Gold	20,000^{‡}
^{‡} Sales+streaming figures based on certification alone.
