= Mariette Hansson =

Swedish singer and songwriter

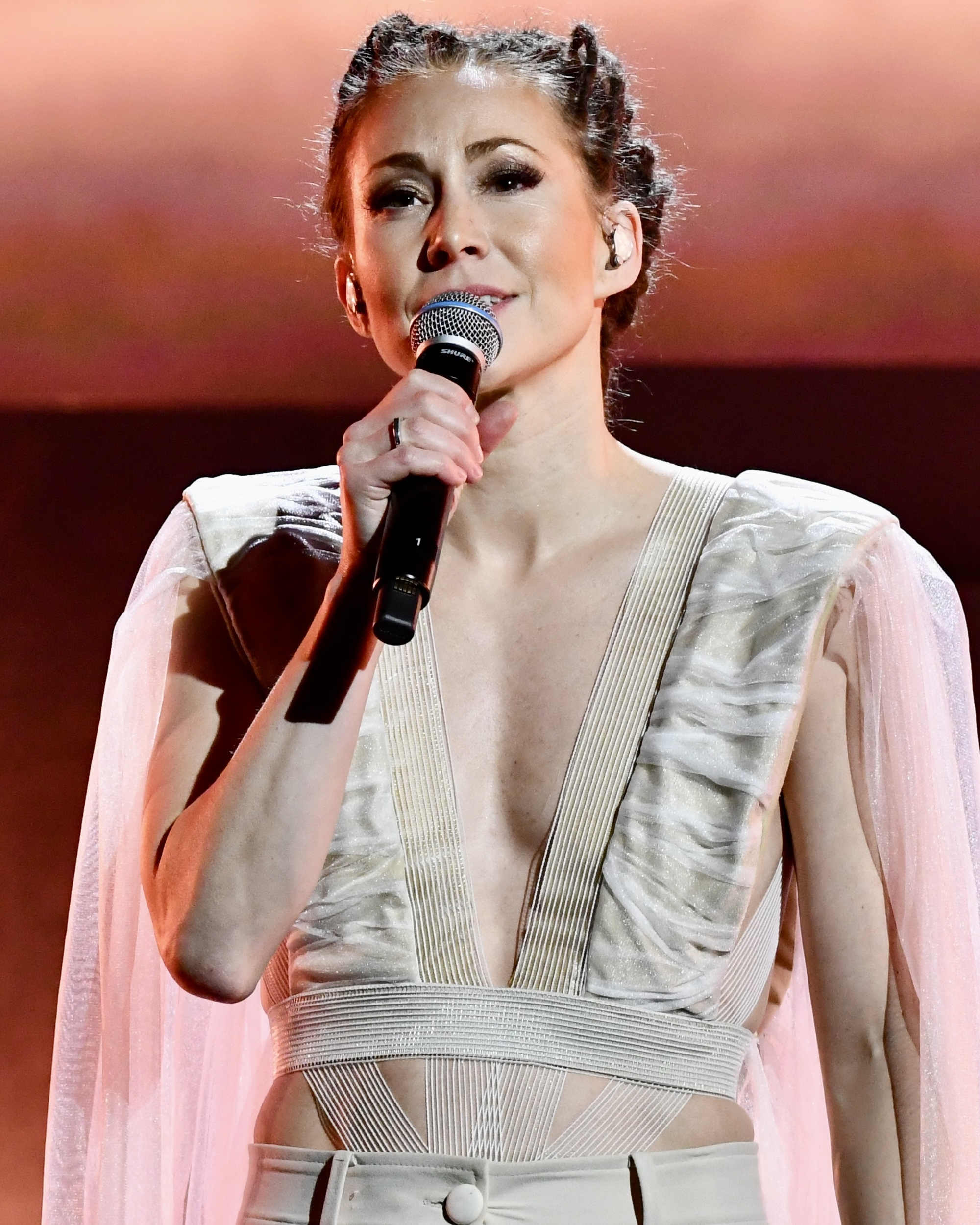
- Hansson at Melodifestivalen 2023

Background information
- Also known as: MaryJet; Mariette
- Born: Mariette Petra Carola Hansson; January 23, 1983 (age 43); Harplinge, Sweden
- Genres: Pop
- Occupations: Singer; songwriter
- Years active: 2009–present

Mariette Hansson (born 23 January 1983), sometimes credited as MaryJet, is a Swedish singer and songwriter. She participated in Sikta mot stjärnorna (Swedish pre-selection for European Soundmix Show) in 1999 imitating singer Amanda Marshall. She participated in Idol 2009 which was broadcast on TV4 and finished fourth. A year later, Hansson was announced as "homo of the year" at the QX Gaygala in Stockholm.

== Career ==
In 2013, Hansson played guitar in Magnus Ugglas band during his show "Magnus Den Store" at Hamburger Börs in Stockholm. In 2014 she toured along with Ace Wilder who placed second in Melodifestivalen 2014, the Swedish pre-selection for the Eurovision Song Contest.

She has taken part in Melodifestivalen, Sweden's pre-selection for the Eurovision Song Contest, five times and qualified to the final each time. She first participated in Melodifestivalen 2015 with the song "Don't Stop Believing". She took part in the second semi-final and qualified for the final in Friends Arena, eventually reaching the third place in the contest. Two years later she returned to the contest and took part in Melodifestivalen 2017 with the song "A Million Years". She qualified to the final on 11 March 2017 where she placed fourth. Next year she participated in Melodifestivalen a third time with the song "For You" which finished fifth in the Grand Final. She returned to the contest in 2020 with the song "Shout It Out" and qualified to the final, where she finished in tenth place, scoring 51 points. After that in 2023 she participated once again with the song "One Day" and qualified to the final through the Second Chance round, where she finished in eighth place.

== Discography ==
=== Studio albums ===
Title	Album details
In This Skin	Released: November 18, 2008; Label: Solid Union; Formats: CD, digital download

=== Extended plays ===
Title	EP details
My Revolution	Released: June 25, 2015; Label: Solid Union; Formats: CD, digital download

=== Singles ===
Title	Year	Peak chart positions	Certifications	Album
Title	Year	SWE	Certifications	Album
"Forever"	2011	—		Non-album single
"If Only I Can"	2014	—		My Revolution
"Don't Stop Believing"	2015	27	GLF: Gold	My Revolution
"My Revolution"	2015	—		My Revolution
"A Million Years"	2017	16	GLF: Platinum	Melodifestivalen 2017
"For You"	2018	13		Melodifestivalen 2018
"Shout It Out"	2020	30		Melodifestivalen 2020
"One Day"	2023	34		Melodifestivalen 2023
"—" denotes a single that did not chart or was not released in that territory.

Awards and achievements
Preceded by (Poland) Margaret	OGAE Second Chance Contest winner 2017	Succeeded by (Italy) Annalisa
