= Sanna Nielsen discography =

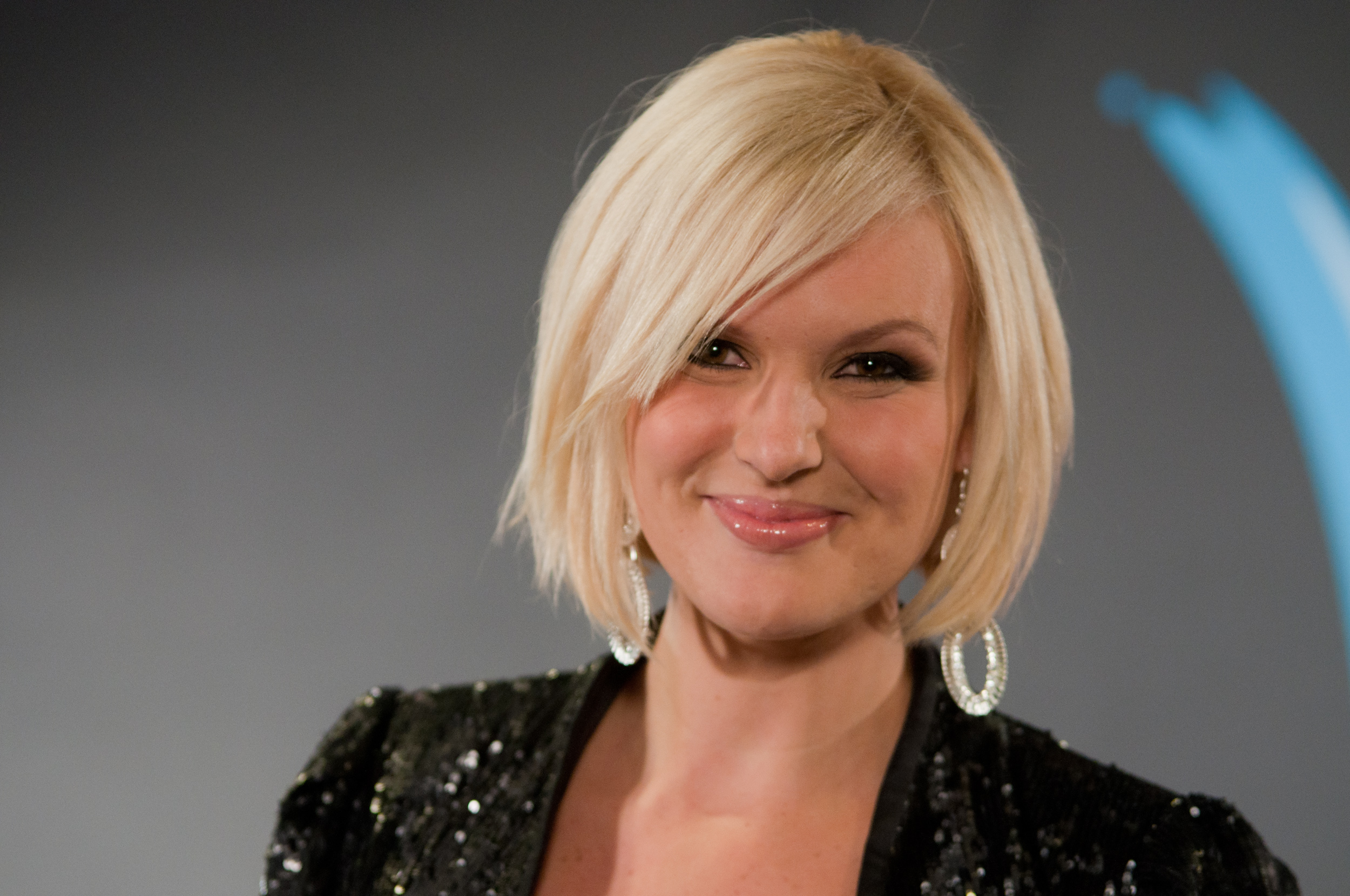
- Nielsen in 2010
- Studio albums: 8
- Compilation albums: 2
- Singles: 25
- Joint albums: 2

The discography of Swedish singer Sanna Nielsen consists of eight studio albums. She represented Sweden at the 2014 Eurovision Song Contest in Copenhagen, Denmark, with the song "Undo", coming third in the final with 218 points.

== Studio albums ==
Title	Details	Peak positions	Certifications
Title	Details	SWE	Certifications
Silvertoner	Released: 1996; Label: Maypole	55	
Min önskejul	Released: 1997; Label: Maypole, Mariann Grammofon	—	
Nära mej, nära dej	Released: 15 February 2006; Label: Lionheart	12	
Stronger	Released: 16 April 2008; Label: Lionheart	1	GLF: Gold
I'm in Love	Released: 2 March 2011; Label: Lionheart	3	
Vinternatten	Released: 21 November 2012; Label: Parlophone	5	
Min jul	Released: 4 November 2013; Label: Parlophone, Warner Music Group	—	GLF: Platinum
7	Released: 30 June 2014; Label: Parlophone, Warner Music Group	1	
"—" denotes an album that did not chart or was not released.

== Joint albums ==
Title	Details	Peak positions	Certifications
Title	Details	SWE	Certifications
Our Christmas (Sanna, Shirley, Sonja)	Released: November 2008	1	GLF: Platinum
Vår jul (Sanna, Shirley, Sonja)	Released: November 2010	6	GLF: Gold

== Compilation albums ==
Title	Details	Peak positions	Certifications
Title	Details	SWE	Certifications
Sanna 11–22	Released: 7 March 2007; Label: Lionheart	19	
16 bästa	Released: 9 April 2014; Label: Lionheart	—	

== Extended plays ==
Title	Details
Mitt Sanna jag	Released: 1 February 2019; Label: Lionheart

== Singles ==
Title	Year	Peak chart positions										Certifications	Album
Title	Year	SWE	AUS	BEL (Vl)	BEL (Wa)	DEN	GER	IRE	NL	SWI	UK	Certifications	Album
"Till en fågel"	1996	46	—	—	—	—	—	—	—	—	—		Silvertoner
"Där bor en sång"	1997	—	—	—	—	—	—	—	—	—	—		Min önskejul
"I Love the Summertime" ("Låt sommaren gunga dig")	1998	—	—	—	—	—	—	—	—	—	—		Non-album single
"Time to Say Goodbye (Con Te Partiró)"	1999	—	—	—	—	—	—	—	—	—	—		Sanna 11-22
"I går, i dag"	2001	32	—	—	—	—	—	—	—	—	—		Sanna 11-22
"Hela världen för mig"	2003	35	—	—	—	—	—	—	—	—	—		Sanna 11-22
"Du och jag mot världen" (with Fredrik Kempe)	2005	20	—	—	—	—	—	—	—	—	—		Sanna 11-22
"Rör Vid Min Själ"	2006	—	—	—	—	—	—	—	—	—	—		Nära mej, nära dej
"Vågar du, vågar jag"	2007	10	—	—	—	—	—	—	—	—	—		Sanna 11-22
"Empty Room"	2008	2	—	—	—	—	—	—	—	—	—		Stronger
"Nobody Without You"	2008	33	—	—	—	—	—	—	—	—	—		Stronger
"All I Want For Christmas" (Sanna Nielsen, Shirley Clamp & Sonja Aldén)	2008	39	—	—	—	—	—	—	—	—	—		Our Christmas
"My Grown Up Christmas List" (Sanna Nielsen, Shirley Clamp & Sonja Aldén)	2008	41	—	—	—	—	—	—	—	—	—		Our Christmas
"I Can Catch the Moon"	2009	—	—	—	—	—	—	—	—	—	—		Stronger
"Rätt kanal"	2009	—	—	—	—	—	—	—	—	—	—		Non-album single
"Devotion"	2010	15	—	—	—	—	—	—	—	—	—		I'm in Love
"Part of Me"	2010	—	—	—	—	—	—	—	—	—	—		I'm in Love
"I'm in Love"	2011	32	—	—	—	—	—	—	—	—	—		I'm in Love
"Can't Stop Love Tonight"	2011	—	—	—	—	—	—	—	—	—	—		I'm in Love
"Viskar ömt mitt namn"	2012	—	—	—	—	—	—	—	—	—	—		Vinternatten
"Undo"	2014	2	81	25	48	5	32	21	21	11	40	GLF: Gold	7
"En ton av tystnad" (Sanna Nielsen & Anders Glenmark)	2015	—	—	—	—	—	—	—	—	—	—		Non-album singles
"Dansar bort med någon annan"	2016	—	—	—	—	—	—	—	—	—	—		Non-album singles
"Inte ok"	2017	—	—	—	—	—	—	—	—	—	—		Non-album singles
"Innan du lämnar mig"	2017	—	—	—	—	—	—	—	—	—	—		Non-album singles
"Det vänder nu"	2018	—	—	—	—	—	—	—	—	—	—		Non-album singles
"Christmas Candle"	2018	—	—	—	—	—	—	—	—	—	—		Non-album singles
"Decembernatt"	2020	—	—	—	—	—	—	—	—	—	—		Non-album singles
"River"	2022	—	—	—	—	—	—	—	—	—	—		Non-album singles
"Waste Your Love"	2026	11	—	—	—	—	—	—	—	—	—		Non-album singles
"Heaven Is a Place on Earth"	2026	—	—	—	—	—	—	—	—	—	—		
"What Love Is"	2026	—	—	—	—	—	—	—	—	—	—		
"—" denotes a single that did not chart or was not released.
