= Sweden in the Eurovision Song Contest 2014 =

- Eurovision Song Contest 2014
- Participating broadcaster: Sveriges Television (SVT)
- Country: Sweden
- Selection process: Melodifestivalen 2014
- Selection date: 8 March 2014

Competing entry
- Song: "Undo"
- Artist: Sanna Nielsen
- Songwriters: Fredrik Kempe; David Kreuger; Hamed "K-One" Pirouzpanah

Placement
- Semi-final result: Qualified (2nd, 131 points)
- Final result: 3rd, 218 points

Participation chronology

Sweden was represented at the Eurovision Song Contest 2014 with the song "Undo", written by Fredrik Kempe, David Kreuger, and Hamed "K-One" Pirouzpanah, and performed by Sanna Nielsen. The Swedish participating broadcaster, Sveriges Television (SVT), organised the national final Melodifestivalen 2014 in order to select its entry for the contest. After a six-week-long competition consisting of four heats, a Second Chance round and a final, "Undo" performed by Sanna Nielsen emerged as the winner after achieving the highest score following the combination of votes from eleven international jury groups and a public vote.

Sweden was drawn to compete in the first semi-final of the Eurovision Song Contest which took place on 6 May 2014. Performing during the show in position 4, "Undo" was announced among the top 10 entries of the second semi-final and therefore qualified to compete in the final on 10 May. It was later revealed that Sweden placed second out of the 15 participating countries in the semi-final with 131 points. In the final, Sweden performed in position 13 and placed third out of the 26 participating countries with 218 points.

== Background ==
Prior to the 2014 contest, Sveriges Radio (SR) until 1979, and Sveriges Television (SVT) since 1980, had participated in the Eurovision Song Contest representing Sweden fifty-three times since SR's first entry in 1958. Sweden had won the contest on five occasions: in 1974 with the song "Waterloo" performed by ABBA, in 1984 with the song "Diggi-Loo Diggi-Ley" performed by Herreys, in 1991 with the song "Fångad av en stormvind" performed by Carola, in 1999 with the song "Take Me to Your Heaven" performed by Charlotte Nilsson, and in 2012 with the song "Euphoria" performed by Loreen. Following the introduction of semi-finals for the 2004, Sweden's entries, to this point, have featured in every final except for 2010 when the nation failed to qualify. In 2013, Sweden placed fourteenth in the contest with the song "You" performed by Robin Stjernberg.

As part of its duties as participating broadcaster, SVT organises the selection of its entry in the Eurovision Song Contest and broadcasts the event in the country. Since 1959, SR first and SVT later have organised the annual competition Melodifestivalen in order to select their entries for the contest.

== Before Eurovision ==
=== Melodifestivalen 2014 ===
Melodifestivalen 2014 was the Swedish music competition that selected Sweden's entry for the Eurovision Song Contest 2014. 32 competed in a six-week-long process which consisted of four heats on 1, 8, 15 and 22 February 2014, a second chance round on 1 March 2014, and a final on 8 March 2014. The six shows were hosted by Nour El-Refai and Anders Jansson. Eight songs competed in each heat—the top two qualified directly to the final, while the third and fourth placed songs qualified to the second chance round. The bottom four songs in each heat were eliminated from the competition. An additional two songs qualified to the final from the second chance round. The results in the heats and second chance round were determined exclusively by public televoting, while the overall winner of the competition was selected in the final through the combination of a public vote and the votes from eleven international jury groups. Among the competing artists were former Eurovision Song Contest contestants Helena Paparizou who represented Greece in 2001 as part of the duo Antique as well as in 2005 which she won, Martin Stenmarck who represented Sweden in 2005, Andreas Lundstedt (participating as a member of Alcazar) who represented Switzerland in 2006 and Sylvester Schlegel who represented Sweden in 2007 as part of the group The Ark.

==== Heats and Second Chance round ====
- The first heat took place on 1 February 2014 at the Malmö Arena in Malmö. "To the End" performed by Yohio and "Songbird" performed by Ellen Benediktson qualified directly to the final, while "Survivor" performed by Helena Paparizou and "Bröder" performed by Linus Svenning qualified to the Second Chance round. "Aleo" performed by Mahan Moin, "Casanova" performed by Elisa Lindström, "Bedroom" performed by Alvaro Estrella, and "Bygdens son" performed by Sylvester Schlegel were eliminated.
- The second heat took place on 8 February 2014 at the Cloetta Center in Linköping. "Undo" performed by Sanna Nielsen and "Efter solsken" performed by Panetoz qualified directly to the final, while "När änglarna går hem" performed by Martin Stenmarck and "Love Trigger" performed by J.E.M qualified to the Second Chance round. "Hallelujah" performed by The Refreshments, "Glow" performed by Manda, "I Am Somebody" performed by Pink Pistols, and "Set Yourself Free" performed by Little Great Things were eliminated.
- The third heat took place on 15 February 2014 at the Scandinavium in Gothenburg. "Yes We Can" performed by Oscar Zia and "Busy Doin' Nothin'" performed by Ace Wilder qualified directly to the final, while "All We Are" performed by State of Drama and "Echo" performed by Outtrigger qualified to the Second Chance round. "Red" performed by Eko, "Burning Alive" performed by Shirley Clamp, "En enkel sång" performed by CajsaStina Åkerström, and "Around the World" performed by Dr. Alban feat. Jessica Folcker were eliminated.
- The fourth heat took place on 22 February 2014 at the Fjällräven Center in Örnsköldsvik. "Blame It on the Disco" performed by Alcazar and "Natural" performed by Anton Ewald qualified directly to the final, while "En himmelsk sång" performed by Ellinore Holmer and "Raise Your Hands" performed by Ammotrack qualified to the Second Chance round. "Fight Me If You Dare" performed by I.D.A, "Hollow" performed by Janet Leon, "Hela natten" performed by Josef Johansson, and "Ta mig" performed by Linda Bengtzing were eliminated.
- The Second Chance round (Andra chansen) took place on 1 March 2014 at the Sparbanken Lidköping Arena in Lidköping. "Survivor" performed by Helena Paparizou and "Bröder" performed by Linus Svenning qualified to the final.

==== Final ====
The final was held on 8 March 2014 at the Friends Arena in Stockholm. Ten songs competed—two qualifiers from each of the four preceding heats and two qualifiers from the Second Chance round. The combination of points from a viewer vote and eleven international jury groups determined the winner. The viewers and the juries each had a total of 473 points to award. The nations that comprised the international jury were Denmark, Estonia, France, Germany, Israel, Italy, Malta, the Netherlands, Russia, Spain and The United Kingdom. "Undo" performed by Sanna Nielsen was selected as the winner with 212 points.

R/O	Artist	Song	Juries	Televote	Total	Place
1	Anton Ewald	"Natural"	4	14	18	10
2	Ellen Benediktson	"Songbird"	31	30	61	7
3	Alcazar	"Blame It on the Disco"	62	48	110	3
4	Oscar Zia	"Yes We Can"	32	21	53	8
5	Linus Svenning	"Bröder"	46	37	83	5
6	Helena Paparizou	"Survivor"	57	27	84	4
7	Yohio	"To the End"	39	43	82	6
8	Sanna Nielsen	"Undo"	90	122	212	1
9	Panetoz	"Efter solsken"	15	18	33	9
10	Ace Wilder	"Busy Doin' Nothin'"	97	113	210	2

== At Eurovision ==
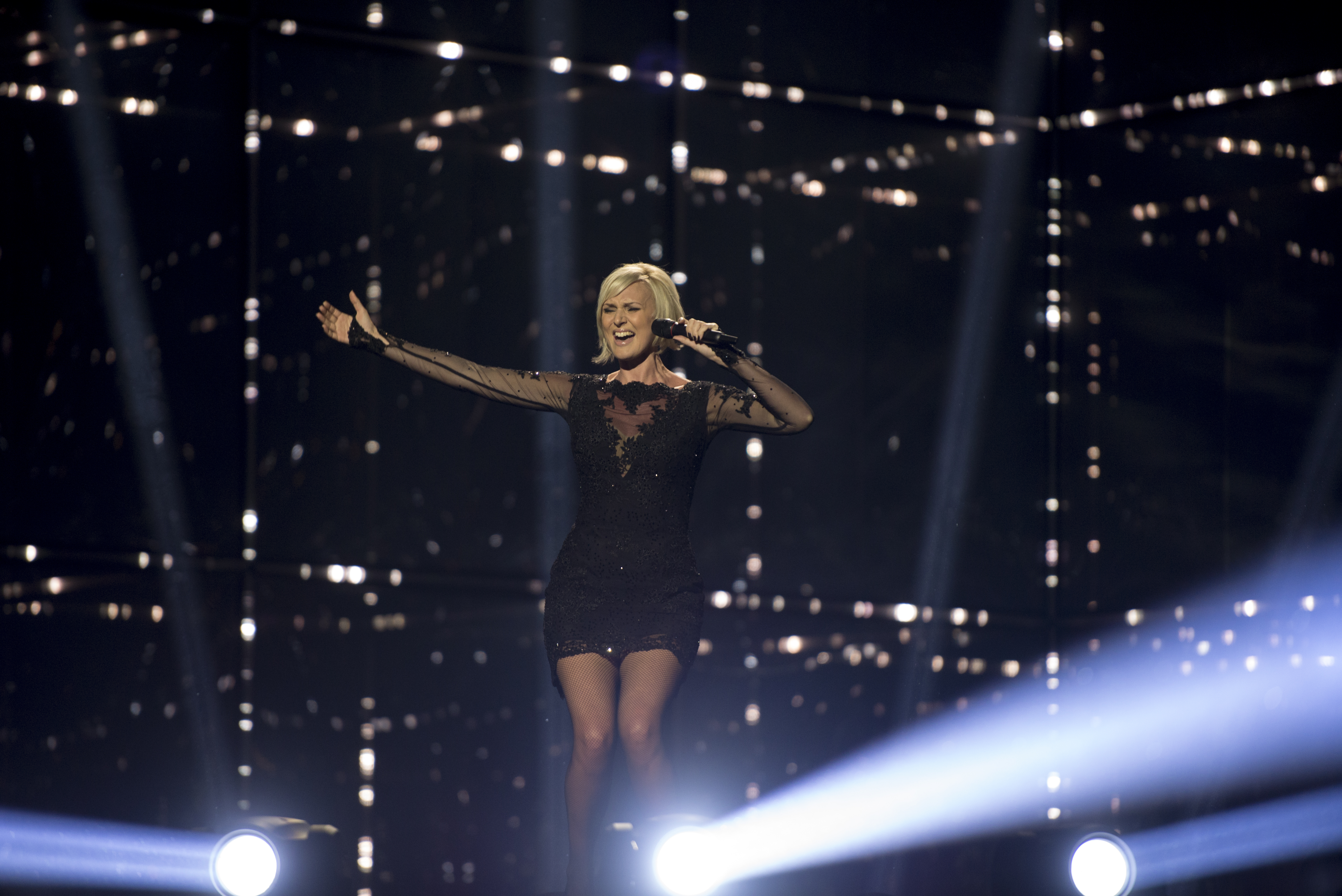
Sanna Nielsen at the first semi-final dress rehearsal

To ensure fair ticket distribution in the Nordic region for the semi-finals, the Eurovision Reference Group, at the request by the host broadcaster for the 2014 contest DR, held a draw at the European Broadcasting Union headquarters in Geneva in November 2013 where Sweden was drawn to compete in the first semi-final on 6 May 2014. During the semi-final allocation draw on 20 January 2014 at the Copenhagen City Hall, Sweden was drawn to compete in the first half of the first semi-final. In the first semi-final, the producers of the show decided that Sweden would perform 4th, following Estonia and preceding Iceland. Sweden qualified from first semi-final and competed in the final on 10 May 2014. During the winner's press conference for the first semi-final qualifiers, Sweden was allocated to compete in the first half of the final. In the final, the producers of the show decided that Sweden would perform 13th, following Germany and preceding France. Sweden placed 3rd in the final, scoring 218 points.

On stage, Sanna Nielsen was joined by five backing vocalists: Britta Bergström, Jeanette Ohlsson, Thérèse Löf Amberg, Dea Norberg and Jessica Marberger. The Swedish performance focused on Sanna alone on stage surrounded by lights which eventually shone on a large glitter ball on the ceiling.

In Sweden, both the semi-finals and the final were broadcast on SVT1 with commentary by Malin Olsson and Edward af Sillén. The shows were also broadcast via radio on Sveriges Radio P4 with commentary by Carolina Norén and Ronnie Ritterland. The Swedish spokespersons revealing the result of the Swedish vote in the final was Alcazar.

=== Voting ===
==== Points awarded to Sweden ====
Points awarded to Sweden (Semi-final 1)
Score	Country
12 points	Spain
10 points	Denmark; Hungary; Iceland; Moldova; Ukraine
8 points	Belgium; Latvia; Netherlands; Portugal
7 points	Estonia
6 points	Albania; France; Russia
5 points	Montenegro
4 points	Armenia
3 points	San Marino
2 points	
1 point	

Points awarded to Sweden (Final)
Score	Country
12 points	Denmark; Romania; Ukraine
10 points	Belgium; Estonia; Finland; Israel; San Marino; Spain
8 points	Hungary; Latvia; Netherlands; Norway; Portugal; Slovenia
7 points	Albania; Iceland; Lithuania; Malta; United Kingdom
6 points	Austria; Moldova; Switzerland
5 points	
4 points	France; Ireland; Poland
3 points	Montenegro
2 points	Georgia; Greece; Russia
1 point	

==== Points awarded by Sweden ====
Points awarded by Sweden (Semi-final 1)
Score	Country
12 points	Netherlands
10 points	Hungary
8 points	Armenia
7 points	Iceland
6 points	Ukraine
5 points	Estonia
4 points	Portugal
3 points	Montenegro
2 points	Russia
1 point	Latvia

Points awarded by Sweden (Final)
Score	Country
12 points	Austria
10 points	Netherlands
8 points	Denmark
7 points	Hungary
6 points	Finland
5 points	Armenia
4 points	Iceland
3 points	Norway
2 points	Poland
1 point	France

==== Detailed voting results ====
The following members comprised the Swedish jury:

- Michael Cederberg (jury chairperson) – playlist manager P3 radio, radio host
- Robert Sehlberg – music director at RIX FM radio
- Oscar Zia – singer
- Sacha Jean-Baptiste – dancer, choreographer, creative director
- Elli Flemström – artist, member of J.E.M

Detailed voting results from Sweden (Semi-final 1)
R/O	Country	M. Cederberg	R. Sehlberg	O. Zia	S. Jean-Baptiste	E. Flemström	Jury Rank	Televote Rank	Combined Rank	Points
01	Armenia	11	4	5	6	2	4	2	3	8
02	Latvia	12	15	10	13	15	15	7	10	1
03	Estonia	4	6	6	4	3	3	11	6	5
04	Sweden									
05	Iceland	6	7	4	3	12	6	4	4	7
06	Albania	13	11	15	11	4	13	10	13	
07	Russia	8	2	11	12	13	8	12	9	2
08	Azerbaijan	15	10	7	10	5	9	13	11	
09	Ukraine	5	5	3	7	11	5	5	5	6
10	Belgium	3	9	14	14	8	10	14	14	
11	Moldova	7	13	13	9	6	11	15	15	
12	San Marino	14	14	12	5	14	14	9	12	
13	Portugal	10	12	8	8	7	7	8	7	4
14	Netherlands	2	3	1	2	9	2	1	1	12
15	Montenegro	9	8	9	15	10	12	6	8	3
16	Hungary	1	1	2	1	1	1	3	2	10

Detailed voting results from Sweden (Final)
R/O	Country	M. Cederberg	R. Sehlberg	O. Zia	S. Jean-Baptiste	E. Flemström	Jury Rank	Televote Rank	Combined Rank	Points
01	Ukraine	11	16	11	18	17	13	11	12	
02	Belarus	16	19	21	21	18	22	22	23	
03	Azerbaijan	24	10	17	20	16	20	25	24	
04	Iceland	6	6	13	6	15	8	7	7	4
05	Norway	17	8	5	2	6	5	10	8	3
06	Romania	18	12	24	12	14	16	12	14	
07	Armenia	20	9	9	10	5	9	6	6	5
08	Montenegro	14	13	18	23	22	21	21	20	
09	Poland	4	25	22	22	7	17	3	9	2
10	Greece	9	23	16	14	11	12	13	13	
11	Austria	2	2	2	4	1	1	1	1	12
12	Germany	3	20	12	7	13	10	19	16	
13	Sweden									
14	France	7	5	8	17	8	7	14	10	1
15	Russia	13	7	19	15	24	14	16	17	
16	Italy	15	24	7	19	21	19	24	21	
17	Slovenia	10	18	23	25	19	23	23	25	
18	Finland	12	17	3	3	10	6	5	5	6
19	Spain	19	14	15	13	23	18	18	18	
20	Switzerland	21	21	20	24	25	25	15	19	
21	Hungary	1	3	1	5	3	2	8	4	7
22	Malta	25	11	14	16	12	15	9	11	
23	Denmark	8	4	10	8	2	4	4	3	8
24	Netherlands	5	1	4	1	4	3	2	2	10
25	San Marino	23	22	25	11	20	24	20	22	
26	United Kingdom	22	15	6	9	9	11	17	15	
