= 16 bästa =

Compilation album by Sanna Nielsen
- Released: 9 April 2014
- Recorded: 1996–2011
- Genre: Pop; Schlager
- Label: Lionheart

Sanna Nielsen chronology
Min Jul (2013)	16 bästa (2014)	7 (2014)

16 bästa (English: "16 Best") is a budget compilation released by Sanna Nielsen shortly after her 2014 Melodifestivalen win with "Undo", which went on to represent Sweden in the Eurovision Song Contest in 2014.

This compilation was a special release by previous record label 'Lionheart' in order to present her previous material to the new Sanna audience that was gained with “Undo”. It features all her greatest hits including “Empty Room” and “I’m in Love”. It doesn’t contain “Undo”.

As a budget release, it was ineligible to chart.

== Review ==
Swedish Music Tistory gave the album a positive review and said that anyone who likes the Melodifestivalen will like this album. They said the best songs on the album are "Stronger" and "I'm in Love" and this is a good album summarizing Nielsen's 18-year career to date.

== Track listing ==
The album was released in Sweden (physically) digitally.

1. "Empty Room"
2. "I'm in Love"
3. "Nobody Without You"
4. "I Can Catch the Moon"
5. "Devotion"
6. "Part of Me"
7. "Can't Stop Love Tonight"
8. "Demolition Woman"
9. "Till en fågel"
10. "I går, i dag"
11. "Vägen hem"
12. "Du och jag mot världen" (with Fredrik Kempe)
13. "Vågar du, vågar jag"
14. "Koppången"
15. "Rör vid min själ (You Raise Me Up)"
16. "Nära mej"

== Credits ==
- Artwork [Hair & Styling] – Peter Wennberg
- Artwork [Make Up] – Kia Wennberg
- Coordinator – Fredrik Järnberg
- Photography By – Caroline Roosmark

== Release history ==
Region	Date	Format	Label
Sweden	9 April 2014	CD, digital download	Lionheart Music Group – LHICD0162
