= I'm in Love =

I'm in Love may refer to:

== Albums ==
- I'm in Love (Evelyn King album) or the title song (see below), 1981
- I'm in Love (Melba Moore album) or the title song, 1988
- I'm in Love (Sanna Nielsen album) or the title song (see below), 2011
- I'm in Love (Wilson Pickett album) or the title song (see below), 1968

== Songs ==
- "I'm in Love" (Bobby Womack song), first recorded by Wilson Pickett, 1968; covered by Aretha Franklin, 1974
- "I'm in Love" (Evelyn "Champagne" King song), 1981
- "I'm in Love" (Ginuwine song), 2006
- "I'm in Love" (Ola song), 2012
- "I'm in Love" (Lennon–McCartney song), first recorded by the Fourmost, 1963
- "I'm in Love" (Sanna Nielsen song), 2011
- "I'm in Love (I Wanna Do It)", by Alex Gaudino, 2010
- "I'm in Luv", by Joe, 1993
- "I'm in Love", by Audio Bullys from Generation, 2005
- "I'm in Love", by Badfinger from Magic Christian Music, 1970
- "I'm in Love", by Men Without Hats from The Adventures of Women & Men Without Hate in the 21st Century, 1989
- "I'm in Love", by Mini Mansions from Guy Walks Into a Bar..., 2019
- "I'm in Love", by Offer Nissim featuring Maya, 2008
- "I'm in Love", by Ruby Turner from Women Hold Up Half the Sky, 1986
- "I'm in Love", by Secret from Secret Summer, 2014
- "I'm in Love", by Starparty; see Ferry Corsten discography#Singles, 1997

== Other uses ==
- "I'm in Love!" (RuPaul's Drag Race All Stars), a television episode

== See also ==
- In Love (disambiguation)
- Estoy Enamorado (disambiguation), the phrase in Spanish
