= Sanna 11–22 =

2007 Sanna Nielsen compilation album

Compilation album by Sanna Nielsen
- Released: 7 March 2007
- Recorded: 1996–2007
- Genre: Pop; schlager
- Label: Lionheart

Sanna Nielsen chronology
Nära mej, nära dej (2006)	Sanna 11–22 (2007)	Stronger (2008)

Sanna 11–22 was released on March 7, 2007 and is the first greatest hits compilation album from Swedish singer Sanna Nielsen. It peaked at number 19 on the Swedish Albums Chart. The album title refers to the age she started recording songs to her present age.

== Track listing ==
1. Vågar du, vågar jag
2. Surrender
3. Loneliness
4. Nära mig
5. Rör vid min själ (You Raise Me Up)
6. Koppången
7. Du och jag mot världen (vocal duet: Sanna Nielsen-Fredrik Kempe)
8. Hela världen för mig
9. Där bor en sång
10. I går, i dag
11. Time to Say Goodbye
12. Till en ängel
13. En gång när jag blir stor
14. Änglafin

== Reviews ==
AllMusic critic John Lucas said, "Listening to this collection, one does get the impression that Nielsen has yet to really find a defining hit of her own, enjoyable as many of the cuts are. Still, with 11 years of success behind her and still just 22-years-old, she has plenty of time to discover a song that's as good as her voice is. If that ever happens, volume two of this collection could be even better".

== Charts ==
Chart (2007)	Peak position
Swedish Albums (Sverigetopplistan)	19
