= Vinternatten =

Studio album by Sanna Nielsen
- Released: 19 November 2012
- Genre: Christmas; Pop; Schlager; Classical; Ballad
- Label: Parlophone

Sanna Nielsen chronology
I'm in Love (2011)	Vinternatten (2012)	Min jul (2013)

Singles from Vinternatten
- 1. "Viskar ömt mitt namn " Released: October 29, 2012

Vinternatten (English: "One Winters Night") is a Christmas album by Swedish singer Sanna Nielsen, released in Sweden on 19 November 2012. This is her second solo Christmas album, following her 1997 release, Min önskejul. The album features the lead single "Viskar ömt mitt namn", a ballad version of her Melodifestivalen 2011 song "I'm in Love" as well as a cover of Leona Lewis' worldwide hit "Bleeding Love".

== Track listing ==
The album was released digitally and physically on November 19, 2012, with 12 tracks.

Standard edition
No.	Title	Writer(s)	Length
1.	"Jul, jul, strålande jul"	Edvard Evers, Gustaf Nordqvist	3:20
2.	"Viskar ömt mitt namn"	Liselott Liljefjäll, Sanna Nielsen, Joakim Ramsell	3:22
3.	"Bleeding Love"	Jesse McCartney, Ryan Tedder	4:28
4.	"Angel"	Sarah McLachlan	4:38
5.	"O helga natt ("Cantique de Noël")"	Adolphe Adam	4:36
6.	"Drummer Boy"	Katherine Kennicott Davis, Henry Onorati, Harry Simeone	3:35
7.	"Koppången"	Py Bäckman, Pereric Moraeus	4:38
8.	"Utan dina andetag"	Joakim Berg	4:00
9.	"I'm in Love (ballad version) "	Peter Boström, Thomas G:Son, Bobby Ljunggren, Irini Michas	3:02
10.	"Stilla natt ("Stille Nacht, heilige Nacht")"	Franz Xaver Gruber, Egil Monn-Iversen, Joseph Mohr, Joakim Ramsell	3:26
11.	"Vinternatten (In the Bleak Midwinter)"	Gustav Holst, Sanna Nielsen, Christina Rossetti	3:08
12.	"Ave Maria"	traditional	4:57

== Promotion ==
On 16 December, Nielsen performed "Viskar ömt mitt namn" and "Drummer Boy" live on "Nyhetsmorgon".

== Review ==
Scandipop gave the album a positive review saying; "It’s a fab album and well worth checking out before the year ends". They also said "Sanna’s new Christmas album ‘Vinternatten’ has been the biggest selling seasonal effort in Sweden this year".

== Chart performance ==
"Vinternatten" debuted at #17 on the week commencing November 30, 2012 before peaking at #5 three weeks later. It spent 7 weeks on the chart.

=== Weekly charts ===
Chart (2012)	Peak position
Swedish Albums (Sverigetopplistan)	5

=== Year-end charts ===
Chart (2012)	Position
Swedish Albums (Sverigetopplistan)	47
