= 7 (Sanna Nielsen album) =

Studio album by Sanna Nielsen
- Released: 30 June 2014
- Genre: Pop
- Length: 30:55
- Label: Warner Music
- Producer: Nicki Adamsson, Lina Hansson, Joel Humlénm, Fredrik Kempe, David Kreuger, Hampus Lindvall, John Lundvik, Anders Lystell, Per Magnusson, Sanna Nielsen, Hamed "K-One" Pirouzpanah, Joakim Ramsell

Sanna Nielsen chronology
16 bästa (2014)	7 (2014)	Mitt Sanna jag (2019)

Singles from 7
- 1. "Undo" Released: February 23, 2014

7 is the eighth studio album by Swedish singer Sanna Nielsen, released in Sweden on 30 June 2014 by Warner Music. It was preceded by the lead single "Undo " on 23 February 2014. The album debuted at number one in Sweden.

The title refers to the number of attempts it took Nielsen to win Melodifestivalen and earn the right to represent Sweden in the Eurovision Song Contest, which had been an ambition of hers for many years.

== Promotion ==
From July 1–10, Nielsen promoted and signed copies of the album in Skansen, Svenljunga, Sölvesborg, Löddeköpinge, Gullbranna, Kosta, Gothenburg, Uddevalla, Luleå, Trollhättan, Gullbranna, Kringlan and Södertälje.

On July 14, Nielsen performed at "Victoriadagen" (Victoria Day), which is the celebration of Her Royal Highness Crown Princess Victoria’s birthday.

== Critical reception ==
Peter Dunwoody of 'ESC Xtra' gave the album 7/10, saying: "the album is 'mid-tempo' and 'middle-of-the-road' and while the production is more electronic than in her previous albums, many of the songs could have happily existed ten years ago." He continued saying "there are very few adventurous moments but the highlights are very satisfying pure pop. The big triumph of the album is the production: it’s crisp, it’s big, and it’s just so Swedish"

Daniel Tew of 'Eurovisionista' said: "Overall, 7 is a collection of songs which flows well and is consistent in its strength. The pop pedigree behind the album is impeccable and the songs contained in it have hit potential" but said "the main downfall of the 7 as an album is the fact that it only contains nine tracks."

Zachary Thomas of 'wiwibloggs' gave the album 9.5/10, saying: "Overall, this album is spectacular and cleverly showcases Sanna in a variety of styles. “Breathe” includes a dub-step backing, and a catchy build-up to the chorus; “All About Love” has a slight Latin flare; “Trouble” is a tad eclectic, and “Ready” is a feel good, up-tempo track that makes you want to sway and clap along".

== Track listing ==
Standard edition
No.	Title	Writer(s)	Producer(s)	Length
1.	"Skydivin"	Christian Fast, Curtis Richardson, John Lundvik, Maria Marcus	Maria Marcus, Lundvik	3:34
2.	"Breathe"	Ina Wroldsen, Per Magnusson, David Kreuger	Magnusson, Kreuger, Hamed "K-One" Pirouzpanah	3:30
3.	"Rainbow"	Wroldsen, Magnusson, Kreuger	Magnusson, Kreuger, Joel Humlénm^{[a]}, Anders Lystell^{[a]}	3:58
4.	"Undo"	Kreuger, Fredrik Kempe, Pirouzpanah	Kreuger, Kempe, Pirouzpanah	3:09
5.	"All About Love"	Camilla Läckberg, Pelle Nylén	Kreuger, Pirouzpanah	3:25
6.	"Trouble"	Hampus Lindvall, Lina Hansson, Nicki Adamsson, Victor Rådström	Lindvall, Hansson, Adamsson	3:34
7.	"Ready"	Magnusson, Kreuger, Kempe, Sharon Vaughn	Magnusson, Kreuger, Kempe, Pirouzpanah^{[a]}	3:51
8.	"You First Loved Me"	Magnusson, Kreuger, Kempe, Vaughn, Kimberley Walsh	Magnusson, Kreuger, Kempe	3:35
9.	"Undo" (acoustic edit)	Kreuger, Kempe, Pirouzpanah	Joakim Ramsell, Sanna Nielsen	3:18
Total length:				30:55

Notes

- ^{^[a]} signifies an additional producer

== Charts ==
Chart (2014)	Peak position
Swedish Albums (Sverigetopplistan)	1

== Release history ==
Region	Date	Format	Label
Sweden	30 June 2014	CD, digital download	Warner Music Group
