= Ellen Benediktson =

Swedish singer and songwriter

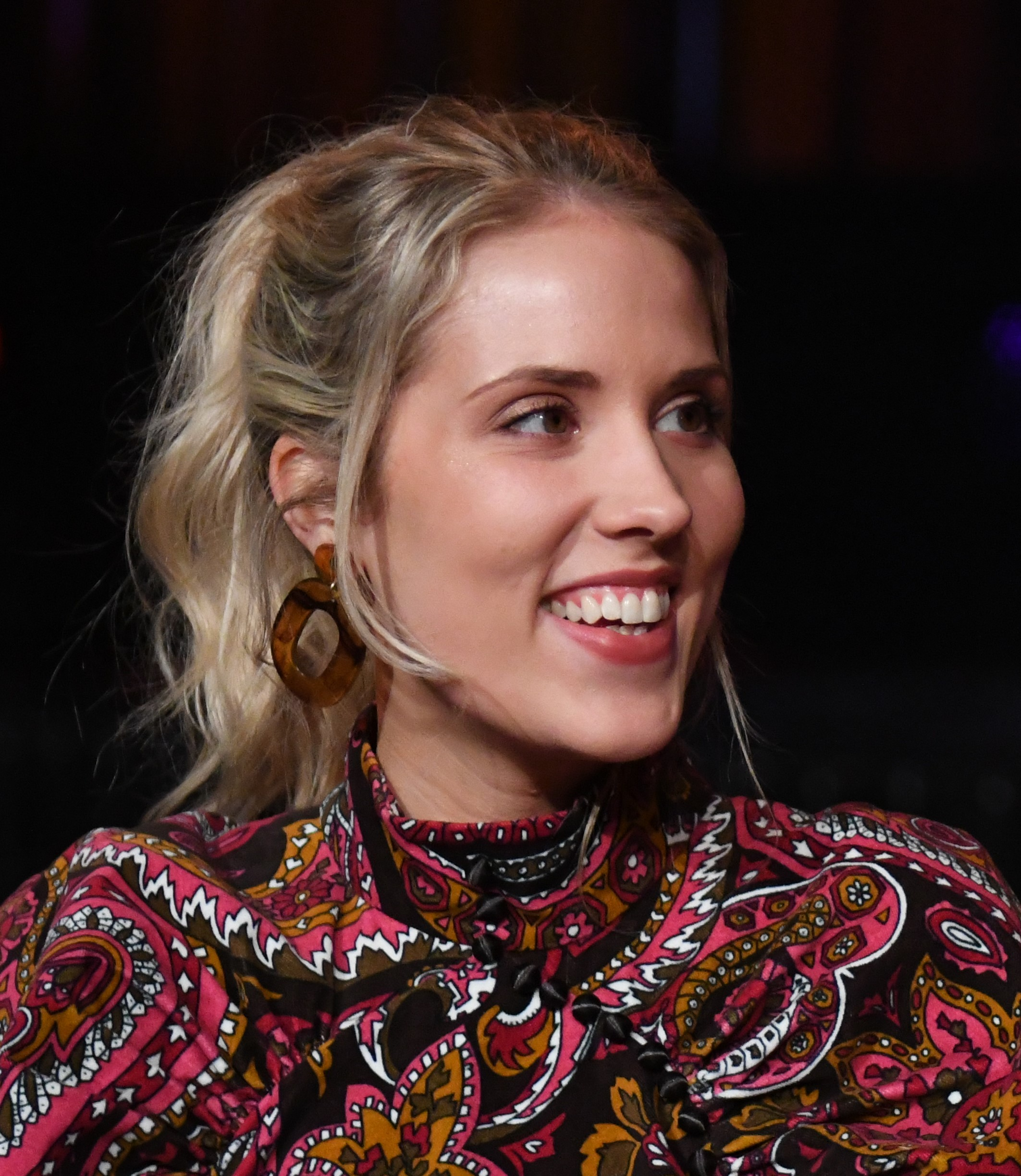
- Ellen Benediktson, 2020

Background information
- Born: 25 April 1995 (age 30); Limhamn, Malmö, Sweden
- Genres: Electronic; electronica; electropop
- Occupations: Singer, songwriter
- Instruments: Vocals, keyboard
- Years active: 2013–present
- Labels: Warner Music Sweden

Ellen Benediktson (born 25 April 1995 in Limhamn) is a Swedish singer and songwriter best known for taking part in Melodifestivalen 2014, 2015 and 2020.

== Life and career ==
In 2013 Benediktson first garnered attention when she was the stand-in singer during the rehearsals for the Eurovision Song Contest 2013 singing France's entry "L'enfer et moi". The next year, she took part in Melodifestivalen 2014 with the song "Songbird". Benediktson placed second in the semi-final, thus making it to the final, where she placed seventh. In April 2014, Benediktson released the song "When the Sun Comes Up" as a part of a compilation album associated with the Swedish feminist political party Feminist Initiative, she is also a supporter of the left-wing party. She competed in Melodifestivalen 2015 with the song "Insomnia". She came 5th in Semi-final 3 and was therefore knocked out of the competition. She competed in Melodifestivalen 2020 alongside Simon Peyron with the song, "Surface". They made it to the Second Chance round.

== Discography ==
=== Singles ===
Title	Year	Peak chart positions	Certifications	Album
Title	Year	SWE	Certifications	Album
"Songbird"	2014	35		Non-album single
"When the Sun Comes Up"	2014	—		F!
"Insomnia"	2015	88		Non-album single
"Surface" (with Simon Peyron)	2020	87		Non-album single
Laura Nox
"Save a Little Love"	2016	—		Non-album single
"Body Shots"	2017			Non-album single
"—" denotes a single that did not chart or was not released in that territory.
