= Busy Doin' Nothin' (Ace Wilder song) =

Single by Ace Wilder

from the album Busy Doin' Nothin'
- Released: 23 February 2014
- Recorded: 2014
- Genre: Pop, electropop, EDM
- Length: 2:53
- Label: Warner
- Songwriter(s): Ace Wilder, Joy Deb, Linnea Deb

Ace Wilder singles chronology
"Bitches Like Fridays" (2013)	"Busy Doin' Nothin'" (2014)	"Riot" (2014)

"Busy Doin' Nothin'" is a song by Swedish singer Ace Wilder. The track was written and composed by Ace Wilder, Joy Deb, Linnéa Deb. It premiered on 15 February 2014, as part of the third semi-final in Melodifestivalen 2014. The song successfully progressed to the final. The single was officially released on 23 February 2014, part of the EP with the same title.

Wilder performed "Busy Doin' Nothin'" on 8 March in Friends Arena in Stockholm for the final of Melodifestivalen. The song won the jury vote and came second in the televote, ultimately losing the contest by two points to Sanna Nielsen and her song "Undo".

Despite this, the song became popular in Sweden outpeaking "Undo" reaching the top in Swedish Charts selling 120,000 copies to date. "Undo" peaked at number 2 and has sold over 40,000 copies.

== Charts and certifications ==
=== Weekly charts ===
Chart (2014)	Peak position
Sweden (Sverigetopplistan)	1
Sweden (Digilistan)	1
Finland Download (Latauslista)	27

=== Year-end charts ===
Chart (2014)	Position
Sweden (Sverigetopplistan)	14

=== Certifications ===
Region	Certification	Certified units/sales
Sweden (GLF)	3× Platinum	120,000^{‡}
^{‡} Sales+streaming figures based on certification alone.
