= Estoy Enamorado =

Estoy Enamorado (Spanish for "I'm in love") may refer to:

- "Estoy Enamorado" (Donato & Estéfano song), 1995; covered by Thalía, 2009
- "Estoy Enamorado" (Wisin & Yandel song), 2010

== See also ==
- I'm in Love (disambiguation)
