= Vår jul =

Studio album by Sanna Nielsen, Shirley Clamp & Sonja Aldén
- Released: 3 November 2010
- Genre: Christmas; pop; Schlager; classical; ballad
- Length: 41:39
- Label: Lionheart, Universal Music

Sanna Nielsen, Shirley Clamp & Sonja Aldén chronology
Our Christmas (2008)	Vår jul (2010)

Vår jul (English: "Our Christmas") is the second joint album by Swedish artists Sanna Nielsen, Shirley Clamp & Sonja Aldén released in Sweden in 2010, physically through Lionheart International and digitally through Universal Music.

Although the album didn't match the success of its predecessor, Our Christmas, the album was still a commercial success peaking at number six on the Swedish Albums Chart and was certified gold in the country.

== Background ==
Following the success of their 2008 collaborative album, Our Christmas, Shirley Clamp, Sanna Nielsen, and Sonya Aldén recorded and released a second Christmas album. The major difference with this one, is that the majority of the songs are performed in Swedish. They also co-wrote a number of the songs on the album.

== Reviews ==
Scandipop gave the album a positive review; "We’ve come over all warm, festive, and cozy after listening to clips of all of the tracks from the new Sanna, Shirley & Sonja Christmas album, ‘Vår Jul’. There's not a single clip that we don't like the sound of – they're all absolutely beautiful.".

StubbyChristmas compared the sound to Wilson Phillips "...but only when they're singing harmony vocals. Often, though, they just trade leads".

== Track listing ==
The album was released digitally and physically on November 3, 2010 with 12 tracks.

- All tracks are performed by Sanna Nielsen, Shirley Clamp & Sonja Aldén.

Standard edition
No.	Title	Writer(s)	Length
1.	"Vår jul"	Sonja Aldén, Bobby Ljunggren, Marcos Ubeda	3:44
2.	"Gläns över sjö och strand"	Alice Tegnér	3:26
3.	"Pie Jesu"	Andrew Lloyd Webber	3:37
4.	"Åter igen blir det kallt"	Shirley Clamp, Robin Svensson	3:53
5.	"Himmel på jord"	Amund Enger	3:24
6.	"Tänd ett ljus"	Lasse Lindbom, Niklas Strömstedt	3:49
7.	"Jul, jul, strålande jul"	Gustaf Nordqvist, Edvard Evers	2:52
8.	"Maria"	Sonja Aldén, Kristian Lagerström, Maciel Numhauser	2:41
9.	"Bereden väg för Herran"	Frans Mikael Franzén	2:06
10.	"Himlen i min famn"	Carola Häggkvist	4:47
11.	"Dagen är kommen"	John Francis Wade	4:26
12.	"Så mörk är natten i midvintertid"	Jonny Johansson, Lennart Lunden	2:54

== Charts ==
=== Weekly charts ===
Chart (2010)	Peak position
Swedish Albums (Sverigetopplistan)	6

=== Year-end charts ===
Chart	Year	Position
Swedish Albums (Sverigetopplistan)	2010	30

== Certifications ==
Region	Certification	Certified units/sales
Sweden (GLF)	Gold	20,000^{‡}
^{‡} Sales+streaming figures based on certification alone.
