= Melodifestivalen 2014 =

Swedish music competition

Dates and venues
- Heat 1: 1 February 2014
- Heat 2: 8 February 2014
- Heat 3: 15 February 2014
- Heat 4: 22 February 2014
- Second chance: 1 March 2014
- Final: 8 March 2014; Friends Arena, Solna

Production
- Broadcaster: Sveriges Television (SVT)
- Director: Daniel Jelinek; Robin Hofwander
- Presenters: Nour El-Refai; Anders Jansson

Participants
- Number of entries: 32: 8 in each heat; 10 in the final (2 from each heat, 2 from the Second Chance round)

Vote
- Winning song: "Undo" by Sanna Nielsen

Melodifestivalen 2014 was the Swedish music competition which selected Sweden's 54th entry for the Eurovision Song Contest 2014. Sanna Nielsen won the competition with the song "Undo". This was one of the closest results in Melodifestivalen history, as Nielsen beat her nearest rival, Ace Wilder, by only two points.

For the thirteenth consecutive year, the competition consisted of four heats, a "Second Chance" round, and a final. A total of 32 entries were divided into four heats, with eight compositions in each. From each semifinal, the songs that won first and second place went directly to the final, while the songs that placed third and fourth proceeded to the Second Chance heat. The bottom four songs in each semifinal were eliminated from the competition. As in 2013, half of the competing entries were chosen by a selection panel from the received submissions, while the other half was selected through an invitation process by SVT. A new rule for the 2014 competition stipulated that at least 20% of the selected entries were to be written by female composers/lyricists in a full or partial capacity.

== Format ==
Melodifestivalen 2014 was the thirteenth consecutive year in which the competition took place in different cities across Sweden. The four semifinals were held in Malmö (1 February), Linköping (8 February), Gothenburg (15 February) and Örnsköldsvik (22 February). The Second Chance round was held in Lidköping on 1 March, while the final in Solna was held on 8 March. Starting order is set.

=== Schedule ===
Date	City	Venue	Tickets	Heat
1 February	Malmö	Malmö Arena	15,500	Heat 1
8 February	Linköping	Cloetta Center	11,500	Heat 2
15 February	Gothenburg	Scandinavium	14,000	Heat 3
22 February	Örnsköldsvik	Fjällräven Center	10,000	Heat 4
1 March	Lidköping	Sparbanken Lidköping Arena	12,500	Second chance (Andra chansen)
8 March	Solna	Friends Arena	27,000	Final

== Heats ==
=== Heat 1 ===
R/O	Artist	Song (English translation)	Songwriter(s)	Votes			Place	Result
R/O	Artist	Song (English translation)	Songwriter(s)	Round 1	Round 2	Total	Place	Result
1	Yohio	"To the End"	Andreas Johnson, Johan Lyander, Peter Kvint, Yohio	55,826	61,393	117,219	1	Final
2	Mahan Moin	"Aleo"	Mahan Moin, Anderz Wrethov	6,943	—	6,943	7	Out
3	Linus Svenning	"Bröder" (Brothers)	Fredrik Kempe	29,464	31,268	60,732	4	Second Chance
4	Elisa Lindström	"Casanova"	Ingela "Pling" Forsman, Bobby Ljunggren, Jimmy Jansson	18,143	19,171	37,314	5	Out
5	Alvaro Estrella	"Bedroom"	Jakke Erixson, Jon Bordon, Loren Francis, Kristofer Östergren	14,386	—	14,386	6	Out
6	Ellen Benediktson	"Songbird"	Sharon Vaughn, Johan Fransson, Tim Larsson, Tobias Lundgren	43,619	55,825	99,444	2	Final
7	Sylvester Schlegel	"Bygdens son" (The district's son)	Sylvester Schlegel	5,934	—	5,934	8	Out
8	Helena Paparizou	"Survivor"	Bobby Ljunggren, Henrik Wikström, Karl-Ola Kjellholm, Sharon Vaughn	32,141	38,297	70,438	3	Second Chance

=== Heat 2 ===
R/O	Artist	Song (English translation)	Songwriter(s)	Votes			Place	Result
R/O	Artist	Song (English translation)	Songwriter(s)	Round 1	Round 2	Total	Place	Result
1	J.E.M	"Love Trigger"	Thomas G:son, Peter Boström, Julimar "J-Son" Santos	18,790	26,872	45,662	4	Second Chance
2	The Refreshments	"Hallelujah"	Joakim Arnell	18,417	19,234	37,651	5	Out
3	Manda	"Glow"	Joy Deb, Linnea Deb, Melanie Wehbe, Charlie Mason	10,964	—	10,964	8	Out
4	Panetoz	"Efter solsken" (After sunshine)	Johan Hirvi, Mats Lie Skåre, Nebeyu Baheru, Njol Badjie, Pa Modou Badjie	25,986	31,415	57,401	2	Final
5	Pink Pistols	"I Am Somebody"	Joakim Törnqvist, Nestor Geli, Per Ivar Hed, Susie Päivärinta, Tord Bäckström	11,435	—	11,435	7	Out
6	Sanna Nielsen	"Undo"	Fredrik Kempe, David Kreuger, Hamed "K-One" Pirouzpanah	52,542	57,050	109,592	1	Final
7	Little Great Things	"Set Yourself Free"	Charlie Grönvall, Cristoffer Wernqvist, Felix Grönvall, Adam Dahlström	15,183	—	15,183	6	Out
8	Martin Stenmarck	"När änglarna går hem" (When the angels go home)	Andreas Öhrn, Alexander Bard, Martin Stenmarck, Peter Boström	20,981	30,916	51,897	3	Second Chance

=== Heat 3 ===
R/O	Artist	Song (English translation)	Songwriter(s)	Votes			Place	Result
R/O	Artist	Song (English translation)	Songwriter(s)	Round 1	Round 2	Total	Place	Result
1	Outtrigger	"Echo"	Joy Deb, Linnea Deb, Anton Malmberg Hård af Segerstad, Outtrigger	18,713	19,873	38,586	4	Second Chance
2	Eko	"Red"	Joy Deb, Linnea Deb, Anna Lidman, Hannes Lundberg, Michael Ottosson	9,053	—	9,053	8	Out
3	Oscar Zia	"Yes We Can"	Fredrik Kempe, David Kreuger, Hamed "K-One" Pirouzpanah	29,790	30,945	60,735	1	Final
4	Shirley Clamp	"Burning Alive"	Bobby Ljunggren, Marcos Ubeda, Sharon Vaughn, Henrik Wikström	12,617	—	12,617	6	Out
5	State of Drama	"All We Are"	Göran Werner, Sanken Sandqvist, Emil Gullhamn, Sebastian Hallifax	24,262	18,581	42,843	3	Second Chance
6	CajsaStina Åkerström	"En enkel sång" (A simple song)	CajsaStina Åkerström	10,789	—	10,789	7	Out
7	Ace Wilder	"Busy Doin' Nothin'"	Ace Wilder, Joy Deb, Linnea Deb	19,105	24,599	43,704	2	Final
8	Dr. Alban & Jessica Folcker	"Around the World"	Dr. Alban, Jakke Erixson, Karl-Ola Kjellholm	18,041	19,689	37,730	5	Out

=== Heat 4 ===
R/O	Artist	Song (English translation)	Songwriter(s)	Votes			Place	Result
R/O	Artist	Song (English translation)	Songwriter(s)	Round 1	Round 2	Total	Place	Result
1	Alcazar	"Blame It on the Disco"	Fredrik Kempe, David Kreuger, Hamed "K-One" Pirouzpanah	42,061	55,392	97,453	1	Final
2	I.D.A	"Fight Me If You Dare"	Albin Nicklasson, Nicklas Laine, Louise Frick Sveen	10,578	—	10,578	6	Out
3	Janet Leon	"Hollow"	Karl-Ola Kjellholm, Jimmy Jansson, Louise Winter	8,307	—	8,307	8	Out
4	Ammotrack	"Raise Your Hands"	Jari Kujansuu, Thomas Johansson, Calle Kindbom, Mikael de Bruin	20,425	21,202	41,627	4	Second Chance
5	Josef Johansson	"Hela natten" (All night)	Peter Boström, Thomas G:son, Josef Johansson, Peo Thyrén	9,953	—	9,953	7	Out
6	Linda Bengtzing	"Ta mig" (Take me)	Nicke Borg, Jojo Borg Larsson	15,239	15,861	31,100	5	Out
7	Ellinore Holmer	"En himmelsk sång" (A heavenly song)	Ellinore Holmer, Vanna Rosenberg, Åsa Schmalenbach, Josefina Sanner, Henrik Wikström, Amir Aly	21,411	24,465	45,876	3	Second Chance
8	Anton Ewald	"Natural"	John Lundvik	39,105	32,570	71,675	2	Final

== Second Chance ==
The Andra Chansen (Second Chance) round was held on 1 March in Sparbanken Lidköping Arena, Lidköping.

=== First Round ===
R/O	Artist	Song	Votes			Place	Result
R/O	Artist	Song	Round 1	Round 2	Total	Place	Result
1	Ammotrack	"Raise Your Hands"	16,998	—	16,998	8	Out
2	Linus Svenning	"Bröder"	45,657	49,295	94,952	1	Second Round
3	J.E.M	"Love Trigger"	28,626	—	28,626	6	Out
4	State of Drama	"All We Are"	29,352	22,150	51,502	5	Out
5	Ellinore Holmer	"En himmelsk sång"	17,685	—	17,685	7	Out
6	Martin Stenmarck	"När änglarna går hem"	30,681	26,366	57,047	4	Second Round
7	Helena Paparizou	"Survivor"	47,161	44,411	91,572	2	Second Round
8	Outtrigger	"Echo"	33,876	27,083	60,959	3	Second Round

=== Second Round ===
Duel	R/O	Artist	Song	Votes	Result
I	1	Outtrigger	"Echo"	51,627	Out
I	2	Helena Paparizou	"Survivor"	123,859	Final
II	1	Linus Svenning	"Bröder"	77,706	Final
II	2	Martin Stenmarck	"När änglarna går hem"	71,844	Out

== Final ==
The final of Melodifestivalen 2014 took place on 8 March 2014 at the Friends Arena in Solna. The 10 songs that qualified for the finals had either accomplished being the top two in their respective semifinal, or qualified from the Second Chance round.

R/O	Artist	Song	Juries	Televote/SMS/App			Total	Place
R/O	Artist	Song	Juries	Votes	Percentage	Points	Total	Place
1	Anton Ewald	"Natural"	4	35,208	3.0%	14	18	10
2	Ellen Benediktson	"Songbird"	31	75,748	6.4%	30	61	7
3	Alcazar	"Blame It on the Disco"	62	120,654	10.1%	48	110	3
4	Oscar Zia	"Yes We Can"	32	52,844	4.3%	21	53	8
5	Linus Svenning	"Bröder"	46	93,974	7.9%	37	83	5
6	Helena Paparizou	"Survivor"	57	67,366	5.6%	27	84	4
7	Yohio	"To the End"	39	109,363	9.3%	43	82	6
8	Sanna Nielsen	"Undo"	90	307,788	25.8%	122	212	1
9	Panetoz	"Efter solsken"	15	45,614	3.8%	18	33	9
10	Ace Wilder	"Busy Doin' Nothin'"	97	283,831	23.8%	113	210	2

Detailed International Jury Votes
R/O	Song	Denmark	Estonia	France	Germany	Israel	Italy	Malta	Netherlands	Russia	Spain	United Kingdom	Total
R/O	Song	Denmark	Estonia	France	Germany	Israel	Italy	Malta	Netherlands	Russia	Spain	United Kingdom	Total
1	"Natural"					1		2			1		4
2	"Songbird"		4	1	4		6		10	2	2	2	31
3	"Blame It on the Disco"			12	8	8	10	6	6			12	62
4	"Yes We Can"	1			1		4	8		4	6	8	32
5	"Bröder"	2	12	6	12	2			1	10		1	46
6	"Survivor"	8	2	4	6	6	2	12	2	1	10	4	57
7	"To the End"	10	8	2		4	1	4		6	4		39
8	"Undo"	6	6	10	10	10	8	10	4	8	12	6	90
9	"Efter solsken"	4	1		2				8				15
10	"Busy Doin' Nothin'"	12	10	8		12	12	1	12	12	8	10	97

== Ratings ==
Show	Date	Viewers	Votes
Semifinal 1	1 February 2014	3,405,000	415,421
Semifinal 2	8 February 2014	3,070,000	342,567
Semifinal 3	15 February 2014	3,050,000	258,030
Semifinal 4	22 February 2014	3,165,000	318,155
Second Chance	1 March 2014	2,740,000	746,752
Final	8 March 2014	3,302,000	1,192,390
