= Edenryd =

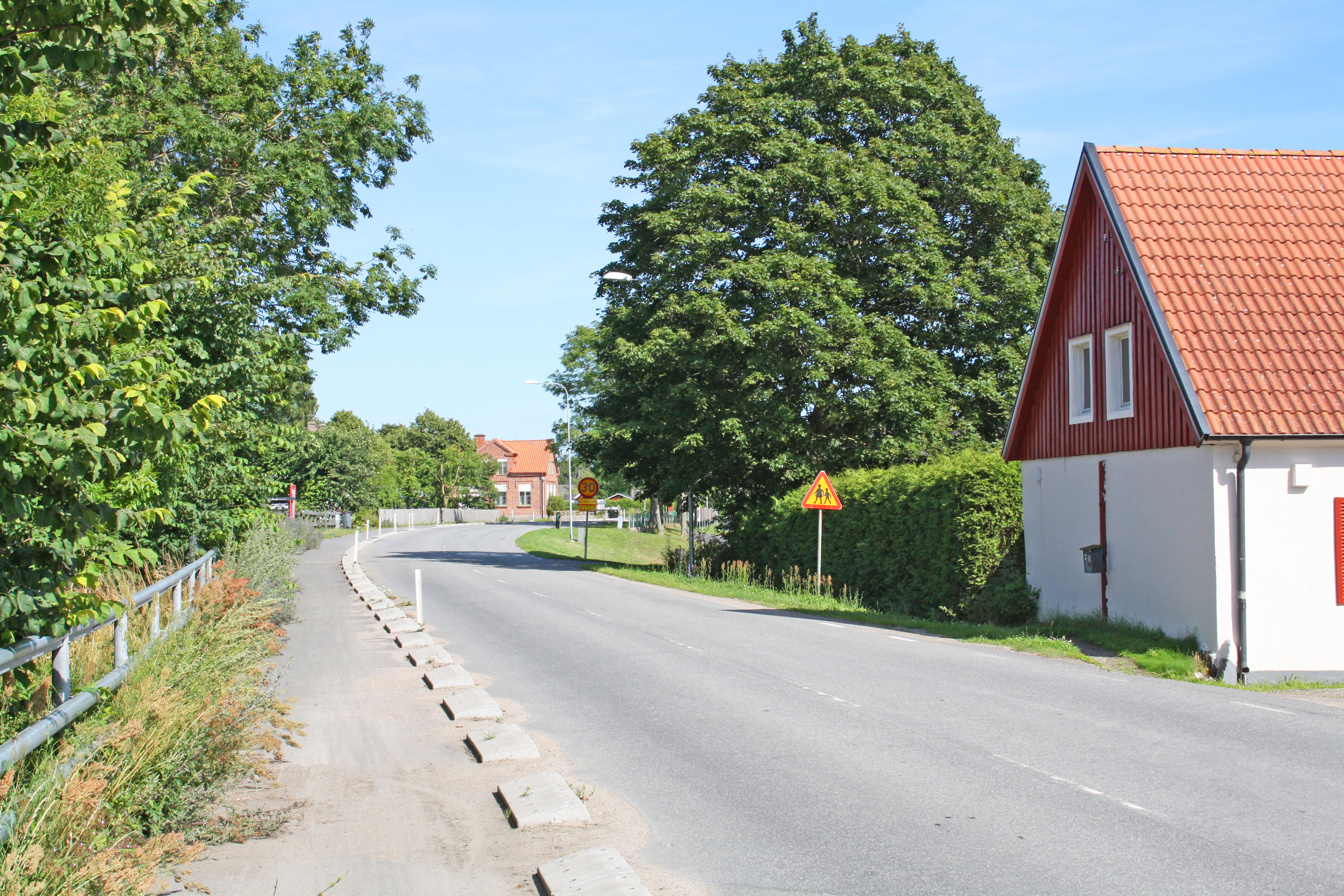
- The old country road between Blekinge and Scania in Edenryd in August 2015

- Location within Sweden
- Coordinates: 56°02′39″N 14°31′03″E
- Country: Sweden
- Province: Skåne
- County: Skåne County
- Municipality: Bromölla Municipality
- Time zone: UTC+1 (CET)
  - Summer (DST): CEST

Edenryd is a village in Bromölla Municipality in Skåne, Sweden.

Swedish singer Sanna Nielsen was born and raised in Edenryd.
