= Stronger (Sanna Nielsen album) =

Studio album by Sanna Nielsen
- Released: 16 April 2008
- Genre: Pop; Schlager
- Length: 51.27
- Label: Lionheart International, Universal Music Group

Sanna Nielsen chronology
Sanna 11–22 (2007)	Stronger (2008)	I’m in Love (2011)

Singles from Stronger
- 1. "Empty Room" Released: March 13, 2008; 2. "Nobody Without You" Released: July 3, 2008; 3. "I Can Catch The Moon" Released: 2009

Stronger is an album by Swedish singer Sanna Nielsen, released on April 16, 2008, and her first in English. It featured her single “Empty Room” which came 2nd at the Melodifestivalen 2008. The album debuted at number one on the Swedish Albums Chart.

== Track listing ==
The album was released in April 2008 with 14 tracks, and bonus video clip of her single “Empty Room”. It includes a cover of Olivia Newton-John's "Magic"

Standard edition
No.	Title	Writer(s)	Length
1.	"Strong"	Bobby Ljunggren, Marcos Ubeda	3:41
2.	"Empty Room"	Aleena Gibson, Bobby Ljunggren	3:03
3.	"Nobody Without You"	Henrik Wikström, Kristian Lagerström, Torbjörn Fall	3:04
4.	"I Believe It's You"	Aleena Gibson, Bobby Ljunggren, Oscar Holter	3:49
5.	"Heart Of Me"	Randy Goodrum, Bobby Ljunggren, Niklas Edberger	4:06
6.	"Tomorrow Ends Today"	Bobby Ljunggren, Marcos Ubeda	4:01
7.	"Impatiently Waiting For You"	Lotta Häggström, Bobby Ljunggren	3:50
8.	"Those Were The Days And The Nights Of Loving You"	Aleena Gibson, Peter Kvint	4:22
9.	"Out Of Reach"	Aleena Gibson, Emanuel Olsson	4:25
10.	"But I Know What I Want"	Charlie Mason, Johan Sjöberg, Kristian Lagerström	3:34
11.	"Broken In Two"	Bobby Ljunggren, Niklas Edberger, Randy Goodrum	4:07
12.	"Magic"	John Farrar	4:01
13.	"I Can Catch The Moon"	Bobby Ljunggren, Jörgen Ingeström, Aleena Gibson	3:00
14.	"This Is My Thanks"	Sanna Nielsen	9:44
15.	"Empty Room (Video) (bonus track) "	Aleena Gibson, Bobby Ljunggren	3:03

- Note: Track 14 ends at 2:58 followed by silence until 6:45 and a hidden track “Paradise“ which is ended abruptly at 9:26 by Sanna saying, among other things (in Swedish): "Can't we take this for the next album instead?" – almost 3 years later it was included in its entirety on her album “I'm In Love”.

== Review ==
AllMusic critic John Lucas reviewed the album positively, saying this is “Nielsen's first album in English, it is also clearly aimed at a younger market” and "There's no reason why several songs on this album couldn't take flight well beyond the confines of the Swedish pop scene given the right push. A veteran at just 23 years of age, Nielsen has finally emerged as a star with significant potential."

== Charts ==
=== Weekly charts ===
Chart (2008)	Peak position
Swedish Albums (Sverigetopplistan)	1

=== Year-end charts ===
Chart (2008)	Position
Swedish Albums (Sverigetopplistan)	33

== Certifications ==
Region	Certification	Certified units/sales
Sweden (GLF)	Gold	20,000^{^}
^{^} Shipments figures based on certification alone.
