= Hela världen för mig =

2003 Swedish single by Sanna Nielsen

Single by Sanna Nielsen
- A-side: "Hela världen för mig"
- B-side: "All That It Takes"
- Released: 2003
- Genre: schlager
- Label: M&L Records
- Songwriter: Thomas G:son
- Producers: Thomas G:son, Marcos Ubeda

Sanna Nielsen singles chronology
"I går, i dag" (2001)	"Hela världen för mig" (2003)	""Du och jag mot världen" (with Fredrik Kempe)" (2005)

Hela världen för mig is a 2003 single by Sanna Nielsen and written by Thomas G:son.

== Release ==
"Hela världen för mig" peaked at #35 in the Swedish singles chart and continued to appear for 35 weeks. It was the fourth most successful song of 2003 in the Svensktoppen charts. Nielsen shared that the song described her feelings as a student. It was entered into Melodifestivalen 2003 and reached the semifinals in Gothenburg on 22 February 2003 before being sent directly to the Stockholm Globe Arena for the finals. The song ranked fifth in the competition.

== Single track listing ==
1. Hela världen för mig – 3:01
2. All That It Takes – 3:02

== Charts ==
Chart (2003)	Peak position
Sweden (Sverigetopplistan)	35
