= Gullbranna =

- Location within Halland Location within Sweden
- Coordinates: 56°36′N 12°57′E
- Country: Sweden
- Province: Halland
- County: Halland County
- Municipality: Halmstad Municipality

Area
  - Total: 0.62 km^{2} (0.24 sq mi)

Population (31 December 2020)
  - Total: 667
  - Density: 1,100/km^{2} (2,800/sq mi)
- Time zone: UTC+1 (CET)
  - Summer (DST): UTC+2 (CEST)

Gullbranna is a locality situated in Halmstad Municipality, Halland County, Sweden, with 667 inhabitants in 2020.
