= Silvertoner =

Studio album by Sanna Nielsen
- Released: September 1996
- Genre: Schlager
- Label: Maypole

Sanna Nielsen chronology
| Silvertoner (1996) | Min önskejul (1997) |

Silvertoner is the debut studio album by Swedish singer Sanna Nielsen, released in September 1996. Nielsen was 11 at the time, turning 12 on November 27, 1996. The album contains her debut single "Till en fågel", which peaked at number 46 on the Swedish Singles Chart in 1996. The album peaked at number 55 on the Swedish Albums Chart.

== Track listing ==
1. När jag hör honom spela för vinden
2. Mamma häng me' mej ut i kväll
3. Maria Maria
4. Thimmy
5. Till en fågel
6. Bilder i mitt album
7. Teddybjörnen Fredriksson (duet with Lasse Berghagen)
8. En varsam hand
9. Änglafin
10. Leka med vinden
11. Mötet
12. Har jag chansen på dej
13. Kära dagbok
14. Viva, Fernando Garcia
15. En gång när jag blir stor

== Charts ==
| Chart (1996) | Peak position |
|---|---|
| Sweden | 55 |
