= Our Christmas (Sanna Nielsen, Shirley Clamp & Sonja Aldén album) =

Studio album by Sanna Nielsen, Shirley Clamp & Sonja Aldén
- Released: 19 November 2008
- Genres: Christmas, Pop, Schlager, Classical, Ballad,
- Length: 48:59
- Label: Lionheart

Sanna Nielsen, Shirley Clamp & Sonja Aldén chronology
Our Christmas (2008)	Vår jul (2010)

Singles from Our Christmas
- 1. "All I Want For Christmas Is You" Released: December 2008; 2. "My Grown Up Christmas List" Released: December 2008

Our Christmas is the first of two joint albums released in 2008 by Swedish artists Sanna Nielsen, Shirley Clamp & Sonja Aldén released through Lionheart International. The album was a commercial success peaking at number one on the Swedish Albums Chart and was certified platinum in 10 days in the country.

== Background ==
After performing together on the '2008 Sommer Sommer Sommer' tour, it was announced in October 2008 that the regular Melodifestivalen entrants (Shirley Clamp, Sanna Nielsen, and Sonya Aldén) would team up for a festive album, simply titled 'Our Christmas'. The album featured just one original recording; the opening track titled 'Another Winter Night' which is described as "a gloriously overblown 'All by Myself'-esque power ballad that laments the bleakness of a Christmas alone".

== Track listing ==
The album was released digitally and physically on November 19, 2008 with 12 tracks.

Standard edition
No.	Title	Writer(s)	Length
1.	"Another Winter Night (by Sanna Nielsen, Shirley Clamp & Sonja Aldén)"	Niklas Edberge, Kristian Lagerström, Henrik Wikström	3:20
2.	"All I Want For Christmas Is You (by Sanna Nielsen)"	Walter Afanasieff, Mariah Carey	4:09
3.	"Oh Holy Night (by Shirley Clamp)"	traditional	4:47
4.	"Ave Maria (by Sonja Aldén)"	traditional	5:02
5.	"My Grown Up Christmas List (by Sanna Nielsen, Shirley Clamp & Sonja Aldén)"	David Foster, Linda Thompson	4:45
6.	"The Christmas Song (by Sanna Nielsen, Shirley Clamp & Sonja Aldén)"	Mel Tormé, Robert Wells	4:16
7.	"Have Yourself a Merry Little Christmas (by Sanna Nielsen)"	Ralph Blane, Hugh Martin	3:56
8.	"This Christmas (by Shirley Clamp)"	Donny Hathaway, Nadine McKinnor	3:31
9.	"Driving Home for Christmas (by Sonja Aldén)"	Chris Rea	4:05
10.	"Light A Candle (by Sanna Nielsen, Shirley Clamp & Sonja Aldén)"	Wayne Haun, Joel Lindsey	3:39
11.	"Silent Night (by Sanna Nielsen, Shirley Clamp & Sonja Aldén)"	Franz Xaver Gruber, Egil Monn-Iversen, Joseph Mohr, Joakim Ramsell	3:55
12.	"The First Noel (by Sanna Nielsen, Shirley Clamp & Sonja Aldén)"	traditional	3:24

== Reviews ==
Jon O'Brien from 'All Music' said; "This 12-track collaborative effort eschews their trademark anthemic schlager-pop sound in favour of a more refined and sophisticated approach that blends stripped-back acoustic production with the trio's unusually understated vocals. Alongside the classic standards and respectful performances of traditional carols "Silent Night," "O Holy Night," and "The First Noel," there are also a few lesser-known seasonal pieces thrown into the mix, including the inspirational "Light a Candle" and Donny Hathaway's underrated R&B effort "This Christmas." This surprisingly restrained effort will make fans of schlager-pop divas feel like all their Christmases have come at once."

== Chart performance ==
"Our Christmas" debuted at #2, before rising to #1 on December 4, 2008, where it remained for 3 weeks and was certified platinum.

=== Weekly charts ===
Chart (2008)	Peak position
Swedish Albums (Sverigetopplistan)	1

=== Year-end charts ===
Chart (2008)	Position
Swedish Albums Sverigetopplistan	6

== Certifications ==
Region	Certification	Certified units/sales
Sweden (GLF)	Platinum	40,000^{^}
^{^} Shipments figures based on certification alone.
