= Songbird (Ellen Benediktson song) =

Single by Ellen Benediktson
- Released: 2014
- Genre: Pop
- Length: 3:06
- Label: Warner Music Sweden
- Songwriter(s): Sharon Vaughn, Johan Fransson, Tim Larsson, Tobias Lundgren

Ellen Benediktson singles chronology
"Songbird" (2014)	"When the Sun Comes Up" (2014)

"Songbird" is a song sung by Swedish singer-songwriter Ellen Benediktson and written by Sharon Vaughn, Johan Fransson, Tim Larsson and Tobias Lundgren. The song is best known for being performed by Benediktson at Melodifestivalen 2014. It qualified for the final from the first semifinal held in Malmö placing second out of eight. In the final, the song placed seventh out of ten.

On 6 April 2014, the song entered Svensktoppen.

== Charts ==
Chart (2014)	Peak position
Sweden (Sverigetopplistan)	35
