= Nära mej, nära dej =

Studio album by Sanna Nielsen
- Released: 15 February 2006
- Genre: Pop; Schlager
- Label: Lionheart

Sanna Nielsen chronology
Min önskejul (1997)	Nära mej, nära dej (2006)	Sanna 11–22 (2007)

Nära mej, nära dej is the third studio album by Swedish singer Sanna Nielsen, released on February 15, 2006. It peaked at number 12 on the Swedish Albums Chart. The opening track "Rör vid min själ" is "You Raise Me Up" with lyrics in Swedish.

== Track listing ==
1. Rör vid min själ (You Raise Me Up)
2. Nära mej
3. Vägen hem
4. Mitt drömda land
5. Koppången
6. En okänd värld
7. Där mitt hjärta för evigt bor
8. Jag är
9. I natt
10. Om du var min
11. Allt som du är
12. Härifrån till evigheten
13. I morgonens ljus

== Charts ==
Chart (2006)	Peak position
Swedish Albums (Sverigetopplistan)	12
