= Min jul (Sanna Nielsen album) =

Studio album by Sanna Nielsen
- Released: 4 November 2013
- Genre: Christmas
- Length: 44 minutes
- Label: Warner Music

Sanna Nielsen chronology
Vinternatten (2012)	Min jul (2013)	16 bästa (2014)

Min jul is a Sanna Nielsen Christmas album, released on 4 November 2013. This is Nielsen's third solo Christmas album, fifth including the joint albums with Shirley Clamp and Sonja Aldén.

== Track listing ==
The album was released in Sweden (physically) and digitally.

Standard edition
No.	Title	Writer(s)	Length
1.	"Auld Lang Syne"	Robert Burns	2:59
2.	"Drummer Boy"	Harry Simeone, Henry Onorati & Katherine Kennicott Davis	3:30
3.	"Jul, jul, strålande jul"	Edvard Evers & Gustav Nordqvist	3:20
4.	"Julen närmar sig"	Joakim Ramsell & Sanna Nielsen	3:20
5.	"Jingle Bells"	James Pierpont	1:56
6.	"O helga natt (Cantique de Noël)"	Adolphe Adam & Augustinus Kock	4:37
7.	"Song for a Winter's Night"	Gordon Lightfoot	3:46
8.	"Viskar ömt mitt namn"	Joakim Ramsell, Lotta Liljefjäll, Sanna Nielsen	3:23
9.	"Angel"	Sarah McLachlan	4:39
10.	"Vinternatten (In the Bleak Midwinter)"	Christina Rossetti, Gustav Holst, Sanna Nielsen	3:09
11.	"Ave Maria"	Franz Schubert & Sir Walter Scott	4:58
12.	"Happy Xmas (War Is Over)"	Yoko Ono & John Lennon	4:00
Total length:			30.55

- Tracks 2, 3, 6, 8 to 11 taken from the previous album Vinternatten.
