= Josef Johansson =

Swedish pop singer and songwriter (born 1993)

- Born: 10 June 1994 (age 32); Tunisia
- Origin: Gothenburg, Sweden
- Genres: Pop
- Occupations: singer; songwriter
- Label: EMI Records

Josef Johansson (born 10 June 1993) is a Tunisian-Swedish pop singer and songwriter.

== Biography ==
Born in Tunisia where he began singing as a young singer at age 6, he was raised in Gothenburg, Sweden. He later moved to Stockholm and appeared in a number of recordings as a demo artist for American producers.

He was signed to Warner Music in 2012, releasing his debut single "Baby Baby" that was released in the spring of 2013. The single played on various Swedish radio stations. In 2013 he was awarded the Ted Gärdestad scholarship for his songwriting.

In 2014, Johansson took part in Melodifestivalen 2014 in a bid to represent Sweden in Eurovision Song Contest 2014. He sang "Hela Natten" in the fourth round of the semi-finals during Melodifestivalen, but did not qualify to the finals. Despite that, his song charted on the Swedish Singles Chart, peaking at number 58.

== Discography ==
Year	Single	Peak chart positions	Album
Year	Single	SWE	Album
2014	"Hela Natten"	58	
2015	"Julkort från vårby gård" _{(featuring Nina Mira)}	82	
