= J.E.M =

Swedish pop group

J.E.M is a Swedish rap–pop group consisting of members Mergime Murati, Jeremie Yumba and Elli Flemström all three members originally auditioned as solo singers for the first season of X Factor in 2012. While none of them made it to the final stage of the auditions, all three were told to return to the auditions and formed the group J.E.M. On 30 November, J.E.M was the last act to be eliminated before the final. The group's rendition of "Wild Ones", and "Starships" made on to iTunes.

J.E.M took part in the second heat of Melodifestivalen 2014 at the Cloetta Center in Linköping with the song "Love Trigger", performing first and qualifying to Second Chance.

In summer 2015, Yumba decided to quit the band to pursue a solo career.

== Discography ==
=== Singles ===
Year	Single	Peak positions	Certification	Album
Year	Single	SWE	Certification	Album
2013	"Zoom"	—		N/A
2014	"Love Trigger"	25		N/A
