= Aleena Gibson =

Swedish songwriter

Aleena Gibson Aleena Högdahl
- Born: 31 May 1968 (age 56); Gothenburg, Sweden
- Genres: Country; folk; pop; rock

Aleena Gibson (born Anna-Lena Högdahl) is a Swedish songwriter living in Stockholm. Her credits include Jason Derulo, Mr. Big, Nick Carter, S Club 7, Chenoa, Tata Young, Rouge Jill Johnson, Girls' Generation, and Austin Mahone. She performed in Melodifestivalen 2003 singing her song "Better Believe It" and finished 6th in the first semi-final.

Stefan Andersson and Gibson finished 5th in the first semi-final of Melodifestivalen 2007. In late 2007 it was revealed that Aleena had written a song that would be performed in Melodifestivalen 2008. Aleena Gibson now sings with Swedish progressive rock band Kaipa.

== Entries in national Eurovision pre-selections ==
- "Anropar försvunnen" by Hanna Hedlund (Sweden 2000), 8th place
- "Nothing Can Stop Me" by Lina Hedlund (Sweden 2003), 4th place (Second Chance)
- "We're Unbreakable" by Sahlene (Sweden 2003), 5th place (semi-final)
- "Better Believe It" by Aleena (Sweden 2003), 6th place (semi-final)
- "Anything But You" by Andersson & Gibson (Sweden 2007), 5th place (semi-final)
- "Empty Room" by Sanna Nielsen (Sweden 2008), 2nd place
- "Why Am I Crying?" by Molly Sandén (Sweden 2012), 5th place
- "Can't Hurt Me Now" by Jessica Andersson (Sweden 2015), 11th place
- "Forever Starts Today" by Linus Svenning (Sweden 2015), 6th place
- "Dark Water" by Olga Lounová (Czech Republic 2020), 6th place
- "Lessons of Love" by Vanessa Amorosi (Australia 2020), 3rd place

== Discography ==
Album

- (2005) Aleenas café

Singles

- (2003) "Butt Naked"
- (2003) "Better Believe It"
- (2004) "Me & Tommy"
- (2005) "Hey Now!"
- (2005) "Modern Times"
