= Min önskejul =

Studio album by Sanna Nielsen
- Released: 1997
- Genre: Christmas; Pop; Schlager; Classical; Folk; Country
- Length: (1997) 33:41
- Label: Maybpole (1997); Mariann (2001 re-release)

Sanna Nielsen chronology
Silvertoner (1996)	Min önskejul (1997)	Nära mej, nära dej (2006)

2001 cover

Min önskejul was released in 1997 and is a Christmas album from Swedish singer Sanna Nielsen. "Där Bor En Sång" was released as a single.

The album was re-released on November 19, 2001, with three new tracks: "O Helga Natt", "Ave Maria" and "Tusen Ljus". Also, the artwork was new and the running order changed.

== 1997 Track listing ==
1. Min Önskejul
2. Jag Har Tänt Ett Juleljus
3. Tindra Stjärna I Juletid
4. Gläns Över Sjö Och Strand
5. Hör Hur Den Klingar
6. Julpotpurri (Hej, mitt vinterland, Jag såg mamma kyssa tomten, Bjällerklang)
7. Där Bor En Sång
8. Jul Vid Den Heliges Port
9. Juletid, Juletid
10. Jag Bor På En Stjärna (Pomp And Circumstance)
11. Då Är Det Jul (Jag Är En Gäst Och Främling)
12. Stilla Natt
13. Låt Mej Få Tända Ett Ljus

== 2001 Track listing ==
1. O helga natt
2. Jag bor på en stjärna (Pomp and Circumstance)
3. Min önskejul
4. Jul vid den Heliges Port
5. Jag har tänt ett juleljus
6. Juletid, juletid
7. Julpotpurri (Hej, mitt vinterland, Jag såg mamma kyssa tomten, Bjällerklang)
8. Gläns över sjö och strand
9. Tindra stjärna i juletid
10. Då är det jul
11. Ave Maria
12. Hör hur den klingar
13. Tusen ljus
14. Stilla natt
15. Där bor en sång
16. Låt mig få tända ett ljus
