= Vågar du, vågar jag =

Single by Sanna Nielsen

from the album Sanna 11-22
- A-side: "Vågar du, vågar jag"
- Released: 5 March 2007
- Genre: schlager
- Label: M&L Records
- Songwriters: Fredrik Kempe, Bobby Ljunggren, Henrik Wikström

Sanna Nielsen singles chronology
"Rör vid min själ" (2006)	"Vågar du, vågar jag" (2007)	"Empty Room" (2008)

"Vågar du, vågar jag" (English: "If you dare, I dare too") is a song written by Bobby Ljunggren, Fredrik Kempe and Henrik Wikström, and performed by Sanna Nielsen at Melodifestivalen 2007. The song participated at the semifinals in the town of Gävle on 24 February 2007, and reached the finals via Andra chansen in Nyköping on 3 March 2007. In the finale held in Stockholm Globe Arena, the song ended up in seventh place. On 5 March 2007 the song was released as a single, which peaked at number 10 on the Swedish singles chart.

The song also charted at Svensktoppen, entering the chart on 29 April 2007 reaching number eight on the chart. At Svensktoppen, the song peaked at 7th position during a visit lasting four weeks, ending with an eight position on 20 May 2007.

== Single track listing ==
1. Vågar du, vågar jag (radio edit)
2. Vågar du, vågar jag (SoundFactory club Mix)
3. Vågar du, vågar jag (SoundFactory Club Mix)
4. Vågar du, vågar jag (SoundFactory Radio Mix)
5. Vågar du, vågar jag (karaokeversion)

== Charts ==
Chart (2007)	Peak position
Sweden (Sverigetopplistan)	10
