= Du och jag mot världen =

Single by Fredrik Kempe & Sanna Nielsen

from the album Sanna 11-22
- A-side: "Du och jag mot världen" (original version)
- B-side: "Du och jag mot världen" (karaoke version)
- Released: 8 March 2005
- Genre: schlager
- Label: M&L Records
- Songwriters: Bobby Ljunggren, Fredrik Kempe, Henrik Wikström

Sanna Nielsen singles chronology
"Hela världen för mig" (2003)	"Du och jag mot världen" (2005)	"Rör Vid Min Själ" (2006)

"Du och jag mot världen" is a song written by Bobby Ljunggren, Fredrik Kempe and Henrik Wikström, and performed as a vocal duet by Fredrik Kempe and Sanna Nielsen at Melodifestivalen 2005. The song participated in the semifinal in Linköping on 19 February 2005, heading directly to the final inside the Stockholm Globe Arena on 12 March 2005, ending up 8th.

The single was released on 8 March 2005, peaking at 20th position at the Swedish singles chart.

The song was tested for Svensktoppen, and after two failed tests it spent one week on the chart, on 9th position on 10 April 2005 before leaving the chart.

== Charts ==
Chart (2005)	Peak position
Sweden (Sverigetopplistan)	20
