= Outtrigger (band) =

Swedish metal band

- Origin: Helsingborg, Sweden
- Genres: Metalcore, alternative metal, hard rock
- Years active: 2009–2018
- Members: John Löfgren; Simon Peyron; Joakim Agnemyr; Adam Axelsson
- Past members: Oliver Buvac; Timmy Andersson
- Website: www.outtrigger.se

Outtrigger was a Swedish metal group from Helsingborg established by Timmy Andersson and Simon Peyron in 2009 when they were classmates. In 2010, three other members joined in, Joakim Agnemyr, Adam Axelsson and John Lofgren, making it a 5-piece band. Originally lead vocals was Oliver Buvac, until he left and lead vocals was taken over by co-founder Simon Peyron. The band played live concerts and in 2012 came second in the music competition Rockkarusellen and again second in 2013 in Popkorn, Skåne's largest music competition.

The band's breakthrough came with a metal cover of Robin Stjernberg's song "You" the day after the song won the Melodifestivalen 2013.

In November 2013, it was announced that Outtriger was taking part in Melodifestivalen 2014 in a bid to represent Sweden in the 2014 Eurovision Song Contest. Singing their song "Echo" on February 15 preliminary semi-finals, they were given a Second Chance, with a duel against Elena Paparizou with Paparizou qualifying and Outtrigger failing to reach the Melodifestivalen final.

In 2018 Adam, Outrigger's lead guitar has officially announced that the band is no longer active.

== Members ==
- Simon Peyron - vocals (formerly also guitar)
- Joakim Agnemyr - bass
- Adam Axelsson - guitar
- John Lofgren - drums

Previous members

- Oliver Buvac - vocals
- Timmy Andersson - guitar

== Discography ==
=== EPs ===
- 2010: Untestified Revolution (EP)
- 2014: Echo (EP)
- 2014: The Last of Us

=== Singles ===
| Year | Single | Peak positions | Album |
| Year | Single | SWE | Album |
|---|---|---|---|
| 2013 | "Awaken Me" | – | |
| 2013 | "You" | – | |
| 2014 | "Blame on You" | – | |
| 2014 | "Echo" | 42 | |
| 2014 | "Superman is Dead" | – | |
