= Empty Room (Sanna Nielsen song) =

Single by Sanna Nielsen

from the album Stronger
- A-side: "Empty Room" (radio version)
- B-side: "Empty Room " (singback version)
- Released: 12 March 2008
- Genre: Pop
- Label: Lionheart International
- Songwriter(s): Bobby Ljunggren; Aleena Gibson

Sanna Nielsen singles chronology
"Vågar du, vågar jag" (2007)	"Empty Room" (2008)	"Nobody Without You" (2008)

Empty Room, written by Bobby Ljunggren and Aleena Gibson, is a ballad song about loss, missing someone and unrequited love, performed by Sanna Nielsen at Melodifestivalen 2008. Performing Empty Room, Sanna Nielsen did her English language-debut at Melodifestivalen.

The song made it directly from the competition in Västerås on 16 February 2008 to the final in the Stockholm Globe Arena on 15 March 2008. In the final, the song finished on second place, with totally 206 points, and won most points among telephone voters, 132 votes. The song was placed number 3 after the jury votes, who gave it 74 points.

The I-person of the song lyrics sings about losing a loved one, and describes the feelings like an empty room, before trying to move on in life.

The song won the 2008 OGAE Second Chance Contest.

== Hit song ==
The song became a major hit throughout Sweden, both at SR P4 and the commercial stations.

The song was tested for Svensktoppen, where it entered on 20 April 2008 and directly topped the chart, before it charted for 45 weeks, before it was heard at the chart for last time on 22 February 2009.

With 17 405 points, it also topped the 2008 Svensktoppen end of year chart .

The song was also tested for the Trackslistan chart, where it was placed for four weeks during the period 29 March – 20 April 2008, with the placings 4-5-14-18. The song was Sanna Nielsen's Trackslistan debut. The song peaked at 67th place at the 2008 Trackslistan end of year chart.

A video was also recorded.

At Allsång på Skansen on 1 July 2008, Sanna Nielsen performed the song, accompanied by an acoustic guitar.

== Single ==
The "Empty Room" single was released on 12 March 2008. On the Swedish singles chart, it peaked at number two.

=== Single track listing ===
1. Empty Room (radio version)
2. Empty Room (singback version)

== Charts ==
Chart (2008)	Peak position
Sweden	2

=== Year-end charts ===
Chart (2008)	Position
Swedish Singles Chart	7
