= I går, i dag =

Single by Sanna Nielsen

from the album Sanna 11-22
- A-side: "I går, i dag"
- B-side: "Still too Young"
- Released: March 2001
- Genre: schlager
- Label: Maypole
- Songwriter: Bert Månson

Sanna Nielsen singles chronology
"Time to Say Goodbye (Con Te Partiró)" (1999)	"I går, i dag" (2001)	"Hela världen för mig" (2003)

"I går, i dag" is a song written by Bert Månson, and performed by Sanna Nielsen at Melodifestivalen 2001, where it ended up third. In 2001, the song was also released as a single, peaking at #32 at the Swedish singles chat. The song also charted at Svensktoppen for 14 weeks between the period of 24 March-23 June 2001 before leaving the chart. peaking at second position. Using the Svensktoppen calculation system, the song became 9th most successful Svensktoppen song of 2001.

The single B-side was the same song with lyrics in English: "Still too Young".

== Track listing ==
1. I går, i dag
2. Still too Young (I går, i dag)

== Charts ==
Chart (2001)	Peak position
Sweden (Sverigetopplistan)	32
