= State of Drama =

Swedish musical group

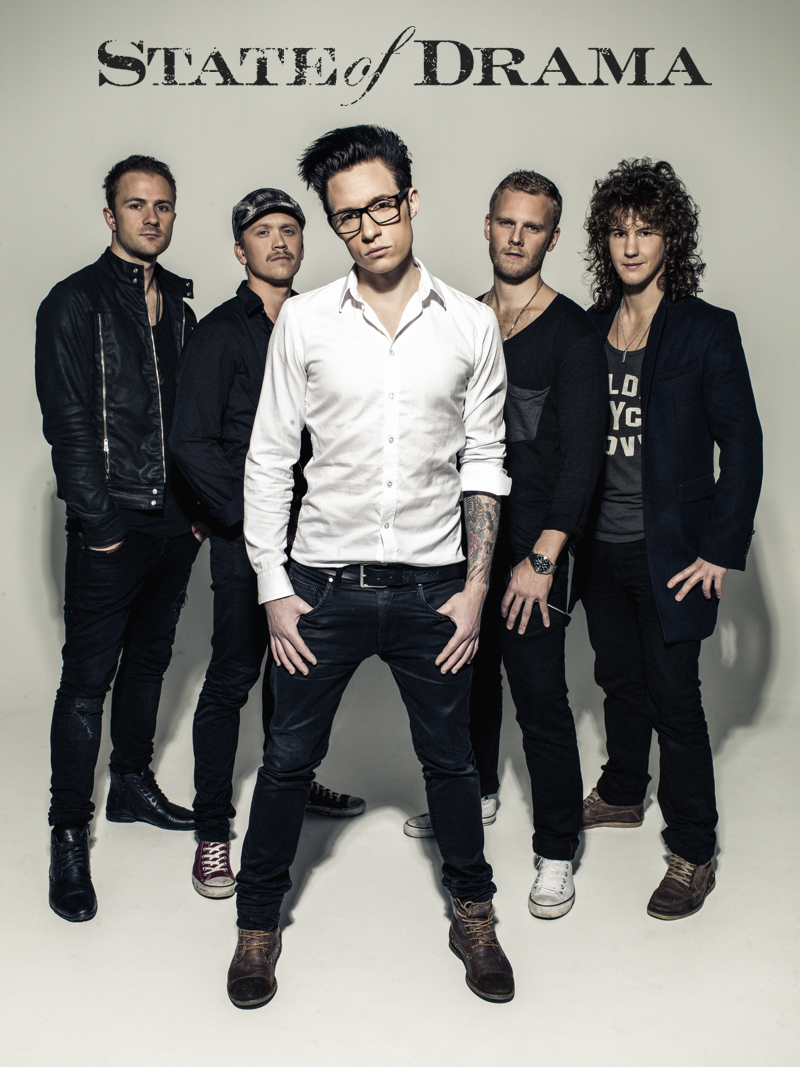

Background information
- Origin: Sweden
- Genres: Pop rock
- Years active: 2009—present
- Labels: Universal Music Sweden
- Members: Emil Gullhamn; Sebastian Hallifax; Stefan Koro; Rickard Olausson; John Isaksson
- Past members: Benny Klasson; Sven Gotting; Tommy Timonen
- Website: www.stateofdrama.com

State of Drama is a Swedish pop/rock band formed in 2009 by lead singer Emil Gullhamn, drummer Sebastian Hallifax, bass John Isaksson, guitar Rickard Olausson and keyboard Stefan Koro.

The group took part in "Svensktoppen nästa", a music competition organized by Swedish Radio P4, to search for new talents. The band finished at second place with their song "Maybe". The song was played with frequent rotation on radio and was a chart success. In spring 2012, State of Drama took part in yet another music competition, called Metro on Stage, with the song "Can't Find You Anywhere". Winning approximately a thousand votes in the first round, they reached the finals and eventually won the title. The prize was a marketing deal worth 3.5 million SEK.

About six months after winning Metro on Stage, the band participated in "Melodifestivalen" 2013, the Swedish race to the great Eurovision Song Contest. They competed with the song "Falling" in a bid to represent Sweden on semi-final, finishing 2nd place and qualifying straight to the final, where they finished in 9th place. They released their debut album Fighter in March 2013, just days before the Melodifestivalen final. The album includes their earlier hits "Maybe" and "Can't Find You Anywhere”. On the week preceding the final, their song "Falling" entered "Sverigetopplistan", the official Swedish Singles Chart, as number 16. Falling is played frequently on Spotify with almost 6 million streams. The popularity led to "Falling" earning a gold record. "Falling" became the second most played song on Swedish radio in 2013.

They appeared again in the Melodifestivalen 2014 with the song "All We Are".

In spring 2015, the album "Pre & Post Us” was released, followed by TV performances and gigs throughout Sweden.

State of Drama has been nominated for the prestigious award "Rockbjörnen" in the category best live act (2013 & 2014).

"Drown Clubmix", State of Drama's first club mix ever, was released in US in the summer of 2015. It is produced by the Grammy nominated DJ and producer, Mike Rizzo from New York.

The band is signed in Scandinavia with Universal Music Sweden, but is currently unsigned for the rest of the world.

== Discography ==
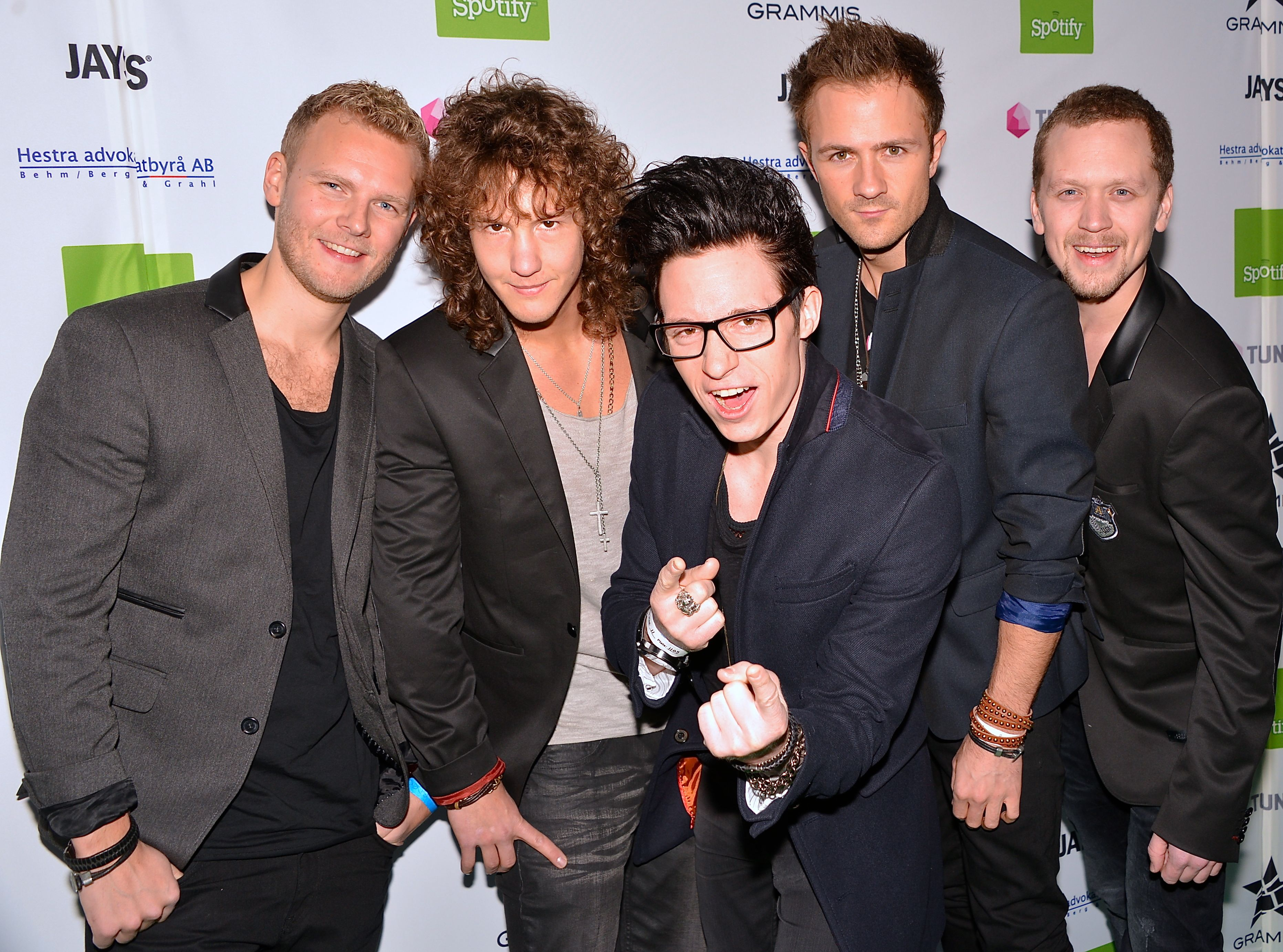
State of Drama at Grammisgalan in Cirkus, Stockholm (20 February 2013)

=== Studio albums ===
Title	Setails	Peak chart positions	Certifications
Title	Setails	SWE	Certifications
Fighter	Released: March 6, 2013; Label: Universal Music Sweden	10	

=== Extended plays ===
Title	Setails	Peak chart positions	Certifications
Title	Setails	SWE	Certifications
All We Are	Released: February 14, 2014; Label: Universal Music Sweden	–	
Pre & Post Us	Released: April 29, 2015; Label: Universal Music Sweden	–	

=== Singles ===
Title	Year	Peak positions	Certification	Album
Title	Year	SWE	Certification	Album
"Maybe"	2009	–		Fighter
"Falling"	2013	16	GLF: Gold	Fighter
"Fighter"	2013	–		Fighter
"All We Are"	2014	32		All We Are
"Paradise"	2014	–		Non-album singles
"Winter Lullaby"	2014	–		Non-album singles
"Pre And Post You"	2015	–		Pre & Post Us
