= I'm in Love (Sanna Nielsen album) =

Studio album by Sanna Nielsen
- Released: 2 March 2011
- Genre: Pop; Europop; Schlager
- Length: 51.27
- Label: Lionheart International, Universal Music Group

Sanna Nielsen chronology
Stronger (2008)	I'm in Love (2011)	Vinternatten (2012)

Singles from I’m in Love
- 1. "Devotion" Released: 2010; 2. "Part of Me" Released: 2010; 3. "I’m in Love" Released: 2011; 4. "Can't Stop Love Tonight" Released: 2011

I'm in Love is a studio album by Swedish singer Sanna Nielsen, released on 2 March 2011. It features her single "I'm in Love", which finished fourth in Melodifestivalen 2011. The album debuted at number three on the Swedish Albums Chart.

== Track listing ==
No.	Title	Writer(s)	Length
1.	"Devotion"	Bobby Ljunggren, Marcos Ubeda	3:16
2.	"I'm in Love"	Ljunggren, Irini Michas, Peter Boström, Thomas G:son	3:02
3.	"Part of Me"	Amir Aly, Henrik Wikström	3:37
4.	"Not Afraid to Love"	Wikström, Sanna Nielsen	4:01
5.	"If You Were Mine"	Ljunggren, Kristian Lagerström	3:05
6.	"Can't Stop Love Tonight"	Ubeda, Thomas G:son	3:00
7.	"Demolition Woman"	Aly, Wikström, Lagerström, Nielsen	3:20
8.	"This Time Love Is for Real"	Alexander Bard, Jakke Erixson, Oscar Holter	3:40
9.	"Take Me Home"	Erixson, Holter	3:27
10.	"Foolish Heart"	Wikström, Lagerström	3:30
11.	"Just Like That"	Wikström, Lagerström	3:44
12.	"Paradise"	Ljunggren, Ubeda	3:42

- Note: Track 12 ("Paradise") was included in part (as a bonus track) on Nielsen's 2008 album Stronger.

== Charts ==
=== Weekly charts ===
Chart (2011)	Peak position
Swedish Albums (Sverigetopplistan)	3

=== Year-end charts ===
Chart (2011)	Position
Swedish Albums (Sverigetopplistan)	65
