= Till en fågel =

Song by Sanna Nielsen

from the album Silvertoner
- Language: Swedish
- Released: 1996
- Genre: schlager
- Label: Maypole
- Songwriter: Bert Månson

"Till en fågel" is a song written by Bert Månson, and released in 1996 by Sanna Nielsen, during the year she would later turn 12 years old.

The single peaked at the 46th position at the Swedish singles chart. The song charted at Svensktoppen for 27 weeks between 18 May-2 October 1996, and also topped the chart.

== Charts ==
| Chart (1996) | Peak position |
|---|---|
| Sweden (Sverigetopplistan) | 46 |
