= Undo (Sanna Nielsen song) =

2014 song by Sanna Nielsen

Single by Sanna Nielsen

from the album 7
- Released: 23 February 2014
- Recorded: 2014
- Genre: Power pop, electropop
- Length: 3:10 (official version)
- Label: Parlophone
- Songwriters: Fredrik Kempe, David Kreuger, Hamed "K-One" Pirouzpanah

Sanna Nielsen singles chronology
"Viskar ömt mitt namn" (2012)	"Undo" (2014)	"En ton av tystnad" (2015)

Music video
- "Undo" on YouTube

Eurovision Song Contest 2014 entry
- Country: Sweden
- Artist: Sanna Nielsen
- Language: English
- Composers: Fredrik Kempe; David Kreuger; Hamed "K-One" Pirouzpanah
- Lyricists: Fredrik Kempe; David Kreuger; Hamed "K-One" Pirouzpanah

Finals performance
- Semi-final result: 2nd
- Semi-final points: 131
- Final result: 3rd
- Final points: 218

Entry chronology
- ◄ "You" (2013)
- "Heroes" (2015) ►

Song presentation
- file; help

Official performance video
- "Undo" (Semi-Final) on YouTube "Undo" (Final) on YouTube

"Undo" is a song by Swedish singer Sanna Nielsen. The track was written and composed by Fredrik Kempe, David Kreuger, Hamed "K-One" Pirouzpanah. It premiered on 8 February 2014, as part of the second semi-final in Melodifestivalen 2014. The song successfully progressed to the final. The single was officially released on 23 February 2014, part of the EP of the same title. Undo is an uptempo ballad.

On 8 March, the song won the Melodifestivalen 2014 final beating Ace Wilder's "Busy Doin' Nothin'" by only two points and represented Sweden in the Eurovision Song Contest 2014 in the first semifinal on 6 May.

In the final, on 10 May 2014, after the results came through, "Undo" finished the contest in 3rd place with 218 points. With this score, "Undo" became the second highest scoring Swedish entry at Eurovision after Euphoria.

"Undo" won the OGAE vote with 354 winning the voting after all countries had voted.

"Undo" was sung by Lucia Wu, a Chinese singer from Brazil on Season 1 of Sing! China in 2016. This led to the song charting on streaming platforms in China in October 2016.

A high-energy pop-funk-fusion cover of this song was arranged by the Swedish trio Dirty Loops and performed at the 2015 Swedish Melody Festival, in keeping with the Festival tradition of an artist performing a cover of the last year's Festival.

== Critical reception ==
The song's reviews were mostly positive and was often described as the selection's favorite. Olivier Rocher of Oikotimes described it as "the hot favorite of the night". He also said that "Undo" is less memorable compared to her previous Melodifestivalen entries. Billy Xifaras of Wiwibloggs said that Nielsen is perhaps one of the strongest artists in the second semi-final. He also compared the song with "Wrecking Ball" by saying that "in the beginning it is similar to Miley Cyrus' hit".

With 10 reviews from the Wiwibloggs, "Undo" received an average of 8.2 out of 10, the second highest score at the final of Melodifestivalen, with Helena Paparizou's "Survivor" being first with an average of 8.48 out of 10.

== Melodifestivalen ==
Being Nielsen's seventh participation in the selection, "Undo" participated in the second semi-final of the 2014 Melodifestivalen which was held in Linköping's Cloetta Center on 8 February 2014. The previews of the second semi-final songs, including "Undo", were published on 6 February 2014.

The song was performed sixth at the second semi-final. It direct qualified to the final as it got one of the first two places. Right after the second chance, the running order of the final was revealed with "Undo" being performed at the eighth place. "Undo" won the selection just with two points ahead Ace Wilder; it received 90 points from the international jury and 122 points from the public.

== Track listing ==
Digital EP
No.	Title	Writer(s)	Length
1.	"Undo"	Fredrik Kempe, David Kreuger, Hamed "K-One" Pirouzpanah	3:07
2.	"Rainbow"	Ina Wroldsen, Per Magnusson, Kreuger	3:59
3.	"Ready"	Magnusson, Kreuger, Kempe, Sharon Vaughn	3:50
4.	"You First Loved Me"	Magnusson, Kreuger, Kempe, Vaughn, Kimberley Walsh	3:36

Swedish, German, Swiss and Austrian CD single
No.	Title	Writer(s)	Length
1.	"Undo"	Kempe, Kreuger, Pirouzpanah	3:10
2.	"Undo" (instrumental)	Kempe, Kreuger, Pirouzpanah	3:10

Scandinavian digital download — remixes
No.	Title	Writer(s)	Length
1.	"Undo" (BrainBeaters radio edit)	Kempe, Kreuger, Pirouzpanah	3:02
2.	"Undo" (BrainBeaters remix)	Kempe, Kreuger, Pirouzpanah	5:09
3.	"Undo" (Eray Oktav & K-One radio edit)	Kempe, Kreuger, Pirouzpanah	4:01
4.	"Undo" (Eray Oktav & K-One extended)	Kempe, Kreuger, Pirouzpanah	5:30
5.	"Undo" (Peet Syntax & Alexie Divello Late Night radio edit)	Kempe, Kreuger, Pirouzpanah	3:43
6.	"Undo" (Peet Syntax & Alexie Divello Late Night club mix)	Kempe, Kreuger, Pirouzpanah	5:28

== Charts ==
=== Weekly charts ===
Chart (2014)	Peak position
Australia (ARIA)	81
Austria (Ö3 Austria Top 40)	12
Belgium (Ultratop 50 Flanders)	25
Belgium (Ultratop 50 Wallonia)	48
Denmark (Tracklisten)	5
Finland Download (Latauslista)	7
France (SNEP)	131
Germany (GfK)	32
Iceland (RÚV)	11
Ireland (IRMA)	21
Netherlands (Single Top 100)	21
Scotland Singles (OCC)	39
Sweden (Sverigetopplistan)	2
Switzerland (Schweizer Hitparade)	11
UK Singles (OCC)	40

=== Year-end charts ===
Chart (2014)	Position
Sweden (Sverigetopplistan)	52

=== Certifications ===
Region	Certification	Certified units/sales
Sweden (GLF)	Gold	20,000^{‡}
^{‡} Sales+streaming figures based on certification alone.
