= I'm in Love (Sanna Nielsen song) =

Single by Sanna Nielsen

from the album I'm in Love
- A-side: "I'm in Love"
- Released: March 2011
- Genre: Pop
- Songwriter(s): Peter Boström, Thomas G:son, Bobby Ljunggren, Irini Michas

Sanna Nielsen singles chronology
"Part of Me" (2010)	"I'm in Love" (2011)	"Can't Stop Love Tonight" (2011)

I'm in Love is a song written by Bobby Ljunggren, Thomas G:son, Irini Michas and Peter Boström. The song was performed by Sanna Nielsen at Melodifestivalen 2011 in the semifinal in Gothenburg on 12 February 2011. The song received the most votes and reached the final in the Stockholm Globe Arena, where it ended up 4th with 114 points. The song also charted at Svensktoppen, entering on 17 April 2011. and stayed at the chart for four weeks before leaving the chart.

== Track listing ==
Digital Download

1. I'm in Love (2:59)

SoundFactory Remixes

1. I'm in Love (SoundFactory Radio Mix) (4:22)
2. I'm in Love (SoundFactory Paradise Anthem) (7:00)
3. I'm in Love (SoundFactory Dub Mix) (7:00)

== Chart performance ==
=== Weekly charts ===
Chart (2011)	Peak position
Sweden (Sverigetopplistan)	32

== Release history ==
Region	Date	Format
Sweden	14 April 2014	CD
