= Sanna Nielsen =

Swedish singer, television presenter and musical theatre performer (born 1984)

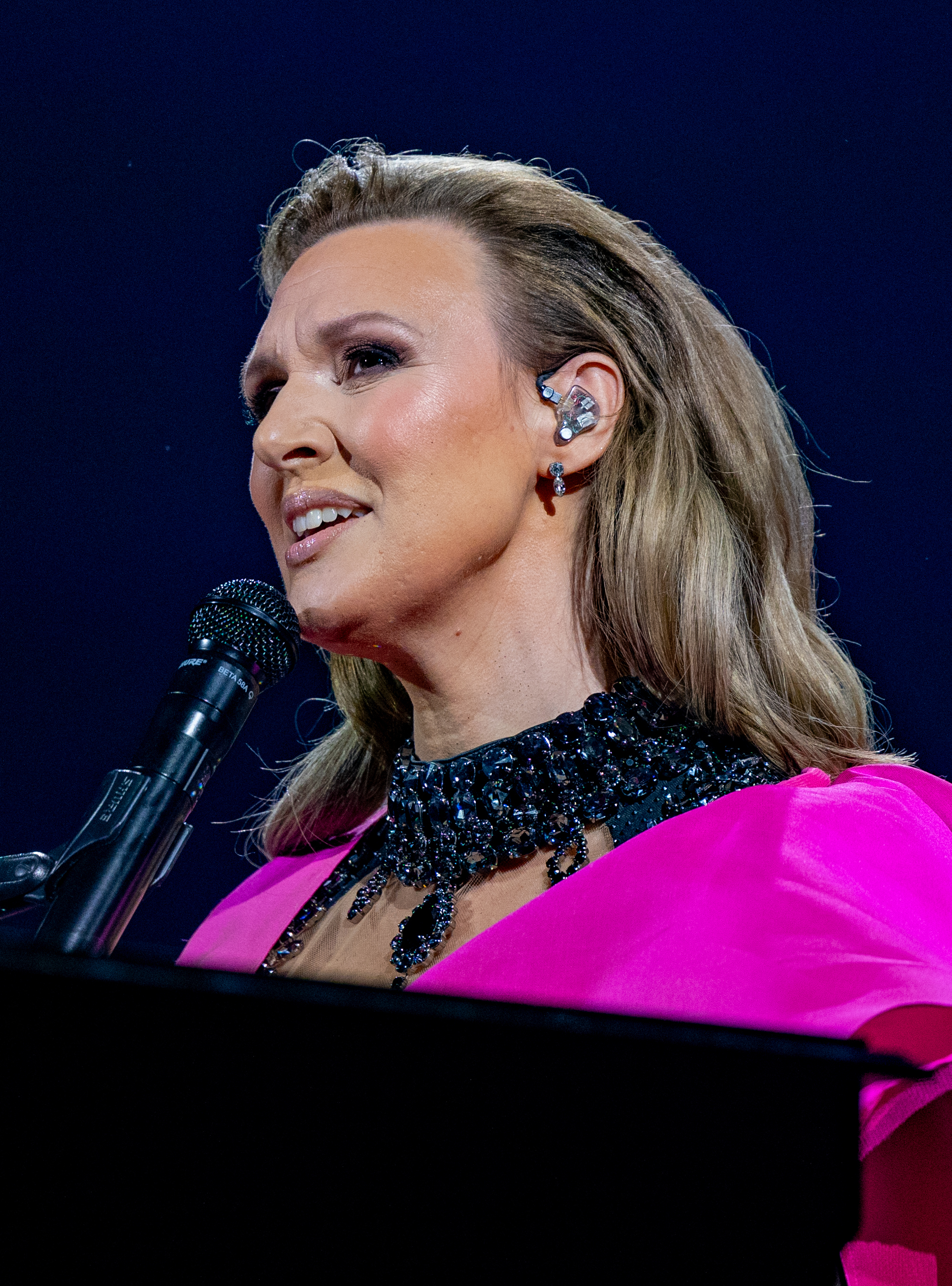
- Nielsen in 2025

Background information
- Born: Sanna Viktoria Nielsen; 27 November 1984 (age 41); Edenryd, Scania, Sweden
- Genres: Pop; schlager; soul; dansband music (early career)
- Occupations: Singer; television presenter; musical theatre performer
- Years active: 1996–present
- Labels: Warner, Parlophone

Sanna Viktoria Nielsen (born 27 November 1984) is a Swedish singer, television presenter and musical theatre performer. On her seventh attempt, she won Melodifestivalen in 2014 with the song "Undo" and so represented Sweden in the Eurovision Song Contest 2014 in Copenhagen, Denmark, finishing in 3rd place overall. Sanna was one of the Eurovision Song Contest 2015 commentators for Sweden and hosted Melodifestivalen 2015 along with comedian Robin Paulsson. She was announced as the new presenter for the sing-along show Allsång på Skansen for the summer of 2016. She hosted Eurovision The Party at the Tele2 Arena for the Eurovision Song Contest 2016.

== Career ==
Nielsen was born and grew up in the town of Edenryd in Bromölla Municipality, Skåne. Her paternal grandfather was a Dane from Århus. Nielsen's career started at several talent searches, the first being in 1992 in Olofström. In 1994 she participated in a talent search in Kallinge and won with the song "Can You Feel the Love Tonight". Nielsen performed with the danceband Mats Elmes in 1995 and 1996 at the age of eleven.

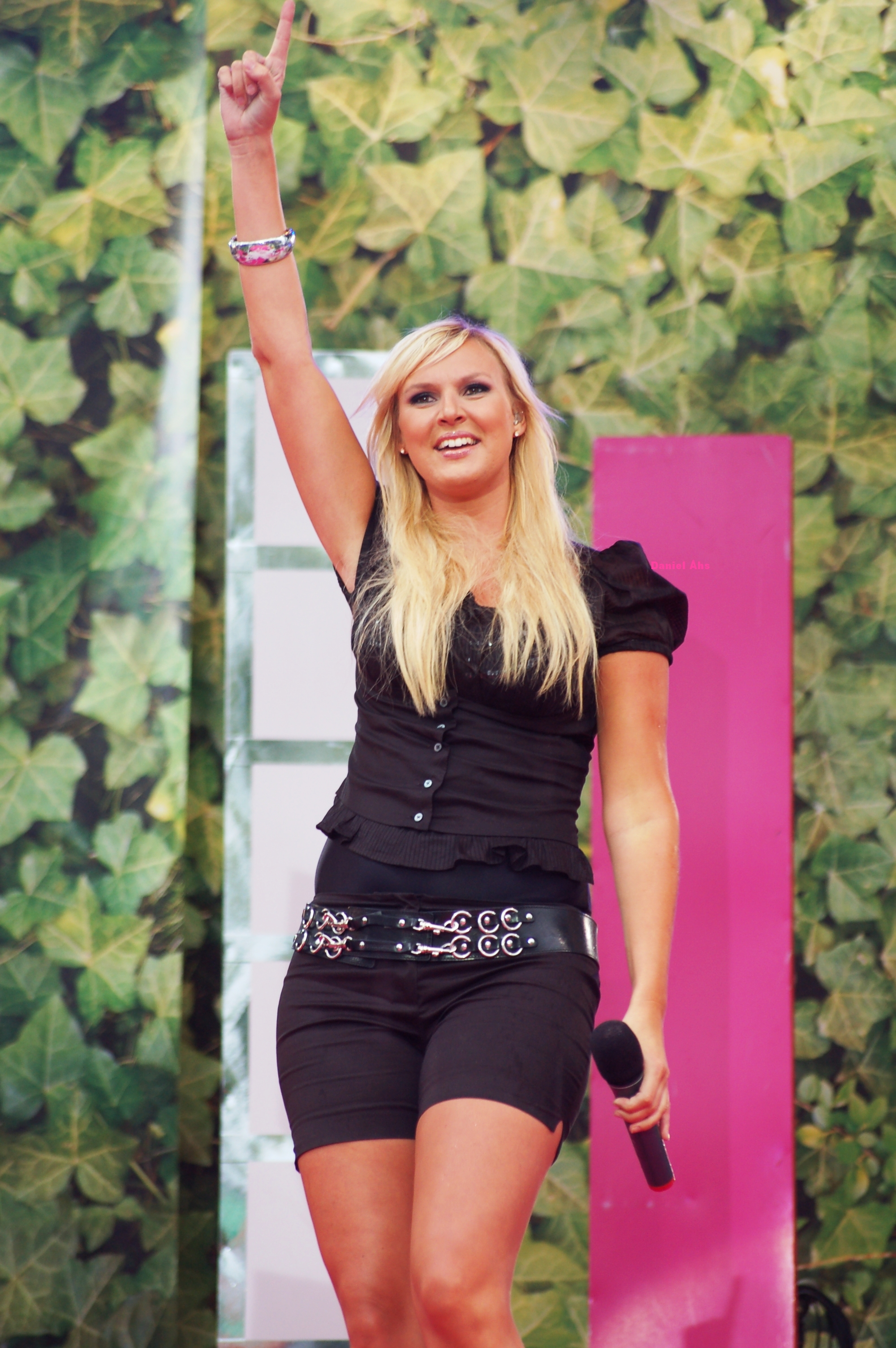
Sanna Nielsen at Sommarkrysset in 2008.

At the same time she reached the number one spot on the Svensktoppen chart with the song "Till en fågel". Nielsen became the youngest person to reach number one at the chart.

In September 1996, Nielsen's debut album Silvertoner was released. A reviewer of the album for Göteborgs-Posten compared Nielsen to Carola Häggkvist and Sissel Kyrkjebø. During the following years Nielsen released the album Min önskejul in 1997 and the single "Time to Say Goodbye" in 1999. During her high school years, she studied the Estetichal programme and music at Helenehoms Gymnastin in Malmö.

In December 2001, Nielsen participated in a Christmas tour along with Christer Sjögren, Sten Nilsson and Charlotte Perrelli. In 2002 she toured with Roger Pontare and in December the same year she participated in a Christmas concert with Kalle Moraeus and Tito Beltran in both 2003 and 2004.

In February 2006, her second solo music album Nära mej, nära dej was released with lyrics and music by Fredrik Kempe and Marcos Ubeda. In July–August 2007 she was on a new music tour called Sommar, Sommar, Sommar along with Shirley Clamp and Sonja Aldén. In April 2008 the album Stronger was released, an album completely in English, the first time Nielsen had such an album. The same year the album Our Christmas was released, containing Christmas songs along with Shirley Clamp and Sonja Aldén.

In 2011, she released the album I'm In Love. In December 2013 Nielsen released her seventh studio album called Min jul, which contains Christmas songs.

=== Participation in Melodifestivalen ===
Nielsen has participated seven times in Melodifestivalen, Sweden's annual music competition and national selection for the Eurovision Song Contest. She made her debut in 2001 performing "I går, i dag", which finished third. She returned to the contest again in 2003 with "Hela världen för mig" finishing fifth. After a one-year break, Nielsen returned again in Melodifestivalen 2005 with "Du och jag mot världen", this time as a duet with Fredrik Kempe, which finished eighth.

==== 2007 ====
On 3 March 2007, Nielsen participated in Melodifestivalen again with "Vågar du, vågar jag". During the Second Chance round, the song qualified for the final at the Stockholm Globe Arena on 10 March 2007, where the song ended up in seventh place after the final of Melodifestivalen 2007.

==== 2008 ====
Nielsen participated in Melodifestivalen 2008, performing "Empty Room", written and composed by Bobby Ljunggren and Aleena Gibson. She reached the final from the Västerås semifinal on 16 February 2008. Although the song won the public televote in the final inside the Stockholm Globe Arena on 15 March, beating Charlotte Perrelli's second-placed song "Hero" by more than 50,000 votes, it was denied the chance to represent Sweden at the Eurovision Song Contest after losing out to Perrelli in the overall points-based scoring system once the jury vote was factored into the results, thus finishing only second in the final official standings.

During 2008, "Empty Room" won the OGAE Second Chance Contest 2008 with a 91 points lead to runner-up Coral from Spain.

==== Return in 2011 ====
Nielsen participated in the Melodifestivalen 2011, with the song "I'm in Love". She came first at the second semi-final which took place in Gothenburg on 12 February 2011. One month later, she finished fourth at the finale.

==== Melodifestivalen win and Eurovision 2014 ====
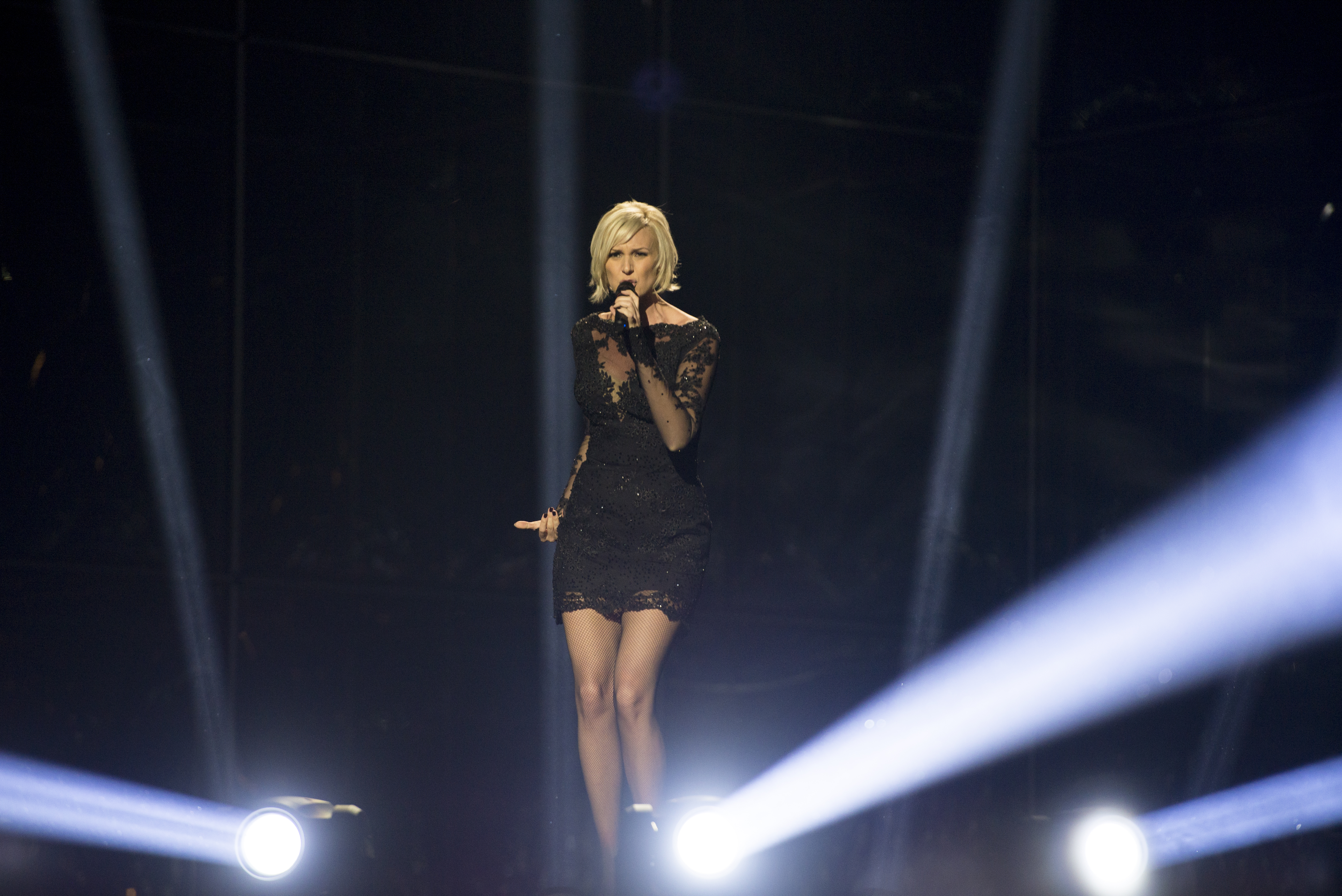
Sanna Nielsen performing at Eurovision 2014

Nielsen decided to return to the contest in 2014, this time with the song "Undo". She competed in the second semifinal held on 8 February, in which she qualified for the final, held at the Friends Arena, Stockholm on 8 March. She won the final and represented Sweden at the Eurovision Song Contest 2014 in Copenhagen, Denmark in the first semifinal on 6 May. Nielsen made it to the final. In the final Nielsen placed third place with 218 points. That also placed Nielsen as the second highest scoring singer for Sweden at the Eurovision after Loreen in 2012. Undo became Nielsens first song to reach the UK Top 40 singles charts at place 40

=== After Eurovision 2014 ===
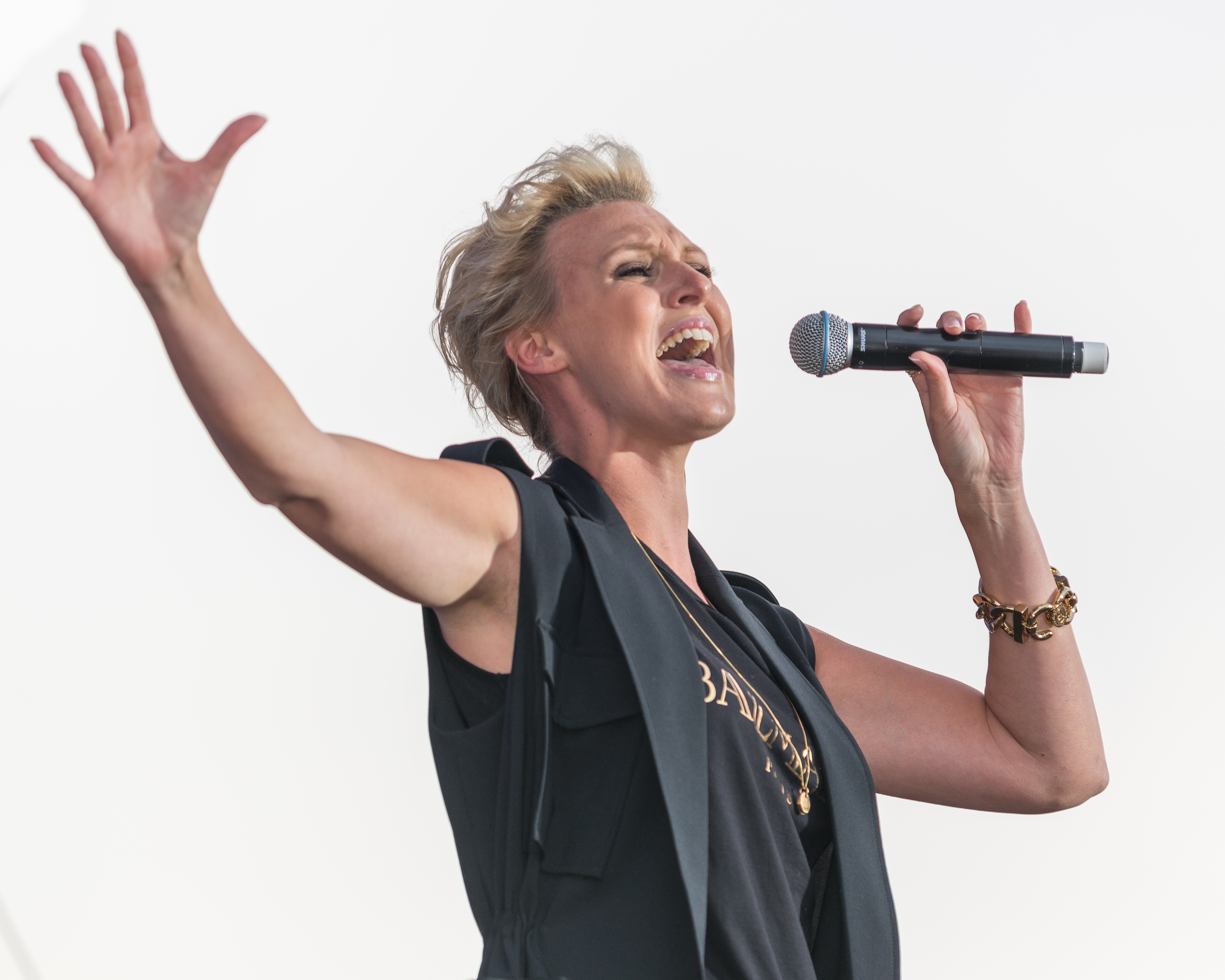
Sanna Nielsen performing at Stockholm Pride 2015

On 29 September 2014, Nielsen was announced as the host for Melodifestivalen 2015 along with comedian Robin Paulsson.

On 10 April 2015, it was announced that Nielsen and Edward af Sillén would commentate the SVT broadcast of the Eurovision Song Contest 2015.

In August 2015 it was announced by SVT that Nielsen would become the new presenter for the all-sing show Allsång på Skansen at Skansen in Stockholm in the summer of 2016.

Nielsen returned to Eurovision when she hosted the "Eurovision The Party" event that was held at the Tele2 Arena on the night of the Eurovision Song Contest 2016 final.

Sanna returned to Eurovision travelling to Lisbon in May 2018 as a commentator for the national Swedish broadcaster, Sveriges Television (SVT).

On December 2, 2025, SVT officially announced that Nielsen would return in Melodifestivalen 2026 with the song "Waste Your Love". She placed tenth in the final.

Sanna Nielsen provided commentary for Sveriges Television (SVT) at Eurovision 2018

== Personal life ==
Sanna Nielsen got engaged in 2006 in Las Vegas, the couple lived in Lidingö outside Stockholm before splitting up in 2008. She is currently living in Årsta south of Stockholm with her boyfriend Joakim Ramsell. Their son was born in October 2021.

== Discography ==
Studio albums

- Silvertoner (1996)
- Min önskejul (1997)
- Nära mej, nära dej (2006)
- Stronger (2008)
- I'm in Love (2011)
- Vinternatten (2012)
- Min jul (2013)
- 7 (2014)

== Musical theatre ==
- Doctor Zhivago (Malmö Opera, 2014), as Lara Antipova
- Funny Girl (Malmö Opera, 2020, 2023), as Fanny Brice

== Awards ==
- 2002 – Ulla Billquist-stipendiet, 25,000 kronor
- 2002 – Birgit Nilssons stipendium
- 2003 – Skåning of the Year
- 2008 – Song of the Year for "Empty Room" at the 2009 Gaygalan Awards
- 2008 – Lidingöbo of the Year
- 2018-2019 – female presenter of the year

== See also ==
- Swedish popular music

Preceded by (Sweden) Måns Zelmerlöw	OGAE Second Chance Contest winner 2008	Succeeded by (Denmark) Hera Björk
Preceded by Robin Stjernberg	Melodifestivalen winner 2014	Succeeded by Måns Zelmerlöw
