= Fredrik Kempe =

Swedish singer-songwriter (born 1972)

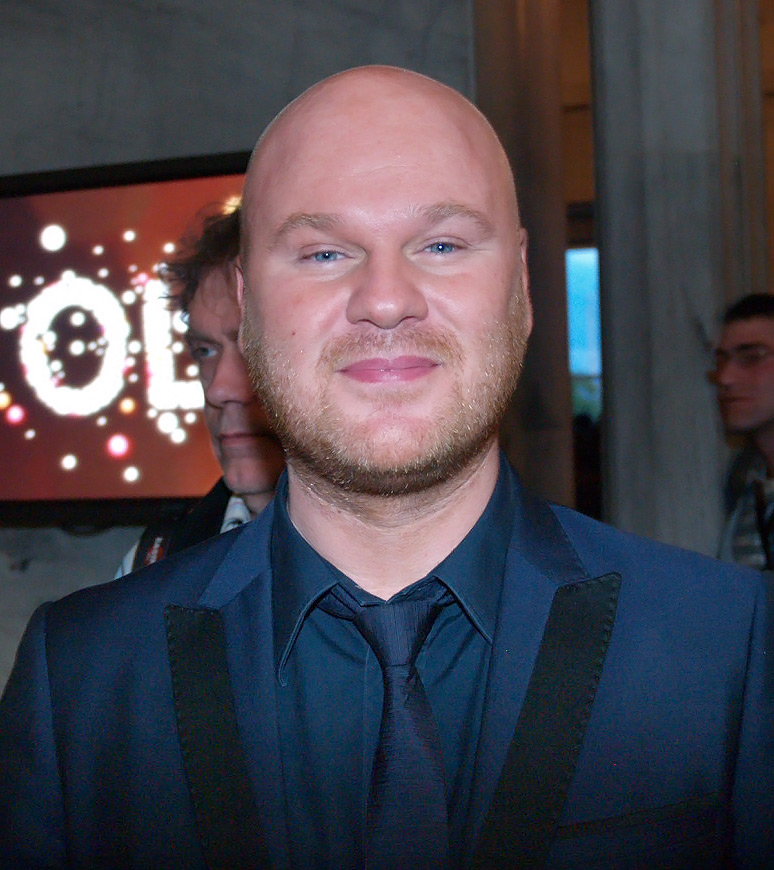
Fredrik Kempe (2010)

Fredrik Kempe (born 29 April 1972) is a Swedish songwriter and opera and pop singer, who was born in Vårgårda. He has participated in Swedish versions of the musicals Les Misérables and Chess. In 2002, Kempe had a hit with Vincerò, where he mixed opera and Euro disco. He was a jury member in Idol 2016 which was broadcast on TV4. From 2013 to 2020, he was married to Christoffer Järkeborn.

== Melodifestivalen ==
Kempe has participated in Melodifestivalen twice as a performer. He entered Melodifestivalen 2004 with the song "Finally", a tribute to his favourite composer Benny Andersson and in 2005 together with Sanna Nielsen singing Du och jag mot världen.

In Melodifestivalen 2007, he co-wrote three songs. One was "Cara Mia", performed by Måns Zelmerlöw and another was "Vågar du, vågar jag", performed by Sanna Nielsen. In Melodifestivalen 2008 he co-wrote the music and wrote the lyrics to the winning entry, "Hero", performed by Charlotte Perrelli. Once again in 2009, he wrote the music and lyrics for the winning song "La voix" performed by Malena Ernman. In 2011 he won Melodifestivalen for the third time, writing the Eric Saade entry "Popular". in 2014 he won Melodifestivalen for a fourth time, writing Sanna Nielsen's entry "Undo".

=== Entries ===
Year	Song	Artist	Music/lyrics	Results
2004	"Finally"	Fredrik Kempe	Fredrik Kempe (music and lyrics)	8th in second-chance-round
2005	"Du och jag mot världen"	Fredrik Kempe and Sanna Nielsen	Bobby Ljunggren (music), Fredrik Kempe (music and lyrics), Henrik Wikström (music)	8th place
2007	"Cara Mia"	Måns Zelmerlöw	Fredrik Kempe (music and lyrics), Henrik Wikström (music)	3rd place
2007	"Rainbow Star"	Regina Lund	Fredrik Kempe (music and lyrics), Bobby Ljunggren (music), Regina Lund (lyrics)	8th in semifinal
2007	"Vågar du, vågar jag"	Sanna Nielsen	Bobby Ljunggren (music), Fredrik Kempe (music and lyrics), Henrik Wikström (music)	7th place
2008	"Pame (Πάμε)"	Daniel Mitsogiannis	Fredrik Kempe (music and lyrics), Henrik Wikström (music)	7th in semifinal
2008	"Hero"	Charlotte Perrelli	Fredrik Kempe (music and lyrics), Bobby Ljunggren (music)	Winner
2009	"Hope & Glory"	Måns Zelmerlöw	Fredrik Kempe (music and lyrics), Måns Zelmerlöw (lyrics), Henrik Wikström (music)	4th place
2009	"You're Not Alone"	BWO	Fredrik Kempe (music and lyrics), Alexander Bard (music and lyrics), Anders Hansson (music and lyrics)	6th in second-chance-round
2009	"Moving On"	Sarah Dawn Finer	Sarah Dawn Finer (music and lyrics), Fredrik Kempe (music and lyrics)	6th place
2009	"La voix"	Malena Ernman	Malena Ernman (lyrics), Fredrik Kempe (music and lyrics)	Winner
2010	"Manboy"	Eric Saade	Fredrik Kempe (music and lyrics), Peter Boström (music)	3rd place
2010	"Hollow"	Peter Jöback	Anders Hansson (music and lyrics), Fredrik Kempe (music and lyrics)	9th place
2011	"Alive"	Linda Pritchard	Oscar Görres (music and lyrics), Fredrik Kempe (music and lyrics)	6th in second-chance-round
2011	"Popular"	Eric Saade	Fredrik Kempe (music and lyrics)	Winner
2011	"The King"	The Playtones	Peter Kvint (music and lyrics), Fredrik Kempe (music and lyrics)	6th place
2011	"Tid att andas"	Simon Forsberg	Fredrik Kempe (music and lyrics)	8th in semifinal
2012	"The Girl"	Charlotte Perrelli	Alexander Jonsson (music and lyrics), Fredrik Kempe (music and lyrics)	5th in semifinal
2012	"Youngblood"	Youngblood	Fredrik Kempe (music and lyrics), David Kreuger (music and lyrics)	6th in second-chance-round
2013	"Burning Flags"	Cookies 'N' Beans	Fredrik Kempe (music and lyrics)	7th in second-chance-round
2013	"Begging"	Anton Ewald	Fredrik Kempe (music and lyrics), Anton Malmberg Hård af Segerstad (music and lyrics)	4th place
2013	"Heartstrings"	Janet Leon	Fredrik Kempe (music and lyrics), Anton Malmberg Hård af Segerstad (music and lyrics)	5th in semifinal
2014	"Bröder"	Linus Svenning	Fredrik Kempe (music and lyrics)	5th place
2014	"Undo"	Sanna Nielsen	Fredrik Kempe (music and lyrics), David Kreuger (music and lyrics), Hamed Pirouzpanah (music and lyrics)	Winner
2014	"Yes We Can"	Oscar Zia	Fredrik Kempe (music and lyrics), David Kreuger (music and lyrics), Hamed Pirouzpanah (music and lyrics)	8th place
2014	"Blame It On The Disco"	Alcazar	Fredrik Kempe (music and lyrics), David Kreuger (music and lyrics), Hamed Pirouzpanah (music and lyrics)	3rd place
2015	"Sting"	Eric Saade	Sam Arash Fahmi (music and lyrics), Fredrik Kempe (music and lyrics), David Kreuger (music and lyrics), Hamed "K-one" Pirouzpanah (music and lyrics)	5th place
2015	"Forever Starts Today"	Linus Svenning	Aleena Gibson (music and lyrics), Anton Malmberg Hård af Segerstad (music and lyrics), Fredrik Kempe (music and lyrics)	6th place
2015	"I See You"	Kristin Amparo	Kristin Amparo (music and lyrics), Fredrik Kempe (music and lyrics), David Kreuger (music and lyrics)	Out in second-chance-round
2016	"Bada nakna"	Samir & Viktor	David Kreuger (music and lyrics), Anderz Wrethov (music and lyrics), Fredrik Kempe (music and lyrics)	12th place
2018	"Party Voice"	Jessica Andersson	Fredrik Kempe, David Kreuger, Niklas Carson Mattsson, Jessica Andersson	11th place
2018	"Fuldans"	Rolandz	Fredrik Kempe, David Kreuger, Robert Gustafsson, Regina Hedman	10th place
2019	"Norrsken (Goeksegh)"	Jon Henrik Fjällgren	Fredrik Kempe, David Kreuger, Niklas Carson Mattsson, Jon Henrik Fjällgren	4th place
2021	"Horizon"	Jessica Andersson	David Kreuger, Fredrik Kempe, Marcus Lidén, Christian Holmström	5th in semifinal
2021	"Beat of Broken Hearts"	Klara Hammarström	David Kreuger, Fredrik Kempe, Niklas Carson Mattson, Andreas Wijk	6th place
2024	"Hela världen väntar"	Samir & Viktor	David Kreuger, Fredrik Kempe, Niklas Carson Mattson	4th in heat

== Melodi Grand Prix ==
In 2010 he composed and co-wrote the Norwegian entry, "My Heart Is Yours", for the Eurovision Song Contest 2010, performed by Didrik Solli-Tangen.

== Discography ==
- Bohème (2004-04-21)
- Songs For Your Broken Heart (2002-12-02)
