= Sweden in the Eurovision Song Contest 2003 =

- Eurovision Song Contest 2003
- Participating broadcaster: Sveriges Television (SVT)
- Country: Sweden
- Selection process: Melodifestivalen 2003
- Selection date: 15 March 2003

Competing entry
- Song: "Give Me Your Love"
- Artist: Fame
- Songwriters: Carl Lösnitz; Calle Kindbom

Placement
- Final result: 5th, 107 points

Participation chronology

Sweden was represented at the Eurovision Song Contest 2003 with the song "Give Me Your Love", written by Carl Lösnitz and Calle Kindbom, and performed by the duo Fame. The Swedish participating broadcaster Sveriges Television (SVT) selected its entry through Melodifestivalen 2003.

== Before Eurovision ==
=== Melodifestivalen 2003 ===
Sveriges Television (SVT) organised Melodifestivalen 2003 in order to select its entry for the Eurovision Song Contest 2003. Just like the year before, four heats and a "second chance" round with eight songs in each were held. 2 from each went to the final. The winner was chosen by 11 regional juries (50%) and televoting (50%) were Fame consisting of Jessica Andersson and Magnus Bäcklund. Their song, written by Calle Kindbom and Carl Lösnitz, was called "Give Me Your Love", and was a typical schlager–disco song.

==== Heats and Viewers' Choice round ====
- The first heat took place on 15 February 2003. "Let Your Spirit Fly" performed by Pernilla Wahlgren and Jan Johansen and "Crazy in Love" performed by Jill Johnson qualified directly to the final, while "Carnaval" performed by Méndez and "Television" performed by Markus Landgren advanced to the Viewers' Choice round. "Stronger" performed by Crosstalk, "Someone, Somewhere, Someday" performed by DeDe Lopez, "Ingen annan" performed by Alive feat. Jessie Martins and "Stop! Look! Listen!" performed by Da Buzz were eliminated from the contest.
- The second heat took place on 22 February 2003. "Give Me Your Love" performed by Fame and "Hela världen för mig" performed by Sanna Nielsen qualified directly to the final, while "Not a Sinner nor a Saint" performed by Alcazar and "15 minuter" performed by Brandsta City Släckers advanced to the Viewers' Choice round. "Just Like a Boomerang" performed by Andrés Esteche, "Let's Go" performed by Kerli and the Locatellis, "You" performed by Pandora and "Better Believe It" performed by Aleena were eliminated from the contest.
- The third heat took place on 1 March 2003. "Genom eld och vatten" performed by Sarek and "Bye Bye" performed by Barbados qualified directly to the final, while "Stay the Night" performed by Style and "Love Is All" performed by Liverpool advanced to the Viewers' Choice round. "Tonight's the Night" performed by Shanna Smith, "Evig kärlek" performed by Nanne Grönvall, "My Love" performed by Sofia Källgren and Robert Wells and "Mr. Memory" performed by Shirley Clamp were eliminated from the contest.
- The fourth heat took place on 8 March 2003. "Maria" performed by Östen med Resten and "Aqua Playa" performed by Afro-dite qualified directly to the final, while "TKO (Knock You Out)" performed by Bubbles and "Nothing Can Stop Me" performed by Lina Hedlund advanced to the Viewers' Choice round. "We're Unbreakable" performed by Sahlene, "No dudes en llamarme" performed by Fernando Brito, "He Is Always on My Mind" performed by Maarja and "Tills jag mötte dig" performed by Mikael Erlandsson were eliminated from the contest.
- The Viewers' Choice round (Tittarnas val) took place on 9 March 2003. "Not a Sinner nor a Saint" performed by Alcazar and "TKO (Knock You Out)" performed by Bubbles qualified to the final.

==== Final ====
The final took place on 15 March 2003 at the Globe Arena in Stockholm.

R/O	Artist	Song	Jury	Televote	Total	Place
1	Fame	"Give Me Your Love"	108	132	240	1
2	Jill Johnson	"Crazy in Love"	100	22	122	4
3	Östen med Resten	"Maria"	10	11	21	8
4	Afro-dite	"Aqua Playa"	48	0	48	7
5	Sanna Nielsen	"Hela världen för mig"	27	66	93	5
6	Barbados	"Bye Bye"	7	0	7	10
7	Sarek	"Genom eld och vatten"	11	44	55	6
8	Pernilla Wahlgren and Jan Johansen	"Let Your Spirit Fly"	90	88	178	2
9	Bubbles	"TKO (Knock You Out)"	10	0	10	9
10	Alcazar	"Not a Sinner nor a Saint"	62	110	172	3

== At Eurovision ==
On the night of the final Fame performed 25th in the running order, following Romania and preceding Slovenia. At the close of voting "Give Me Your Love" had received 107 points, placing country 5th of the 26 entries. This result meant that Sweden automatically qualified for the final in the 2004 contest.

=== Voting ===
Points awarded to Sweden
Score	Country
12 points	Romania
10 points	United Kingdom
8 points	Malta
7 points	Estonia; Norway; Poland; Spain
6 points	Latvia; Slovenia
5 points	Iceland; Israel; Ukraine
4 points	Belgium
3 points	Austria; Germany; Netherlands; Portugal
2 points	Croatia; France
1 point	Bosnia and Herzegovina; Cyprus

Points awarded by Sweden
Score	Country
12 points	Norway
10 points	Germany
8 points	Turkey
7 points	Iceland
6 points	Austria
5 points	Netherlands
4 points	Spain
3 points	Poland
2 points	Russia
1 point	Romania
