= Ingrosso =

Ingrosso is a surname. Notable people with the surname include:

- the Ingrosso family, a Swedish-Italian family
  - Benjamin Ingrosso (born 1997), Swedish singer
  - Bianca Wahlgren Ingrosso (born 1994), Swedish singer
  - Emilio Ingrosso (born 1965), Swedish dancer, composer, and restaurant owner
  - Oliver Ingrosso (born 1989), Swedish DJ, record producer and actor
  - Sebastian Ingrosso (born 1983), Swedish DJ and electronic dance music producer
- Gianmarco Ingrosso (born 1989), Italian football player

== See also ==
- Axwell and Ingrosso, a Swedish DJ/producer duo
