= 40.14.4 =

Studio album by Jessica Andersson
- Released: 16 October 2013
- Genre: Pop
- Label: BMG Chrysalis
- Producer: Ola Gustafsson; Peter LeMarc

Jessica Andersson chronology
Wake Up (2009)	40.14.4 (2013)	Perfect Now (2015)

40.14.4 is the second studio album by Swedish singer Jessica Andersson. The album was released in October 2013 and peaked at number six on the Swedish Albums Chart.

== Background and release ==
In 2003, Andersson, represented Sweden in the Eurovision Song Contest 2003 as part of Fame, coming fifth. In 2004, Andersson decided to pursue a career as a solo artist and has been successful as a singer, winning Let's Dance 2011 and released a biography which has sold over 120,000 copies. In 2012, Andersson signed with BMG Chrysalis and began writing the album. Andersson sings about her tough childhood and the traumas from that time. Andersson said 40.14.4 is different from what she has done before, with the music and lyrics being closer to what she likes to listen to; referencing artists like Lars Winnerbäck, Melissa Horn and Peter LeMarc. It is the first record she has written herself.

The number 40 in the album title refers to Jessica Andersson turning 40 one week following the release, 14 represents her youth and 4 her childhood.

== Track listing ==
Standard edition
No.	Title	Writer(s)	Length
1.	"Septembermorgon"	Jessica Andersson, Marit Bergman
2.	"Fötterna På Marken"	Andersson, Peter LeMarc
3.	"Aldrig, Aldrig"	Andersson, Bergman, LeMarc
4.	"Min Lilla Hand"	Andersson, Bergman
5.	"Tills Jag Finner Dig"	Andersson, LeMarc
6.	"ICA Maxi"	Kajsa Sundin, Bergman
7.	"Amigo"	Andersson, LeMarc
8.	"För Vems Skull Älskar Du?"	Andersson, LeMarc
9.	"Kom Ett Regn"	Andersson, LeMarc
10.	"Vaggsång Till Mig Själv"	LeMarc
11.	"Nödvändighet"	LeMarc

== Charts ==
Chart (2013)	Peak position
Swedish Albums (Sverigetopplistan)	6

== Release history ==
Region	Release Date	Format	Label	Catalogue
Europe	16 October 2013	Compact Disc, digital download	BMG Chrysalis	50538010886
