= Lagno =

Lagno, Lagnó or Lagnö may refer to

- Biosotis Lagnó (born 1969), Cuban basketball player
- Kateryna Lagno (born 1989), Russian chess grandmaster
- Norra Lagnö (literally Northern Lagnö), a locality in Sweden
