= Perfect Now =

Studio album by Jessica Andersson
- Released: 29 April 2015
- Genre: pop music
- Label: Universal Music Group
- Producer: Peter Månsson; Carl Utbult; Victor Thell

Jessica Andersson chronology
40.14.4 (2013)	Perfect Now (2015)	Once Upon a Christmas Night (2016)

Perfect Now is the third studio album by Swedish singer Jessica Andersson. The album was released in April 2015 and peaked at number three on the Swedish Albums Chart. The album includes her Melodifestivalen 2015 song, "Can't Hurt Me Now".

== Reception ==
Professional ratings
Review scores
Source	Rating
Arbetarbladet	2/5 stars
NWT	2/5 stars

Sigrid Ejemar was critical of the album, even questioning "perfect" in the title. Ejemar said "Perhaps the album has been called "Perfect" in the sense that there is no harm or personality here." saying the most exciting part is "the sparkling background Andersson poses in front of the cover". Ejemer complemented schlager songs "Start Over" and "Can't Hurt Me Now".

Johanna Karlsson was also critical saying "This album sounds very much like a Taylor Swift album, and it's not bad, but the problem is that Jessica Andersson is not actually Taylor Swift. There is no clear sender at all in this project and there is also no clear direction. Therefore, despite the spotless production, it becomes never engaging."

== Track listing ==
Standard edition
No.	Title	Writer(s)	Length
1.	"Can't Hurt Me Now"	Aleena Gibson, Fredrik Thomander	3:07
2.	"Stubborn"	Desmond Child, Keely Hawkes, Peter Månsson	3:50
3.	"Rain On Me"	Gibson, Victor Thell	3:01
4.	"Start Over"	Christian Fast, Janet Leon, Månsson	3:28
5.	"I Am"	Aidan O'Connor, Charlotte Nordin, Karin Wannbäck, Christian Schneider, Sara Biglert	3:25
6.	"If You Hear These Words" (with Anders Fernette)	Anders Fernette, Carl Utbult, Chris Meyer	3:13
7.	"You Found Me"	O'Connor, Nordin, Wannbäck, Schneider, Biglert	2:56
8.	"Heaven's Gotta Wait"	Jessica Andersson, Daniel Jelldéus, Emma Nors, Palle Hammarlund	3:14
9.	"What About Me"	Marcus Frenell, Beatrice Robertsson	3:30
10.	"Can't Hurt Me Now" (Janousek Remix)	Gibson, Thomander	3:22
11.	"Can't Hurt Me Now" (Karaoke Version)	Gibson, Thomander	3:07

== Charts ==
Chart (2015)	Peak position
Swedish Albums (Sverigetopplistan)	3

== Release history ==
Region	Release Date	Format	Label	Catalogue
Europe/Australia	29 April 2015	Compact Disc, digital download	Universal Music Group	060254731870
