= Elin Ek =

Elin Ek may refer to:

- Elin Ek (actress) (born 1976)
- Elin Ek (cross-country skier) (born 1973)
