= Linus Wahlgren =

Swedish actor (born 1976)

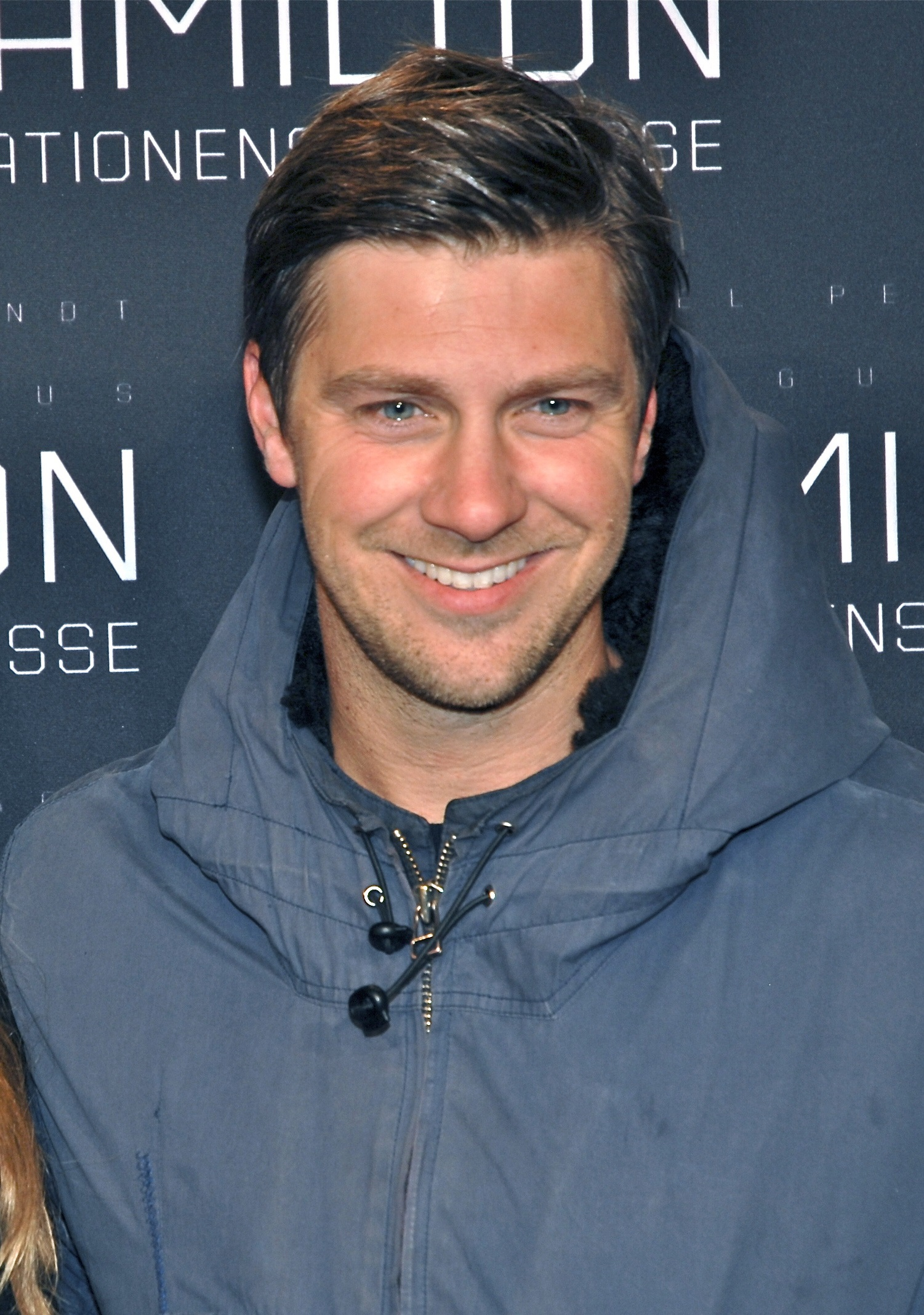
- Wahlgren in 2012
- Born: Linus Carl Henrik Wahlgren; 10 September 1976 (age 49); Värmdö, Sweden
- Occupation: Actor
- Spouse: Jessica Wahlgren
- Children: 2
- Parent(s): Hans Wahlgren (father); Christina Schollin (mother)
- Relatives: Pernilla Wahlgren (sister); Oliver Ingrosso (nephew); Benjamin Ingrosso (nephew); Bianca Ingrosso (niece)

Linus Carl Henrik Wahlgren (born 10 September 1976) is a Swedish actor. He is the son of actors Christina Schollin and Hans Wahlgren and brother to actors and singers Pernilla and Niclas Wahlgren. He has also appeared in a few episodes of his sister Pernilla Wahlgren's TV series Wahlgrens värld, which is broadcast on Kanal 5.

== Filmography ==
- 1983 – G – som i gemenskap
- 1994 – Bert
- 1997 – Rederiet
- 2000 – 102 Dalmatians (voice in Swedish dub)
- 2001 – Jimmy Neutron: Boy Genius (voice in Swedish dub)
- 2001 – Atlantis: The Lost Empire (voice in Swedish dub)
- 2002 – The Dog Trick
- 2004 – Mongolpiparen
- 2005 – Robots (voice in Swedish dub)
- 2005 – Den utvalde
- 2006 – Göta Kanal 2 – Kanalkampen
- 2008 – Irene Huss – Guldkalven
- 2009 – Scener ur ett kändisskap
- 2010 – Solsidan
- 2013 - Crimes of Passion
- 2014 – Blå Ögon (Blue Eyes) - Max Åhman in seven of the political thriller's 10 episodes
- 2016 - 30 Degrees in February (television)
- 2020 – Bäckström (television)
- 2024 - In the Name of God
- 2026 – Adult Supervision
