= Piccadilly Circus (song) =

1985 single by Pernilla Wahlgren

Single by Pernilla Wahlgren

from the album Pernilla Wahlgren
- Language: Swedish
- B-side: "Don't Run Away from Me Now"
- Released: 1985
- Genre: Synth-pop
- Length: 2:56 (album version); 2:57 (single version)
- Label: Glendisc
- Songwriters: Lasse Andersson; Bruno Glenmark
- Producers: Lasse Andersson; Bruno Glenmark

Pernilla Wahlgren singles chronology
"Nu har det tänt" (1984)	"Piccadilly Circus" (1985)	"Svindlande affärer" (1985)

"Piccadilly Circus" is a song written by Lars Andersson and Bruno Glenmark, and performed by Pernilla Wahlgren at Melodifestivalen 1985, where the song ended up fourth behind "Bra vibrationer", performed by Kikki Danielsson. The single peaked at second place at the Swedish singles chart. On 9 March 1985 the song entered Trackslistan. The song lyrics describe a love meeting at Piccadilly Circus.

Wahlgren entered stage with the brothers Vito and Emilio Ingrosso as dancers. Wahlgren was later criticised for wearing an Iron Cross-like item on stage, which was referred to as Nazi propaganda.

A Framåt fredag parody version was called "Inga djur på cirkus", describing Miljöpartiet in 2005 asking for stop using animals at circus shows in Sweden.

== Track listing and formats ==
- Swedish 7-inch single

A. "Piccadilly Circus" – 2:57
B. "Don't Run Away from Me Now" – 3:40

== Credits and personnel ==
- Pernilla Wahlgren – vocals
- Lasse Andersson – songwriter, producer, arranger
- Bruno Glenmark – songwriter, producer
- Maggie Williams – cover art, photographer

Credits and personnel adapted from the Pernilla Wahlgren album and 7-inch single liner notes.

== Charts ==
Weekly chart performance for "Piccadilly Circus"
Chart (1985)	Peak position
Sweden (Sverigetopplistan)	2
