= Hans Wahlgren =

Swedish actor (1937–2024)

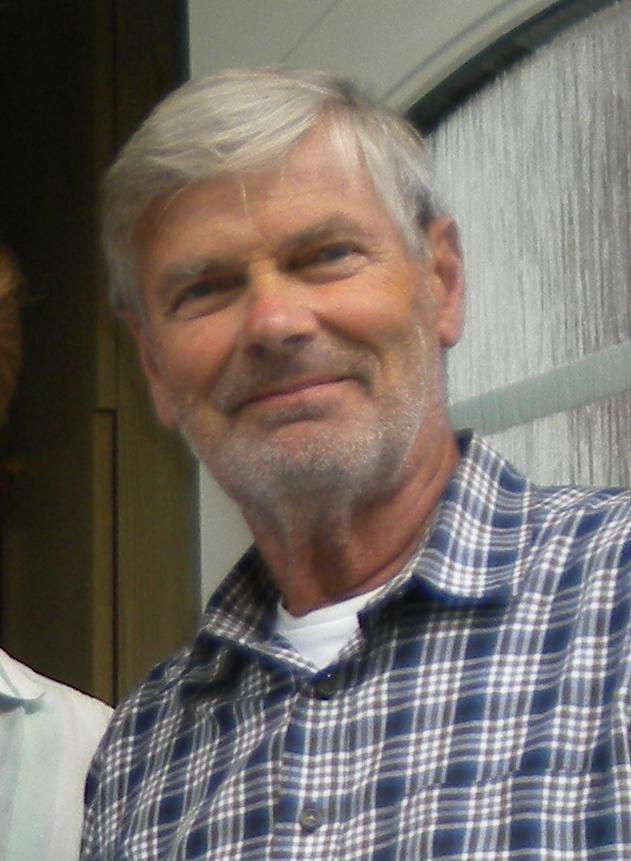
- Wahlgren in 2012
- Born: Hans Carl Gustav Wahlgren; 26 June 1937; Helsingborg, Sweden
- Died: 10 May 2024 (aged 86); Värmdö, Sweden
- Spouse: Christina Schollin (m. 1962)
- Children: 4, including Niclas, Pernilla and Linus
- Relatives: Oliver Ingrosso (grandson); Bianca Ingrosso (granddaughter); Benjamin Ingrosso (grandson)

Hans Carl Gustav Wahlgren (26 June 1937 – 10 May 2024) was a Swedish actor. During his career, Wahlgren appeared in films and television series, as well as his work in revues and farces such as Oh! Calcutta! As a voice actor, he dubbed for several children's films. In Wahlgren's later years, he was in his daughter Pernilla's reality series on television (2016-2024).

== Career ==
Wahlgren grew up in Smedslätten, and debuted in 1945 in Ragnar Falck's short film Indianer och blekansikten. His breakthrough came in the film Raggare in 1959. During eleven seasons he performed in the revue Hagges Revue in Gothenburg. In the revue he did impressions of famous people like Jan Malmsjö, Jarl Kulle, Carl XVI Gustaf and Claes af Geijerstam.

He performed in several farces and comedies at Stockholm's private theatres, and plays like Oh! Calcutta! and Pippi Longstocking at Folkan, and in Charleys tant and Spanska flugan at Vasateatern.

During the summer of 2001, he, along with Eva Rydberg, performed in the comedy Kärlek och lavemang at Fredriksdalsteatern in Helsingborg. He also did plenty of voice acting in several films such as Charlie and the Chocolate Factory and Nanny McPhee. He provided Charles Ingvar "Sickan" Jönsson's voice in the computer games Jönssonligan: Jakten på Mjölner and Jönssonligan går på djupet.

Between 2016 and 2024, Wahlgren participated in his daughter Pernilla Wahlgren's reality series Wahlgrens värld which is broadcast on Kanal 5 and the streaming service MAX.

On 22 May, after his death a frew days prior a special episode of Wahlgrens värld was aired, dedicated to Hans Wahlgren showing his best scenes from all seasonsof the series.

== Personal life ==
Wahlgren was the only child of actors Ivar Wahlgren and Nina Scenna. From 1962, he was married to actress Christina Schollin; together they had four children: banker Peter Wahlgren, actor Niclas Wahlgren, singer Pernilla Wahlgren, and actor Linus Wahlgren. Wahlgren was of Italian descent on his mother's side.

Wahlgren died in Norra Lagnö on 10 May 2024, at the age of 86.

== Filmography ==
- 1945: Indianer och blekansikten (English: Indians and palefaces)
- 1959: Raggare!
- 1960: Goda vänner trogna grannar
- 1963: Det är hos mig han har varit
- 1963: Protest
- 1963: Fan ger ett anbud (TV series)
- 1964: Henrik IV
- 1965: En historia till fredag (TV series)
- 1968: Vindingevals
- 1968: Freddy klarar biffen
- 1969: Eva – den utstötta
- 1969: Régi nyár (English: Summer of Old Times), Baron Miklós Pataky (TV)
- 1970: Skräcken har 1000 ögon
- 1981: Olsson per sekund eller Det finns ingen anledning till oro (TV)
- 1983: Spanska flugan (TV series)
- 1991: Villfarelser (TV series)
- 1991: Tillbaka till framtiden (TV series; voice)
- 1992: Rederiet (TV series)
- 1993: Swat Kats (TV series; voice)
- 1994: Spindelmannen (TV series; voice)
- 1994: Montana Jones (TV series; voice)
- 1995: Landet för länge sedan III: Jakten på det försvunna vattnet (voice)
- 1996: Landet för länge sedan IV: Färden till Dimmornas Land (voice)
- 1997: Landet för länge sedan V: Den mystiska ön (voice)
- 1998: Dr. Dolittle (voice)
- 1998: Babe: en gris kommer till stan (voice)
- 1998: Landet för länge sedan VI: Hemligheten bakom Saurus-Berget (voice)
- 1999: Toy Story 2 (voice)
- 1999: Pokémon – Filmen (voice)
- 1999: Kurage, den hariga hunden (TV series; voice)
- 2000: Pokémon 2 – Ensam är stark (voice as Professor Oak)
- 2000: Landet för länge sedan VII: Jakten på Himlastenen (voice)
- 2001: Landet för länge sedan VIII: När isen kom (voice)
- 2005: Nanny McPhee (voice)
- 2005: Charlie and the Chocolate Factory (voice)
