= Let Your Spirit Fly =

Single by Jan Johansen & Pernilla Wahlgren
- Released: 2003
- Genre: Pop
- Label: M&L
- Songwriter(s): Anders Dannvik; Ola Höglund

"Let Your Spirit Fly" is a song performed by Jan Johansen and Pernilla Wahlgren in Sweden's preselection for the Eurovision Song Contest, Melodifestivalen 2003. The song finished in second place.

The song was later covered by Ragni Malmsten and Philipp Kirkorov.

== Charts ==
| Chart (2003) | Peak position |
|---|---|
| Sweden | 10 |
