= Flashback (Pernilla Wahlgren album) =

1989 studio album by Pernilla Wahlgren

Studio album by Pernilla Wahlgren
- Released: 1989
- Studio: Soundtrade (Solna)
- Genre: Pop
- Label: Sonet
- Producer: Emilio Ingrosso

Pernilla Wahlgren chronology
Pure Dynamite (1987)	Flashback (1989)	I Myself and Me (1992)

Singles from Flashback
- 1. "Mardröm" Released: 1989; 2. "Flashback" Released: 1989

Flashback is the fourth studio album by Swedish singer Pernilla Wahlgren, released in 1989, by Sonet Records.

== Track listing ==
Side A
No.	Title	Writer(s)	Length
1.	"Flashback"	Roy Colegate	3:50
2.	"Stop That Thing"	Gordon Cyrus; Pernilla Wahlgren; Colegate	3:38
3.	"Take It Away"	Cyrus	3:22
4.	"Mardröm"	Cyrus	3:34
5.	"I'll Be Your Lady"	Colegate	3:01
Total length:			17:25

Side B
No.	Title	Writer(s)	Length
1.	"Kom och ta mig"	Cyrus	3:15
2.	"Sad Boy"	Colegate	3:42
3.	"Talk To Me"	Wahlgren	4:31
4.	"Lucky Star"	Colegate	3:42
5.	"(This Is Our) Last Chance"	Colegate	4:02
Total length:			19:12

== Charts ==
Weekly chart performance for Flashback
Chart (1989)	Peak position
Swedish Albums (Sverigetopplistan)	47
