= Fame (duo) =

Swedish musical duo

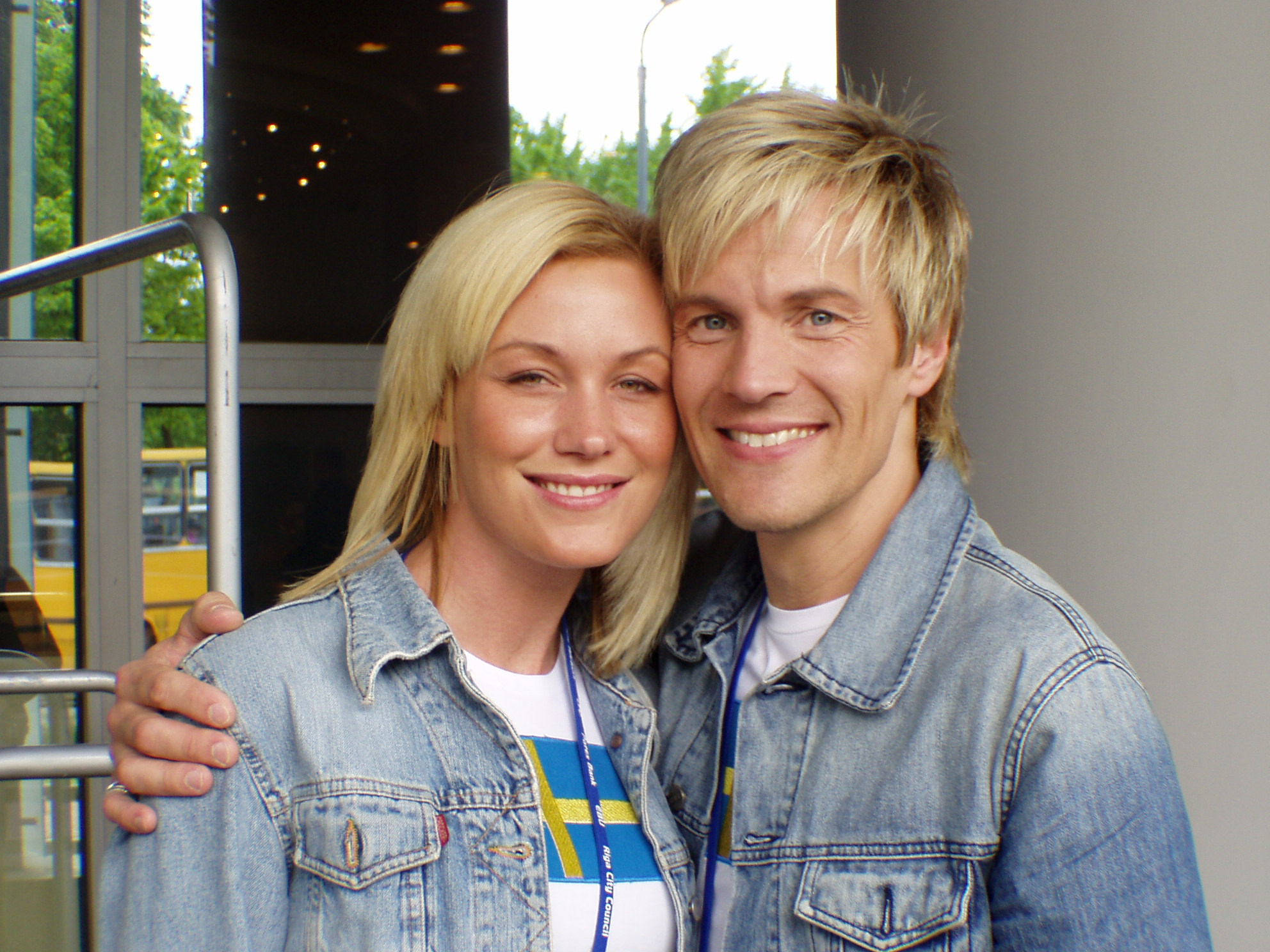
- Andersson and Bäcklund in 2003

Background information
- Origin: Sweden
- Genres: Pop; Schlager
- Years active: 2002–2006
- Members: Jessica Andersson; Magnus Bäcklund

Fame was a Swedish musical duo consisting of Jessica Andersson (born 27 October 1973 in Stockholm) and Magnus Bäcklund (born 16 November 1965 in Kristinehamn, Värmland County). They met each other at the televised arts school and contest Fame Factory, which aired in autumn 2002. Bäcklund was the overall winner, while Andersson dropped out to give birth to her son Liam. Bäcklund also has two young twin daughters at home. Andersson is a former photo model and Bäcklund is a commercial pilot.

== Melodifestivalen ==
In 2003, Fame won the favour of the Swedish public and the jury with the song "Give Me Your Love" in a landslide victory in Melodifestivalen 2003 at the Stockholm Globe Arena. Fame won with 240 points, overtaking such former Melodifestivalen winners as Jan Johansen, Jill Johnson and Afro-Dite, as well as the famous Swedish pop group Alcazar. They went on to participate in the Eurovision Song Contest, eventually garnering 107 points, which put them in fifth place.

In 2004, they participated in Melodifestivalen again and reached sixth place with the song "Vindarna vänder oss" ("The Winds Turn Us").

== After break up ==
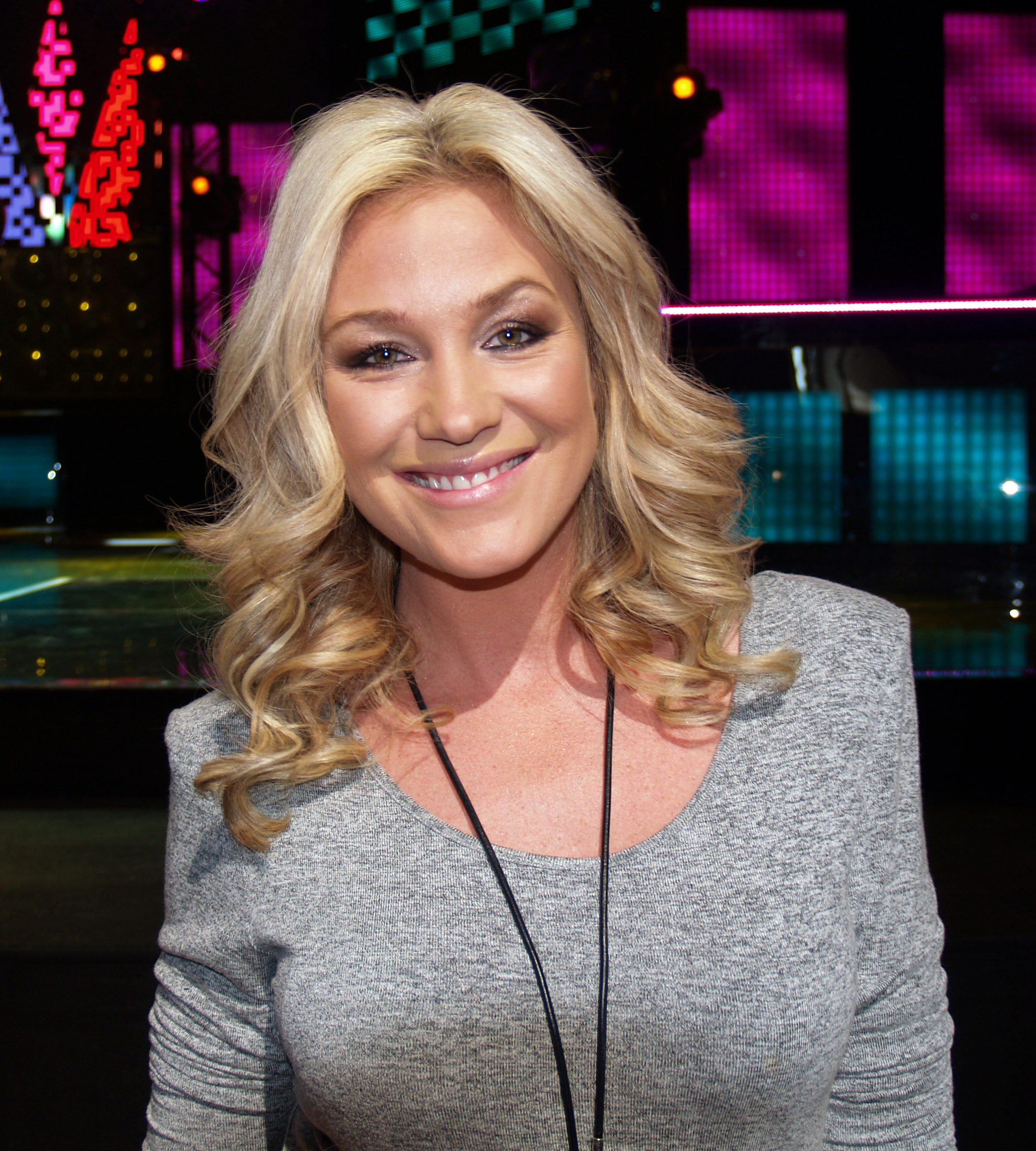
Jessica Andersson at Melodifestivalen 2010.

- Magnus Bäcklund

Magnus Bäcklund went on to take part in Melodifestivalen 2006 with the song "The Name of Love". He took part in the first semifinal and made it to the Andra Chansen (second chance) round. From there he reached the final, where he finished 5th. Jessica Andersson also entered with the song "Kalla nätter" ("Cold Nights"), but came in fifth in her semifinal round, which eliminated her from the competition.

- Jessica Andersson

Jessica Andersson took part in Melodifestivalen six times with "Kalla nätter" in 2006, "Kom" in 2007, "I Did It for Love" in 2010, "Can't Hurt Me Now" in 2015, "Party Voice" in 2018 and "Horizon" in 2021, but without winning the competition. She also released two solo albums: Wake Up in 2009 and 40.14.4 in 2013.

== Discography ==
=== Albums ===
Year	Album	Peak positions
Year	Album	SWE
2003	Give Me Your Love	11

=== Singles ===
Year	Single	Peak positions	Album
Year	Single	SWE	Album
2003	"Give Me Your Love"	1	Give Me Your Love
2003	"Pop Into My Heart"	53	Give Me Your Love
2004	"Vindarna vänder oss"	23	
2005	"Gjorda för varann"	47	
2005	"All in the Game"	54	
2025	"Survivors"		

Preceded by Afro-dite with "Never Let It Go"	Sweden in the Eurovision Song Contest; 2003	Succeeded by Lena Philipsson with "Det gör ont"
