= Pernilla Wahlgren =

Swedish singer and actress (born 1967)

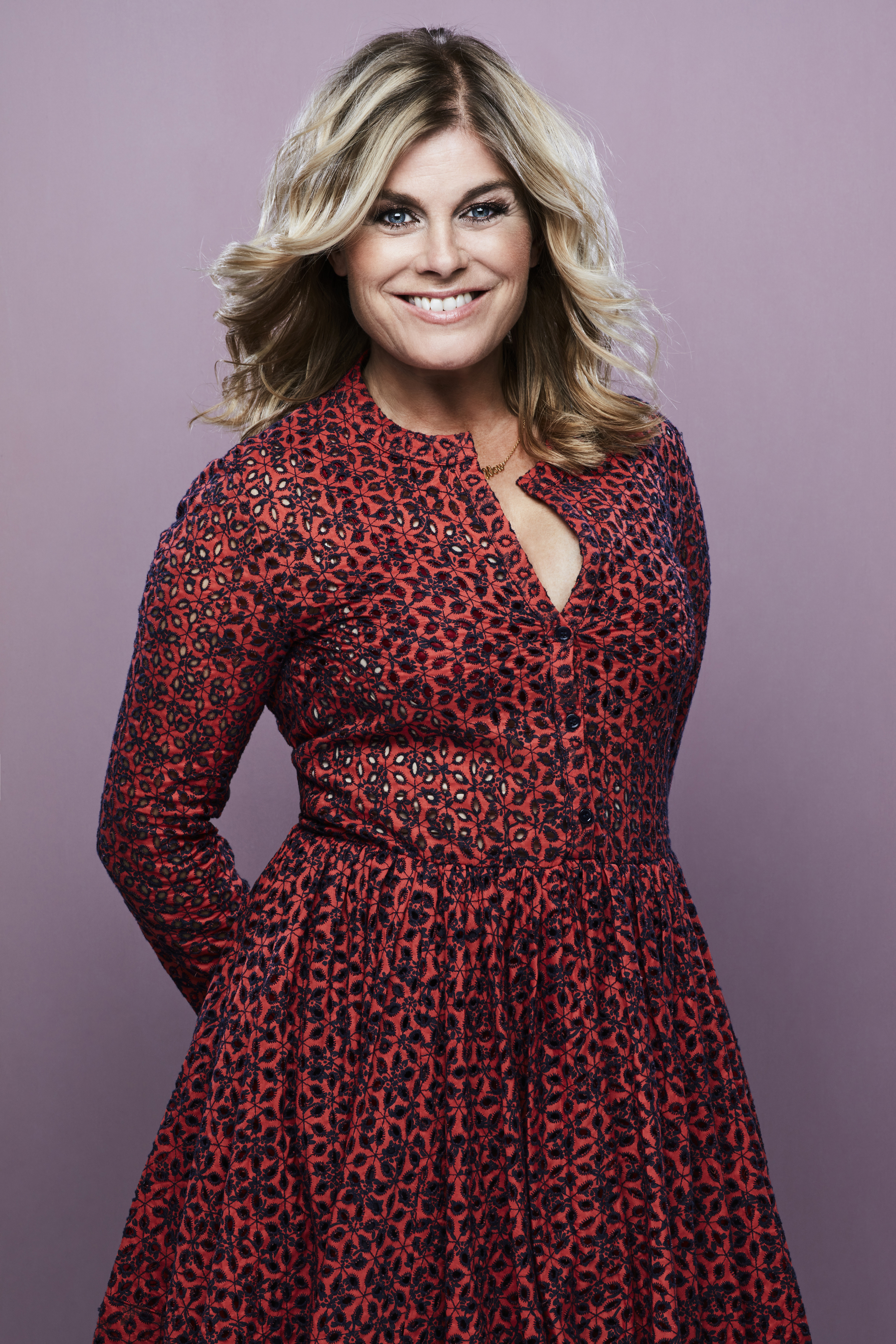
- Wahlgren in 2016
- Born: Pernilla Nina Elisabet Wahlgren; 24 December 1967 (age 58); Värmdö, Sweden
- Occupations: Singer; actress
- Years active: 1985–present
- Spouse: Emilio Ingrosso (m. 1993; div. 2002) Christian Bauer (m. 2023)
- Partner: Joachim Lennholm (2002–2008)
- Children: 4, including Oliver, Bianca and Benjamin
- Parent(s): Hans Wahlgren (father); Christina Schollin (mother)
- Relatives: Linus Wahlgren (brother)
- Musical career
- Genres: Pop; Schlager
- Instruments: Vocals
- Website: pernillawahlgren.se

Pernilla Nina Elisabet Wahlgren (Swedish pronunciation: [pæˈɳɪ̂lːa ˈvɑ̂ːlɡreːn]; born 24 December 1967) is a Swedish singer and actress. She has sung in Melodifestivalen several times; her 1985 entry titled "Piccadilly Circus" became popular and successful. She has acted in several plays and films, playing roles including Esmeralda in the Academy Award-winning Fanny and Alexander. She has twice received the Guldmasken award for her work in theater.

== Career ==
=== Acting ===
Wahlgren's first acting job, at the age of four, was alongside her mother in the television play Den längsta dagen (The Longest Day). She attended Adolf Fredrik's Music School and was also part of the Saltsjöbaden theater. After playing a small role in Lilla prinsen (The Little Prince) at Saltsjöbaden's theater, and in the face of stiff competition, Wahlgren got the title role in the musical Annie at Folkan, Stockholm. She then played Esmeralda in Ingmar Bergman's film Fanny and Alexander.

In 1982, she joined the cast of the Swedish production of The Sound of Music, in which she played Louise. At Folkan, she also had parts in Karlsson på taket (Karlsson-on-the-Roof), Mio, min Mio (Mio in the Land of Faraway), Snövit (Snow White) and Ringens hemlighet (The Secret of the Ring). Wahlgren played Annika in the musical version of Pippi Longstocking at Folket in Stockholm; for the two final performances she replaced Siw Malmkvist in the role of Pippi, for which she received positive reviews. In her youth and as an adult Wahlgren portrayed Pippi Longstocking several times. Wahlgren appeared in an episode of Nygammalt in 1983 and an episode of Razzel in October 1984, where she performed her debut single, "Nu har det tänt". She has also appeared in film and television productions including Bo Widerberg's 1986 production of Ormens väg på hälleberget (The Serpent's Way) and Snoken in 1995.

Wahlgren has appeared in theatrical comedies in Stockholm, including Parneviks cirkusparty (Parnevik's Circus Party), Spanska flugan (Spanish Fly) and Bubbel trubbel (Bubble Trouble). She has twice been nominated for the Guldmasken theater award; first for her role in Charleys tant (Charley's Aunt) at the Intiman Theater, and then for her part in Kärlek & lavemang (Love and Enemy) at Fredriksdalsteatern in Helsingborg. She has also appeared in musical roles in Annie Get Your Gun, Grease, The Wizard of Oz, Cats and Nils Karlsson Pyssling. On 29 September 2007, The Sound of Music premièred at the Göta Lejon theater in Stockholm, where Wahlgren played in a cast that included Tommy Nilsson. In 2013, she had a role in the musical Priscilla, Queen of the Desert at Göta Lejon.

Between 2018 and 2019, Wahlgren acted in her own stage show celebrating 40-years as a singer and actress, called Kort, glad och tacksam (Short, Happy and Grateful). Her second stage show, a continuation of Kort, glad och tacksam, called Pernilla Wahlgren har Hybris (Pernilla Wahlgren Got Hubris), written and directed by Edward af Sillén, premiered in 2020.

=== Music ===
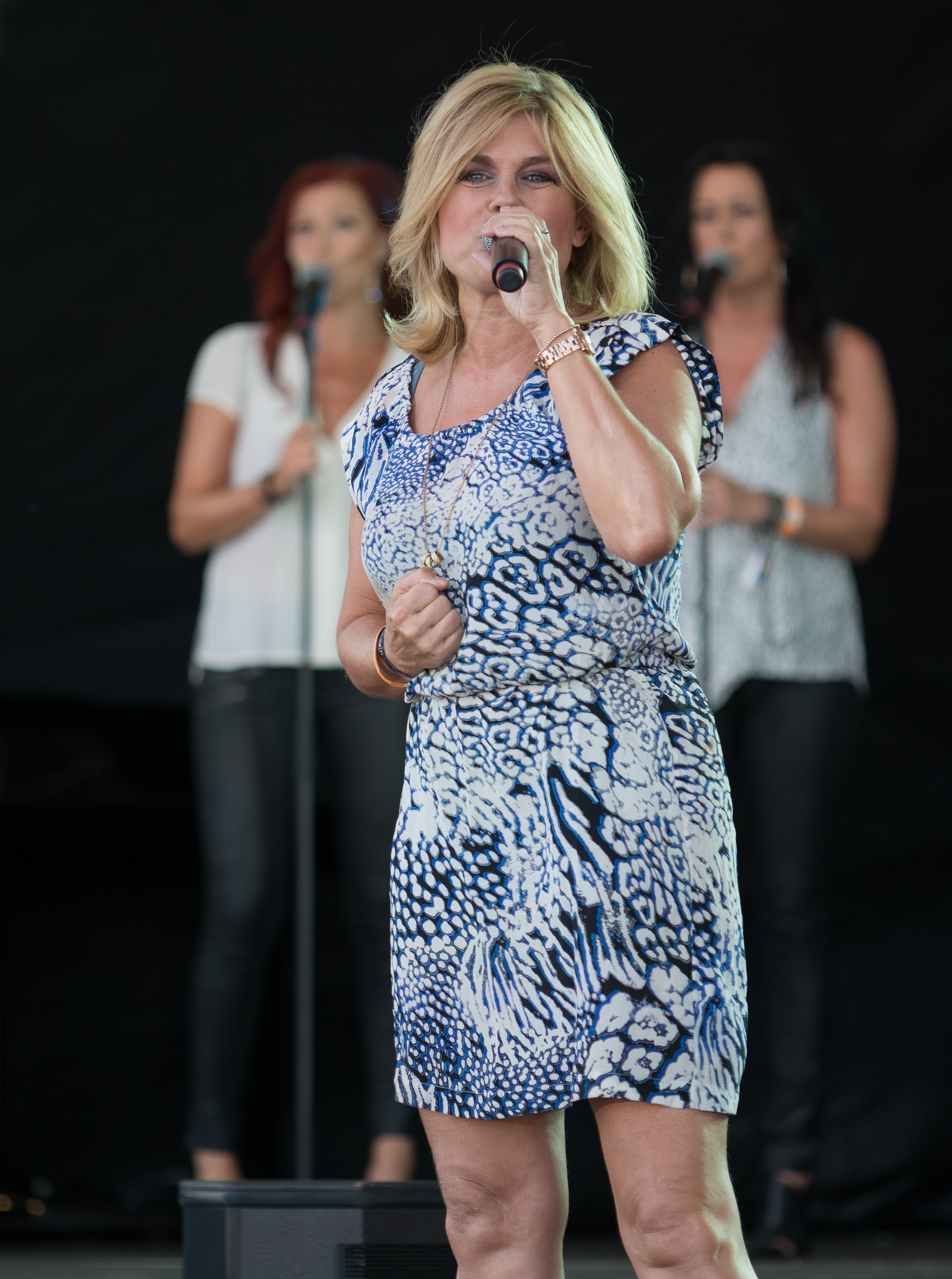
Wahlgren performing at Stockholm Pride in 2014

In the mid-to-late 1980s, Wahlgren developed a pop music career, touring several times and releasing studio albums. Her songs include: "Svindlande affärer", "I Need Your Love", "Every Time When We're Together" and "Running for Cover". In August 2006, she released the album Beautiful Day; the debut single from the album, "Talking to an Angel", was certified gold and the track "Come Inside My World" became the theme to TV4's entertainment program Förkväll.

==== Melodifestivalen ====
Wahlgren's musical breakthrough came when she participated in Melodifestivalen 1985. Her song "Piccadilly Circus" became a public favorite, but she was placed fourth in the competition. Wahlgren participated in Melodifestivalen 1991 with the song "Tvillingsjäl", which did not make it to the second round of voting. In 2003, she again took part in Melodifestivalen, this time with Jan Johansen; they achieved second place with the song "Let Your Spirit Fly". In 2010, Wahlgren again participated in Melodifestivalen, with the song "Jag vill om du vågar". Her 2013 entry was with Jenny Silver and Hanna Hedlund as part of the band Swedish House Wives performing the song "On Top of the World".

=== Television ===
Wahlgren has been a television presenter for several shows, including Scenen är din, Söndagsöppet (both on SVT), Småstjärnorna and Baby Boom (both on TV4). She and her brother Niclas also presented the children's show Nicke & Nilla on TV4. Wahlgren had a role in the 1995 series Snoken on SVT. She also dubbed several children's films, such as The Lego Movie (as the voice for Princess Unikitty), and voiced Misty, Melody and Delia Ketchum in several Pokémon films. From 2016, she has participated in the reality series Wahlgrens värld (Wahlgren's World) which is broadcast on Kanal 5 and the streaming service MAX which documents her life and her extended family's lives. The series was continued with a third and fourth season in 2018; a fifth and sixth season were broadcast in 2019. In 2019, Wahlgren had a leading role as Santa's wife in Sveriges Television's Christmas calendar, Panik i tomteverkstan, opposite Per Andersson. Since 2021, she has been participating in Masked Singer Sverige. In 2023, Pernilla Wahlgren started presenting the SVT show Allsång på Skansen, replacing Sanna Nielsen.

== Personal life ==
Wahlgren was born to actors Christina Schollin and Hans Wahlgren on Christmas Eve, and grew up in Norra Lagnö. She has three brothers: actor and singer Niclas, actor Linus, and broker and firefighter Peter. She was married to dancer and composer Emilio Ingrosso from 1993 to 2002; they have three children—Oliver Ingrosso (born 1989), a DJ, music producer and actor; Bianca Ingrosso (born 1994), a blogger and singer; and Benjamin Ingrosso (born 1997), a singer, artist and songwriter. Pernilla also has a son, Theo (born 2007), with Joachim Lennholm. In an episode of Vem tror du att du är? (Who do you think You Are?) broadcast on SVT in 2011 it was revealed to Wahlgren that she was of Italian descent on her father's side of the family. Since 2021, Wahlgren has been in a relationship with Christian Bauer. Wahlgren and Bauer married on 7 December 2023 in Lidingö.

== Discography ==
=== Studio albums ===
Source: Pernilla Wahlgren discography at Discogs

- Pernilla Wahlgren (album) (1985)
- Attractive (1986)
- Pure Dynamite (1987)
- Flashback (1989)
- I Myself and Me (1992)
- Flashback Number Four (1995) (Best of)
- Pernilla Wahlgren (1995) (Re-issue)
- Beautiful Day (2006)
- Holiday with You (2012)

=== Singles ===
Title	Year	Peak chart positions	Album
Title	Year	SWE	Album
"Piccadilly Circus"	1985	5	Pernilla Wahlgren
"Svindlande affärer"	1985	20	Pernilla Wahlgren
"Love on You"	1986	8	Attractive
"Paradise (feat. Emilio Ingrosso)"	1986	6	Attractive
"I Need Your Love"	1987	4	Pure Dynamite
"Running for Cover"	1988	11	Pure Dynamite
"Mardröm"	1989	16	Flashback
"C'est Démon!"	1992	7	I Myself and Me

Preceded by (Sweden) Carola	OGAE Second Chance Contest winner 1991	Succeeded by (Norway) Wenche Myhre
