= Holiday with You =

Studio album by Pernilla Wahlgren
- Released: 2012
- Genre: Christmas
- Length: 58:00
- Label: Freestar
- Producer: Magnus Carlsson

Pernilla Wahlgren chronology
Beautiful Day (2006)	Holiday with You (2012)

Holiday with You is a 2012 Christmas album by Swedish singer Pernilla Wahlgren.

== Track listing ==
No.	Title	Writer(s)	Length
1.	"Holiday With You"	Maguns Carlsson	3:43
2.	"Have Yourself A Merry Little Christmas"	Ralph Blane, Hugh Martin	4:13
3.	"Jul, Jul, Strålande Jul"	Edvard Evers, Gustaf Nordqvist	3:00
4.	"Baby, It's Cold Outside" (feat. Gunhild Carling, Christer Sjögren)	Frank Loesser	3:33
5.	"Jingeling Tingeling"	Leroy Anderson, Mitchell Parish, Beppe Wolgers	2:57
6.	"No More Blue Chrismases"	Gerry Goffin, Michael Masser	4:11
7.	"Winter Wonderland"	Felix Bernard, Dick Smith	2:28
8.	"Christmastime Is Here Again" (feat. Roger Pontare)	Roy Colgate, Emilio Ingrosso, Pernilla Wahlgren	3:51
9.	"När Det Lider Mot Jul"	Ruben Liljefors, Jeanna Oterdahl	2:12
10.	"Christmas On The Dancefloor" (feat. Afro-Dite, Cotton Club, Richard Häger, Jan Johansen, Charlotte Perrelli)	Figge Boström, Richard Häger, Johan Lindman	3:59
11.	"The Christmas Song"	Mel Tormé, Bob Wells	4:00
12.	"Jag Såg Mamma Kyssa Tomten" (feat. Benjamin Wahlgren)	Tommie Connor, Ninita	3:18
13.	"Holiday With You (Single Version)"	Carlsson	3:45
14.	"Juletidens Timma"	Ralph Blane, Hugh Martin, Marie Nilsson	4:13
15.	"Wonderful Peace"	Norman Luboff, Nordqvist	3:00
16.	"Christmastime Is Here Again (12” Version)" (feat. Roger Pontare)	Colegate, Ingrosso, Wahlgren	5:06
