= Let's Dance 2021 =

Season of television series

- Season 2021
- Celebrity winner: Filip Lamprecht
- Professional winner: Linn Hegdal

Release
- Original network: TV4
- Original release: 20 March – 15 May 2021

Season chronology
- ← Previous; Let's Dance 2020 Next → Let's Dance 2022

Let's Dance 2021 was the sixteenth season of the Swedish celebrity dancing show Let's Dance. The season premiered on 20 March 2021 and ended on 15 May 2021, and broadcast on TV4. New presenters for this season were Petra Mede and David Lindgren.

== Contestants ==
Singer Carola Häggkvist was the first celebrity contestant to be announced on 18 February. On 27 April, Häggkvist decided to quit the show, citing health concerns as a reason. On 28 April, TV4 announced that Keyyo who was eliminated on 24 April, would return to replace Häggkvist.

Celebrity	Occupation	Professional partner	Status
Janne Josefsson	Investigative journalist	Malin Watson	Eliminated 1st on 27 March 2021
Martin Melin	Author and television personality	Maria Zimmerman	Eliminated 2nd on 3 April 2021
Suzanne Axell	Journalist and television presenter	Tobias Bader	Eliminated 3rd on 10 April 2021
Hanna Hedlund	Singer	Tobias Wallin	Eliminated 4th on 17 April 2021
Carola Häggkvist	Singer	Tobias Karlsson	Withdrew on 27 April 2021
Michel Tornéus	Long jumper	Jasmine Takács	Eliminated 6th on 1 May 2021
Keyyo	Comedienne and television presenter	Hugo Gustafsson	Eliminated 5th on 24 April 2021; Third place on 8 May 2021
Anis Don Demina	DJ & Singer	Katja Luján Engalholm	Runner-up on 15 May 2021
Filip Lamprecht	Fashion model and Kristin Kaspersen's son	Linn Hegdal	Winner on 15 May 2021

== Scoring chart ==
Couple	Place	1	2	1+2	3	4	5	6	7	8	9
Filip & Linn	1	16	19	35	20	17	23+10=33	29+8=37	22+29=51	30+40=70	30+28+30=88
Anis & Katja	2	10	19	29	19	27	30+2=32	30+6=36	30+28=58	29+37=66	30+28+30=88
Keyyo & Hugo	3	12	14	26	21	25	26+12=38	23+2=25	22+29=51	30+37=67	
Michel & Jasmine	4	13	15	28	15	20	29+4=33	28+10=38	25+26=51		
Carola & Tobias K.	5	16	15	31	19	24	27+6=33	30+4=34			
Hanna & Tobias W.	6	12	16	28	19	23	30+8=38				
Suzanne & Tobias B.	7	6	6	12	13	11					
Martin & Maria	8	5	8	13	11						
Janne & Malin	9	7	9	16							

Red numbers indicate the lowest score of each week.
Green numbers indicate the highest score of each week.
indicates the couple that was eliminated that week.
indicates the couple received the lowest score of the week and was eliminated.
indicates the couple withdrew from the competition.
indicates the couple returned to the competition after previously being eliminated.
indicates the couple finished in the bottom two.
indicates the couple earned immunity from elimination.
indicates the winning couple.
indicates the runner-up couple.
indicates the third place couple.

=== Average chart ===
Rank by average	Place	Couple	Total points	Number of dances	Total average
1	2	Anis & Katja	337	13	25.9
2	1	Filip & Linn	323	13	24.8
3	3	Keyyo & Hugo	230	10	23.0
4	5	Carola & Tobias K.	131	6	21.8
5	4	Michel & Jasmine	171	8	21.4
6	6	Hanna & Tobias W.	100	5	20.0
7	7	Suzanne & Tobias B.	36	4	9.0
8	9	Janne & Malin	16	2	8.0
8	8	Martin & Maria	24	3	8.0
