= Alice Stenlöf =

Swedish media personality

Alice Ingrid Stenlöf (born 17 June 1996) is a Swedish television personality and blogger. She hosted the podcast Alice & Bianca – har du sagt A får du säga B together with Bianca Ingrosso.

== Biography ==
Stenlöf was born in Gothenburg. Since 2015, Stenlöf has been blogging about fashion, beauty and her everyday life. In November 2017, Stenlöf got to know and befriend Bianca Ingrosso, and they started the podcast Alice & Bianca – har du sagt A får du säga B. During the award show Guldtuben in 2018 she was nominated in the categories "Blog of the Year". and "New star of the Year", she won in the category "Podcast of the Year" along with Ingrosso.

In May 2019, Stenlöf and Ingrosso did a showcast in Globen in front of a live audience, the showcast was later broadcast on Kanal 5. In August of the same year Stenlöf and Ingrosso announced that they would not continue on with the podcast.

On 25 February, Stenlöf announced that she would be a celebrity dancer in Let's Dance 2020 which was broadcast on TV4.
