= I Myself and Me =

Studio album by Pernilla Wahlgren
- Released: 1993
- Genre: Pop

Pernilla Wahlgren chronology
Flashback (1989)	I Myself and Me (1993)	Flashback Number four (1995)

I Myself and Me is a 1992 studio album released by Swedish singer Pernilla Wahlgren. "C'est Demon!", "Fallen Angel", "All of Me" and "Are You Ready" were released as singles.

== Track listing ==
1. Starshine
2. C'est démon!
3. Give a Little Love (Norell Oson Bard)
4. Fallen Angel (A. Wollbeck, Alexander Bard, El-Hag)
5. We Could Make It Happen (E. Ingrosso, A. Wollbeck, Alexander Bard)
6. Are You Ready (Norell Oson Bard)
7. Rise
8. I Myself and Me (A. Wollbeck, Alexander Bard, Jean-Pierre Barda)
9. Love of Jealousy
10. When
11. No. 1 Priority (D. Carr)
12. All of Me
