= Wake Up (Jessica Andersson album) =

Studio album by Jessica Andersson
- Released: 11 November 2009
- Studio: Polar Studios, Folkungastudion, Studio Stugan
- Genre: pop music
- Length: 31:38
- Label: WEA Records
- Producer: Stefan Brunzell; Max Linder

Jessica Andersson chronology
| Wake Up (2009) | 40.14.4 (2013) |

Wake Up is the debut studio album by Swedish singer Jessica Andersson. The album was released in November 2009 and peaked at number 10 on the Swedish Albums Chart.

== Track listing ==
Standard edition
| No. | Title | Writer(s) | Length |
|---|---|---|---|
| 1. | "Wake Up" | Stefan Andersson, Stefan Brunzell | 3:03 |
| 2. | "I Will Follow Him" | Franck Pourcel, Jacques Plante, Paul Mauriat, Norman Gimbel | 2:40 |
| 3. | "I'll Save the Last Dance for You" | Doc Pomus, Mort Shuman | 2:48 |
| 4. | "Running Scared" | Joe Melson, Roy Orbison | 2:39 |
| 5. | "I Only Wanna Be With You" | Ivor Raymonde, Mike Hawker | 3:28 |
| 6. | "Tell Him" | Bert Russell | 2:51 |
| 7. | "You Don't Have to Say You Love Me" | Vicki Wickham, Simon Napier-Bell, Pino Donaggio, Vito Pallavicini | 2:32 |
| 8. | "I've Told Every Little Star" | Oscar Hammerstein, Jerome Kern | 2:27 |
| 9. | "Long Live Love" | Chris Andrews | 2:48 |
| 10. | "The End of the World" | Arthur Kent, Sylvia Dee | 2:44 |
| 11. | "Here You Come Again" (bonus track) | Barry Mann, Cynthia Weil | 3:39 |

== Charts ==
| Chart (2009/10) | Peak position |
|---|---|
| Swedish Albums (Sverigetopplistan) | 10 |

== Release history ==
| Region | Release date | Format | Label | Catalogue |
|---|---|---|---|---|
| Europe | 11 November 2009 | Compact Disc | WEA Records | 5051865657552 |
