= Wahlgrens värld =

Swedish reality series

- Also known as: Wahlgren's World
- Genre: Reality
- Starring: Pernilla Wahlgren; Bianca Ingrosso; Benjamin Ingrosso; Hans Wahlgren; Christina Schollin; Oliver Ingrosso; Linus Wahlgren; Theodor Wahlgren; Jessica Wahlgren
- Opening theme: Come Inside My World
- Ending theme: Come Inside My World
- Country of origin: Sweden
- Original language: Swedish
- No. of seasons: 17
- No. of episodes: 142 (season 10)

Production
- Executive producer: Susanne Söderberg
- Producer: Johan Pråmell
- Production locations: Principally Lidingö and Östermalm
- Running time: 42 minutes

Original release
- Network: Kanal 5
- Release: 6 October 2016

Wahlgrens värld (in English: "Wahlgren's World") is a Swedish reality series following the daily lives of actress and singer Pernilla Wahlgren and her daughter, Bianca Ingrosso, alongside their other family members. The show was first broadcast on 6 October 2016, and has so far been broadcast for ten seasons on Kanal 5 and the streaming service MAX.

== Premise ==
The show follows Pernilla Wahlgren and her family in their daily lives. These include her children, Oliver, Bianca, Benjamin, and Theo; her parents, Hans and Christina; her brother Linus, and his ex-wife, Jessica.

The series is primarily shot in Lidingö, where Pernilla lives, and Stockholm, where her daughter Bianca lives. Other locations that have featured in the show include Gothenburg, Marbella, Italy, Israel, Palma de Mallorca, and Los Angeles.

== Episodes ==
Series	Episodes	Originally released	
Series	Episodes	First released	Last released
1	11	6 October 2016	15 December 2016
2	15	7 September 2017	14 December 2017
3	12	15 February 2018	3 May 2018
4	15	23 August 2018	29 November 2018
5	13	17 January 2019	11 April 2019
6	17	22 August 2019	12 December 2019
7	17	16 January 2020	21 May 2020
8	15	10 August 2020	19 November 2020
9	12	28 January 2021	8 April 04
10	15	2 September 2021	9 December 2021
11	TBC	24 February 2022	TBC
