= Let's Dance 2020 =

Season of television series

- Season 2020
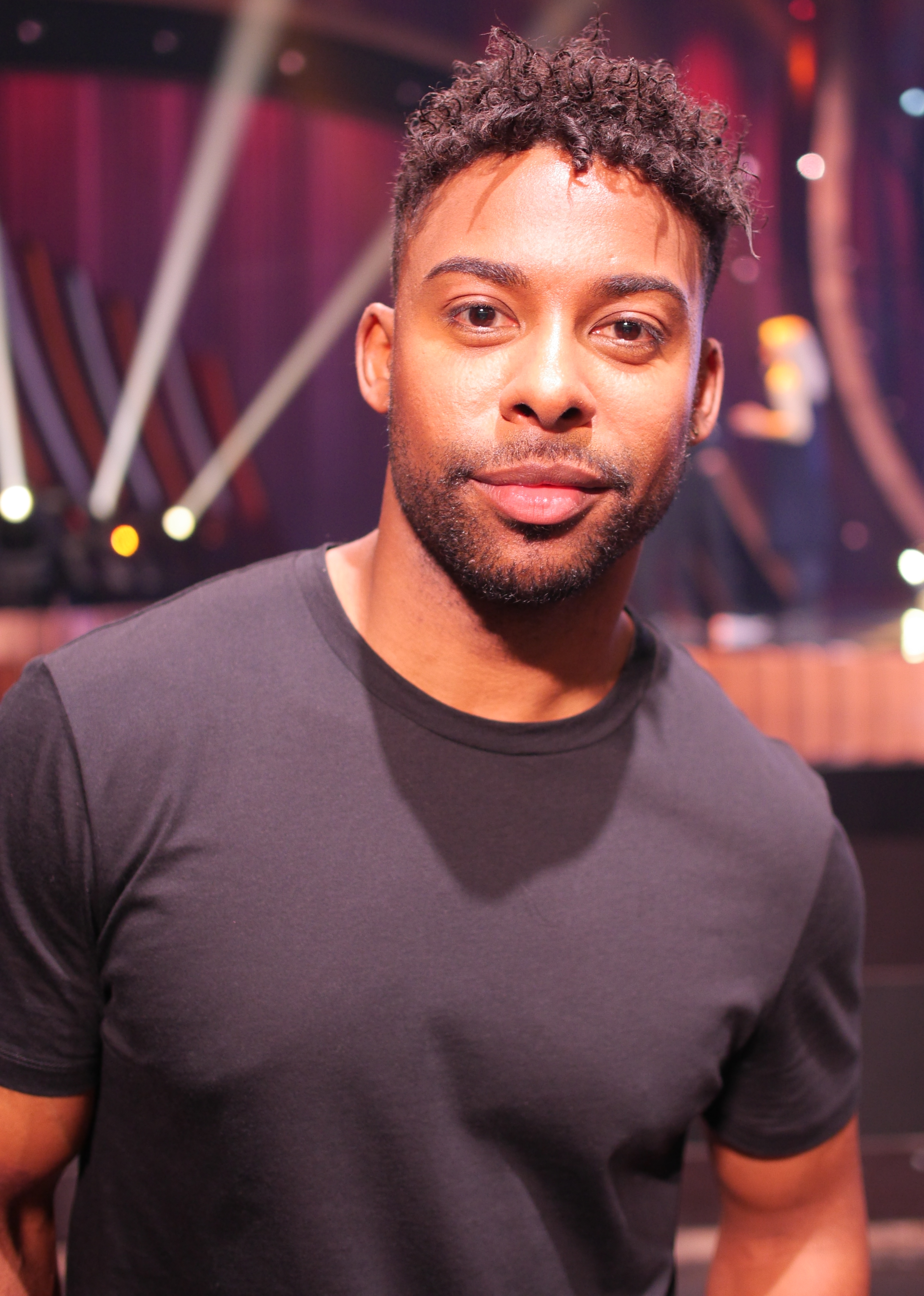
- Celebrity winner: John Lundvik
- Professional winner: Linn Hegdal
- No. of episodes: 16

Release
- Original network: TV4
- Original release: 20 March – 29 May 2020

Season chronology
- ← Previous; Let's Dance 2019 Next → Let's Dance 2021

Let's Dance 2020 is the fifteenth season of the Swedish celebrity dancing show Let's Dance. The season premiered on 20 March 2020, and was broadcast on TV4.

Due to the outbreak of the coronavirus pandemic in Sweden, TV4 decided that a number of the season's episodes would be filmed without an audience. On 17 March, TV4 announced that because of restrictions as a result of the pandemic, actress Siw Malmkvist would not be participating in this season. Because celebrity dancer Anders Jansson was suffering from a cold, the second episode of the show was cancelled; the show featured live performances from several Swedish singers instead. During the second episode, Dr. Mikael Sandström revealed he would not continue dancing this season. He said he wanted to focus instead on his duties as a doctor during the pandemic. Because of the ongoing illnesses of one dancer and several crew members, the show paused for two weeks, but returned on 17 April. Restrictions meant that Anders Jansson could not take part in the 17 April episode. On 20 April, Jansson announced that he was pulling out of the show because of his illness.

== Contestants ==
Swedish politician Jan Björklund was announced as the season's first celebrity in February 2020.

Celebrity	Occupation	Professional partner	Status
Mikael "Soldoktorn" Sandström	TV Doctor	Malin Watson	Withdrew on 27 March 2020
Bathina Philipson	Actress	Marc Christensen	Eliminated 1st on 17 April 2020
Anders Jansson	Comedian	Jasmine Takács	Withdrew on 20 April 2020
Andreas Lundstedt	Singer	Tobias Bader	Eliminated 2nd on 24 April 2020
Alice Stenlöf	Television personality and blogger	Hugo Gustafsson	Eliminated 3rd on 1 May 2020
Penny Parnevik	Blogger and Reality TV star	Jacob Persson	Eliminated 4th on 8 May 2020
Jan Björklund	Politician	Cecilia Ehrling	Eliminated 5th on 15 May 2020
Anders Svensson	Footballer	Maria Zimmerman	Third place on 22 May 2020
Sussie Eriksson	Singer and actress	Calle Sterner	Runner-up on 29 May 2020
John Lundvik	Singer and athlete	Linn Hegdal	Winner on 29 May 2020

== Scoring chart ==
Couple	Place	1	2	1+2	3	4	5	6	7	8
John & Linn	1	8	17	25	26	27+0=27	35+12=47	30+27=57	28+30=58	30+29+30=89
Sussie & Calle	2	14	22	36	22	21+4=25	40+10=50	29+30=59	28+30=58	30+30+30=90
Anders S. & Maria	3	11	9	20	17	21+4=25	24+6=30	22+26=48	27+29=56	
Jan & Cecilia	4	13	13	26	19	18+0=18	30+4=34	25+27=52		
Penny & Jacob	5	10	16	26	20	24+0=24	26+8=34			
Alice & Hugo	6	16	10	26	16	19+4=23				
Andreas & Tobias	7	14	24	38	17					
Anders J. & Jasmine	8	8	–	–	–					
Bathina & Marc	9	11	13	24						
Mikael & Malin	10	8	–							

Red numbers indicate the lowest score of each week.
Green numbers indicate the highest score of each week.
indicates the couple that was eliminated that week.
indicates the couple received the lowest score of the week and was eliminated.
indicates the couple withdrew from the competition.
indicates the couple finished in the bottom two.
indicates the couple earned immunity from elimination.
indicates the winning couple.
indicates the runner-up couple.
indicates the third place couple.

=== Average chart ===
Rank by average	Place	Couple	Total points	Number of dances	Total average
1	2	Sussie & Calle	316	12	26.3
2	1	John & Linn	308	12	25.7
3	3	Anders S. & Maria	180	9	20.0
4	4	Jan & Cecilia	138	7	19.7
5	7	Andreas & Tobias	55	3	18.3
6	5	Penny & Jacob	90	5	18.0
7	6	Alice & Hugo	61	4	15.3
8	9	Bathina & Marc	24	2	12.0
9	8	Anders J. & Jasmine	8	1	8.0
9	10	Mikael & Malin	8	1	8.0
