= Småstjärnorna =

- Genre: Children's, talent show
- Presented by: Agneta Sjödin; Martin Timell; Rob'n'Raz; Pernilla Wahlgren
- Country of origin: Sweden
- Original language: Swedish

Production
- Production company: Meter Television

Original release
- Network: TV4
- Release: 16 June 1995 – 16 August 2003

Småstjärnorna was a Swedish talent show with child participants. It aired on TV4 between 16 June 1995 and 16 August 2003. The children performed songs by their favourite artists while dressing up as and impersonating them on stage.

Multiple Swedish celebrities made their debut as children as part of the show. In 1997, an eight year old Alicia Vikander appeared on the show and performed as Helen Sjöholm. Additionally, Linnea Henriksson appeared in 1995, making her stage debut.
