= Ciao Bella (film) =

- Theatrical release poster
- Directed by: Mani Masserat-Agah
- Written by: Jens Jonsson
- Produced by: Christian Holm and Mani Maserrat-Agah (co-producers) Christer Nilson, Lena Rehnberg, Olle Wirenhed (executive producers)
- Starring: Poyan Karimi; Chanelle Lindell; Oliver Wahlgren-Ingrosso
- Cinematography: Andréas Lennartsson
- Edited by: Kristin Grundström
- Music by: Martin Willert
- Distributed by: Götafilm
- Release date: August 3, 2007
- Running time: 86 minutes
- Country: Sweden
- Languages: Swedish, English, Persian, Italian

Ciao Bella is a 2007 Swedish film directed by Mani Masserat-Agah. It is the Iranian-Swedish director's first feature film.

== Synopsis ==
Gothenburg is host for an international soccer tournament called the Gothia Cup where teams from Sweden and various other countries are competing. A 16-year-old Swedish soccer player, from an immigrant family of Iranian origin, Mustafa Moradi from Lerum (played by Poyan Karimi), is yearning for love, but he is just too "nerdy" and lacks self-confidence to develop meaningful relationships and is downright intimidated by the girls who just want to have him as a "friend" but not as a lover.

Mustafa has entered with his team in the tournament where he meets a visiting team from Italy who happen to need an "extra". So he wears a #10 jersey as "Massimo" and begins practicing with them. Soon he discovers a sudden surge in his popularity by just changing his name to something Italian. Encouraged by his initial success, he tries to conceal his Iranian identity and develop an Italian persona convinced this is his chance with the girls attending the Cup games.

He is "groomed" to "become an Italian" by one of the stylish Italian players called Enrico (played by Oliver Wahlgren-Ingrosso) who gladly volunteers, but cautioning him not to fall in love with girls he goes out with. Mustafa and Enrico are clearly attracted to each other and a male bond develops between the two as Enrico's fascination for Mustafa grows.

There is a gradual transformation of Mustafa into "Massimo", his new assumed name. Sooner than he knows, he starts dating Linnea (played by Chanelle Lindell), a young but more mature Swedish woman, who longs for a genuine guy with sincerity and courage who falls for "Massimo". But she has her own baggage as she is pregnant from a previous one-stop affair in a bar and is planning on an abortion with the help of a nurse friend (played by Maria Hedborg). Disenchanted with her father (played by Jimmy Lindström) she also plans on quitting Sweden by escaping with "Massimo" to Italy at the end of the tournament as the relationship between the two blossoms into a very serious love affair.

Frustrated with his own dilemmas, and seeing the Italian players are intentionally ignoring him and do not pass the ball, Mustafa leaves the Italian soccer team in disgust. His best buddy and Italian teammate Enrico, his "partner in crime" becomes frenetic as he begs Mustafa to stay and in a moment of weakness, professes to him his love with a kiss, but Mustafa rejects him and Enrico leaves in despair.

Meanwhile, "Massimo"'s position with Linnea becomes more and more precarious and he has close calls as his acquaintances unknowingly call his bluff. But Massimo makes a pact with Linnea upon the insistence of the latter never to lie to each others, he eventually confesses and tells her the truth about his continuous lies. Eventually they reconcile and decide to continue their life together.

== Cast ==
- Poyan Karimi as Mustafa / Massimo
- Chanelle Lindell as Linnea
- Oliver Wahlgren-Ingrosso as Enrico
- Mina Azarian as Mustafa / Massimo's mother
- Jimmy Lindström as Linea's father
- Arash Bolouri as Babak
- Maria Hedborg as Nurse
- Lotta Karlge as Johanna
- Adam Lundgren as Mattias
- Oscar Rydelius as a criminal thug

== Reception ==
The film, shot on a low budget and with many of the main characters played by young novice actors, was well received by critics. It was rated 4/5 by Moviezine, VeckoRevyn and Frida and 3/5 by Svenska Dagbladet, Aftonbladet and Expressen.

The film premiered on August 3, 2007, with more than 30,000 attending in the first two weeks. The film contained some graphic sex scenes by the teenagers with demands to censor the film for certain ages.

== Awards and nominations ==
In 2009, director Mani Maserrat Agah was nominated to "New Voices/New Visions Grand Jury Prize" for Ciao Bella during the Palm Springs International Film Festival.
