= Give Me Your Love (Fame song) =

2003 song by Fame

Single by Fame

from the album Give Me Your Love
- Released: 2003
- Genre: Pop; schlager
- Length: 3:03
- Songwriters: Carl Lösnitz; Calle Kindbom

Eurovision Song Contest 2003 entry
- Country: Sweden
- Artists: Jessica Andersson; Magnus Bäcklund
- As: Fame
- Language: English
- Composers: Carl Lösnitz; Calle Kindbom
- Lyricists: Carl Lösnitz; Calle Kindbom

Finals performance
- Final result: 5th
- Final points: 107

Entry chronology
- ◄ "Never Let It Go" (2002)
- "It Hurts" (2004) ►

"Give Me Your Love" is a 2003 song written by Carl Lösnitz and Calle Kindbom and recorded by Jessica Andersson and Magnus Bäcklund as "Fame". The song won Melodifestivalen 2003 and was the Swedish entry for the Eurovision Song Contest 2003, where it placed 5th out of 26 competing entries.

== Melodifestivalen and the Eurovision Song Contest ==
"Give Me Your Love" participated in the second heat of the 2003 Melodifestivalen which was held on 22 February 2003 at the Scandinavium indoor arena in Gothenburg. The song was performed sixth of the eight competing entries and directly qualified to the contest final as one of the two songs which received the most telephone votes. On 15 March, during the final held at the Globe Arena in Stockholm, Fame were the first of the ten competing acts to perform, and "Give Me Your Love" won the contest with 240 points, receiving the highest number of votes from the regional juries and the public vote.

"Gimme Your Love" was performed on 24 May 2003 at the Eurovision Song Contest in Riga, Latvia. Sweden was drawn to perform in twenty-fifth position of the 26 competing entries, and subsequently Fame finished in fifth place, receiving 107 points in total, including the maximum 12 points from Romania.

== Track listing ==
CD single (MLCDS 011)

1. "Give Me Your Love" (Original Radio Version) - 3:03
2. "Give Me Your Love" (PVC One 5 Radio Mix) - 3:28
3. "Give Me Your Love" (PVC One 5 Club Mix) - 8:46
4. "Give Me Your Love" (PVC One 5 Ultra Dub) - 8:47

== Charts ==
=== Weekly charts ===
Chart (2003)	Peak position
Sweden (Sverigetopplistan)	1

=== Year-end charts ===
Chart (2003)	Position
Sweden (Hitlistan)	23

== Certifications ==
Region	Certification	Certified units/sales
Sweden (GLF)	Gold	15,000^{^}
^{^} Shipments figures based on certification alone.

== Certifications ==
In 2003, "Give Me Your Love" was certified gold in Sweden.
