= Grynet =

Swedish fictional character portrayed by Elin Ek

Grynet is a Swedish fictional character, an alter ego similar to fellow Scandinavian personality Silvía Night, portrayed by Elin Ek.

== Personality ==
Creator Elin Ek says that the character of Grynet just popped out of her head as an idea one day to do a character based on the typical Swedish teenager. Grynet loves everything pink and has her mantra "Don't take any shit from others".

== Grynets Show ==
On Grynets Show on Sveriges Television (SVT), she meets Swedish stars like Zlatan Ibrahimović and the members of A*Teens and shares craft projects that viewers can make on their own like applying a new design on handbags with glitter.

The Grynets Show is SVT's highest rated shows for kids ever.
