= Jessica Andersson =

Swedish singer

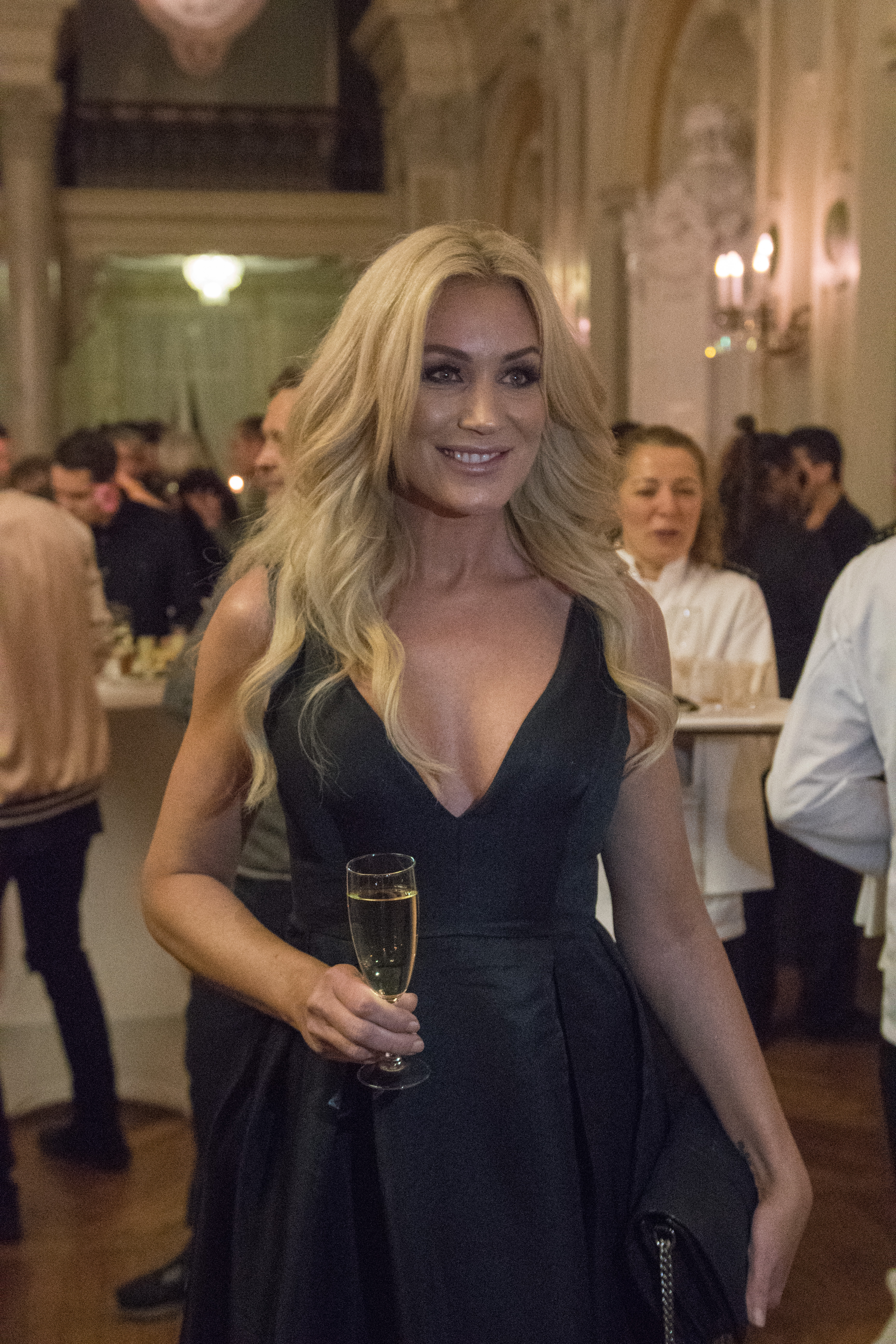
- Jessica Andersson (2018)

Background information
- Born: Jessica Arvidsson; 27 October 1973 (age 53); Spånga, Stockholm, Sweden
- Genre: Pop
- Years active: 2003–present
- Formerly of: Fame

Jessica Elisabeth Andersson (born Jessica Arvidsson on 27 October 1973) is a Swedish singer and songwriter. She was part of the Swedish duo Fame with Magnus Bäcklund between 2002 and 2006 after they met at the reality television show Fame Factory. As Fame, she represented Sweden in Eurovision Song Contest 2003 held in Riga, Latvia with "Give Me Your Love" finishing fifth.

After the breakup of the band, she developed a solo singing career, releasing four studio albums, and has appeared solo six times in Melodifestivalen competitions in 2006, 2007, 2010, 2015, 2018 and in 2021.

== Beginnings and in Fame Factory ==
Before becoming a TV celebrity, she worked amongst others as a singer in the floor show Svensk Schlager in Trollhättan where she resided. She also worked as a fashion model, including appearing in the magazine Café.

She gained fame after taking part in the 2002 series of the television show Fame Factory where she was pregnant through a relation with musician Jonas Erixon. The Swedish record manager Bert Karlsson proposed to put her in a duo with another Fame participant Magnus Bäcklund. The duo was called Fame.

== In Fame ==
Fame was formed in 2003 and under that banner, she took part in 2003 in Melodifestivalen under the name Fame, with "Give Me Your Love" that earned favour with the Swedish public and the jury winning in a landslide victory in Melodifestivalen 2003 at the Stockholm Globe Arena. They went on to participate in the Eurovision Song Contest, eventually garnering 107 points, which put them in fifth place.

With Eurovision success, Fame put up a full studio album also titled Give Me Your Love. It included fourteen tracks, eleven in English and three in Swedish. The track list had 8 songs performed by the duo, four solo tracks by Jessica Andersson herself (i.e. "Ett kort ögonblick", "Single Girl", "Anyway You Want It" and "Säg att du stannar kvar") and 2 solo tracks by Magnus Bäcklund

In 2004, Fame tried yet again for Melodifestivalen 2004, this time with "Vindarna vänder oss" ("The Winds Turn Us"), finishing just sixth overall. Fame folded in 2006, with both continuing with solo careers.

== Solo career ==
Andersson took part in the Melodifestivalen 2006 with the song "Kalla nätter" appearing in the third semi-final on 4 March 2006. The song did not qualify for the final, but was released as single and peaked at number 6 on the Swedish chart. In June, Andersson released "Du får för dig att du förför mig" which peaked at number 46.

In 2007, Andersson took part in the Melodifestivalen again, this time with the song "Kom" earning a place in the "Andra Chansen" (a second chance round) but failing to make the final. The song was subsequently released as a single and peaked at number 16 on the Swedish chart.

In 2007 and 2008, she played the female lead in the musical Little Shop of Horrors, that had a long run at the Halmstad theatre. She eventually won the Guldmasken award, equivalent to the American Tony Awards.

In November 2009, Andersson released her debut solo studio album, Wake Up, which peaked at number 10 on the Swedish Albums Chart. The album was proceeded by the single "Wake Up".

In 2010, Andersson returned to the Melodifestivalen, with the song "I Did It for Love". The song reached the final, finishing 8th overall. The song was released as a single and peaked at number 13 on the Swedish Singles Chart.

In 2011, Andersson competed in Let's Dance 2011 (the sixth season of the Swedish version of Strictly Come Dancing) She partnered Kristjan Lootus and was declared the winner on 25 March. In 2011, she released a biography which has sold over 120,000 copies.

In 2013, Andersson released her second studio album, 40.14.4.

In 2015, Andersson competed in the Melodifestivalen for the fourth time. The song "Can't Hurt Me Now" made the final ultimately placing 11th. In April, Andersson released her third studio album Perfect Now, which peaked at number 3.

In November 2016, Andersson released the joint Christmas album Once Upon a Christmas Night with Magnus Carlsson.

In February 2018, Andersson made her fifth appearance at the Melodifestivalen with a song called "Party Voice". The song reached the final, finishing 11th overall.

In February 2021, Andersson took part in the Melodifestivalen for the sixth time as a solo artist with the song “Horizon”. The song did not qualify for the final.

== Personal life ==
Andersson (born Arvidsson) lived in Spånga, Hagfors, Lidköping and Skövde, and since 1997 has been residing in Trollhättan. She was married to singer Rickard Andersson from 1994 to 1996 and has kept her husband's surname even after their divorce. She has one son, Liam (born on 29 October 2002), from a relation with musician Jonas Erixon.

== Discography ==
=== Studio albums ===
Title	Details	Peak chart positions
Title	Details	SWE
Wake Up	Released: 11 November 2009; Label: Warner Elektra Atlantic; Format: CD, Digital download	10
40.14.4	Released: October 2013; Label: BMG Chrysalis; Format: CD, Digital download	6
Perfect Now	Released: April 2015; Label: Universal; Format: CD, Digital download	3
Once Upon a Christmas Night (with Magnus Carlsson) (EP)	Released: November 2016; Label: Downtown Records; Format: CD, Digital download	-

=== Singles ===
Title	Year	Peak chart positions	Certifications	Album
Title	Year	SWE	Certifications	Album
"Kalla nätter"	2006	6		Non-album singles
"Du får för dig att du förför mig"	2006	46		Non-album singles
"Kom"	2007	16		Non-album singles
"Längtan" (with Nordman)	2008	—		Non-album singles
"Wake Up"	2009	—		Wake Up
"I Did It for Love"	2010	13		Wake Up (2010 Version)
"Precis där du hör hemma"	2011	—		Non-album single
"Septembermorgon"	2013	—		40.14.4
"Ingen kan älska som vi"	2013	—		40.14.4
"Aldrig, aldrig"	2013	—		40.14.4
"Can't Hurt Me Now"	2015	86		Perfect Now
"En Stilla Väntan" (with Magnus Carlsson)	2016	—		Once Upon a Christmas Time
"Calleth You, Cometh I"	2016	—		Non-album singles
"Vintersaga"	2017	—		Non-album singles
"Party Voice"	2018	18		Non-album singles
"Go Slow"	2019	—		Non-album singles
"Horizon"	2021	74		Non-album singles
"—" denotes a single that did not chart or was not released in that territory.

== Musical theatre ==
- 2007–2008: Little Shop of Horrors – lead role

Preceded by Afro-dite with "Never Let It Go"	Sweden in the Eurovision Song Contest (as part of Fame); 2003	Succeeded by Lena Philipsson with "Det gör ont"
