= Kom (Jessica Andersson song) =

Single by Jessica Andersson
- A-side: "Kom"
- Released: 9 March 2007
- Genre: Disco-pop, Europop, pop
- Length: 2:59
- Label: M&L Records
- Songwriter(s): Rob Wåtz; Raz Lindwall
- Producer(s): Rob Wåtz; Raz Lindwall

Jessica Andersson singles chronology
"Du får för dig att du förför mig" (2006)	"Kom" (2007)	"Längtan" (2008)

Kom (transl. "Come") is a song written by Rob Wåtz and Raz Lindwall and performed by Jessica Andersson. The song was selected as one of the competing songs in Melodifestivalen 2007, a song competition to represent Sweden at the Eurovision Song Contest. The song finished fourth in the second semi-final on 10 February 2007 and processed to the second chance round, where it was eliminated by Sanna Nielsen's "Vågar du, vågar jag" on 3 March 2007.

The single was released on 9 March 2007, peaking at number 16 on the Swedish Singles Chart.

== Track listing ==
CD single

1. "Kom" (Original) - 3:00
2. "Kom" (Extended Version) - 3:29
3. "Kom" (Single Version) - 2:59

== Charts ==
Chart (2007)	Peak position
Sweden (Sverigetopplistan)	16

== Release history ==
Region	Release Date	Format	Label	Catalogue
Sweden	9 March 2007	CD single	M&L Records	MLCDS086
