= Aqua Playa =

Single by Afro-dite
- A-side: "Aqua Playa"
- Released: 2003
- Genre: Dance-pop, disco
- Label: M&L
- Songwriter(s): Marcos Ubeda

"Aqua Playa" is a song written by Marcos Ubeda and performed by Afro-dite at Melodifestivalen 2003, where it ended up 7th. The single peaked at 30th position at the Swedish singles chart. On 30 March 2003, the song was tested for Svensktoppen but failed to enter chart.

It was also released as a single.

== Charts ==
Chart (2003)	Peak position
Sweden (Sverigetopplistan)	30
