= Sarek (band) =

Former Swedish folk-pop band

- Origin: Sweden
- Genres: Folk-pop
- Years active: 2002–2012
- Members: Stina Engelbrecht, Jessica Wetterstrand, Zara Kronvall, Kristofer Pettersson, Göran Månsson

Sarek was a Swedish folk-pop band formed in 2002, taking their name from Sarek National Park. They debuted in 2002 with the single "Vinterland" ("Winter land") and in 2003 they broke through with their single "Genom eld och vatten" ("Through fire and water") in Melodifestivalen. The group parted ways in 2012.

The song "Genom eld och vatten" remained on the Swedish singles chart for 34 weeks, peaking at number 3. In the same year, the single "Solen glimmar" charted for four weeks, reaching #14. These songs were from the album Genom eld och vatten, which also charted for four weeks, reaching #48.

The next album Sarek (2004) reached #21 and stayed on the album chart for five weeks, and the single "Älvorna" peaked at #8 and remained for eight weeks.

== Discography ==
Sarek "Genom eld och vatten" (2003)
30 second sample from Sarek's "Genom eld och vatten".

Albums

- 2003 – Genom eld och vatten
- 2004 – Sarek
- 2008 – I natt ska marken skälva
- 2011 – Magiska toner

Singles

- 2002 – Vinterland
- 2003 – Genom eld och vatten
- 2003 – Solen glimmar
- 2004 – Älvorna
- 2004 – Medan stjärnorna vandrar
- 2004 – Törst
- 2004 – Alla änglar log
- 2008 – I natt ska marken skälva
- 2008 – Magiska sekunder

== Members ==
- Stina Engelbrecht (music, lyrics, vocals, chorus, kulning)
- Jessica Wetterstrand (vocals)
- Zara Kronvall (vocals)
- Kristofer Pettersson (nyckelharpa, accordion)
- Göran Månsson (flute, jew harp, percussion)

== See also ==
- Swedish folk music
- Nordman
- Timoteij
- Drängarna
