= Maria (Östen med Resten song) =

Single by Östen med Resten
- A-side: "Maria"
- B-side: "Maria"
- Released: 2003
- Songwriters: Larry Forsberg, Sven-Inge Sjöberg, Lennard Wastesson

"Maria" is a Swedish song written for the music contest Melodifestivalen 2003 written by Larry Forsberg, Sven-Inge Sjöberg and Lennard Wastesson, and performed by Östen med Resten. The song ended in 8th place.

The song charted at Svensktoppen, where it stayed for five weeks between 20 April-29 June, peaking at 4th position before leaving the chart.

== Charts ==
Chart (2003)	Peak position
Sweden (Sverigetopplistan)	51
