= Melodifestivalen 2003 =

Swedish music competition

Dates and venue
- Heat 1: 15 February 2003
- Heat 2: 22 February 2003
- Heat 3: 1 March 2003
- Heat 4: 8 March 2003
- Viewers' Choice: 9 March 2003
- Final: 15 March 2003

Production
- Broadcaster: Sveriges Television (SVT)
- Director: Sven Stojanovic
- Presenters: Heats, Final: Mark Levengood; Heat 1: Charlotte Nilsson; Lena Philipsson; Heat 2: Carola Häggkvist; Heat 3: Barbro Svensson; Heat 4: Roger Pontare; Viewers' Choice: Marianne Rundström; Rickard Olsson; Final: Jonas Gardell

Participants
- Number of entries: 32
- Number of finalists: 10

Vote
- Voting system: Heats and Viewers' Choice: 100% public vote Final: 50% public vote, 50% jury vote
- Winning song: "Give Me Your Love" by Fame

Melodifestivalen 2003 was the 43rd edition of the Swedish music competition Melodifestivalen, which was organised by Sveriges Television (SVT) and took place over a five-week period between 15 February and 15 March 2003. The winner of the competition was Fame with the song "Give Me Your Love", who represented Sweden in the Eurovision Song Contest 2003, where they came fifth with 107 points.

== Format ==
The heats for Melodifestivalen 2003 began on 15 February 2003. Ten songs from these heats qualified for the final on March 15, 2003. This was the second year that a heat format had been used for the competition. "När löven faller" composed by Carola Häggkvist and Ingemar Åberg was disqualified prior to the competition due to Carola's refusal to participate as an artist with no replacement singer found, while "Someone, Somewhere, Someday" composed by Peter Ågrenwill and Mattias Holmlund to be performed by Nathalie Family was disqualified due to the singer being under the required age of 16 years old at the time the Eurovision Song Contest would be held.

Competition Schedule
Show	Date	City	Venue
Heat 1	15 February 2003	Jönköping	Tipshallen
Heat 2	22 February 2003	Gothenburg	Scandinavium
Heat 3	1 March 2003	Luleå	Arcushallen
Heat 4	8 March 2003	Sundsvall	Nordichallen
Viewers' Choice	9 March 2003	Stockholm	SVT Broadcasting House
Final	15 March 2003	Stockholm	Stockholm Globe Arena

The Winners' Choice round was replaced by the Viewers' Choice round where the public could now vote for the top two songs among the third- and fourth- placed ones from the heats.

== Competing entries ==
Artist	Song	Songwriter(s)
Afro-dite	"Aqua Playa"	Marcos Ubeda
Alcazar	"Not a Sinner nor a Saint"	Lotta Ahlin; Bobby Ljunggren; Tommy Lydell
Aleena	"Better Believe It"	Aleena Gibson; Bobby Ljunggren; Tommy Lydell
Alive feat. Jesse Martin	"Ingen annan"	Lars Edvall; Mattias Reimer
Andrés Esteche	"Just Like a Boomerang"	Johan Fransson (artist); Niklas Edberger; Tim Larsson; Tobias Lundgren
Barbados	"Bye, Bye"	Lotta Ahlin; Bobby Ljunggren; Tommy Lydell
Brandsta City Släckers	"15 minuter"	Gustav Eurén; Karl Eurén; Niclas Arn
Bubbles	"TKO (Knock You Out)"	Fredrik Lenander; Lars Erlandsson; Paul Rein
Crosstalk	"Stronger"	Lars Edvall; Mattias Reimer
Da Buzz	"Stop! Look! Listen!"	Joakim Udd; Peter Boström; Pär Lönn; Urban Robertsson
DeDe	"Someone, Somewhere, Someday"	Mattias Holmlund; Peter Ågren
Fame	"Give Me Your Love"	Calle Kindbom; Carl Lösnitz
Fernando Brito	"No dudes en llamarme"	Fernando Brito; Johan Larsson
Jill Johnson	"Crazy in Love"	Larry Forsberg; Lennart Wastesson; Sven-Inge Sjöberg
Kerli & Locatellis	"Let's Go"	Johan Ekman; Jonas Liberg
Lina Hedlund	"Nothing Can Stop Me"	Aleena Gibson; Torbjörn Petersson
Liverpool	"Love Is All"	Larry Forsberg; Lennart Wastesson; Sven-Inge Sjöberg
Maarja	"He Is Always on My Mind"	Lars Edvall; Mattias Reimer
Markus Landgren	"Television"	Pernilla Sahlin; Peter Sahlin
Méndez	"Carnaval"	Gustav Jonsson; Leopoldo Méndez; Marcus Sepehrmanesh; Patrik Henzel; Tommy Tysper
Mikael Erlandsson	"Tills jag mötte dig"	Christian Antblad; Tommy Denander
Nanne Grönvall	"Evig kärlek"	Nanne Grönvall; Peter Grönvall
Östen med resten	"Maria"	Larry Forsberg; Lennart Wastesson; Sven-Inge Sjöberg
Pandora	"You"	Jan Johansen; Shirley Clamp; Tania Clamp
Pernilla Wahlgren & Jan Johansen	"Let Your Spirit Fly"	Anders Dannvik; Ola Höglund
Sanna Nielsen	"Hela världen för mig"	Thomas G:son
Sahlene	"We're Unbreakable"	Aleena Gibson; Bobby Ljunggren; Robert Olausson
Sarek	"Genom eld och vatten"	Mårten Eriksson; Stina Jadelius
Shanna Smith	"Tonight's the Night"	Richard Evenlind
Shirley Clamp	"Mr. Memory"	Lotta Ahlin; Bobby Ljunggren; Tommy Lydell
Sofia Källgren & Robert Wells	"My Love"	Marcos Ubeda
Style	"Stay the Night"	Brian Hobbs; Christer Sandelin; Jonas Stadling; Olle Törnström; Thomas Axelsson; Tommy Ekman

== Contest overview ==
=== Heat 1 ===
The first heat took place on 15 February 2003 at the Tipshallen in Jönköping. 2,977,000 viewers watched the heat live. A total of 429,810 votes were cast, with a total of SEK 3,653,385 collected for Radiohjälpen. The heat was hosted by Mark Levengood, Charlotte Nilsson, and Lena Philipsson.

R/O	Artist	Song	Votes		Place	Result
R/O	Artist	Song	Round 1	Round 2	Place	Result
1	Crosstalk	"Stronger"	14,651	—N/a	6	Out
2	DeDe Lopez	"Someone, Somewhere, Someday"	5,386	—N/a	7	Out
3	Méndez	"Carnaval"	26,836	34,576	3	Viewers' Choice
4	Alive feat. Jesse Martin	"Ingen annan"	5,341	—N/a	8	Out
5	Jill Johnson	"Crazy in Love"	42,697	48,786	2	Final
6	Da Buzz	"Stop! Look! Listen!"	16,817	—N/a	5	Out
7	Markus Landgren	"Television"	19,997	25,998	4	Viewers' Choice
8	Pernilla Wahlgren & Jan Johansen	"Let Your Spirit Fly"	95,703	90,302	1	Final

=== Heat 2 ===
The second heat took place on 22 February 2003 at the Scandinavium in Gothenburg. 3,180,000 viewers watched the heat live. A total of 632,206 votes were cast, with a total of SEK 5,373,751 collected for Radiohjälpen. The heat was hosted by Mark Levengood and Carola Häggkvist.

R/O	Artist	Song	Votes		Place	Result
R/O	Artist	Song	Round 1	Round 2	Place	Result
1	Andrés Esteche	"Just Like a Boomerang"	29,223	—N/a	5	Out
2	Sanna Nielsen	"Hela världen för mig"	46,841	79,015	2	Final
3	Kerli & Locatellis	"Let's Go"	15,334	—N/a	7	Out
4	Pandora	"You"	10,496	—N/a	8	Out
5	Brandsta City Släckers	"15 minuter"	42,354	52,459	4	Viewers' Choice
6	Fame	"Give Me Your Love"	69,283	125,975	1	Final
7	Aleena	"Better Believe It"	26,285	—N/a	6	Out
8	Alcazar	"Not a Sinner nor a Saint"	63,702	69,859	3	Viewers' Choice

=== Heat 3 ===
The third heat took place on 1 March 2003 at the Arcushallen in Luleå. 2,914,000 viewers watched the heat live. A total of 340,882 votes were cast, with a total of SEK 2,897,497 collected for Radiohjälpen. The heat was hosted by Mark Levengood and Barbro Svensson.

R/O	Artist	Song	Votes		Place	Result
R/O	Artist	Song	Round 1	Round 2	Place	Result
1	Barbados	"Bye, Bye"	36,287	38,144	2	Final
2	Shanna Smith	"Tonight's the Night"	5,861	—N/a	8	Out
3	Nanne Grönvall	"Evig kärlek"	11,771	—N/a	7	Out
4	Sarek	"Genom eld och vatten"	55,934	58,138	1	Final
5	Sofia Källgren & Robert Wells	"My Love"	22,381	—N/a	5	Out
6	Liverpool	"Love Is All"	23,105	19,615	4	Viewers' Choice
7	Shirley Clamp	"Mr. Memory"	11,962	—N/a	6	Out
8	Style	"Stay the Night"	37,145	19,708	3	Viewers' Choice

=== Heat 4 ===
The fourth heat took place on 8 March 2003 at the Nordichallen in Sundsvall. 3,047,000 viewers watched the heat live. A total of 444,972 votes were cast, with a total of SEK 3,782,262 collected for Radiohjälpen. The heat was hosted by Mark Levengood and Roger Pontare.

R/O	Artist	Song	Votes		Place	Result
R/O	Artist	Song	Round 1	Round 2	Place	Result
1	Sahlene	"We're Unbreakable"	20,817	—N/a	5	Out
2	Fernando Brito	"No dudes en llamarme"	7,526	—N/a	8	Out
3	Bubbles	"TKO (Knock You Out)"	37,669	44,994	3	Viewers' Choice
4	Maarja	"He Is Always on My Mind"	14,221	—N/a	6	Out
5	Östen med resten	"Maria"	69,716	86,354	1	Final
6	Lina Hedlund	"Nothing Can Stop Me"	20,878	27,581	4	Viewers' Choice
7	Mikael Erlandsson	"Tills jag mötte dig"	10,581	—N/a	7	Out
8	Afro-dite	"Aqua Playa"	51,974	51,378	2	Final

=== Viewers' Choice ===
The Viewers' Choice round took place on 9 March 2003 at the SVT Broadcasting House in Stockholm. 2,282,000 viewers watched the show live. A total of 341,866 votes were cast, with a total of SEK 2,905,861 collected for Radiohjälpen. The show was hosted by Marianne Rundström and Rickard Olsson.

R/O	Artist	Song	Votes	Place	Result
1	Méndez	"Carnaval"	33,315	5	Out
2	Markus Landgren	"Television"	21,763	7	Out
3	Brandsta City Släckers	"15 minuter"	44,191	3	Out
4	Alcazar	"Not a Sinner nor a Saint"	102,240	1	Final
5	Liverpool	"Love Is All"	28,060	6	Out
6	Style	"Stay the Night"	21,490	8	Out
7	Bubbles	"TKO (Knock You Out)"	55,596	2	Final
8	Lina Hedlund	"Nothing Can Stop Me"	35,211	4	Out

=== Final ===
The final took place on 15 March 2003 at the Stockholm Globe Arena in Stockholm. 3,813,000 viewers watched the show live. A total of 1,230,751 votes were cast, with a total of SEK 10,461,384 collected for Radiohjälpen. The show was hosted by Mark Levengood and Jonas Gardell.

R/O	Artist	Song	Juries	Televote		Total	Place
R/O	Artist	Song	Juries	Votes	Points	Total	Place
1	Fame	"Give Me Your Love"	108	229,753	132	240	1
2	Jill Johnson	"Crazy in Love"	100	116,440	22	122	4
3	Östen med resten	"Maria"	10	92,722	11	21	8
4	Afro-dite	"Aqua Playa"	48	59,520	0	48	7
5	Sanna Nielsen	"Hela världen för mig"	27	136,984	66	93	5
6	Barbados	"Bye Bye"	7	37,132	0	7	10
7	Sarek	"Genom eld och vatten"	11	127,143	44	55	6
8	Pernilla Wahlgren & Jan Johansen	"Let Your Spirit Fly"	90	156,702	88	178	2
9	Bubbles	"TKO (Knock You Out)"	10	91,979	0	10	9
10	Alcazar	"Not a Sinner nor a Saint"	62	182,376	110	172	3

Detailed jury votes
R/O	Song	Luleå	Umeå	Sundsvall	Falun	Karlstad	Örebro	Norrköping	Gothenburg	Växjö	Malmö	Stockholm	Total
1	"Give Me Your Love"	6	12	4	6	12	12	10	12	10	12	12	108
2	"Crazy in Love"	12	10	12	10	8	10	8	10	4	10	6	100
3	"Maria"		2	6			1	1					10
4	"Aqua Playa"	8	8	8	2	1	6	6	4		1	4	48
5	"Hela världen för mig"			2	1	4		4	8	8			27
6	"Bye Bye"		1			2				2	2		7
7	"Genom eld och vatten"	4			4					1		2	11
8	"Let Your Spirit Fly"	2	6	10	12	6	8	12	6	12	6	10	90
9	"TKO (Knock You Out)"	1		1			2		1		4	1	10
10	"Not a Sinner nor a Saint"	10	4		8	10	4	2	2	6	8	8	62
Jury spokespersons
Luleå – Maria Sjölund; Umeå – Sandra Warg; Sundsvall – Joachim Vogel; Falun – Anders Rosén; Karlstad – Karin Mannberg; Örebro – Antoni Matacz; Norrköping – Victoria Dyring; Gothenburg – Tina Nordström; Växjö – Grynet; Malmö – Anne Lundberg; Stockholm – Karin Falck

== Ratings ==
Viewing figures by show
Show	Air date	Viewers (millions)	Ref.
Heat 1	15 February 2003	2.977	
Heat 2	22 February 2003	3.180	
Heat 3	1 March 2003	2.914	
Heat 4	8 March 2003	3.047	
Viewers' Choice	9 March 2003	2.282	
Final	15 March 2003	3.813	

== See also ==
- Eurovision Song Contest 2003
- Sweden in the Eurovision Song Contest
- Sweden in the Eurovision Song Contest 2003
