= Svindlande affärer =

Single by Pernilla Wahlgren
- A-side: "Svindlande affärer"
- B-side: "Back Again"
- Label: Hanson Glendisc Prod
- Songwriter: Bengt Palmers

"Svindlande affärer", written by Bengt Palmers, is a song performed by Pernilla Wahlgren for the film of the same name in 1985.

The song was at Trackslistan for one week, 20th position on 3 August 1985, and Svensktoppen for 11 weeks during the period 13 October-22 December 1985. During the first three weeks, the song stayed at first position, and was the first one to top Svensktoppen when the program was restarted, after having been off-air since 13 June 1982.

A Framåt fredag parody was called Svindlande vapenaffärer, depicting the controversies of Swedish arms industry.
