= Kalla nätter =

Single by Jessica Andersson
- A-side: "Kalla nätter"
- Released: 6 March 2006
- Genre: Pop
- Length: 3:02
- Label: M&L Records
- Songwriter(s): Tim Larsson; Johan Fransson; Tobias Lundgren; Niklas Edberger
- Producer(s): Tim Larsson

Jessica Andersson singles chronology
"Kalla nätter" (2006)	"Du får för dig att du förför mig" (2006)

"Kalla nätter" (transl. "Cold Nights") is the debut single by Swedish singer Jessica Andersson. The song was written by Tim Larsson, Johan Fransson, Tobias Lundgren and Niklas Edberger. It was selected as one of the competing songs in Melodifestivalen 2006, a song competition to represent Sweden at the Eurovision Song Contest. The song came fifth in the third semi-final on 4 March 2006, and was eliminated from the competition.

The single was released two days later, peaking at number six on the Swedish Singles Chart in May.

== Track listing ==
CD single

1. "Kalla Nätter" (Original Version) - 3:02
2. "Kalla Nätter" (Singback Version) - 3:02

== Charts ==
Chart (2006)	Peak position
Sweden (Sverigetopplistan)	6

== Release history ==
Region	Release Date	Format	Label	Catalogue
Sweden	6 March 2006	CD single	M&L Records	MLCDS 0072
