= Elin Ek (actress) =

Swedish radio, television presenter and producer (born 1976)

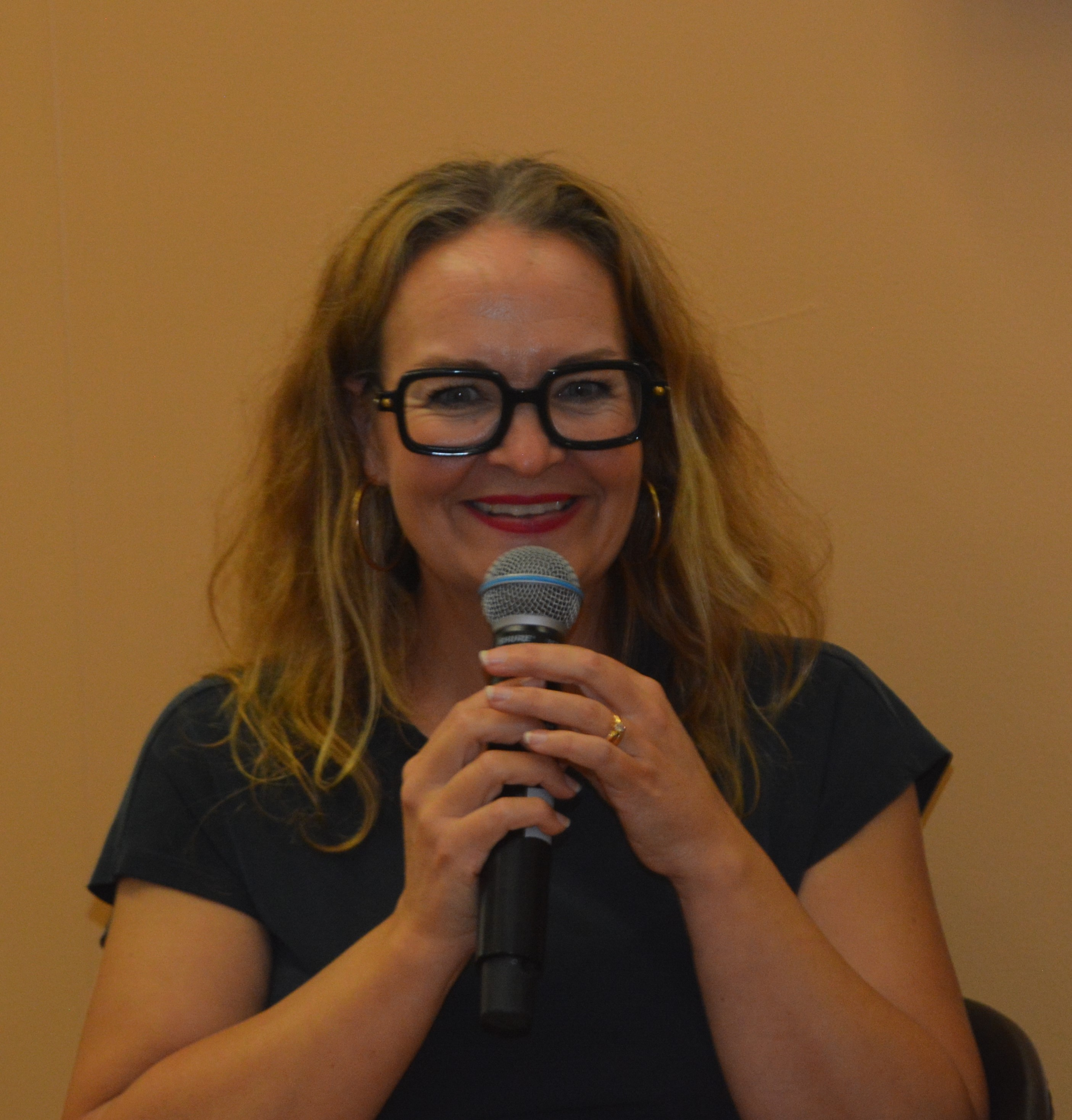
- Elin Ek in 2023
- Born: 28 December 1976 (age 49); Sundsvall, Sweden

Elin Ek (born 28 December 1976) is a Swedish radio and television actress who plays the character Grynet on Sveriges Television (SVT).

== Grynet ==
An alter ego similar to fellow Nordic personality Silvía Night, Elin Ek says that the character of Grynet just popped out of her head as an idea one day to do a parody on the typical Swedish teenager.

Grynet read Växjö's jury's votes in Melodifestivalen 2003, and was one of the hosts of the Second Chance round of Melodifestivalen 2004.

On Grynets Show on Sveriges Television (SVT), she meets Swedish stars like Zlatan Ibrahimović and the members of A*Teens and shares craft projects that viewers can make on their own like applying a new design on handbags with glitter.

The Grynets Show is SVT's highest rated shows for kids ever.

== Radio ==
Elin Ek has been both a producer and a host of programs on Sveriges Radio. She hosted the P1 program Sommar on 5 July 2004. On P3, she has been involved with Ketchup, Sommartoppen i P3, and Lantz i P3. In January 2007 she began involvement with the new program P3 Bubbel.
