= Genom eld och vatten =

Single by Sarek
- B-side: "Som inget annat fanns"
- Released: March 2003
- Label: Start klart
- Songwriters: Stina Jadelius, Mårten Eriksson

Sarek singles chronology
"Vinterland" (2002)	"Genom eld och vatten" (2003)	"Solen glimmar" (2003)

"Genom eld och vatten" is a song written by Stina Jadelius and Mårten Eriksson, and performed by Sarek at Melodifestivalen 2003, where it ended up 6th. On 30 March 2003, the song entered Svensktoppen, where it first ended up fourth, and peaked at second position on 6 April 2003. On 12 October 2003, the song was knocked out of chart. The song was also released as a single. In 2021, a cover by Dolores peaked at number two on Sverigetopplistan's Heatseeker chart.

== Charts ==
=== Weekly charts ===
Chart (2003)	Peak position
Sweden (Sverigetopplistan)	3

=== Year-end charts ===
Chart (2003)	Position
Sweden (Sverigetopplistan)	12
