= Bianca Ingrosso =

Swedish blogger, social influencer, entrepreneur, and singer

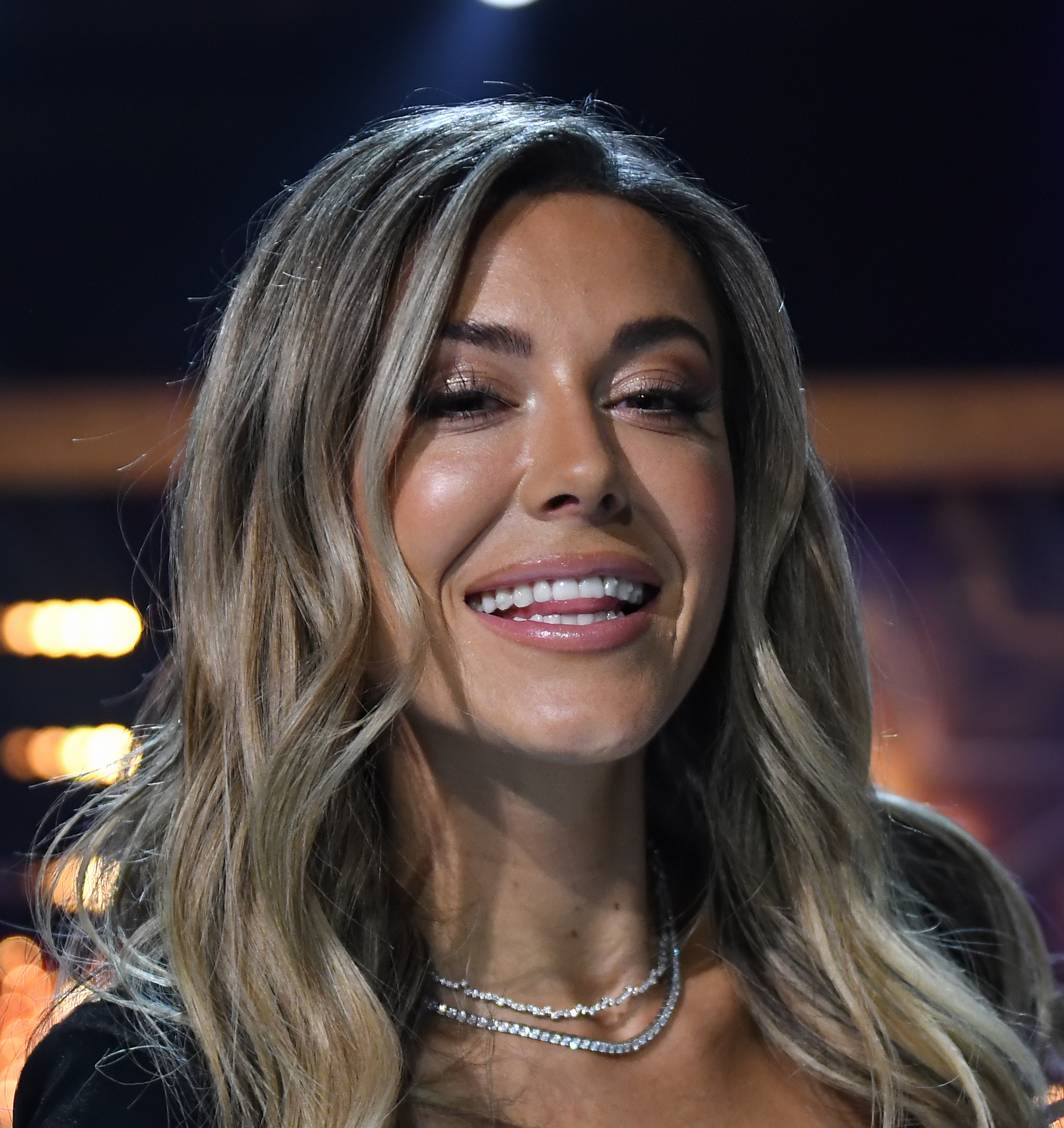
- Ingrosso in 2021
- Born: Bianca Melina Elisabeth Wahlgren Ingrosso; 30 December 1994 (age 31); Stockholm, Sweden
- Occupations: Television personality; blogger; social influencer; entrepreneur; singer
- Parents: Pernilla Wahlgren; Emilio Ingrosso
- Relatives: Benjamin Ingrosso (brother); Oliver Ingrosso (brother); Sebastian Ingrosso (paternal cousin); Christina Schollin (maternal grandmother); Hans Wahlgren (maternal grandfather); Linus Wahlgren (maternal uncle)

Bianca Melina Elisabeth Wahlgren Ingrosso (born 30 December 1994) is a Swedish blogger, social influencer, television personality, entrepreneur, and singer.

== Career ==
=== Performances ===
Ingrosso participated in the Swedish national selection for the Junior Eurovision Song Contest 2006 alongside friend Malin Eriksson. Their song, "Kan det bli vi två", finished in second place. She performed as Louisa von Trapp in a 2007 run of the musical The Sound of Music held at Göta Lejon theatre. In 2008, she participated in the Astrid Lindgren based musical Hujeda mig så många sånger, alongside her brother Benjamin Ingrosso and under the direction of her uncle, Linus Wahlgren. Ingrosso was a contestant on Let's Dance 2016, ultimately placing second in the final against Elisa Lindström.

=== Judge ===
She served as a talent judge on Talang, from 2018 to 2022.

=== Reality television ===
Ingrosso participates in the Kanal 5 television series Wahlgrens värld and the streaming service MAX along with her mother Pernilla. The reality series debuted in the fall of 2016, and it documents the lives and work of their family. In late 2021, it was announced that Ingrosso would no longer appear on the series but instead focus on her other work projects.

=== Podcast ===
In 2017, Ingrosso and Alice Stenlöf debut their podcast' Alice & Bianca – Har du sagt A får du säga B which lasted until August 2019.

She presented an episode of Sommar i P1 broadcast on Sveriges Radio in 2018, where she spoke about her life.

=== Award ===
Ingrosso and her mother Pernilla won the TV personality award at Kristallen 2018.

=== Caia Cosmetics ===
Caia Cosmetics is a beauty brand and e-commerce company founded by Bianca Ingrosso, Vanessa Lindblad, Jesper Matsch and Mikael Snabb. It has been very successful since its start, but lately been involved in controversy around toxic makeup.

== Personal life ==
Bianca Ingrosso is the daughter of Pernilla Wahlgren and Emilio Ingrosso, the sister of Benjamin Ingrosso, the granddaughter of Christina Schollin and Hans Wahlgren, niece of Charlotte Perrelli, and a cousin of Sebastian Ingrosso.

== Discography ==
=== Singles ===
Title	Year	Peak chart positions	Album
Title	Year	SWE	Album
"Kan det bli vi två"	2006	—	Non-album singles
"Blomstertid"	2021	2	Non-album singles
"Superstar"	2023	3	Non-album singles
"Boys in the Sea"	2024	55	Non-album singles
