= Bubbles (band) =

Swedish girl group

- Origin: Gothenburg, Sweden
- Genres: Pop, teen pop, EDM, Euro-House, Eurodance
- Years active: 1998–2010
- Members: Caroline Ljungström; Hannah Steffenburg; Jenny Andersén; Patricia Joxelius; Sandra Joxelius
- Website: Bubbles / Bless

Bubbles, also known as Bless, was a Swedish Eurodance group. The group's original lineup consisted of Caroline Ljungström, Patricia Joxelius, Sandra Joxelius, Jenny Andersén and Hannah Steffenburg.

== History ==
=== Beginning ===
The five girls of Bubbles met while attending dance classes together. Their dance teacher, who is also a well known TV show host, was discussing young talents with friends and music producers. The producers were looking for a young band with star quality, and she told them about those five dance girls. Their talent and enthusiasm led producer and songwriter team of John Ballard and Alban Herlitz to approach the girls and their families and ask a simple question: ”Would you like to make a record with us?”

The girls sang with the internationally successful Tuff Studios (Ace of Base).

=== Early success ===
Bubbles' first single, "Happy Girl", peaked at number six in the Swedish charts, and was very popular among children. It stayed in the charts for 26 weeks, longer than any other single that year. The girls supported Swedish mega-star Markoolio on his tour throughout the summer of year 2000 and finished it off with a performance at the Globe Arena, Stockholm, in front of 14,000 screaming fans. More than 500,000 people attended the successful summer tour. The follow-up "Rock The World" reached the number two spot and gold status (close to platinum before deleted in order to increase album sales) and is counted one of the really big hits in the year of 2000.

In the summer of 2001, Bubbles performed with eight of their own hit songs at the summer gala tour - ABSOLUTE KIDZ TOUR together with Sweden's most popular artists. Despite them being youngest, Bubbles got the best reviews of all performing artists on stage from the critics in the papers. In January 2001, Bubbles appeared on the biggest national TV charity gala competing in a pop festival against a number of Sweden's most respected artists - and winning with the new Swedish song "Regnbågens Barn" (Children of the Rainbow). The winning track was released on a double-A-side single together with ”I'll Be There” reaching number seven in the Sales Chart, even without a video. The single also reached gold status.

By then Bubbles were very popular in the Netherlands where their debut CD album Rock The World also made it to gold status. They are mostly popular in Sweden, although one of their songs, "Somewhere", was included in the motion picture Ice Age. Their first major hit was "Happy Girl" which got to number six on Swedish charts. Although it was also released in the Australian country as a single and on a compilation, it failed to chart. Their second single, "Rock the World", managed to get up to number two in the Swedish charts. They also went on tour between 2000 and 2004 with some big turnouts.

=== International success and Eurovision Song Contest ===
During the autumn, the record company in Germany wanted Bubbles to start gaining fans in their country too. During Christmas 2001, they recorded a duet version of their hit single "X-mas Time" changing title to "It's Christmas Time"; The duet partner was the US-born star Kathy Kelly (from the Kelly Family). Bubbles and Kelly performed at the biggest German TV shows and galas. In France, Bubbles alone performed at the biggest TV shows along with artists such as Janet Jackson, Lenny Kravitz and Henri Salvador.

In February 2002, Bubbles recorded the hit single "Somewhere" for the animated film Ice Age. In their home country Sweden, Bubbles managed to be number one for several weeks at the most popular top-ten TV show "Voxpop" in competition with many worldwide artists.

=== Inbetween era ===
During the spring of 2002, Bubbles recorded the album "Inbetween". (Between childhood and adulthood.) Inbetween was very successful and made Bubbles as worldwide stars. The music video for "Round n Round" was filmed in Amsterdam, the Netherlands at the end of summer 2002. The music video for "Somewhere", which is included in Ice Age, was released in April 2002. Their second album "Inbetween" was very much delayed due to trouble between record companies and was finally released on 4 November 2002.

In 2003, Bubbles made it to the Eurovision Song Contest final of Sweden with the hit single "TKO (Knock You Out)". Covers, centerfolds and headlines in the papers and in television made them well known to all Swedish people.

For the first time since their debut single, focusing was now on Sweden only during spring and summer. The largest Bubbles tour ever began on 18 May and ended on 30 September, making more than 120,000 fans and families happy in 35 concerts all over the country.

=== Second attempt at Eurovision Song Contest; Bless; Fourth unreleased album and departure: 2004–2010 ===
On 28 August 2004, the third album Bless was released. Bless was a lot more mature compared to the other albums and songs released by Bubbles, along with Bubbles' maturing voices.

The album was followed by the single release of "Hit The Floor" which reached number four in the Sales Charts in December.

During the spring of 2004, Bubbles chose to compete a second consecutive year in the most popular TV show of all - Swedish finals for Eurovision Song Contest. Participating last year was a complete success, so when Bubbles was offered the cool song "Blow The Spot" they couldn't turn it down. "Blow The Spot" was written and produced by internationally successful RedFlyMusic/TwinProduction who has worked with Mary J. Blige, Kylie Minogue, Jamiroquai, S Club Juniors, Sophie Ellis Bextor, and more.

Bubbles made huge headlines and billboards making the most out of their performance doing the slick but groovy production of disco-funky Blow The Spot. The song reached semifinal, but in the sales chart it showed great result reaching a stunning number two

Their latest release as of 31 May 2006 is "You Dog Me Out" which is from their upcoming fourth album. It has been announced on their official site that they are expecting the album to be released in the spring of 2008. In an interview on 18 August 2007, Bubbles is working hard at their current album. Lina and Jessi from "BubblesFansite" are interviewing Hannah and Patricia and they told them "Calling Out", "Turn Up" and "Soul Shaker" are their favourites. However, the fourth album is taking more time than expected. In spring 2008 the 13th single is not coming out, because of this Caroline Ljungström left the group to try a solo career. She started her own band, The Obs. More than a one-year later, there is still little progress in it. The reason for all this delay is the fact that the girls are now very busy with working, studying and their social life.

In early 2009, the band announced a yet-to-be released single, but a few days later the article was removed from the website. At the beginning of 2010 the manager announced that Bubbles are not coming back.

== Discography ==
=== Singles ===
Year	Single	Chart peak	Other Notes
Year	Single	Sweden	Other Notes
2000	"(I'm a) Happy Girl"	6	
2000	"Rock the World"	2	
2000	"X-Mas Time"	12	
2000	"My Boyfriend"	25	
2001	"Regnbågens Barn/I'll Be There"	7	
2002	"Somewhere"	10	Included on the Ice Age soundtrack, but not released in the U.S.
2002	"Round N Round"	30	
2003	"TKO (Knock You Out)"	7	Melodifestivalen 2003 entry, finished 9th in final.
2003	"Hit the Floor"	4	
2004	"Blow the Spot"	2	Melodifestivalen 2004 entry, didn't reach the final.
2006	"You Dog Me Out"	—	

=== Albums ===
Year	Title
2001	Rock the World
2001	Rock the World, 2nd Edition
2002	Inbetween
2003	Bless
