= Christina Schollin =

Swedish actress

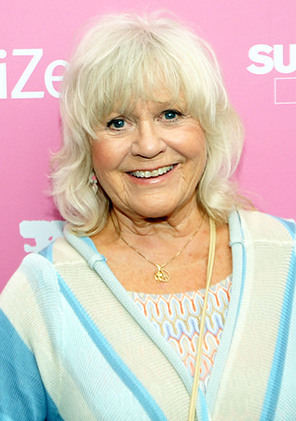
- Christina Schollin in Stockholm, 2015.
- Born: Christina Alma Elisabet Schollin; 26 December 1937 (age 88); Stockholm, Sweden
- Other name: Christina Skolin (1956)
- Occupation: Actress
- Spouse: Hans Wahlgren (m. 1962; died 2024)
- Children: 4, including Niclas, Pernilla and Linus
- Relatives: Oliver Ingrosso (grandson); Bianca Ingrosso (granddaughter); Benjamin Ingrosso (grandson)

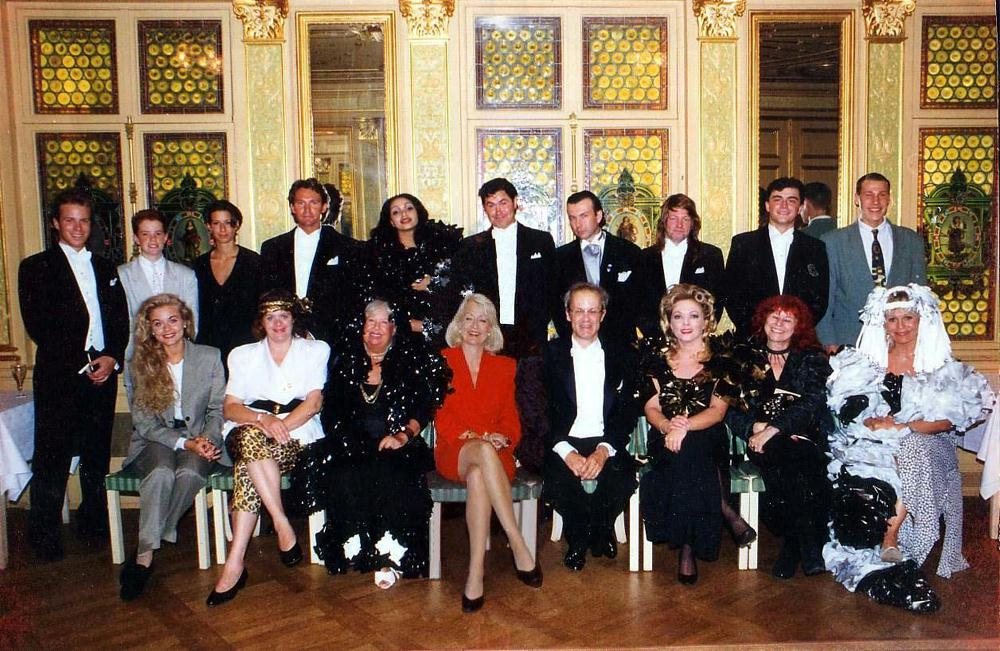
Schollin (far right) with Johanna Lind, Camilla Henemark, Alexandra Charles and others celebrates the 1993 Mae West Birth Centenary at Berns

Christina Alma Elisabet Schollin (pronounced [skʊˈliːn]; born 26 December 1937) is a Swedish actress. She is best known to international audiences mainly through her appearances in motion pictures, such as Dear John, Song of Norway and Ingmar Bergman's Fanny and Alexander.

The "angel" theme has become an integral part of Schollin's image, and until 2011, she ran her own gift shop with that motif and product, plus an adjacent lounge for performing arts, in the Old Town Gamla stan of Stockholm.

She is known from television in Sweden for her leading roles in the series Varuhuset and Tre Kronor, and more recently as the matriarch in her daughter Pernilla Wahlgren's TV series Wahlgrens värld (Wahlgren World) on Kanal 5 and MAX.

She won the award for Best Actress at the 3rd Guldbagge Awards for her role in Ormen.

After arguing in 1963 about maternity leave with Dramaten's director and theatre boss Ingmar Bergman, Schollin left the contracted Dramaten players and did not return until 1989. After almost 30 years she came back there again in 2022 as Lady Macbeth, even then with very good reviews.

== Family ==
She was married to actor Hans Wahlgren from 1962 until his death in 2024 and had four children with him: Peter, Niclas, Pernilla (above) and Linus Wahlgren. A notable grandson is Benjamin Ingrosso.
