= Emilio Ingrosso =

Swedish dancer, composer, and restaurant owner

Emilio Ingrosso (born 16 July 1965) is a Swedish-Italian dancer, composer and restaurant owner. He was the background dancer for Pernilla Wahlgren when she performed the song Piccadilly Circus in Melodifestivalen 1985. The two married in 1993 and remained together until 2002. The couple has three children together: Oliver Ingrosso, Bianca Wahlgren Ingrosso and Benjamin Ingrosso. Ingrosso has been married to Åsa Björling since 2016. He owns two restaurants in Mallorca, Spain.

In the late 1980s, Ingrosso co-produced three of Pernilla Wahlgren's music albums. He also co-composed and co-wrote several of her songs, such as "Paradise", "I Need Your Love", "Pure Dynamite" and "Running For Cover". In 2017, he participated in his ex-wife Pernilla Wahlgren's reality series Wahlgrens värld. The show is broadcast on Kanal 5 and the streaming service MAX.
