= Norra Lagnö =

- Location within Stockholm Location within Sweden Location within European Union
- Coordinates: 59°21′N 18°25′E
- Country: Sweden
- Province: Uppland
- County: Stockholm County
- Municipality: Värmdö Municipality

Area
  - Total: 0.88 km^{2} (0.34 sq mi)

Population (31 December 2020)
  - Total: 377
  - Density: 430/km^{2} (1,100/sq mi)
- Time zone: UTC+1 (CET)
  - Summer (DST): UTC+2 (CEST)

Norra Lagnö is a locality situated on a peninsular on the northern shore of the island of Värmdö in Sweden's Stockholm archipelago. From an administrative perspective, it is located in Värmdö Municipality and Stockholm County and has 332 inhabitants as of 2010.

Norra Lagnö is the southern terminal of the Tynningöleden vehicle ferry route to the island of Tynningö, operated by Trafikverket, and is also a calling point for the passenger ferries of the Waxholmbolaget on its routes from the city of Stockholm to the central part of the Stockholm archipelago. Buses of Storstockholms Lokaltrafik also link Norra Lagnö with central Stockholm, operating via the Skurubron bridge that links Värmdö to the mainland.

== Notable people ==
- Christina Schollin
- Hans Wahlgren
