= Can't Hurt Me Now =

Single by Jessica Andersson
- Released: 13 February 2015
- Genre: Pop
- Length: 3:08
- Songwriter(s): Fredrik Thomander; Aleena Gibson

Jessica Andersson singles chronology
"Aldrig, aldrig" (2013)	"Can't Hurt Me Now" (2015)	"En Stilla Väntan" (2016)

"Can't Hurt Me Now" is a song written by Fredrik Thomander and Aleena Gibson and performed by Jessica Andersson at Melodifestivalen 2015, where the song ended up 11th in the final.

== Chart positions ==
Chart (2015)	Peak position
Sweden (Sverigetopplistan)	86
