= Ola and Marie Höglund =

Swedish–New Zealand glass artist duo

Ola Höglund (1956 – 20 December 2024) and Marie Höglund (born 1955) are Swedish–New Zealand glass artists. They met at the age of fifteen, trained at the same glass school, and almost always worked collaboratively.

== Early life and training ==
Marie Simberg-Höglund was born in 1955 in Gothenburg, Sweden and trained at Orrefors Glass Studios and then Kosta Boda. After focusing on engraving at Kosat Boda, Marie went on to two years studying handweaving and fabric design at Emmaboda College.

Ola Höglund was born in 1956 in Stockholm, Sweden. Between 1972 and 1977 he trained at Orrefors Glass Studios and Kosta Boda.

== Work in Sweden and Swaziland ==
In 1977, the two worked together at Vastkusthyttans Art Glass Studio, Marie as a designer-engraver and Ola as a designer-glassblower. From there they were sent in 1978 to Swaziland by the Swedish International Development Authority, where they spent three years there establishing a workshop and teaching glassblowing skills.

== Work in New Zealand ==
In 1982, the Höglunds emigrated to Nelson, New Zealand. Shortly after they arrived, potter Jack Laird invited them to set up a studio at Craft Habitat in Nelson, where they remained for nine years.

In 1994, they established Höglund Glassblowing Studio at Appleby, near Nelson. Ola typically blew the glass and Marie applied the surface treatment to the objects they created. Laird, writing about their work in 1987, noted that: "They see themselves as a team, jointly working on all projects, and developing ideas by responding to each other's suggestions and contributions". In their artistic practices, they widely used the graal technique first developed in Sweden in 1916. In 2002, they established Höglund Art Glass Studio in North Queensland as a winter studio. In 1999, the pair opened new gallery showrooms in Auckland, doing the same in Sydney the following year and launching a store in Melbourne in 2001.

In 1999, they were officially appointed glass artists for the America's Cup and they produced glassware for Team New Zealand in 2000 and 2003. In 2000, they were also awarded a licence to produce official merchandise for the Sydney Olympics.

In 2022, Ola Höglund was diagnosed with motor neuron disease. He died at Appleby on 20 December 2024, at the age of 68.

== Further sources ==
- Julie Warren, Ola and Marie Hoglund: Glorious Glass, Craft New Zealand 41, Spring 1992
- Jack Laird, Marie and Ola Hoglund: Scandinavian Skills in Nelson, New Zealand Crafts 20, Autumn 1987
