= Oliver Ingrosso =

Swedish DJ, music producer and actor (born 1989)

- Birth name: Oliver Salvatore Gustavo Wahlgren Ingrosso
- Born: 30 December 1989 (age 35); Stockholm, Sweden
- Genres: Progressive house
- Occupation(s): Electronic musician, DJ, record producer, actor
- Years active: 2007–present

Oliver Salvatore Gustavo Wahlgren Ingrosso (born 30 December 1989) is a Swedish DJ, record producer, and actor.

== Career ==
He debuted with a major role in the 2007 Swedish film Ciao Bella directed by Iranian-Swedish director Mani Maserrat-Agah. In the film he was credited with his birth name Oliver Wahlgren-Ingrosso. He played the role of Enrico, a young Italian football player who befriends Mustafa, a Swedish footballer of Iranian descent played by Poyan Karimi and trains Mustafa to "become" Massimo, just for the aim of attracting girls attending an international football tournament.

Using a shortened name Oliver Ingrosso, he started a musical career being a DJ in Progressive house music releasing an EP titled iTrack with Tim Berg (better known as Avicii) and Otto Knows and has appeared with well-known DJs like Tiësto, Armin van Buuren, Swedish House Mafia, Adrian Lux, Mandy and Adam Beyer. A great influence on him for pursuing a music career was the success of his cousin Sebastian Ingrosso, a long time member of Swedish House Mafia since 2005 and that opened up a lot of opportunities for Oliver Ingrosso. He has DJed in a great number of venues locally in Sweden and internationally in Toronto, New York, Brazil and Spain.

== Personal life ==
Ingrosso comes from an artistic family. He is the grandson of Swedish actor, lyricist and singer Hans Wahlgren and renowned actress Christina Schollin. His parents are artist Pernilla Wahlgren and dancer and restaurateur Emilio Ingrosso. He has two younger siblings, Bianca Wahlgren Ingrosso (born 1994) and Benjamin Wahlgren Ingrosso (born 1997) who is a singer. His paternal grandparents are Carmine and Melina (Carmina) Ingrosso, both born in Taranto, Italy.

After his mother and father had a bitter divorce, Pernilla Wahlgren married Joachim Lennholm and they have another son..

On September 6, 2023, Ingrosso and his partner Zoe-Fay Brown had a son.

== Discography ==
EPs

- 2010: iTrack EP (Tim Berg, Oliver Ingrosso & Otto Knows) [Stealth Records]

Singles

Year	Single	Peak chart positions				Album
Year	Single	SWE	BEL (Vl) Ultratip*	NED Dutch Top 40	NED Single Top 100	Album
2010	"iTrack" (Avicii vs. Oliver Ingrosso & Otto Knows)	—	—	30	53	iTrack EP
2012	"Run Away" (Kate Ryan with Tim Berg, Oliver Ingrosso & Otto Knows)	—	Tip37	—	—	Kate Ryan album Electroshock

*Did not appear in the official Belgian Ultratop 50 charts, but rather in the bubbling under Ultratip charts.

Other tracks

- 2010: "Gino" (Oliver Ingrosso, Tim Berg, Otto Knows)
- 2010: "LoopeDe" (Tim Berg vs. Oliver Ingrosso & Otto Knows)

== Filmography ==
- 2007: Ciao Bella as Enrico
