= Viktor Frisk =

Swedish fashion blogger and singer (born 1995)

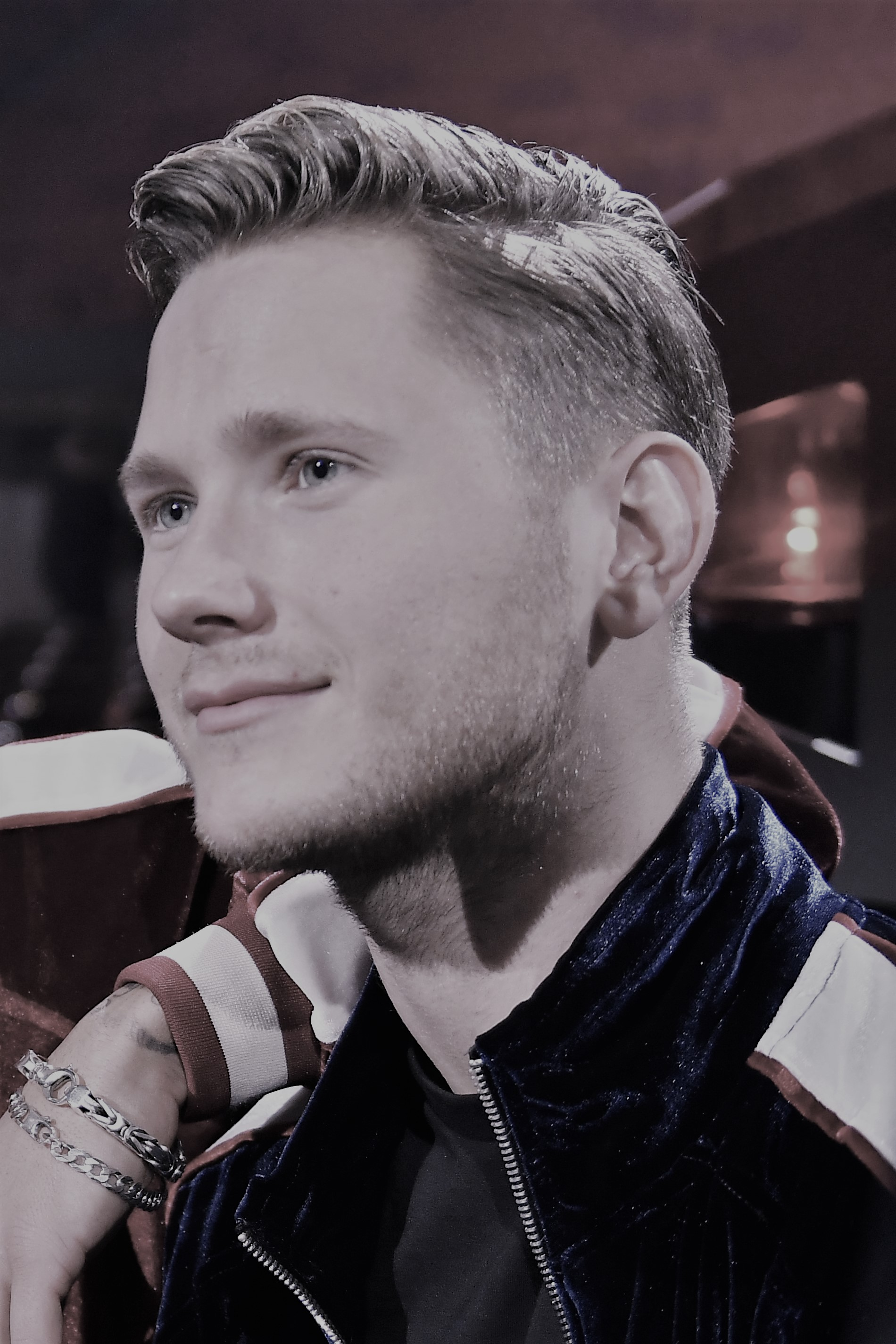
- Frisk in 2018

Background information
- Born: Carl Viktor Andersson Frisk; 2 March 1995 (age 31); Alberga, Sweden
- Genres: Pop
- Occupations: Singer; influencer; entrepreneur
- Instrument: Vocals
- Years active: 2014–present
- Labels: Stockhouse; Warner Music Sweden
- Formerly of: Samir & Viktor

Carl Viktor Andersson Frisk (born 2 March 1995) is a Swedish singer, influencer, and entrepreneur. He was part of the musical duo Samir & Viktor alongside Samir Badran.

== Career ==
In May 2014, the duo released their first music single called "Success". The song peaked at number one during its first week on the Swedish iTunes chart.

Samir & Viktor took part in Melodifestivalen 2015 with the song "Groupie" in a bid to represent Sweden in the Eurovision Song Contest 2015 in Vienna, Austria. They took part in Melodifestivalen 2016 as well with the song "Bada nakna". They also took part in Melodifestivalen 2018 with the song "Shuffla". He participated in Let's Dance 2018 broadcast on TV4 and finished in 5th place.

In 2017, Frisk published his first book Min Superkraft (My Superpower), which deals with his personal experiences living with an ADHD diagnosis. In 2018, Frisk published his second book Samir & Viktor, this time along with Badran. The same year Frisk made an art print about ADHD with designer David Thornell.

== Personal life ==
In August 2016, he came out as bisexual on Instagram, and years later, he came out as gay. In April 2022, he became engaged to his partner Andreas Gran.

== Discography ==
=== Singles ===
as Samir & Viktor

- 2014: "Success"
- 2015: "Groupie
- 2015: "Saxofuckingfon"
- 2016: "Bada nakna"
- 2016: "Fick Feeling"
- 2017: "Kung"
- 2017: "Vi gör det ändå"
- 2017: "Rakt in i kaklet"
- 2018: "Shuffla"
- 2018: "Put Your Hands Up för Sverige"

as Himself

- 2017: "Allting ordnar sig"
- 2023 : "skål"

== Bibliography ==
- 2017 – Min Superkraft ISBN 9789137149943
- 2018 – Samir & Victor ISBN 9789188745224
