= Samir Badran =

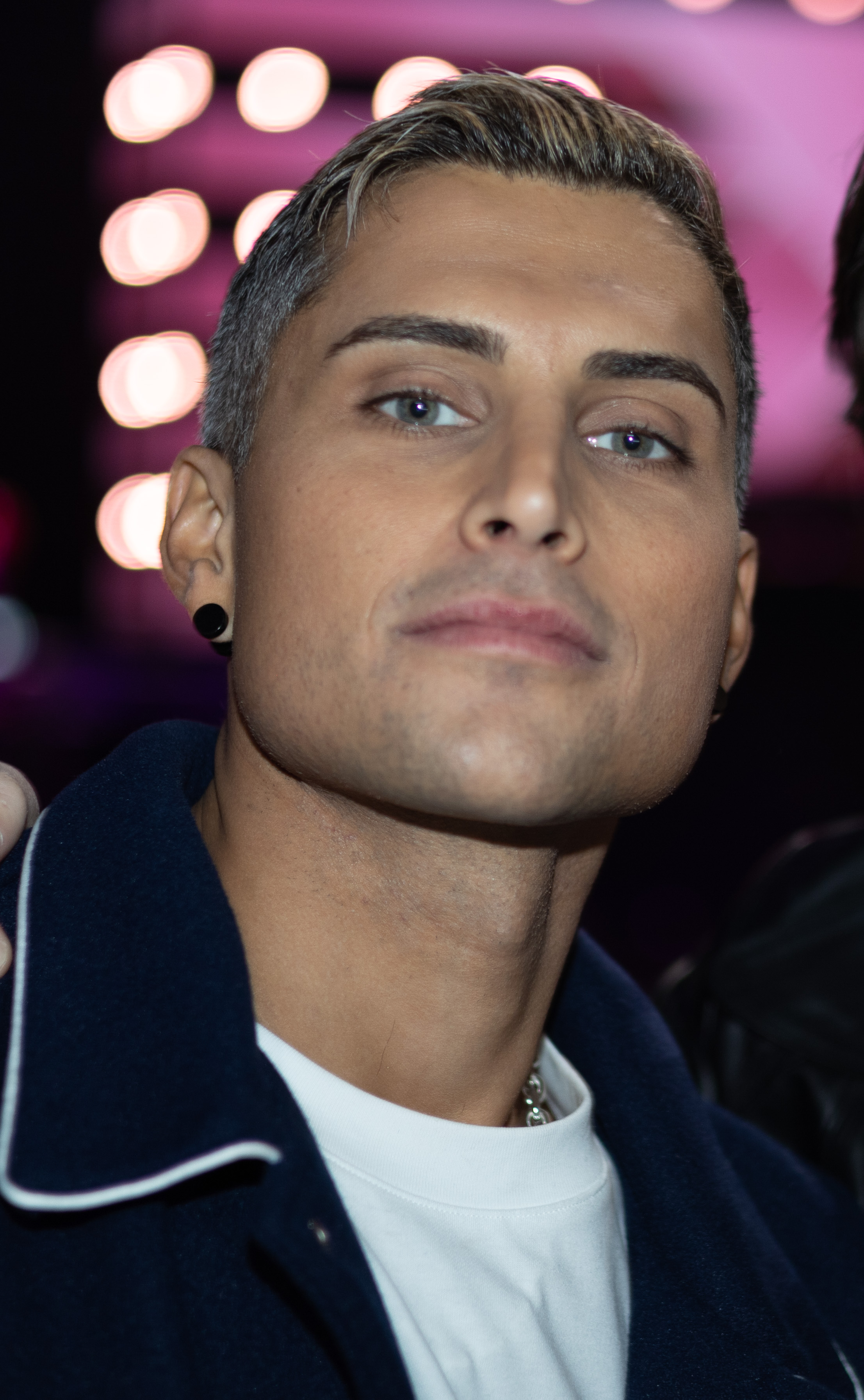
- Samir Badran in 2024

Background information
- Born: Samir Gustav Andersson; 25 May 1990 (age 36); Linköping, Sweden
- Genre: Pop
- Occupations: Singer; television personality
- Instrument: Vocals
- Years active: 2014–2022, 2023–present
- Labels: Stockhouse; Warner Music Sweden
- Member of: Samir & Viktor

Samir Gustav Badran (Arabic: سمير غوستاف بدران; born Andersson, 25 May 1990) is a Swedish television personality and singer.

== Career ==
In 2013, Badran participated in the reality series Paradise Hotel broadcast on TV3. He also took part in Paradise Hotel again in the 2014 season for one week. Along with the fashion blogger Viktor Frisk, Badran started the music duo Samir & Viktor. In May 2014, the duo released their first single, "Success". The song peaked at number one on the Swedish iTunes chart during its first week. Samir & Viktor participated in Melodifestivalen 2015 with the song "Groupie", in a bid to represent Sweden in the Eurovision Song Contest 2015 in Vienna, Austria. They went for it a second time in 2016 with the song "Bada nakna", reaching twelfth place in the competition but hitting the number one spot on the Swedish DigiListan sales chart in February 2016. Badran then competed in the celebrity dance show Let's Dance 2017, which was broadcast on TV4 and he finished in fifth place. He also participated in Farmen VIP 2018, which was broadcast on TV4. He was furthermore the co-presenter of Talang from 2019 to 2021. Samir did the "Vasaloppet" in 2025. He is rumored to return to Paradise hotel in the upcoming seasons.

== Personal life ==
Badran grew up in Linköping with his mother Margareta and his father Ahmad. Badran's father is of Palestinian origin and was born in the Gaza Strip; he has relatives in the area, whom he says to visit them when it is possible. On 31 July 2014, a nine-year-old cousin of Badran was killed during the Israeli bombing of the UN school in the Jabalia refugee camp.

Badran dated Mikaela Samuelsson in 2015.

In 2020, he confirmed that he was studying to become a real estate agent and as of 2022, he was working as in this position at Mäklarhuset in Stockholm.

== Discography ==
=== Singles ===
Solo

| Title | Year | Peak chart positions | Certifications | Album |
| Title | Year | SWE | Certifications | Album |
|---|---|---|---|---|
| "Vet att du vill ha mig" (feat. Kevin) | 2014 | 18 | | Non-album singles |
| "Karma Is a Bitch" | 2017 | — | | Non-album singles |
| "När jag ligger med nån annan" (with Sigrid Bernson) | 2018 | 68 | | Non-album singles |
| "Portkod" (with Anis don Demina and Nobel) | 2019 | — (Note: "Portkod" did not enter the Swedish Singellista Chart, but peaked at number seven on the Swedish Heatseeker Chart.) | | Non-album singles |
| "The Fucking Lundells" (featuring Johanna Öholm) | 2026 | 11 | | Non-album singles |

as Samir & Viktor

- 2014: "Success"
- 2015: "Groupie
- 2015: "Saxofuckingfon"
- 2016: "Bada nakna"
- 2016: "Fick Feeling"
- 2017: "Kung"
- 2017: "Vi gör det ändå"
- 2017: "Rakt in i kaklet"
- 2018: "Shuffla"
