= Masked Singer Sverige season 6 =

Masked Singer Sverige
- Season 6

Release
- Original network: TV4
- Original release: 27 March – 22 May 2026

Season chronology
- ← Previous; Season 5

The sixth season of the Swedish version of Masked Singer started on 27 March, 2026 on TV4. The new panel member for this season is Edvin Törnblom. Måns Zelmerlöw left the show after the fifth season.

== Contestants ==
Stage Name	Identity	Occupation	Episode								
Stage Name	Identity	Occupation	1	2	3	4	5	6	7	8	9
Punk Papegojan "Punk Parrot"	John Lundvik	Singer	RISK		SAFE		SAFE		RISK	RISK	WINNER
Sheriffen "Sheriff"	Emil Henrohn	Artist		WIN		SAFE		WIN	WIN	WIN	RUNNER-UP
Gräsklipparen "Lawnmower"	Caroline Seger	Footballer	WIN		SAFE		WIN		RISK	SAFE	THIRD
Karate-Katten "Karate Cat"	Kim Sulocki	Actor		WIN		SAFE		SAFE	WIN	OUT	
Äggen "Eggs"	Alexander Pärleros	Podcasters	WIN		RISK		SAFE		WIN	OUT	
Äggen "Eggs"	Ida Warg	Podcasters	WIN		RISK		SAFE		WIN	OUT	
Stekaren "Upperclassman"	Stefan Holm	Retired high jumper		RISK		RISK		SAFE	OUT		
Knasbollen "Goofball"	Anna Book	Singer		WIN		SAFE		OUT			
Pom Pom Pomeranian	Agneta Sjödin	TV Presenter	WIN		SAFE		OUT				
Höstacken "Haystack"	Tina Nordström	Chef/TV Personality		RISK		OUT					
Mumien "Mummy"	E-Type	Musician	RISK		OUT						
Ökenråttan "Gerbil"	Thomas Bodström	Former Politician		OUT							
Jättebebisen "Giant Baby"	Isa Östling	Social media influencer	OUT								

== Episodes ==
=== Week 1 (27 March) ===
Performances on the first episode
#	Stage name	Song	Result	
1	Jättebebisen	"Don't Stop the Music" by Rihanna	RISK	
2	Pom Pom Pomeranian	"Shake It Off" by Taylor Swift	WIN	
3	Punk Papegojan	"Golden" by Huntrix	RISK	
4	Gräsklipparen	"Look Who's Laughing Now" by Benjamin Ingrosso	WIN	
5	Mumien	"September" by Earth, Wind & Fire	RISK	
6	Äggen	"Genom eld och vatten" by Medina	WIN	
Face-off details			Identity	Result
1	Jättebebisen	"...Baby One More Time" by Britney Spears	Isa Östling	OUT
2	Mumien	"Bara bada bastu" by KAJ	undisclosed	SAFE

=== Week 2 (3 April) ===
Performances on the second episode
#	Stage name	Song	Result	
1	Stekaren	"Espresso Macchiato" by Tommy Cash	RISK	
2	Knasbollen	"Black Widow" by Felicia	WIN	
3	Karate-Katten	"Bad Habits" by Ed Sheeran	WIN	
4	Ökenråttan	"Blinding Lights" by The Weeknd	RISK	
5	Höstacken	"Yihaa" by Dolly Style	RISK	
6	Sheriffen	"Addicted to You" by Avicii	WIN	
Face-off details			Identity	Result
1	Stekaren	"Sean den förste banan" by Sean Banan	undisclosed	SAFE
2	Ökenråttan	"La dolce vita" by After Dark	Thomas Bodström	OUT

=== Week 3 (10 April) ===
Performances on the third episode
#	Stage name	Song	Result	
1	Mumien	"It Must Have Been Love" by Roxette	RISK	
2	Gräsklipparen	"Eye of the Tiger" by Survivor	SAFE	
3	Punk Papegojan	"I Have Nothing" by Whitney Houston	SAFE	
4	Äggen	"Barbie Girl" by Aqua	RISK	
5	Pom Pom Pomeranian	"Try Everything" by Shakira	SAFE	
Face-off details			Identity	Result
1	Mumien	"Shuffla" by Samir & Viktor	E-Type	OUT
2	Äggen	"Vem e som oss" by Anis Don Demina	undisclosed	SAFE

=== Week 4 (17 April) ===
Performances on the fourth episode
#	Stage name	Song	Result	
1	Stekaren	"Never Gonna Give You Up" by Rick Astley	RISK	
2	Höstacken	"I Wanna Dance with Somebody" by Whitney Houston	RISK	
3	Sheriffen	"Take On Me" by A-ha	SAFE	
4	Karate-Katten	"Maniac" by Michael Sembello	SAFE	
5	Knasbollen	"The Winner Takes It All" by ABBA	SAFE	
Face-off details			Identity	Result
1	Stekaren	"Mambo No. 5 (A Little Bit Of...)" by Lou Bega	undisclosed	SAFE
2	Höstacken	"Mer av dig" by Theoz	Tina Nordström	OUT

=== Week 5 (24 April) ===
Performances on the fifth episode
#	Stage name	Song	Identity	Result
1	Pom Pom Pomeranian	"Wings" by Little Mix	Agneta Sjödin	OUT
1	Pom Pom Pomeranian	"Telephone" by Lady Gaga & Beyoncé	Agneta Sjödin	OUT
2	Punk Papegojan	"Rim Tim Tagi Dim" by Baby Lasagna	undisclosed	SAFE
2	Punk Papegojan	"Careless Whisper" by George Michael	undisclosed	SAFE
3	Äggen	"En helt ny värld (A Whole New World)" from Aladdin	undisclosed	SAFE
3	Äggen	"Macarena" by Los Del Río	undisclosed	SAFE
4	Gräsklipparen	"Azizam" by Ed Sheeran	undisclosed	WIN
4	Gräsklipparen	"Don't You Worry Child" by Swedish House Mafia	undisclosed	WIN

=== Week 6 (1 May) ===
Performances on the sixth episode
#	Stage name	Song	Identity	Result
1	Knasbollen	"On the Floor" by Jennifer Lopez and Pitbull	Anna Book	OUT
1	Knasbollen	"Fantasi" by Freestyle	Anna Book	OUT
2	Stekaren	"Elektrisk" by Marcus & Martinus	undisclosed	SAFE
2	Stekaren	"Canelloni, Macaroni" by Lasse Holm	undisclosed	SAFE
3	Karate-Katten	"Honey Boy" by Benjamin Ingrosso	undisclosed	SAFE
3	Karate-Katten	"Sway" by Michael Bublé	undisclosed	SAFE
4	Sheriffen	"California Dreamin'" by The Mamas & the Papas	undisclosed	WIN
4	Sheriffen	"Trouble" by Elvis Presley	undisclosed	WIN

=== Week 7 (8 May) ===
Performances on the seventh episode
#	Stage name	Song	Identity	Result
1	Gräsklipparen	"So What" by P!nk	undisclosed	RISK
2	Sheriffen	"Wasted Love" by JJ	undisclosed	WIN
3	Äggen	"Pinne for landet" by Freddy Kalas	undisclosed	WIN
4	Punk Papegojan	"Let It Go" by Idina Menzel	undisclosed	RISK
5	Stekaren	"I'm Too Sexy" by Right Said Fred	Stefan Holm	OUT
6	Karate-Katten	"A Sky Full of Stars" by Coldplay	undisclosed	WIN

=== Week 8 (15 May) ===
Performances on the eighth episode
#	Stage name	Song	Duet Partner	Identity	Result
1	Punk Papegojan	"Don't You Worry 'bout a Thing" by Stevie Wonder	Felicia	undisclosed	RISK
2	Sheriffen	"Lost and found" by Molly Sandén and Victor Leksell	Edvin Törnblom	undisclosed	WIN
3	Karate-Katten	"Houdini by Eminem	Liamoo	undisclosed	RISK
4	Gräsklipparen	"Sweet n' Psycho" by Scarlet	Scarlet	undisclosed	SAFE
5	Äggen	"Eloise" by Arvingarna	Arvingarna	Alexander Pärleros	OUT
5	Äggen	"Eloise" by Arvingarna	Arvingarna	Ida Warg	OUT
Face-off details				Identity	Result
1	Punk Papegojan	"Banan Melon Kiwi & Citron" by Hooja		undisclosed	SAFE
2	Karate-Katten	"Gangnam Style" by PSY		Kim Sulocki	OUT

=== Week 9 (22 May) ===
- Group number: "Don't Stop Me Now" by Queen with Lisa Ajax

Performances on the ninth episode
#	Stage name	Song	Identity	Result
1	Punk Papegojan	"Like a Prayer" by Madonna	undisclosed	SAFE
2	Sheriffen	"Where Is My Husband!" by Raye	undisclosed	SAFE
3	Gräsklipparen	"Survivor" by Destiny's Child	Caroline Seger	THIRD
Final Face-off details			Identity	Result
1	Punk Papegojan	"I Have Nothing" by Whitney Houston/"Golden" by Huntrix/"Rim Tim Tagi Dim" by Baby Lasagna	John Lundvik	WINNER
2	Sheriffen	"California Dreamin'" by Sia/"Addicted to You" by Avicii/"Take On Me" by A-ha	Emil Henrohn	RUNNER-UP
