= Shuffle (disambiguation) =

Shuffling is a procedure used to randomize a deck of playing cards.

Shuffle, shuffles, or shuffling may also refer to:

== Arts, entertainment, and media ==
=== Dance ===
- Shuffle (tap dance), a type of footwork in tap dance
- Chassé, a dance step in several types of dance, is sometimes called a shuffle in line dancing
- Melbourne shuffle, a rave dance originating from Melbourne, Australia
- Shuffle step, a type of footwork in ballroom dance

=== Music ===
- Shuffle (album), a 2009 album by Machinefabriek
- "Shuffle" (song), a 2011 song by Bombay Bicycle Club
- "Shuffla", a 2018 song by Swedish duo Samir & Viktor
- Shuffle note, also called swing note; and the shuffle rhythm played with these notes
- Shuffle play, the randomization of a playlist on a music playing device

=== Other uses ===
- Shuffle!, a 2004 video game and its corresponding anime
- Shuffle (dominoes), to mix the tiles in dominoes

== Mathematics ==
- Shuffle algebra, a Hopf algebra with a basis corresponding to words on some set whose product is given by the shuffle product XшY of two words X, Y: the sum of all ways of interlacing them
- Shuffle product, the shuffle product of words of lengths m and n is a sum over the (m+n)!/m!n! ways of interleaving the two words

== Other uses ==
- iPod Shuffle, a portable MP3 player that has no screen and is marketed by Apple Inc.
- Shuffles by Pinterest, a social media platform by Pinterest
