= Masked Singer Sverige season 1 =

Masked Singer Sverige
- Season 1
- No. of episodes: 9

Release
- Original network: TV4
- Original release: March 26 – May 21, 2021

Season chronology
- Next → Season 2

The first season of Swedish Masked Singer started on 26 March 2021 on TV4 and ended on 21 May 2021. The presenter is David Hellenius while the panel consists of Nour El Refai, Felix Herngren, Pernilla Wahlgren and Måns Zelmerlöw, who every week will get to guess who the secret celebrity singer is.

== Contestants ==
Stage Name	Identity	Occupation	Episodes								
Stage Name	Identity	Occupation	1	2	3	4	5	6	7	8	9
Godisautomaten "Gumball Machine"	Daniel Norberg	Singer	WIN		SAFE		WIN		WIN	WIN	WINNER
Voodoodockan "Voodoo Doll"	Hans Rosenfeldt	Screenwriter		WIN		SAFE		SAFE	RISK	RISK	RUNNER-UP
Enhörningen "Unicorn"	Ellen Bergström	Singer	WIN		SAFE		RISK		WIN	RISK	THIRD
Sjöbjörnen "Sea Bear"	Anders Bagge	Songwriter	WIN		SAFE		SAFE		WIN	OUT	
Draken "Dragon"	Johanna Nordström	Comedienne		RISK		SAFE		WIN	RISK	OUT	
Korpen "Raven"	Robert Wells	Composer		WIN		SAFE		RISK	OUT		
Roboten "Robot"	Nassim Al Fakir	Musician		RISK		RISK		OUT			
Monstret "Monster"	Kikki Danielsson	Artist	RISK		RISK		OUT				
Isvargen "Ice Wolf"	Victoria Silvstedt	Supermodel		WIN		OUT					
Jokern "Joker"	Lotta Schelin	Former footballer	RISK		OUT						
Fåret "Sheep"	Christina Schollin	Actress		OUT							
Pingvinen "Penguin"	Sven Melander	Comedian	OUT								
Myskoxen "Musk Ox"	David Hellenius (special opening performance)	Comedian									

== Episodes ==
=== Week 1 (26 March) ===
Performances on the first episode
#	Stage name	Song	Result	
1	Godisautomaten	"Candyman" by Christina Aguilera	WIN	
2	Jokern	"Goliat" by Laleh	RISK	
3	Enhörningen	"Dance Monkey" by Tones & I	WIN	
4	Monstret	"On the Floor" by Jennifer Lopez ft. Pitbull	RISK	
5	Sjöbjörnen	"You Are the Reason" by Calum Scott	WIN	
6	Pingvinen	"There's No Business Like Show Business" by Frank Sinatra	RISK	
Face-off details			Identity	Result
1	Pingvinen	"Volare" by Gipsy Kings	Sven Melander	OUT
2	Jokern	"I'm Still Standing" by Elton John	undisclosed	SAFE

=== Week 2 (2 April) ===
Performances on the second episode
#	Stage name	Song	Result	
1	Draken	"Bang Bang" by Jessie J, Ariana Grande, & Nicki Minaj	RISK	
2	Korpen	"The Phantom of the Opera" by Andrew Lloyd Webber	WIN	
3	Roboten	"Cobrastyle" by Teddybears	RISK	
4	Isvargen	"When We Dig for Gold in the USA" by GES	WIN	
5	Fåret	"Sparkling Diamonds" by Nicole Kidman	RISK	
6	Voodoodockan	"I Love It" by Icona Pop ft. Charli XCX	WIN	
Face-off details			Identity	Result
1	Fåret	"I Can Jive" by Jerry Williams	Christina Schollin	OUT
2	Roboten	"Tainted Love" by Soft Cell	undisclosed	SAFE

=== Week 3 (9 April) ===
Performances on the third episode
#	Stage name	Song	Result	
1	Sjöbjörnen	"Don't You Worry 'bout a Thing" by Tori Kelly	SAFE	
2	Monstret	"Bad Guy" by Billie Eilish	RISK	
3	Enhörningen	"Shake It Off" by Taylor Swift	SAFE	
4	Godisautomaten	"Stay with Me" by Sam Smith	SAFE	
5	Jokern	"Born This Way" by Lady Gaga	RISK	
Face-off details			Identity	Result
1	Monstret	"Poker Face" by Lady Gaga	undisclosed	SAFE
2	Jokern	"Get the Party Started" by Pink	Lotta Schelin	OUT

=== Week 4 (16 April) ===
Performances on the fourth episode
#	Stage name	Song	Result	
1	Voodoodockan	"Shut Up and Dance" by Walk the Moon	SAFE	
2	Roboten	"Sun is Shining" by Axwell & Ingrosso	RISK	
3	Isvargen	"I Kissed a Girl" by Katy Perry	RISK	
4	Draken	"Du Måste Finnas" by Helen Sjöholm	SAFE	
5	Korpen	"Lose Yourself" by Eminem	SAFE	
Face-off details			Identity	Result
1	Isvargen	"Eye of the Tiger" by Survivor	Victoria Silvstedt	OUT
2	Roboten	"La Copa de la Vida" by Ricky Martin	undisclosed	SAFE

=== Week 5 (23 April) ===
Performances on the fifth episode
#	Stage name	Song	Result	
1	Enhörningen	"Snacket på stan" by Danny Saucedo	RISK	
2	Godisautomaten	"Castle on the Hill" by Ed Sheeran	SAFE	
3	Sjöbjörnen	"All by Myself" by Celine Dion	SAFE	
4	Monstret	"You Give Love a Bad Name" by Bon Jovi	RISK	
Winner Face-off details			Results	
1	Godisautomaten	"A Little Less Conversation" by Elvis Presley	WIN	
2	Sjöbjörnen	"Happy" by Pharrell Williams	SAFE	
Face-off details			Identity	Result
1	Enhörningen	"Lush Life" by Zara Larsson	undisclosed	SAFE
2	Monstret	"Fingers Crossed" by Agnes	Kikki Danielsson	OUT

=== Week 6 (30 April) ===
Performances on the sixth episode
#	Stage name	Song	Result	
1	Korpen	"Blinding Lights" by The Weeknd	RISK	
2	Draken	"Passa dig" by Miriam Bryant	SAFE	
3	Voodoodockan	"Ashes to Ashes" by Anna Bergendahl	SAFE	
4	Roboten	"Umbrella" by Rihanna	RISK	
Winner Face-off details			Results	
1	Draken	"Addicted to You" by Avicii	WIN	
2	Voodoodockan	"Vintersaga" by Amanda Bergman	SAFE	
Face-off details			Identity	Result
1	Korpen	"Vingar" by Mikael Rickfors	undisclosed	SAFE
2	Roboten	"Helt seriöst" by Kaliffa	Nassim Al Fakir	OUT

=== Week 7 (7 May) ===
Performances on the seventh episode
#	Stage name	Song	Result	
1	Godisautomaten	"Cake by the Ocean" by DNCE	WIN	
2	Voodoodockan	"Natteravn" by Rasmus Seebach	RISK	
3	Enhörningen	"Lev Nu Dö Sen" by Miss Li	WIN	
4	Korpen	"Viva la Vida" by Coldplay	RISK	
5	Draken	"It Takes a Fool to Remain Sane" by The Ark	RISK	
6	Sjöbjörnen	"September" by Earth, Wind & Fire	WIN	
Face-off details			Identity	Result
1	Korpen	"Poison" by Alice Cooper	Robert Wells	OUT
2	Draken	"Master Blaster (Jammin')" by Stevie Wonder	undisclosed	SAFE

=== Week 8 (14 May) ===
- Group number: "Wannabe" by Spice Girls (Enhörningen), "Who Let the Dogs Out" by Baha Men (Sjöbjörnen), "Good Vibrations" by Marky Mark and the Funky Bunch (Draken), "Gangnam Style" by PSY (Voodoodockan), "Hey Baby (Drop It to the Floor)" by Pitbull (Godisautomaten), "Party Rock Anthem" by LMFAO ft. Laura Bennett & GoonRock (Final 5 and Myskoxen)

Performances on the eighth episode
#	Stage name	Song	Identity	Result
1	Voodoodockan	"Waka Waka (This Time for Africa)" by Shakira ft. Freshlyground	undisclosed	RISK
2	Draken	"Mamma Knows Best" by Jessie J	Johanna Nordström	OUT
3	Godisautomaten	"En stund på jorden" by Laleh	undisclosed	WIN
4	Sjöbjörnen	"Without You" by David Guetta ft. Usher	undisclosed	RISK
5	Enhörningen	"Sax" by Fleur East	undisclosed	RISK
Face-off details			Identity	Result
1	Voodoodockan	"Don't Stop Me Now" by Queen	undisclosed	SAFE
2	Sjöbjörnen	"Roar" by Katy Perry	Anders Bagge	OUT

=== Week 9 (21 May) - Final ===
- Group number: "Faith" by Stevie Wonder feat. Ariana Grande

Performances on the ninth episode
#	Stage name	Song	Identity	Result
1	Godisautomaten	"Hey Look Ma, I Made It" by Panic! at the Disco	undisclosed	SAFE
2	Enhörningen	"Tik Tok" by Kesha	Ellen Bergström	THIRD
3	Voodoodockan	"Everybody (Backstreet's Back)" by Backstreet Boys	undisclosed	SAFE
Final Face-off details			Identity	Result
1	Voodoodockan	"Natteravn" by Rasmus Seebach/"Vintersaga" by Amanda Bergman/"I Love It" by Icona Pop feat. Charli XCX	Hans Rosenfeldt	RUNNER-UP
2	Godisautomaten	"A Little Less Conversation" by Elvis Presley/"Cake by the Ocean" by DNCE/"Candyman" by Christina Aguilera	Daniel Norberg	WINNER
