= Sven Melander =

Swedish journalist and entertainer (1947–2022)

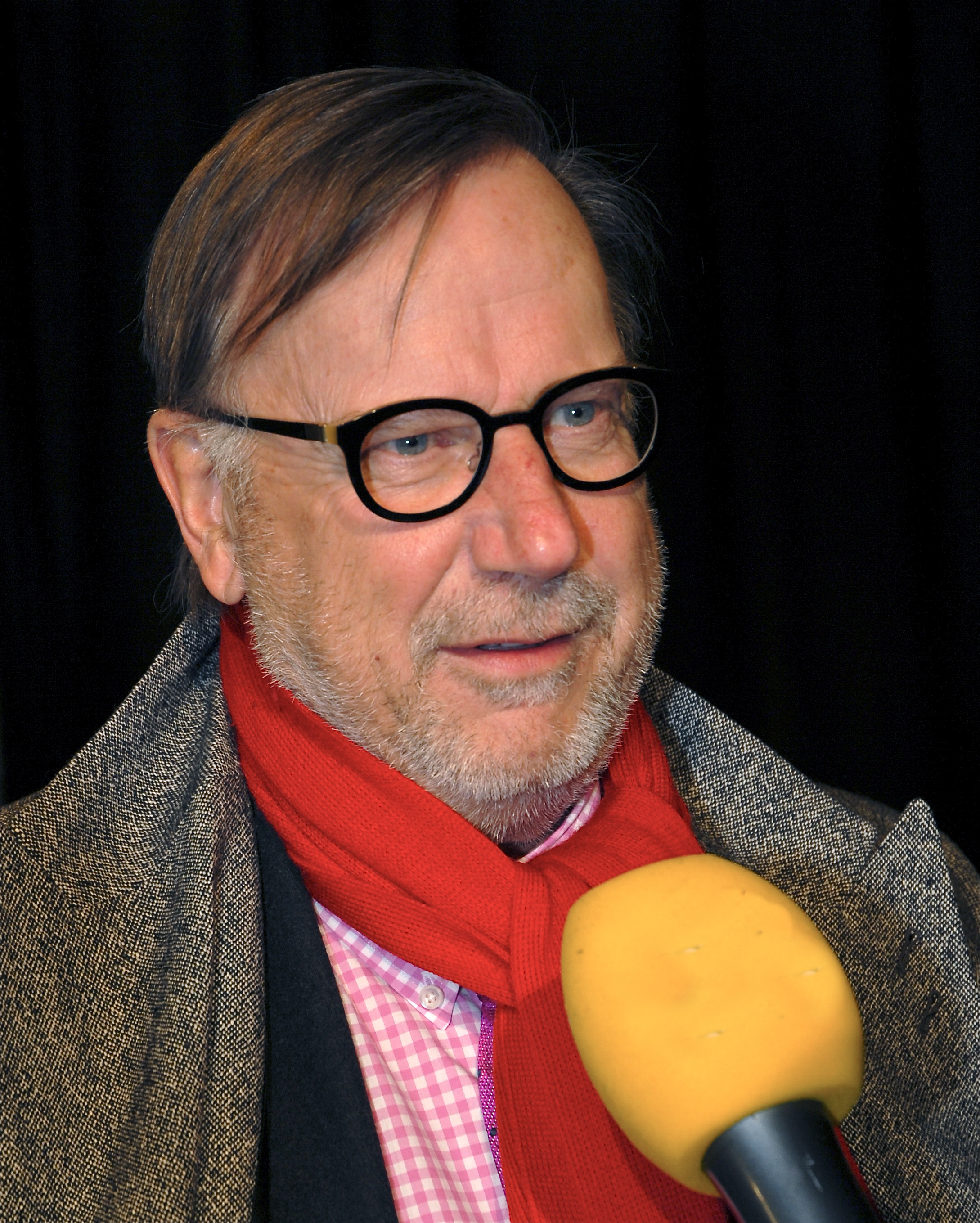
- Melander in 2012
- Born: Sven Alarik Melander; 30 October 1947; Malmö, Sweden
- Died: 31 March 2022 (aged 74)
- Occupations: Journalist, TV host, actor
- Years active: 1970–2022
- Spouse: Karin Melander Hassler (divorced)
- Children: 3
- Website: www.svenmelander.se

Sven Alarik Melander (30 October 1947 – 31 March 2022) was a Swedish journalist, comedian, television presenter, and actor. He hosted multiple shows for SVT, acted in films and theater, and co-presented the 1994 Melodifestivalen competition.

== Early life ==
Melander grew up in Malmö with his parents, Alrik Melander (1907–1977) and Alice Melander (née Mattsson; 1911–1986). By 1965, Melander was part of the Malmö FF ice hockey team, which won the SDS-Pucken competition of that year. Two of his teammates were future national-team footballers Staffan Tapper and Roy Andersson. During his high school years, he befriended musician Björn Afzelius. In 1967, both Melander and Afzelius were part of a hootenanny band called Lille Mats.

Melander studied engineering, but after graduation, he soon became interested in journalism and attended the School of Journalism in Gothenburg. In 1970, Melander interned at the newspaper Expressen in Malmö, and after graduating in 1971, he found a substitute job at the newspaper. After his period at the newspaper ended, he obtained a full-time job at the newspaper Aftonbladet. Between working at the newspapers, he worked for Radio Stockholm and also filmed his first big movie role.

== Career ==
=== Film and television ===
In the early 1980s, Melander established himself as a comedian and entertainer, starting with the role of Berra in Lasse Åberg's film Sällskapsresan in 1980. Along with Åke Cato, Melander wrote sketches and scripts for the SVT shows Häpnadsväktarna (in 1981) and Vitsuellt.

Along with Stina Lundberg Dabrowski, he was the television presenter for the SVT entertainment and comedy show Nöjesmaskinen between 1982 and 1984. In 1985, Melander presented the show Nöjesmassakern along with Gösta Engström, Jon Skolmen, and Åke Cato; some of his most well known comedy sketches originated from that show, including "Werner och Werner" and "Trollet Rulle". Between 1986 and 1989, Melander worked for SVT as the CEO of entertainment programmes. In 1991, he presented another comedy and entertainment show for SVT called Tack för kaffet.

Melander co-presented Melodifestivalen 1994 with Kattis Ahlström. For several years, Melander presented the show Upp till bevis on SVT, and sports shows on TV4, such as the horse-racing show Vinnare. In 2019, he was given an award for his work in television at the Kristallen-gala. In 2018, he took part in Stjärnorna på slottet, on which he shared his life's story.

In 2021, he participated in Masked Singer Sverige, singing in its first season which was broadcast on TV4.

=== Theater ===
Along with Åke Cato, Melander acted in the show En rökare på Tobaksbolaget in Malmö in 1991. Along with Eva Rydberg, he acted in the comedy play Allo Allo Emliga armén and in Lilla fransyskan at the Palladium in Malmö. He also acted in Eva Rydberg's production of Hemvärnets glada dagar at Fredriksdalsteatern in Helsingborg in 2005. Between 2007 and 2008, he acted in the play Little Shop of Horrors in Halmstad. He also appeared in the revue Två bröder emellan.

In 2016, Melander returned to the role of Berra in the musical version of Sällskapsresan at Nöjesteatern in Malmö and Chinateatern in Stockholm. He also worked as a translator of scripts, including translation of Ray Cooney's revues Hotelliggaren, Det stannar i familjen, and Kuta och kör.

== Death ==
Melander died of esophageal cancer at the age of 74 on 31 March 2022.
