= Masked Singer Sverige season 2 =

Masked Singer Sverige
- Season 2

Release
- Original network: TV4
- Original release: March 25 – May 20, 2022

Season chronology
- ← Previous; Season 1 Next → Season 3

The second season of the Swedish version of Masked Singer started on 25 March 2022 on TV4. David Hellenius returns as presenter of the show while Nour El Refai, Felix Herngren, Pernilla Wahlgren and Måns Zelmerlöw all return as jury.

== Contestants ==
Stage Name	Identity	Occupation	Episode								
Stage Name	Identity	Occupation	1	2	3	4	5	6	7	8	9
Spelmannen "Fiddler"	Marcus & Martinus	Pop duo	WIN		SAFE		WIN		WIN	RISK	WINNERS
Sagoträdet "Fairytale Tree"	Tareq Taylor	Chef		WIN		SAFE		SAFE	RISK	RISK	RUNNER-UP
Trollkarlen "Wizard"	Rennie Mirro	Dancer	WIN		SAFE		RISK		WIN	WIN	THIRD
Sjöjungfrun "Mermaid"	Yohio	Singer		RISK		SAFE		RISK	WIN	OUT	
Mjukglassen "Ice Cream"	Arantxa Alvarez	Presenter		RISK		RISK		WIN	RISK	OUT	
Cyberninjan "Cyberninja"	Clara Henry	Actress	WIN		SAFE		SAFE		OUT		
Lokatten "Lynx"	Malin Berghagen	Actress		WIN		SAFE		OUT			
Riddaren "Knight"	Peter Magnusson	Comedian	RISK		RISK		OUT				
Astronauten "Astronaut"	Lasse Holm	Songwriter		WIN		OUT					
Fru Kanin "Mrs. Rabbit"	Mona Sahlin	Politician	RISK		OUT						
Nallen "Teddy Bear"	Marianne Mörck	Actress		OUT							
Karusellen "Carousel"	Anna Lindberg	Former diver	OUT								
Bläckfisken "Octopus"	Amadeus Sögaard	Football player									

== Episodes ==
=== Week 1 (25 March) ===
Performances on the first episode
#	Stage name	Song	Result	
1	Trollkarlen	"Believer" by Imagine Dragons	WIN	
2	Riddaren	"My Way (A Mi Manera)" by Robin Williams	RISK	
3	Cyberninjan	"Good 4 U" by Olivia Rodrigo	WIN	
4	Fru Kanin	"Old Town Road" by Lil Nas X	RISK	
5	Karusellen	"Circus" by Britney Spears	RISK	
6	Spelmannen	"Thinking Out Loud" by Ed Sheeran	WIN	
Face-off details			Identity	Result
1	Fru Kanin	"Flytta på dej!" by Alina Devecerski	undisclosed	SAFE
2	Karusellen	"Jump Around" by House of Pain	Anna Lindberg	OUT

=== Week 2 (1 April) ===
Performances on the second episode
#	Stage name	Song	Result	
1	Nallen	"It's the Hard Knock Life" from Annie	RISK	
2	Sagoträdet	"What a Wonderful World" by Louis Armstrong	WIN	
3	Mjukglassen	"Ain't My Fault" by Zara Larsson	RISK	
4	Astronauten	"Livin' la Vida Loca" by Ricky Martin	WIN	
5	Sjöjungfrun	"Stone Cold" by Demi Lovato	RISK	
6	Lokatten	"Mikrofonkåt" by Petra Marklund	WIN	
Face-off details			Identity	Result
1	Nallen	"Personal Jesus" by Depeche Mode	Marianne Mörck	OUT
2	Mjukglassen	"Blow Your Mind (Mwah)" by Dua Lipa	undisclosed	SAFE

=== Week 3 (8 April) ===
Performances on the third episode
#	Stage name	Song	Result	
1	Spelmannen	"Prisoner" by Miley Cyrus feat. Dua Lipa	SAFE	
2	Fru Kanin	"MAMMAMIA" by Måneskin	RISK	
3	Cyberninjan	"Lay All Your Love on Me" by ABBA	SAFE	
4	Riddaren	"My Heart Will Go On" by Celine Dion	RISK	
5	Trollkarlen	"Beggin'" by The Four Seasons	SAFE	
Face-off details			Identity	Result
1	Fru Kanin	"Fight for Your Right" by Beastie Boys	Mona Sahlin	OUT
2	Riddaren	"SexyBack" by Justin Timberlake	undisclosed	SAFE

=== Week 4 (15 April) ===
Performances on the fourth episode
#	Stage name	Song	Result	
1	Mjukglassen	"Don't Start Now" by Dua Lipa	RISK	
2	Astronauten	"It's Gonna Be Me" by NSYNC	RISK	
3	Sagoträdet	"Shivers" by Ed Sheeran	SAFE	
4	Lokatten	"Cover Me in Sunshine" by Pink & Willow Sage Hart	SAFE	
5	Sjöjungfrun	"Don't Call Me Up" by Mabel	SAFE	
Face-off details			Identity	Result
1	Mjukglassen	"Runaway Baby" by Bruno Mars	undisclosed	SAFE
2	Astronauten	"Who Let the Dogs Out" by Baha Men	Lasse Holm	OUT

=== Week 5 (22 April) ===
Performances on the fifth episode
#	Stage name	Song	Result	
1	Riddaren	"Slå dig fri" by Annika Herlitz	RISK	
2	Spelmannen	"Ain't No Other Man" by Christina Aguilera	SAFE	
3	Trollkarlen	"Hello" by Adele	RISK	
4	Cyberninjan	"Levitating" by Dua Lipa	SAFE	
Winner Face-off details			Result	
1	Spelmannen	"Sucker" by Jonas Brothers	WIN	
2	Cyberninjan	"Call Your Girlfriend" by Robyn	SAFE	
Face-off details			Identity	Result
1	Riddaren	"Jag kommer" by Veronica Maggio	Peter Magnusson	OUT
2	Trollkarlen	"24K Magic" by Bruno Mars	undisclosed	SAFE

=== Week 6 (29 April) ===
Performances on the sixth episode
#	Stage name	Song	Result	
1	Sjöjungfrun	"The Greatest Show" by Hugh Jackman	RISK	
2	Sagoträdet	"Come Together" by Gary Clark Jr.	SAFE	
3	Mjukglassen	"Boys" by Lizzo	SAFE	
4	Lokatten	"Bad Habits" by Ed Sheeran	RISK	
Winner Face-off details			Result	
1	Sagoträdet	"Can't Stay Away" by Darin	SAFE	
2	Mjukglassen	"Tänd alla ljus" by Benjamin Ingrosso	WIN	
Face-off details			Identity	Result
1	Sjöjungfrun	"I Have Nothing" by Whitney Houston	undisclosed	SAFE
2	Lokatten	"Express Yourself" by Madonna	Malin Berghagen	OUT

=== Week 7 (6 May) ===
Performances on the seventh episode
#	Stage name	Song	Result	
1	Mjukglassen	"Bootylicious" by Destiny's Child	RISK	
2	Trollkarlen	"There's Nothing Holdin' Me Back" by Shawn Mendes	WIN	
3	Sjöjungfrun	"Step Up" by Darin	WIN	
4	Cyberninjan	"Fighter" by Christina Aguilera	RISK	
5	Spelmannen	"Wicked Game" by Chris Isaak	WIN	
6	Sagoträdet	"Kings & Queens" by Ava Max	RISK	
Face-off details			Identity	Result
1	Cyberninjan	"Living in America" by The Sounds	Clara Henry	OUT
2	Sagoträdet	"Yeah!" by Usher	undisclosed	SAFE

=== Week 8 (14 May) ===
- Guest Performance: "Stay" by The Kid Laroi as performed by Amadeus Sögaard as Bläckfisken

Performances on the eighth episode
#	Stage name	Song	Identity	Result
1	Mjukglassen	"Freestyler" by Bomfunk MC's	Arantxa Alvarez	OUT
2	Sagoträdet	"Heroes" by Måns Zelmerlöw	undisclosed	RISK
3	Trollkarlen	"Creep" by Radiohead	undisclosed	WIN
4	Spelmannen	"Treasure" by Bruno Mars	undisclosed	RISK
5	Sjöjungfrun	"Avundsjuk" by Nanne Grönvall	undisclosed	RISK
Face-off details			Identity	Result
1	Spelmannen	"It's a Man's Man's Man's World" by James Brown	undisclosed	SAFE
2	Sjöjungfrun	"Puttin' on the Ritz" by Robbie Williams	Yohio	OUT

=== Week 9 (20 May) – Final ===
- Group number: "The Nights" by Avicii (Spelmannen), "Move Your Feet" by Junior Senior (Trollkarlen), "Survivor" by Destiny's Child (Sagoträdet), "Made Of" by Nause (Final 3)

Performances on the ninth episode
#	Stage name	Song	Identity	Result
1	Spelmannen	"Rock Your Body" by Justin Timberlake	undisclosed	SAFE
2	Trollkarlen	"Bossa Nova Baby" by Elvis Presley	Rennie Mirro	THIRD
3	Sagoträdet	"Break Free" by Ariana Grande feat. Zedd	undisclosed	SAFE
Final Face-off details			Identity	Result
1	Spelmannen	"Sucker" by Jonas Brothers/"Wicked Game" by Chris Isaak/"Ain't No Other Man" by Christina Aguilera	Marcus & Martinus	WINNERS
2	Sagoträdet	"Shivers" by Ed Sheeran/"Come Together" by Gary Clark Jr./"Kings & Queens" by Ava Max	Tareq Taylor	RUNNER-UP
