= Margaux Dietz =

Swedish television personality and blogger

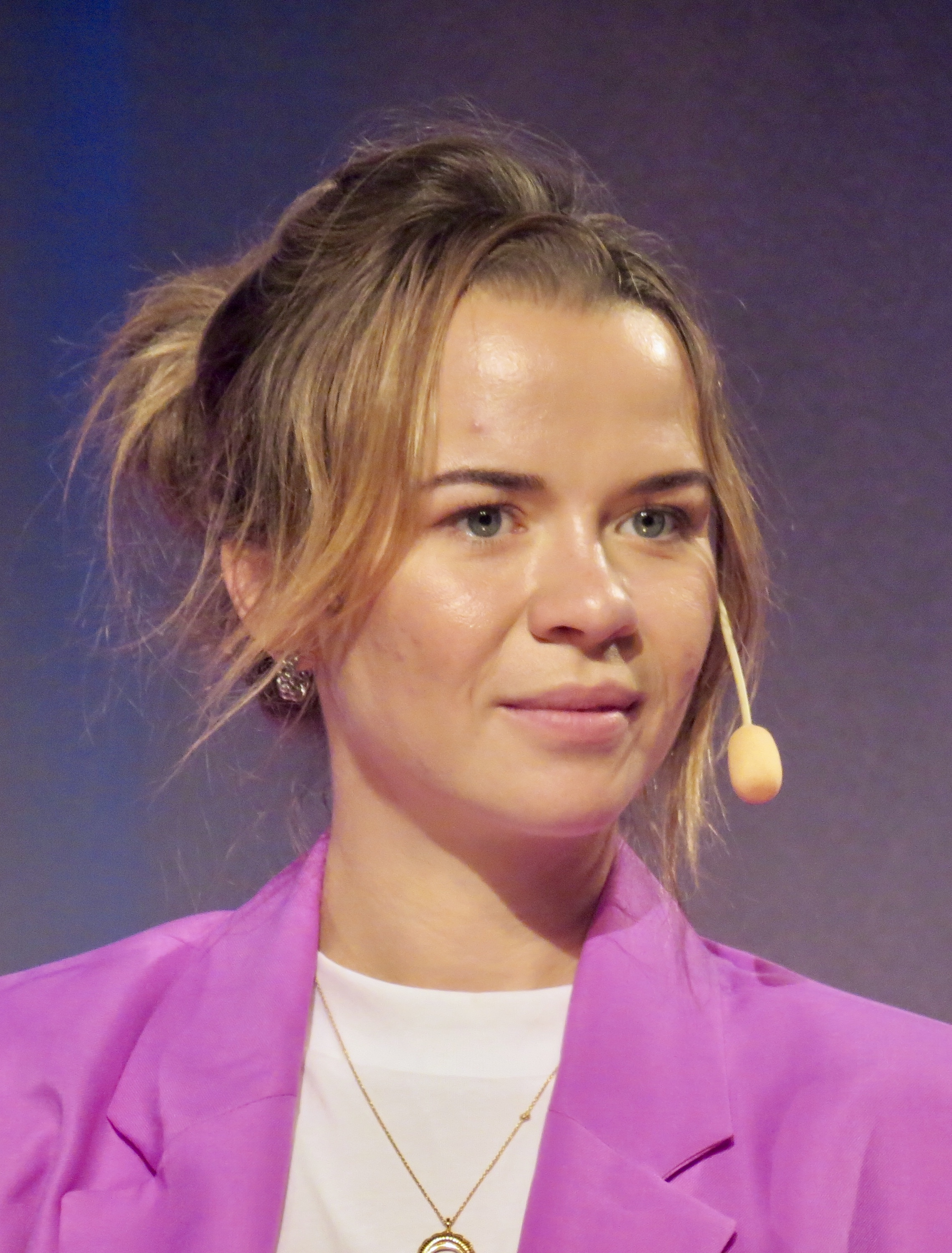
- Margaux Dietz in 2019
- Born: 26 September 1990 (age 35); Gothenburg, Sweden
- Occupation(s): Television presenter, influencer, blogger

Margaux Stéphanie Persson Dietz (born 25 September 1990) is a Swedish blogger, television personality, and television presenter. She is best known as a former celebrity dancer in Let's Dance, presenting the dating show Hemliga beundrare (Secret admirers), and presenting the political YouTube channel "Partitempen".

== Biography ==
Dietz grew up in Saltsjöbaden. In 2017, she gave birth to a son with Jacob Liebermann. The couple got married and were ordained by the Christian Democratic leader and friend Ebba Busch, although the marriage was not legally valid. They separated in late 2019.

Since 2017 she is part of Splay Networks. In 2018, she received four nominations in the social media awards Guldtuben and won "Video of the Year" for her video covering the birth of her child. In the same year she won the award for Influencer of the Year at the Elle gala.

Dietz was one of the celebrity dancers on Let's Dance 2018 broadcast on TV4; her dance partner was Alexander Svanberg. In 2019, she became the television presenter of the dating show Hemliga beundrare which is broadcast on TV3.

In 2018, Margaux Dietz started the YouTube channel "Partitempen" (lit. 'the party temperature') where she interviewed all the Swedish party leaders ahead of that year's election. She wanted to get younger people more engaged with the politics. The idea for the videos occurred to her when meeting leader Ebba Busch Thor who told her about the difficulties of reaching over 400,000 young voters that would be able to vote for the first time in 2018.

Partitempen operated differently to normal TV interviews for the party leaders. In the interviews all the party leaders could voice their opinions about current events.

In October 2022, Dietz filmed and published a video of herself and her son encountering a visibly injured and passed out man outside her apartment, attempting to portray the situation as comical. Several brands distanced themselves from Dietz and withdrew their sponsorships.

== Bibliography ==
- Your best life (2019, Bookmark, ISBN 9789188859761)
