= Masked Singer Sverige season 3 =

Masked Singer Sverige
- Season 3

Release
- Original network: TV4
- Original release: 31 March – 26 May 2023

Season chronology
- ← Previous; Season 2 Next → Season 4

The third season of the Swedish version of Masked Singer started on 31 March 2023 on TV4. David Hellenius returns as presenter of the show while Nour El Refai, Felix Herngren, Pernilla Wahlgren and Måns Zelmerlöw all returned as jury.

== Contestants ==
Stage Name	Identity	Occupation	Episode								
Stage Name	Identity	Occupation	1	2	3	4	5	6	7	8	9
Karamellen "Caramel"	Klara Hammarström	Singer	WIN		SAFE		WIN		WIN	WIN	WINNER
Maneten "Jellyfish"	Edvin Törnblom	Actor		WIN		SAFE		WIN	RISK	RISK	RUNNER-UP
Magiska Boken "Magic Book"	Vanna Rosenberg	Singer	RISK		SAFE		SAFE		WIN	RISK	THIRD
Kungen "King"	André Myhrer	Former alpine skier		WIN		SAFE		SAFE	WIN	OUT	
Vikingen "Viking"	Ciara Janson	Actress		RISK		SAFE		RISK	RISK	OUT	
T-Rex & Forskaren "T-Rex and Scientist"	Fredrik Hallgren	Actor	RISK		RISK		RISK		OUT		
Popcornet "Popcorn"	Elsa Billgren	TV presenter		WIN		RISK		OUT			
Fågelskrämman "Scarecrow"	Suzanne Reuter	Actress	WIN		SAFE		OUT				
Fjärilsfen "Butterfly Fairy"	Camilla Läckberg	Writer		RISK		OUT					
Superhjälten "Superhero"	Carolina Klüft	Former athlete	WIN		OUT						
Mullvaden "Mole"	Janne Andersson	Football coach		OUT							
Skrothögen "Scrap Heap"	Joakim Lundell	YouTuber	OUT								

== Episodes ==
=== Week 1 (31 March) ===
Performances on the first episode
#	Stage name	Song	Result	
1	Magiska Boken	"Instruktionsboken" by Miss Li	RISK	
2	Fågelskrämman	"I Put A Spell On You" by John Debney	WIN	
3	T-Rex & Forskaren	"Industry Baby" by Lil Nas X	RISK	
4	Superhjälten	"Hero" by Charlotte Perrelli	WIN	
5	Skrothögen	"Hiphopper" by Thomas Rusiak	RISK	
6	Karamellen	"Love On Top" by Beyoncé	WIN	
Face-off details			Identity	Result
1	T-Rex & Forskaren	"Vem e som oss" by Anis Don Demina	undisclosed	SAFE
2	Skrothögen	"Copacabanana" by Sean Banan	Joakim Lundell	OUT

=== Week 2 (7 April) ===
Performances on the second episode
#	Stage name	Song	Result	
1	Fjärilsfen	"Sweet But Psycho" by Ava Max	RISK	
2	Kungen	"Kung för en dag" by Magnus Uggla	WIN	
3	Maneten	"Oops!... I Did It Again" by Britney Spears	WIN	
4	Mullvaden	"Life" by E-Type	RISK	
5	Vikingen	"Enemy" by Imagine Dragons	RISK	
6	Popcornet	"A Little Party Never Killed Nobody (All We Got)" by Fergie	WIN	
Face-off details			Identity	Result
1	Fjärilsfen	"För Evigt" by Hanna Ferm	undisclosed	SAFE
2	Mullvaden	"I'm Too Sexy" by Right Said Fred	Janne Andersson	OUT

=== Week 3 (14 April) ===
Performances on the third episode
#	Stage name	Song	Result	
1	Karamellen	"Show Me How You Burlesque" by Christina Aguilera	SAFE	
2	T-Rex & Forskaren	"Hooked on a Feeling" by Blue Swede	RISK	
3	Fågelskrämman	"Bananas" by Malou Prytz	SAFE	
4	Superhjälten	"Det Kommer Bli Bra" by Laleh	RISK	
5	Magiska Boken	"Something Just Like This" by Coldplay	SAFE	
Face-off details			Identity	Result
1	T-Rex & Forskaren	"We're Not Gonna Take It" by Twisted Sister	undisclosed	SAFE
2	Superhjälten	"Run to the Hills" by Klara Hammarström	Carolina Klüft	OUT

=== Week 4 (21 April) ===
Performances on the fourth episode
#	Stage name	Song	Result	
1	Maneten	"Problem" by Ariana Grande	SAFE	
2	Popcornet	"It's Oh So Quiet" by Björk	RISK	
3	Fjärilsfen	"X" by Miss Li	RISK	
4	Vikingen	"When I Was Your Man" by Bruno Mars	SAFE	
5	Kungen	"Suspicious Minds" by Elvis Presley	SAFE	
Face-off details			Identity	Result
1	Popcornet	"Bailando" by Paradisio	undisclosed	SAFE
2	Fjärilsfen	"Walking on Sunshine" by Katrina and the Waves	Camilla Läckberg	OUT

=== Week 5 (28 April) ===
Performances on the fifth episode
#	Stage name	Song	Result	
1	Fågelskrämman	"Ease On down the Road" by Stephanie Mills	RISK	
2	Magiska Boken	"Mio min Mio" by Gemini	SAFE	
3	Karamellen	"Good As Hell" by Lizzo	SAFE	
4	T-Rex & Forskaren	"Två av oss" by X-Model	RISK	
Winner Face-off details			Result	
1	Magiska Boken	"ABC" by The Jackson 5	SAFE	
2	Karamellen	"Rosa Himmel" by Jonathan Johansson	WIN	
Face-off details			Identity	Result
1	Fågelskrämman	"Händerna mot himlen" by Petra Marklund	Suzanne Reuter	OUT
2	T-Rex & Forskaren	"Bluffin" by LIAMOO	undisclosed	SAFE

=== Week 6 (5 May) ===
Performances on the sixth episode
#	Stage name	Song	Result	
1	Kungen	"Galway Girl" by Ed Sheeran	SAFE	
2	Maneten	"Dancing on My Own" by Calum Scott	SAFE	
3	Popcornet	"I Wanna Be Loved by You" by Marilyn Monroe	RISK	
4	Vikingen	"Mirrors" by Justin Timberlake	RISK	
Winner Face-off details			Result	
1	Kungen	"Din Tid Kommer" by Håkan Hellström	SAFE	
2	Maneten	"Rehab" by Amy Winehouse	WIN	
Face-off details			Identity	Result
1	Popcornet	"Wannabe" by Spice Girls	Elsa Billgren	OUT
2	Vikingen	"Piccadilly Circus" by Pernilla Wahlgren	undisclosed	SAFE

=== Week 7 (12 May) ===
Performances on the seventh episode
#	Stage name	Song	Result	
1	Karamellen	"New Rules" by Dua Lipa	WIN	
2	Vikingen	"Lips Are Movin'" by Meghan Trainor	RISK	
3	T-Rex & Forskaren	"Step by Step" by New Kids on the Block	RISK	
4	Kungen	"Allt det vackra" by Benjamin Ingrosso	WIN	
5	Maneten	"It's Raining Men" by The Weather Girls	RISK	
6	Magiska Boken	"Here Comes the Night" by Them	WIN	
Face-off details			Identity	Result
1	T-Rex & Forskaren	"Kom Igen Lena" by Håkan Hellström	Fredrik Hallgren	OUT
2	Maneten	"I Will Survive" by Gloria Gaynor / "Survivor" by Destiny's Child	undisclosed	SAFE

=== Week 8 (19 May) ===
Performances on the eighth episode
#	Stage name	Song	Duet Partner	Identity	Result
1	Kungen	"Runaway Baby" by Bruno Mars	Liamoo	undisclosed	RISK
2	Vikingen	"Flowers" by Miley Cyrus	Klara Hammarström	Ciara Janson	OUT
3	Maneten	"Syrener" by Olivia Lobato	Olivia Lobato	undisclosed	RISK
4	Karamellen	"Hot n Cold" by Katy Perry	Linda Bengtzing	undisclosed	WIN
5	Magiska Boken	"Beauty and the Beast" by Celine Dion	Tommy Körberg	undisclosed	RISK
Face-off details				Identity	Result
1	Kungen	"Let Me Entertain You" by Robbie Williams	N/A	André Myhrer	OUT
2	Magiska Boken	"ABCDEFU" by Gayle	N/A	undisclosed	SAFE

=== Week 9 (26 May) – Final ===
- Group number: "Beauty and a Beat" by Justin Bieber (Magiska Boken), "Dynamite" by Taio Cruz (Maneten), "My Universe" by Coldplay and BTS (Karamellen), "Without You" by Avicii (Final 3)

Performances on the ninth episode
#	Stage name	Song	Identity	Result
1	Magiska Boken	"The Edge of Glory" by Lady Gaga	Vanna Rosenberg	THIRD
2	Karamellen	"Everytime We Touch" by Cascada	undisclosed	SAFE
3	Maneten	"Crazy In Love" by Beyoncé feat. Jay-Z	undisclosed	SAFE
Final Face-off details			Identity	Result
1	Karamellen	"New Rules" by Dua Lipa/"Love On Top" by Beyoncé/"Show Me How You Burlesque" by Christina Aguilera	Klara Hammarström	WINNER
2	Maneten	"Problem" by Ariana Grande/"Rehab" by Amy Winehouse/"It's Raining Men" by The Weather Girls	Edvin Törnblom	RUNNER-UP
