= Magic Still Exists =

Studio album by Agnes
- Released: 22 October 2021
- Length: 35:01
- Label: Universal
- Producer: Vargas and Lagola

Agnes chronology
Nothing Can Compare (2019)	Magic Still Exists (2021)	Beautiful Madness (2026)

Singles from Magic Still Exists
- 1. "Fingers Crossed" Released: 21 August 2020; 2. "24 Hours" Released: 21 May 2021; 3. "Here Comes the Night" Released: 1 October 2021; 4. "Love and Appreciation" Released: 26 August 2022

Magic Still Exists is the fifth studio album by Swedish singer Agnes, released on 22 October 2021 through Universal Music Sweden. It was her first album in over nine years, and reached number nine in her home country of Sweden. Magic Still Exists received two nominations at the Swedish Grammis music awards.

== Critical reception ==
Michael Cragg of The Guardian called the album a "pop miracle" and a "soothing balm perfect for fleeting dancefloor moments". It was listed in The Guardian's top 50 albums of 2021, with journalist Laura Snapes relating the music to that of Lady Gaga, Donna Summer and Queen, whilst avoiding "pastiche on the strength of [the] songwriting".

== Track listing ==
All tracks produced by Vargas & Lagola.

Magic Still Exists track listing
No.	Title	Writer(s)	Length
1.	"Spiritual Awakening"	Agnes Carlsson; Vincent Pontare; Salem Al Fakir	1:12
2.	"XX"	Carlsson; Maria Hazell; Tobias Lutzenkirchen; Pontare; Al Fakir	4:02
3.	"24 Hours"	Carlsson; Hazell; Kerstin Ljungstrom; Pontare; Al Fakir	3:50
4.	"Freedom"	Carlsson; Pontare; Al Fakir	0:41
5.	"Here Comes the Night"	Carlsson; Hannah Wilson; Pontare; Al Fakir	3:32
6.	"Love and Appreciation"	Carlsson; Wilson; Pontare; Al Fakir	5:03
7.	"The Soul Has No Gender"	Carlsson; Pontare; Al Fakir	1:15
8.	"Selfmade"	Carlsson; Wilson; Pontare; Al Fakir	5:21
9.	"Fingers Crossed"	Carlsson; Pontare; Al Fakir	3:23
10.	"Free Your Mind and Free Your Body"	Carlsson; Pontare; Al Fakir	1:15
11.	"Magic Still Exists"	Carlsson; Wilson; Pontare; Al Fakir	5:22
Total length:			35:01

== Charts ==
Chart performance for Magic Still Exists
Chart (2021–2022)	Peak position
Swedish Albums (Sverigetopplistan)	7
Swedish Vinyl (Sverigetopplistan)	1
Swedish Physical (Sverigetopplistan)	6
UK Album Downloads (OCC)	73

== Release History ==
Country	Date	Format	Label
Various	22 October 2021	Digital Download, Streaming	Universal
Various	29 April 2022	LP	Universal
