= Let's Dance 2018 =

- Season 2018
- Celebrity winner: Jon Henrik Fjällgren
- Professional winner: Katja Luján Engelholm
- No. of episodes: 11

Release
- Original network: TV4
- Original release: 23 March – 1 June 2018

Season chronology
- ← Previous; Let's Dance 2017 Next → Let's Dance 2019

Let's Dance 2018 is the thirteenth season of the Swedish celebrity dancing TV series Let's Dance. The season premiered on TV4 on 23 March 2018. The show is presented by Tilde de Paula Eby and David Hellenius.

English dancer Aaron Brown from the UK version of Strictly Come Dancing competed for the first time.

== Couples ==
Celebrity	Known for	Professional	Status
Britt Ekland	Actress	Aaron Brown	Eliminated 1st on 30 March 2018
Nikki Amini	Music marketer	Tobias Karlsson	Eliminated 2nd on 6 April 2018
Claes Malmberg	Actor and comedian	Malin Watson	Eliminated 3rd on 13 April 2018
Gustaf Hammarsten	Actor	Jasmine Takács	Eliminated 4th on 20 April 2018
Martina Haag	actress and author	Tobias Bader	Eliminated 5th on 27 April 2018
Therese Alshammar	Olympic swimmer	Calle Sterner	Eliminated 6th on 4 May 2018
Viktor Frisk	Blogger and singer	Linn Hegdal	Eliminated 7th on 11 May 2018
Margaux Dietz	YouTuber	Alexander Svanberg	Eliminated 8th on 18 May 2018
Gunde Svan	Cross-country skier and racing driver	Jeanette Carlsson	Third Place on 25 May 2018
Daniel Norberg	YouTuber	Maria Zimmerman	Runners-up on 1 June 2018
Jon Henrik Fjällgren	Singer	Katja Luján Engelholm	Winners on 1 June 2018

== Scoring chart ==
Couple	Place	1	2	1+2	3	4	5	6	7	8	9		10	11
Jon Henrik & Katja	1	15	22	37	22	28	22	28+10=38	31+2=33	21+4=25	26	–	26+30=56	29+28+30=87
Daniel & Maria	2	13	12	25	15	23	20	29+12=41	30+12=42	26+12+38	30	–	29+29=58	30+29+30=89
Gunde & Jeanette	3	12	17	29	19	18	21	16+4=20	32+6=38	30+6=36	25	26	27+23=50	
Margaux & Alexander	4	9	19	28	21	20	25	16+14=30	35+10=45	28+8=36	27	30		
Viktor & Linn	5	8	9	17	14	14	20	13+6=19	23+8=31	16+10=26				
Therese & Calle	6	13	17	30	19	24	24	23+8=31	25+4=29					
Martina & Tobias	7	9	12	21	9	14	10	16+2=18						
Gustaf & Jasmine	8	18	17	35	14	23	18							
Claes & Malin	9	8	15	23	13	18								
Nikki & Tobias	10	15	13	28	16									
Britt & Aaron	11	10	7	17										

Red numbers indicate the lowest score of each week.
Green number indicate the highest score of each week.
indicates the couple that was eliminated that week.
indicates the couple received the lowest score of the week and were eliminated.
indicates the couple finished in the bottom two.
indicates the couple earned immunity from elimination.
indicates the winning couple.
indicates the runner-up couple.
indicates the third place couple.

=== Average chart ===
- Points awarded by guest judges and bonus points from dance marathons will not be included.

Rank by average	Place	Couple	Total points	Number of dances	Average
1	1	Jon Henrik & Katja	352	14	25.1
2	2	Daniel & Maria	338	14	24.1
3	4	Margaux & Alexander	222	10	22.2
4	3	Gunde & Jeanette	258	12	21.5
5	6	Therese & Calle	139	7	19.9
6	8	Gustaf & Jasmine	90	5	18.0
7	10	Nikki & Tobias	44	3	14.7
8	5	Viktor & Linn	111	8	13.9
9	9	Claes & Malin	54	4	13.5
10	7	Martina & Tobias	70	6	11.7
11	11	Britt & Aaron	17	2	8.5
