= 24 Hours (Agnes song) =

2021 single by Agnes

Single by Agnes

from the album Magic Still Exists
- Released: May 21, 2021
- Genre: Synth-pop; disco; nu-disco
- Length: 4:01
- Label: Senga · Universal Music
- Songwriter(s): Agnes Carlsson; Kerstin Ljungström; Maria Hazell; Salem Al Fakir; Vincent Pontare
- Producer(s): Vargas & Lagola

Agnes singles chronology
"Fingers Crossed" (2020)	"24 Hours" (2021)	"Here Comes The Night" (2021)

Music video
- "24 Hours" on YouTube

"24 Hours" is a song by Swedish singer Agnes serving as the second single from her fifth studio album Magic Still Exists. It was released on May 21, 2021, through Senga and Universal Music.

== Background ==
Agnes stated about the song: "24 Hours is about going through the fire and the pain. How your life is turned upside down. Something extreme had to happen for you to wake up and see everything clearly. It is a sliding door moment where you choose the path forward.". Simultaneously with the release of the music video, Agnes added: "When we need to process a dramatic change in our life, we go through different stages of emotion. The video for 24 hours [sic] is based on that journey, and the different personalities that it brings to light. All tailored to help us cope with everything from sadness and frustration to anger and grief. It’s not pretty, but without them we wouldn't be rewarded with the powerful energy that then helps us move forward."

"24 Hours" is the second single from Agnes' fifth studio album "Magic Still Exists", that has been released on October 22, 2021.

== Music video ==
A music video was released onto YouTube on July 2. The video was directed by SWIM CLUB, which also directed the music video for "Fingers Crossed".

The music video for "24 Hours" received a nomination in the category "Music Video of the Year" at the 2022 Grammi Awards, which will be held on May 19, 2022.

== Track listing ==
Digital single

1. "24 Hours" – 4:01

Remixes single

1. "24 Hours (feat. Andrelli)" (Andrelli Remix) – 2:48

The Circle° Sessions - Single

1. "24 Hours (The Circle° Sessions)" – 4:22
2. "Fingers Crossed (The Circle° Sessions)" – 3:23

== Credits ==
All credits retrieved from Discogs

- Vocals by Agnes
- Backing vocals by Maria Hazell
- Composed and written by Agnes, Kerstin Ljungström, Maria Hazell, Salem Al Fakir, Vincent Pontare
- Engineered by Colin Leonard, Heidi Wang, Josh Gudwin, Vargas & Lagola
- Mastered by Colin Leonard
- Mixed by Josh Gudwin, Heidi Wang
- Produced by Vargas & Lagola

== Charts ==
Chart performance for "24 Hours"
Chart (2021)	Peak position
Sweden Heatseeker (Sverigetopplistan)	12

== Release history ==
Release history for "24 Hours"
Region	Date	Format	Label
Various	21 May 2021	Digital download; streaming	Senga
