= Masked Singer Sverige =

Swedish television series

Masked Singer Sverige is the Swedish version of Masked Singer. The first season premiered on 26 March 2021 on TV4. The presenter of the show is David Hellenius. The expertpanel for the show consists of Nour El Refai, Felix Herngren, Pernilla Wahlgren and Måns Zelmerlöw, who every week will get to guess who the secret celebrity singer is.

A second season of the show began on 25 March 2022 and ended on 20 May 2022.

A third season of the show premiered on 31 March 2023.

A fourth season of the show premiered on 22 March 2024.

The fifth season of the show premiered on 28 March 2025.

The sixth season of the show premiered on 27 March 2026.

== Series overview ==
Series overview
Season	Celebrities	Episodes	Originally released		Winner	Runner-up	Third place
Season	Celebrities	Episodes	First released	Last released	Winner	Runner-up	Third place
1	12	9	March 26, 2021	May 21, 2021	Daniel Norberg as "Godisautomaten"	Hans Rosenfeldt as "Voodoodockan"	Ellen Bergström as "Enhörningen"
2	12	9	March 25, 2022	May 20, 2022	Marcus & Martinus as "Spelmannen"	Tareq Taylor as "Sagoträdet"	Rennie Mirro as "Trollkarlen"
3	12	9	March 31, 2023	May 26, 2023	Klara Hammarström as "Karamellen"	Edvin Törnblom as "Maneten"	Vanna Rosenberg as "Magiska Boken"
4	12	9	March 22, 2024	May 17, 2024	Fröken Snusk as "Kameleonten"	Markoolio as "Pandorna"	Hanna Ardéhn as "Skelettet"
5	12	9	March 28, 2025	May 23, 2025	Lisa Ajax as "Porslinsdockan"	Peter Jöback as "Racingräven"	Kishti Tomita as "Sushin"
6	12	9	March 27, 2026	May 22, 2026	John Lundvik as "Punk Papegojan"	Emil Henrohn as "Sheriffen"	Caroline Seger as "Gräsklipparen"
