= Scarlet (Swedish band) =

Swedish metal duo

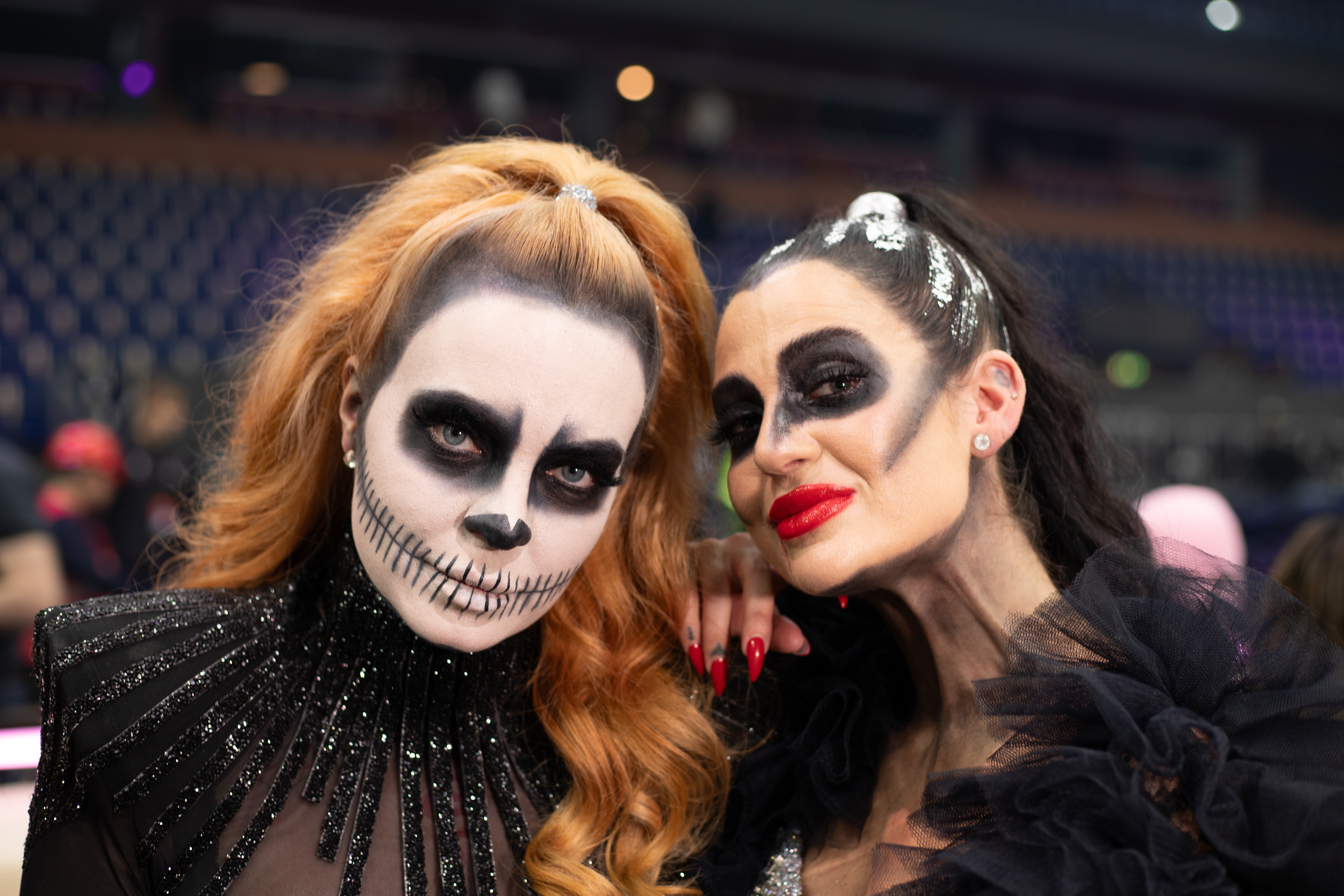
- Scarlet at Melodifestivalen 2025

Background information
- Origin: Sweden
- Genres: Heavy metal; nu metal; hard rock; industrial metal; alternative metal
- Years active: 2018–present
- Label: Universal Music Sweden
- Members: Scarlet Hunts; Thirsty

Scarlet is a Swedish heavy metal duo formed in 2018. The two members go by the pseudonyms Scarlet Hunts and Thirsty. Their real identities have not been publicly revealed.

== History ==
The band members Scarlet Hunts and Thirsty started writing music and lyrics together, and they claimed to have "an intriguing past, combined with present-day experiences and meetings with humans". The two's real names have not been publicised. In their first year as an active duo, Scarlet performed at Sweden Rock Festival, Gefle Metal Festival and Knotfest.

In 2018, Scarlet signed a contract with the record label ART:ERY Music Group, where they released their first three singles, entitled "Age of Seduction", "Hail the Apocalypse" and "Killer Quinn". Scarlet signed a contract in 2020 with the German record label Arising Empire and in November of that year, they released their debut album "Obey the Queen", which received outstanding reviews throughout the metal community.

On 1 December 2023, it was announced that Scarlet would participate in Melodifestivalen 2024 with the song "Circus X". Having qualified for the runoff vote of 2 March 2024, they were ultimately eliminated from the contest. On 26 November 2024, it was announced that Scarlet would participate in Melodifestivalen 2025 with the song "Sweet n' Psycho". On 1 March 2025, they qualified directly to the final held on 8 March, where they placed seventh.

In August 2024, the duo signed with record label Universal Music Group, booking agency United Stage and Steelstar Agency.

== Discography ==
=== Studio albums ===
List of studio albums, with selected details
Title	Details
Obey the Queen	Released: 13 November 2020; Label: Arising Empire; Formats: CD, Digital download, streaming
Don't be scared	Released: 29 May 2026

=== Singles ===
Title	Year	Peak chart positions	Album
Title	Year	SWE	Album
"Age of Seduction"	2018	—	Non-album singles
"Hail the Apocalypse"	2018	—	Non-album singles
"Killer Quinn"	2018	—	Non-album singles
"End in Blood"	2019	—	Non-album singles
"Beauty & Beast"	2020	—	Obey the Queen
"#bossbitch"	2020	—	Obey the Queen
"Love Heroin"	2020	—	Obey the Queen
"Everybody Dies"	2022	—	Non-album singles
"Circus X"	2024	12	Non-album singles
"Look What You Made Me Do"	2024	—	Non-album singles
"Goddess"	2024	—	Non-album singles
"Sweet n' Psycho"	2025	4	Non-album singles
