= Fingers Crossed (Agnes song) =

2020 single by Agnes

Single by Agnes

from the album Magic Still Exists
- Released: 21 August 2020
- Genre: Pop; disco
- Length: 3:23
- Label: Senga/Universal Music
- Songwriter(s): Agnes Carlsson; Salem Al Fakir; Vincent Pontare
- Producer(s): Vargas & Lagola

Agnes singles chronology
"Goodlife" (2020)	"Fingers Crossed" (2020)	"24 Hours" (2021)

"Fingers Crossed" is a song by Swedish singer Agnes serving as the lead single from her fifth studio album Magic Still Exists. It was released on 21 August 2020 through Senga and Universal Music. The song did not enter the Swedish Singles Chart until early November 2020, where it reached number thirty eight.

== Background ==
Agnes stated that the song was "inspired by the sense that nothing is impossible, because nothing is impossible. It's a song that can lift you up to new dimensions and like a peaceful tank it crushes everything in its way. The song does not excuse itself and I don't excuse myself. I welcome you now to my party, and it's my party so... I can do what I want to." "Fingers Crossed" is the first single from an upcoming album, to be released in 2021.

== Music video ==
A music video was first released onto YouTube the same day as the single release. The video was directed by SWIM CLUB, and inspired by the 1973 movie The Holy Mountain.

== Track listing ==
Digital single

1. "Fingers Crossed" – 3:23

Remixes single

1. "Fingers Crossed" - 3:23
2. "Fingers Crossed" (Billy Da Kid Remix) – 3:96
3. "Fingers Crossed" (Until Dawn Remix) – 3:23

== Charts ==
Chart performance for "Fingers Crossed"
Chart (2020–2021)	Peak position
Sweden (Sverigetopplistan)	38

== Release history ==
Release history for "Fingers Crossed"
Region	Date	Format	Label
Various	21 August 2020	Digital download; streaming	Senga
