= Alexander Pärleros =

Swedish television personality

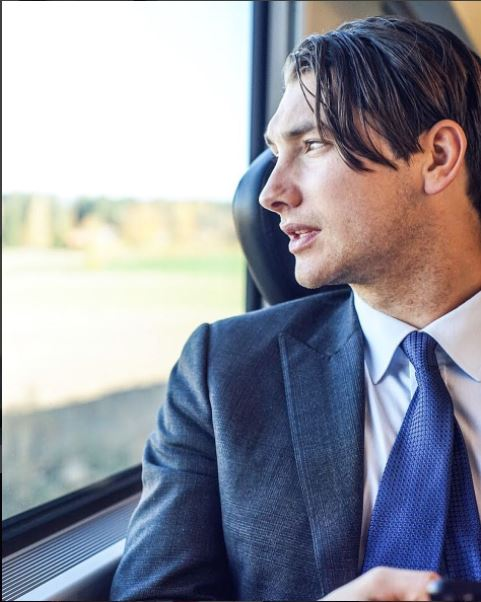
- Alexander Pärleros in 2017
- Born: 9 March 1985 (age 41); Stockholm, Sweden

Alexander Roland Andreas Warg-Pärleros (born Jönsson, 9 March 1985) is a Swedish television personality and podcaster. In 2018, he published the book Framgångsboken: Mina nycklar till ett lyckligare och rikare liv In 2025, he participated in the TV4 show Förrädarna (The traitors). Since 2015, Pärleros hosts the podcast Framgångspodden.

== Bibliography ==
- 2018 – Framgångsboken: Mina nycklar till ett lyckligare och rikare liv. Stockholm: Forum bokförlag. Libris 22410016. ISBN 9789137152332
