= Rakt in i kaklet =

Single by Samir & Viktor
- Released: 3 November 2017
- Recorded: 2017
- Genre: Pop
- Length: 3:12
- Label: Warner Music Sweden

Samir & Viktor singles chronology
| "Vi gör det ändå" (2017) | "Rakt in i kaklet" (2017) | "Shuffla" (2018) |

"Rakt in i kaklet" is a song by the Swedish duo Samir & Viktor. The song was released in Sweden as a digital download on 3 November 2017. The song peaked at number 44 on the Swedish Singles Chart.

== Music video ==
A music video to accompany the release of "Rakt in i kaklet" was first released onto YouTube on 2 November 2017 at a total length of three minutes and twelve seconds.

== Track listing ==
Digital download
| No. | Title | Length |
|---|---|---|
| 1. | "Rakt in i kaklet" | 3:12 |

== Charts ==
| Chart (2017) | Peak position |
|---|---|
| Sweden (Sverigetopplistan) | 44 |

== Release history ==
| Region | Date | Format | Label |
|---|---|---|---|
| Sweden | 3 November 2017 | Digital download | Warner Music Sweden |
