= Samir & Viktor =

Swedish musical duo

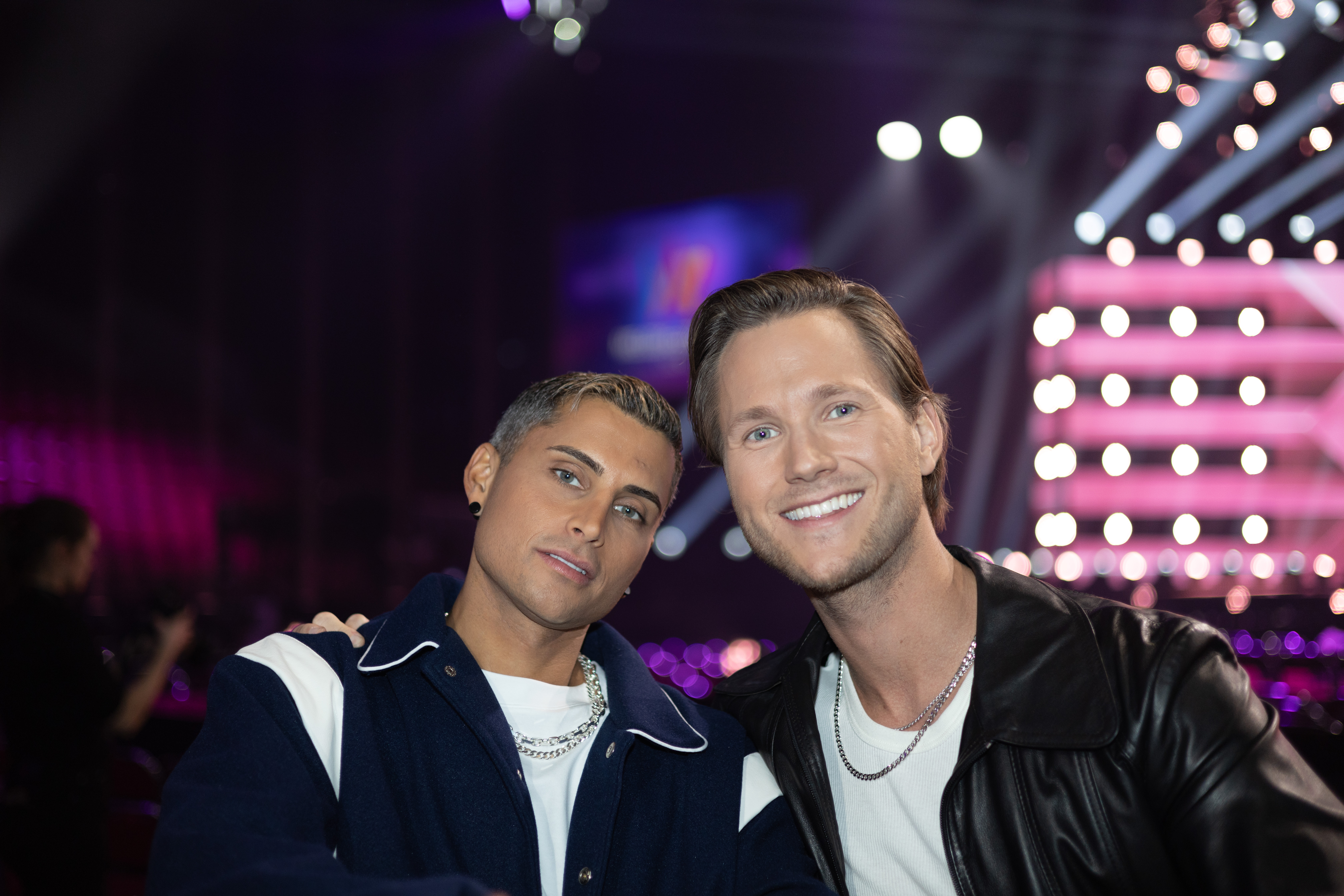
- Samir & Viktor after Melodifestivalen 2024

Background information
- Origin: Stockholm, Sweden
- Genres: Pop, dance, electropop
- Years active: 2014–2020, 2023–2025
- Labels: Stockhouse, Warner Music Sweden
- Members: Samir Badran; Viktor Frisk

Samir & Viktor or Samir och Viktor was a Swedish music duo that consists of Samir Badran and Viktor Frisk. They participated in Melodifestivalen 2015 with the song "Groupie", which finished eighth in the final, and again in Melodifestivalen 2016 with "Bada Nakna" which placed 12th overall. They competed a third time in Melodifestivalen 2018 with "Shuffla", finishing in 4th place in the grand final. They competed a fourth time in Melodifestivalen 2024 with "Hela världen väntar", but were eliminated during the early heats.

== Career ==
=== 2014: Debut single ===
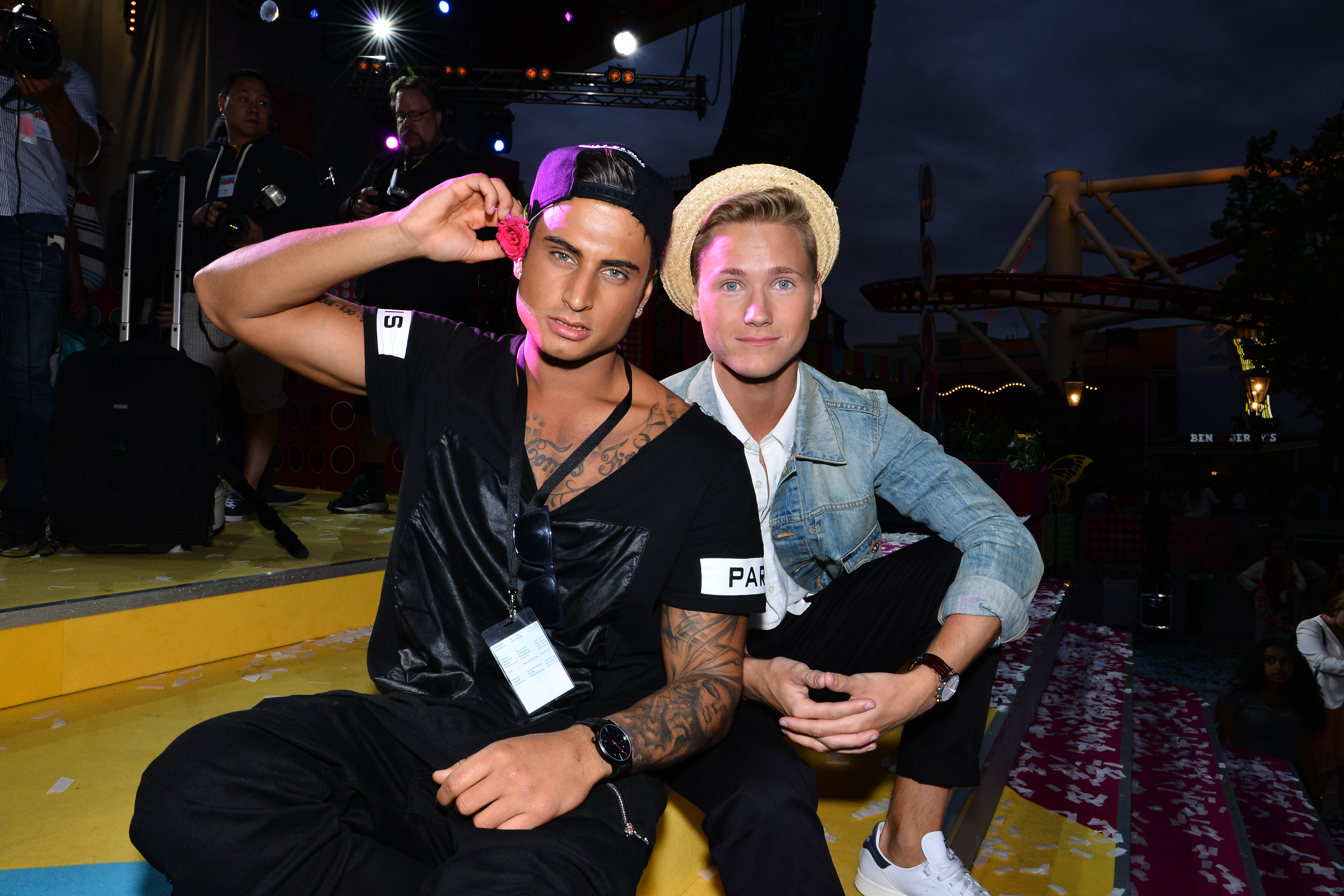
Samir & Viktor at Sommarkrysset 2014

In May 2014 the duo released their first music single called "Success". The song peaked at number one in its first week on the Swedish iTunes chart. It also reached number three on the Swedish Singles Chart.

=== 2015–2020: Melodifestivalen and Hiatus ===
Samir & Viktor participated in Melodifestivalen 2015 with the song "Groupie" in a bid to represent Sweden in the Eurovision Song Contest 2015 in Vienna, Austria. They performed on 14 February 2015 in the second semi-final round finishing 3rd moving to the "Second Chance" round on 7 March 2015 where they confronted Behrang Miri feat. Victor Crone in "Det rår vi inte för". Winning the round with a big margin, they qualified to the finals in Stockholm held on 14 March finishing eighth overall. "Groupie" proved very successful commercially reaching number three on Sverigetopplistan, the official Swedish Singles Chart. The duo's follow-up single was "Saxofuckingfon", the song peaked at number two on the Swedish Singles Chart.

They took part in Melodifestivalen 2016 with the song "Bada nakna". They qualified to andra chansen through the first semi-final on 6 February 2016. They qualified to the final through andra chasen, but they ended up placing last. Their follow-up single "Fick Feeling" was digitally released on 25 May 2016. After that, the group announced they would be taking a hiatus to pursue solo endeavours. They released their comeback single "Kung" on 12 May 2017.

They participated in Melodifestivalen 2018 with "Shuffla", finishing in 4th place in the grand final, their best placing in Melodifestivalen yet.

On 16 October 2020, Samir and Viktor announced they will be going on another hiatus to pursue their own interests. They released one final single “Arbetslös”

=== 2023–present: Second Comeback ===
On 4 June 2023, Viktor revealed on the TV program Nyhetsmorgon that he and Samir will be making another comeback, and will release a new single. They released their second comeback single "SKÅL" on 16 June 2023.

They participated in Melodifestivalen 2024 with the song "Hela världen väntar", being eliminated during their heat on 3 February 2024.

== Discography ==
=== Singles ===
Title	Year	Peak chart positions		Certifications	Album
Title	Year	SWE	NOR	Certifications	Album
"Success"	2014	3	—	GLF: 3× Platinum	Non-album singles
"Groupie"	2015	3	—	GLF: 3× Platinum	Non-album singles
"Saxofuckingfon"	2015	2	10	GLF: 3× Platinum; IFPI NOR: 2× Platinum	Non-album singles
"Bada nakna"	2016	1	—	GLF: 3× Platinum	Non-album singles
"Fick Feeling"	2016	11	—	GLF: Platinum	Non-album singles
"Kung"	2017	30	—		Non-album singles
"Vi gör det ändå"	2017	26	—		Non-album singles
"Rakt in i kaklet"	2017	44	—		Non-album singles
"Shuffla"	2018	2	—	GLF: Gold	Non-album singles
"Put Your Hands Up för Sverige" (featuring Anis Don Demina)	2018	4	—		Non-album singles
"Odödlig"	2019	20	—		Non-album singles
"Kemi"	2019	55	—		Non-album singles
"Va som mig" (featuring 1.Cuz)	2019	48	—		Non-album singles
"Karantän" (with Tix)	2020	56	—		Non-album singles
"Vad sa du att du hette"	2020	—	—		Non-album singles
"Arbetslös"	2020	—	—		Non-album singles
"Skål"	2023	— (Note: "Skål" did not enter the Swedish Singellista Chart, but peaked at number 16 on the Swedish Heatseeker Chart.)	—		Non-album singles
"Hela världen väntar"	2024	25	—		Non-album singles
"—" denotes a single that did not chart or was not released in that territory.					Non-album singles
