= Kung (song) =

Single by Samir & Viktor
- Released: 12 May 2017
- Genre: Pop
- Length: 3:18
- Label: Warner Music Sweden

Samir & Viktor singles chronology
"Fick Feeling" (2016)	"Kung" (2017)	"Vi gör det ändå" (2017)

"Kung" is a song by the Swedish duo Samir & Viktor. The song was released in Sweden as a digital download on 12 May 2017. The song peaked at number 30 on the Swedish Singles Chart.

== Music video ==
A music video to accompany the release of "Kung" was first released onto YouTube on 13 May 2017 at a total length of three minutes and twenty seconds.

== Charts ==
Chart (2017)	Peak position
Sweden (Sverigetopplistan)	30

== Release history ==
Region	Date	Format	Label
Sweden	12 May 2017	Digital download	Warner Music Sweden
