= Tareq Taylor =

Swedish chef and restaurateur

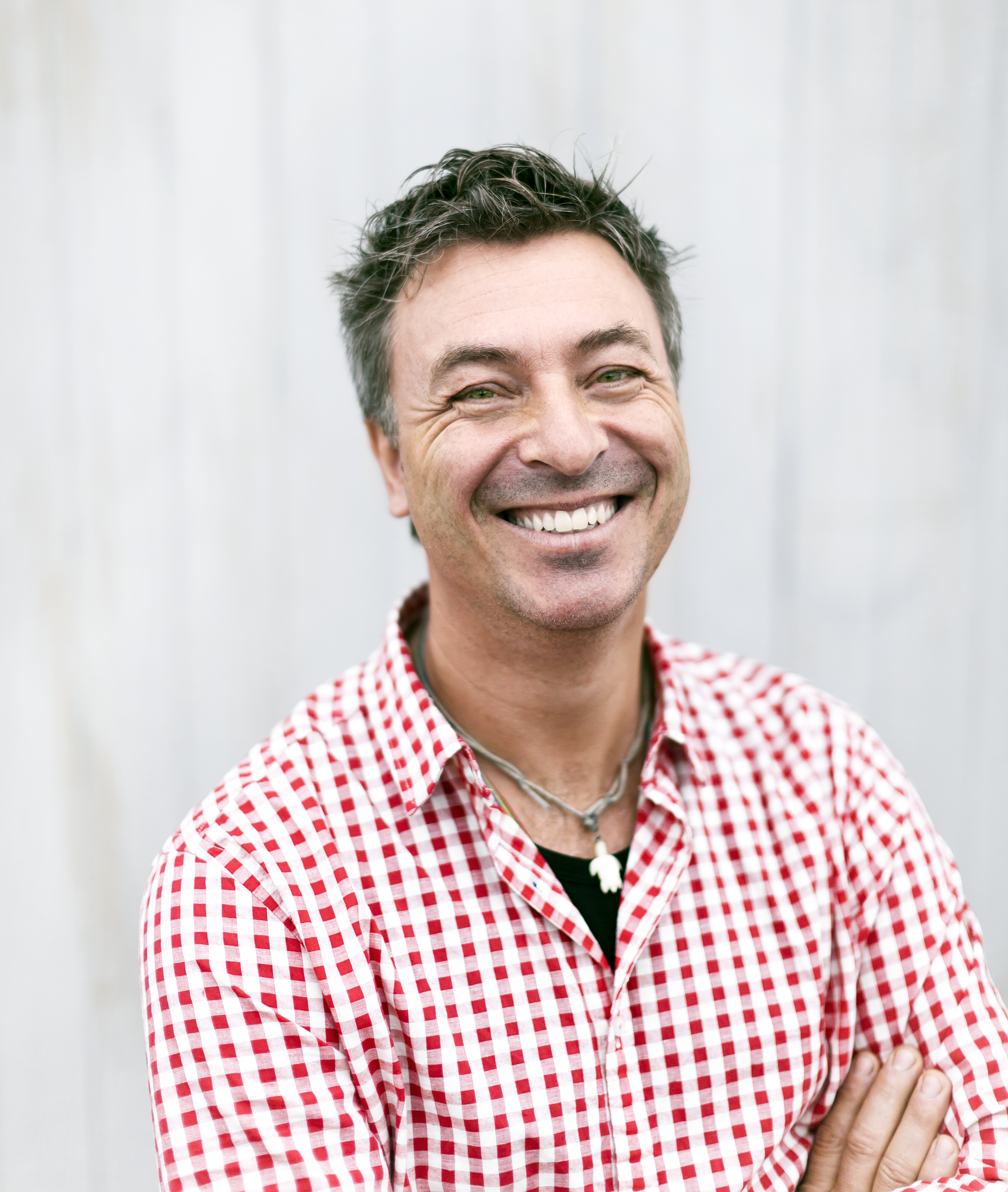
- Taylor in 2012
- Born: 30 July 1969 (age 56); Malmö, Sweden
- Notable work: Trädgårdsonsdag

Tareq Frank Daoudi Taylor (born 30 July 1969) is a Swedish chef and restaurateur. He has been a television-chef for SVT in shows like Trädgårdsonsdag along with Pernilla Månsson and Go'kväll, as well as the Christmas Calendar Tusen år till julafton. He has also participated in the summer show Sommarlov for a couple of summers also for SVT. Internationally he is known for his TV-show Tareq Taylor's Nordic Cookery where he explores the Nordic Cuisine.

In 2014, he opened the restaurant Kockeriet in Malmö, where the guests get their food from different stations at the restaurant and help with preparing their own meals. In 2013, he hosted an episode of Sommar i P1 at Sveriges Radio where he talked about his career.

Taylor and his wife were separated in September 2021; together they have daughter Ellen, who in 2015 participated in Sveriges Yngsta Mästerkock, a cooking show for children broadcast on TV4, where she placed third.

Sofia Ståhl is Taylor's partner since 2022, and the couple got their first child together in January 2025.

== Bibliography ==
- Taylor, Tareq; Öhlin Lindeheim Petra (2011). Om mat och kärlek. Västerås: Ica. Libris 12033048. ISBN 978-91-534-3575-4
- Taylor, Tareq; Taylor Kristina, Kroon Peter (2012). Sylta, safta och lägg in. Västerås: Ica. Libris 12751118. ISBN 978-91-534-3786-4
- Taylor, Tareq; Taylor Kristina (2012). Klassiker. Västerås: Ica. Libris 12341635. ISBN 978-91-534-3785-7
- Taylor, Tareq; Taylor Stina (2012). Blomstrande gott. [Sverige]: Slottsträdgårdens kafé. Libris 13987856
- Taylor, Tareq; Taylor Stina (2014). Helt Enkelt. Massolit Förlag. ISBN 978-91-87785-15-3
- Taylor, Tareq (2015). Tareq Taylors nordiska matresa. Roos & Tegnér. ISBN 978-91-86691-93-6
- Taylor, Tareq (2016). Mat som gör gott: Ny vardag med Tareq Taylor. Bonnier Fakta. ISBN 978-91-7424-478-6
- Taylor, Tareq (2017) Tareq Taylors kyckling. Bonnier Fakta. ISBN 978-91-7424-638-4
