= Bada nakna =

Single by Samir & Viktor
- Released: 6 February 2016
- Genre: Pop; dance-pop
- Length: 3:11
- Label: Warner Music Sweden
- Songwriters: Fredrik Kempe; David Kreuger; Anderz Wrethov

Samir & Viktor singles chronology
"Saxofuckingfon" (2015)	"Bada nakna" (2016)	"Fick Feeling" (2016)

Music video
- "Bada nakna" on YouTube

"Bada nakna" (English: Bath naked) is a song by Swedish duo Samir & Viktor. The song was released in Sweden as a digital download on 6 February 2016, and was written by Fredrik Kempe, David Kreuger, and Anderz Wrethov. It took part in Melodifestivalen 2016, and qualified to the second chance round (andra chansen) from the first semi-final. In andra chansen, it qualified to the final, where it subsequently placed last.

== Charts ==
=== Weekly charts ===
Chart (2016)	Peak position
Sweden (Sverigetopplistan)	1

=== Year-end charts ===
Chart (2016)	Position
Swedish Singles (Sverigetopplistan)	39

== Certifications ==
Region	Certification	Certified units/sales
Sweden (GLF)	4× Platinum	160,000^{‡}
^{‡} Sales+streaming figures based on certification alone.

== Release history ==
Region	Date	Format	Label
Sweden	6 February 2016	Digital download; streaming	Warner Music Sweden
