= Groupie (Samir & Viktor song) =

Single by Samir & Viktor
- Released: 14 February 2015
- Genre: Pop
- Length: 3:00
- Label: Warner Music Sweden
- Songwriters: Anton Malmberg Hård af Segerstad; Maria Smith; Kevin Högdahl; Viktor Thell

Samir & Viktor singles chronology
"Success" (2014)	"Groupie" (2015)	"Saxofuckingfon" (2015)

"Groupie" is a song by Swedish duo Samir & Viktor. The song was released in Sweden as a digital download on 14 February 2015. The song took part in Melodifestivalen 2015 and qualified to Andra Chansen (Second Chance) round through the second semi-final on 14 February 2015. In the Andra Chansen round on 7 March 2015, the song managed to qualify to the Melodifestivalen final, defeating "Det rår vi inte för" by Behrang Miri featuring Victor Crone. The song finished 8th in the final.

== Track listing ==
Digital download
No.	Title	Length
1.	"Groupie"	3:01
2.	"Groupie" (Instrumental)	2:58

== Charts ==
=== Weekly charts ===
Chart (2015)	Peak position
Sweden (Sverigetopplistan)	3

=== Year-end charts ===
Chart (2015)	Position
Sweden (Sverigetopplistan)	49

== Certifications ==
Region	Certification	Certified units/sales
Sweden (GLF)	3× Platinum	120,000^{‡}
^{‡} Sales+streaming figures based on certification alone.

== Release history ==
Region	Date	Format	Label
Sweden	14 February 2015	Digital download	Warner Music Sweden
