= Saxofuckingfon =

Single by Samir & Viktor
- Released: 5 June 2015
- Genre: Pop
- Length: 3:18
- Label: Warner Music Sweden
- Songwriters: Anton Hård af Segerstad; Kevin Magnus Alexander Hoegdahl; Victor Thell

Samir & Viktor singles chronology
| "Groupie" (2015) | "Saxofuckingfon" (2015) | "Bada nakna" (2016) |

"Saxofuckingfon" is a song by the Swedish duo Samir & Viktor. The song was released in Sweden as a digital download on 5 June 2015. The song peaked at number two on the Swedish Singles Chart.

== Track listing ==
Digital download
| No. | Title | Length |
|---|---|---|
| 1. | "Saxofuckingfon" | 3:18 |

== Charts ==
=== Weekly charts ===
| Chart (2015) | Peak position |
|---|---|
| Sweden (Sverigetopplistan) | 2 |
| Norway (VG-lista) | 10 |

=== Year-end charts ===
| Chart (2015) | Position |
|---|---|
| Sweden (Sverigetopplistan) | 62 |

== Certifications ==
| Region | Certification | Certified units/sales |
|---|---|---|
| Norway (IFPI Norway) | 2× Platinum | 80,000^{‡} |
| Sweden (GLF) | 3× Platinum | 120,000^{‡} |
^{‡} Sales+streaming figures based on certification alone.

== Release history ==
| Region | Date | Format | Label |
|---|---|---|---|
| Sweden | 5 June 2015 | Digital download | Warner Music Sweden |
