= Vi gör det ändå =

Single by Samir & Viktor
- Released: 14 July 2017
- Recorded: 2017
- Genre: Pop
- Length: 2:58
- Label: Warner Music Sweden

Samir & Viktor singles chronology
"Kung" (2017)	"Vi gör det ändå" (2017)	"Rakt in i kaklet" (2017)

"Vi gör det ändå" is a song by the Swedish duo Samir & Viktor. It was released in Sweden as a digital download on 14 July 2017. The song peaked at number 26 on the Swedish Singles Chart.

== Music video ==
A music video to accompany the release of "Vi gör det ändå" was first released onto YouTube on 14 July 2017.

== Charts ==
Chart (2017)	Peak position
Sweden (Sverigetopplistan)	26

== Release history ==
Region	Date	Format	Label
Sweden	14 July 2017	Digital download	Warner Music Sweden
