= Fick feeling =

"Fick Feeling"

Single by Samir & Viktor
- Released: 25 May 2016
- Genre: Pop; dance-pop
- Length: 3:21
- Label: Warner Music Sweden
- Songwriters: Samir Badran; Nadir Benkahla; Viktor Frisk; Anton Hård af Segerstad; Kevin Magnus Alexander Hoegdahl; Saaed Molavi; Maria Jane Smith; Victor Thell

Samir & Viktor singles chronology
"Bada nakna" (2016)	"Fick Feeling" (2016)	"Kung" (2017)

Music video
- "Fick Feeling" on YouTube

"Fick Feeling" (English: Got the feeling) is a song by Swedish duo Samir & Viktor. The song was released in Sweden as a digital download on 25 May 2016. The song peaked at number 11 on the Swedish Singles Chart.

== Charts ==
Chart (2016)	Peak position
Sweden (Sverigetopplistan)	11

== Certifications ==
Region	Certification	Certified units/sales
Sweden (GLF)	Platinum	40,000^{‡}
^{‡} Sales+streaming figures based on certification alone.

== Release history ==
Region	Date	Format	Label
Sweden	25 May 2016	Digital download	Warner Music Sweden
