= Shuffla =

2018 single by Samir & Viktor

Single by Samir & Viktor
- Language: Swedish
- English title: Shuffle
- Released: February 24, 2018
- Genre: pop
- Length: 3:04
- Label: Warner Music Sweden
- Songwriters: Andreas "Stone" Johansson, Denniz Jamm, Costa Leon, Samir Badran, Viktor Frisk

"Shuffla" is a song performed by Swedish music duo Samir & Viktor. The song topped Heat 2, 10 February 2018, and made it to the final of Melodifestivalen 2018 in Friends Arena on 10 March.

== Charts ==
=== Weekly charts ===
Chart (2018)	Peak position
Sweden (Sverigetopplistan)	2

=== Year-end charts ===
Chart (2018)	Position
Sweden (Sverigetopplistan)	21
