= Sweden in the Eurovision Song Contest 2021 =

- Eurovision Song Contest 2021
- Participating broadcaster: Sveriges Television (SVT)
- Country: Sweden
- Selection process: Melodifestivalen 2021
- Selection date: 13 March 2021

Competing entry
- Song: "Voices"
- Artist: Tusse
- Songwriters: Joy Deb; Linnea Deb; Jimmy "Joker" Thörnfeldt; Anderz Wrethov

Placement
- Semi-final result: Qualified (7th, 142 points)
- Final result: 14th, 109 points

Participation chronology

Sweden was represented at the Eurovision Song Contest 2021 with the song "Voices", written by Joy Deb, Linnea Deb, Jimmy "Joker" Thörnfeldt, and Anderz Wrethov, and performed by Tusse. The Swedish participating broadcaster, Sveriges Television (SVT), organised Melodifestivalen 2021 in order to select its entry for the contest.

== Background ==
Prior to the 2021 contest, Sveriges Radio (SR) until 1979, and Sveriges Television (SVT) since 1980, had participated in the Eurovision Song Contest representing Sweden fifty-nine times since SR's first entry in 1958. Sweden had won the contest on six occasions: in 1974 with the song "Waterloo" performed by ABBA, in 1984 with the song "Diggi-Loo Diggi-Ley" performed by Herreys, in 1991 with the song "Fångad av en stormvind" performed by Carola, in 1999 with the song "Take Me to Your Heaven" performed by Charlotte Nilsson, in 2012 with the song "Euphoria" performed by Loreen, and in 2015 with the song "Heroes" performed by Måns Zelmerlöw. Following the introduction of semi-finals for the 2004, Sweden's entries, to this point, have featured in every final except for 2010 when the nation failed to qualify.

As part of its duties as participating broadcaster, SVT organises the selection of its entry in the Eurovision Song Contest and broadcasts the event in the country. Since 1959, SR first and SVT later have organised the annual competition Melodifestivalen in order to select their entries for the contest.

== Before Eurovision ==
=== Melodifestivalen 2021 ===
Four heats, a Second Chance round and a final were held. It was held between 6 February and 13 March 2021 and all shows were held at the Annexet in Stockholm without an audience.

==== Heats and Second Chance round ====
- The first heat took place on 6 February 2021. "Dandi dansa" performed by Danny Saucedo and "Tänker inte alls gå hem" performed by Arvingarna qualified directly to the final, while "The Missing Piece" performed by Paul Rey and "Pretender" performed by Lillasyster advanced to the Second Chance round. "One Touch" performed by Kadiatou, "Horizon" performed by Jessica Andersson, and "Fingerprints" performed by Nathalie Brydolf were eliminated from the contest.
- The second heat took place on 13 February 2021. "Little Tot" performed by Dotter and "New Religion" performed by Anton Ewald qualified directly to the final, while "Rena rama ding dong" performed by Eva Rydberg and Ewa Roos and "The Silence" performed by Frida Green advanced to the Second Chance round. "Rich" performed by Julia Alfrida, "90-talet" performed by Wahl featuring Sami, and "Tears Run Dry" performed by Patrik Jean, were eliminated from the contest.
- The third heat took place on 20 February 2021. "Voices" performed by Tusse and "Still Young" performed by Charlotte Perrelli qualified directly to the final, while "Bailá Bailá" performed by Alvaro Estrella and "Beat of Broken Hearts" performed by Klara Hammarström advanced to the Second Chance round. "Om allting skiter sig" performed by Emil Assergård, "Contagious" performed by Mustasch, and "Den du är" performed by Elisa were eliminated from the contest.
- The fourth heat took place on 27 February 2021. "In the Middle" performed by the Mamas and "Every Minute" performed by Eric Saade qualified directly to the final, while "Best of Me" performed by Efraim Leo and "Behöver inte dig idag" performed by Clara Klingenström advanced to the Second Chance round. "Good Life" performed by Tess Merkel, "Allting är precis likadant" performed by Lovad, and "All Inclusive" performed by Sannex were eliminated from the contest.
- The Second Chance round (Andra chansen) took place on 6 March 2021. "Bailá Bailá" performed by Alvaro Estrella, "The Missing Piece" performed by Paul Rey, "Behöver inte dig idag" performed by Clara Klingenström, and "Beat of Broken Hearts" performed by Klara Hammarström qualified to the final.

==== Final ====
The final took place on 13 March 2021.

R/O	Artist	Song	Juries	Televote	Total	Place
1	Danny Saucedo	"Dandi dansa"	39	35	74	7
2	Klara Hammarström	"Beat of Broken Hearts"	43	36	79	6
3	Anton Ewald	"New Religion"	9	16	25	11
4	The Mamas	"In the Middle"	50	56	106	3
5	Paul Rey	"The Missing Piece"	18	7	25	12
6	Charlotte Perrelli	"Still Young"	32	28	60	8
7	Tusse	"Voices"	79	96	175	1
8	Alvaro Estrella	"Bailá Bailá"	7	19	26	10
9	Clara Klingenström	"Behöver inte dig idag"	39	52	91	5
10	Eric Saade	"Every Minute"	69	49	118	2
11	Dotter	"Little Tot"	57	48	105	4
12	Arvingarna	"Tänker inte alls gå hem"	22	22	44	9

== At Eurovision ==
According to Eurovision rules, all nations with the exceptions of the host country and the "Big Five" (France, Germany, Italy, Spain and the United Kingdom) are required to qualify from one of two semi-finals in order to compete in the final; the top ten countries from each semi-final progress to the final. The European Broadcasting Union (EBU) split up the competing countries into six different pots based on voting patterns from previous contests, with countries with favourable voting histories put into the same pot. For the 2021 contest, the semi-final allocation draw held for 2020 which was held on 28 January 2020, will be used. Sweden was placed into the first semi-final, to be held on 18 May 2021, and was scheduled to perform in the first half of the show.

=== Semi-final ===
Once all the competing songs for the 2021 contest had been released, the running order for the semi-finals was decided by the shows' producers rather than through another draw, so that similar songs were not placed next to each other. Sweden was set to perform in position 4, following the entry from Russia and preceding the entry from Australia.

On 18 May, the day the semi-final was held, Sweden qualified for the Grand Final.

=== Final ===
Sweden performed 25th in the grand final on 22 May 2021, following Italy and preceding San Marino.

=== Voting ===
Voting during the three shows involved each country awarding two sets of points from 1-8, 10 and 12: one from their professional jury and the other from televoting. Each nation's jury consisted of five music industry professionals who are citizens of the country they represent, with a diversity in gender and age represented. The judges assess each entry based on the performances during the second Dress Rehearsal of each show, which takes place the night before each live show, against a set of criteria including: vocal capacity; the stage performance; the song's composition and originality; and the overall impression by the act. Jury members may only take part in panel once every three years, and are obliged to confirm that they are not connected to any of the participating acts in a way that would impact their ability to vote impartially. Jury members should also vote independently, with no discussion of their vote permitted with other jury members. The exact composition of the professional jury, and the results of each country's jury and televoting were released after the grand final; the individual results from each jury member were also released in an anonymised form.

==== Points awarded to Sweden ====
Points awarded to Sweden (Semi-final 1)
Score	Televote	Jury
12 points		Germany
10 points	Malta; Norway	Malta; Norway
8 points		
7 points	Belgium	Cyprus; Russia
6 points		Australia; Azerbaijan; Belgium
5 points	Lithuania	Israel; Netherlands
4 points	Ireland	Italy; Romania
3 points	Cyprus; Ukraine	Lithuania; Ukraine
2 points	Israel; Netherlands; Russia; Slovenia	
1 point	Azerbaijan	Croatia; Ireland; North Macedonia

Points awarded to Sweden (Final)
Score	Televote	Jury
12 points		
10 points	Denmark; Iceland	Norway
8 points	Malta; Norway	Malta
7 points		
6 points		
5 points		Azerbaijan; Finland
4 points	Portugal	Belgium; Germany; Serbia
3 points	Belgium; Finland; Moldova; Switzerland	North Macedonia
2 points	France; Ukraine	Denmark
1 point	Albania; Bulgaria; Estonia; Ireland; Latvia; Lithuania; Poland	France

==== Points awarded by Sweden ====
Points awarded by Sweden (Semi-final 1)
Score	Televote	Jury
12 points	Norway	Malta
10 points	Lithuania	Israel
8 points	Malta	Norway
7 points	Ukraine	Lithuania
6 points	Israel	Russia
5 points	Belgium	Ukraine
4 points	Cyprus	Cyprus
3 points	Russia	Azerbaijan
2 points	Croatia	Belgium
1 point	Azerbaijan	Ireland

Points awarded by Sweden (Final)
Score	Televote	Jury
12 points	Finland	Malta
10 points	Iceland	Italy
8 points	Norway	Ukraine
7 points	Lithuania	Iceland
6 points	France	France
5 points	Switzerland	Switzerland
4 points	Ukraine	Israel
3 points	Italy	Russia
2 points	Malta	Norway
1 point	Serbia	Belgium

==== Detailed voting results ====
The following members comprised the Swedish jury:

- Emelie Fjällström
- Nanne Grönvall
- Björn Kjellman
- Tina Mehrafzoon
- Omar Rudberg

Detailed voting results from Sweden (Semi-final 1)
R/O	Country	Jury							Televote	
R/O	Country	Juror A	Juror B	Juror C	Juror D	Juror E	Rank	Points	Rank	Points
01	Lithuania	2	6	2	9	12	4	7	2	10
02	Slovenia	11	8	14	14	9	14		15	
03	Russia	3	3	6	8	7	5	6	8	3
04	Sweden									
05	Australia	10	11	7	12	5	11		14	
06	North Macedonia	5	14	13	13	14	13		13	
07	Ireland	13	5	10	6	11	10	1	11	
08	Cyprus	8	2	11	4	6	7	4	7	4
09	Norway	9	4	9	2	4	3	8	1	12
10	Croatia	15	10	12	10	13	15		9	2
11	Belgium	14	12	4	11	2	9	2	6	5
12	Israel	7	7	3	1	10	2	10	5	6
13	Romania	12	15	15	7	8	12		12	
14	Azerbaijan	6	9	8	5	3	8	3	10	1
15	Ukraine	1	13	1	15	15	6	5	4	7
16	Malta	4	1	5	3	1	1	12	3	8

Detailed voting results from Sweden (Final)
R/O	Country	Jury							Televote	
R/O	Country	Juror A	Juror B	Juror C	Juror D	Juror E	Rank	Points	Rank	Points
01	Cyprus	11	9	16	6	14	16		14	
02	Albania	20	22	22	23	21	25		15	
03	Israel	15	15	4	1	16	7	4	20	
04	Belgium	13	23	7	10	3	10	1	16	
05	Russia	4	5	9	11	13	8	3	12	
06	Malta	7	3	6	2	1	1	12	9	2
07	Portugal	16	17	15	8	2	11		11	
08	Serbia	17	24	13	21	20	21		10	1
09	United Kingdom	23	16	25	4	18	17		25	
10	Greece	24	20	23	17	19	23		17	
11	Switzerland	10	2	8	15	4	6	5	6	5
12	Iceland	3	12	2	13	7	4	7	2	10
13	Spain	25	25	24	16	17	22		24	
14	Moldova	18	18	21	24	25	24		13	
15	Germany	21	13	20	12	24	20		21	
16	Finland	12	8	19	18	5	14		1	12
17	Bulgaria	8	7	17	7	10	12		19	
18	Lithuania	9	10	5	19	22	15		4	7
19	Ukraine	1	14	1	25	23	3	8	7	4
20	France	2	4	10	9	8	5	6	5	6
21	Azerbaijan	6	21	14	5	12	13		18	
22	Norway	19	6	11	3	9	9	2	3	8
23	Netherlands	14	19	12	14	15	18		22	
24	Italy	5	1	3	20	6	2	10	8	3
25	Sweden									
26	San Marino	22	11	18	22	11	19		23	
