= Cookie Jar (Red Velvet song) =

"#Cookie Jar"

Single by Red Velvet

from the album #Cookie Jar
- Language: Japanese
- Released: July 4, 2018
- Genre: J-pop; electropop
- Length: 3:33
- Label: SM; Avex
- Songwriters: MEG.ME; Efraim Faramir Sixten Fransesco Vindalf Cederqvist Leo; JFMee; Gavin Jones; Saima Irén Mian; Ronny Vidar Svendsen; Anne Judith Wik; Nermin Harambašić

Red Velvet singles chronology
"Bad Boy" (2018)	"#Cookie Jar" (2018)	"Power Up" (2018)

Music video
- "#Cookie Jar" on YouTube

"#Cookie Jar" (Hashtag Cookie Jar) is a song recorded by South Korean girl group Red Velvet, taken from their debut Japanese extended play of the same name, #Cookie Jar (2018). It was written by Efraim Faramir Sixten Fransesco Vindalf Cederqvist Leo, JFMee, Gavin Jones, Saima Irén Mian, Ronny Vidar Svendsen, Anne Judith Wik and Nermin Harambašić.

== Background and composition ==
It was reported that Red Velvet will have their Japan debut on July after Japan Nikkan Sports and Sankei Sports reported that the group had its first Japanese conference at the Sports Plaza in Musashino, Tokyo. Red Velvet confirmed themselves that they will officially debut in Japan during their Redmare concert tour.

Musically, "#Cookie Jar" was described as a song that has "groovy bassline and uptempo, twinkling electro-pop melody" that recalls Rookie.

== Reception ==
Following its initial release, "#Cookie Jar" was met with mixed reviews from music critics. Lee Gi-eun of TV Daily called the track "addicting", further adding that "even if you only listen to it once, the merriness of the Red Velvet songs is there". Writing for Billboard, Tamar Herman described the track that "leads up to its funky earworm of a chorus".

== Music video ==
The music video features the group members dressed in cute pastel-style outfits and original accessories, showing off unrealistic comic visuals. Following the music video's release, Seok Tae-jin of Insight Korea described the group's "unique, fresh, and bubbly charms", further praising the video for its "dazzling visuals.". Tamar Herman of Billboard noted Red Velvet's "similarly bubbly, bathing the fivesome in retro looks inspired by the '60s, '70s, and '80s" music video theme.

== Credits and personnel ==
Credits adapted from the liner notes of #Cookie Jar and Bloom.

Studio

- MonoTree Studio – recording
- SM Yellow Tail Studio – mixing
- Sterling Sound – mastering

Personnel

- Red Velvet (Irene, Seulgi, Wendy, Joy, Yeri) – vocals, background vocals
- MEG.ME – lyrics
- Efraim Faramir Sixten Fransesco Vindalf Cederqvist Leo – composition
- Mats Koray Genc – composition
- Gavin Jones – composition
- Saima Iren Mian – composition
- Ronny Vidar Svendsen – composition
- Anne Judith Stokke Wik – composition
- Nermin Harambasic – composition
- Hyun Hwang – vocal directing, Pro Tools operation, digital editing, recording
- Keita Joko – digital editing
- Jong-pil Gu (BeatBurger) – mixing
- Chris Gehringer – mastering

== Charts ==
=== Weekly charts ===
Weekly chart performance for "#Cookie Jar"
Chart (2018)	Peak position
South Korea International Singles (Gaon)	93
US World Digital Song Sales (Billboard)	20

== Release history ==
Release dates and formats for "#Cookie Jar"
Region	Date	Format	Label	Ref.
Various	July 4, 2018	Digital download; streaming	SM Entertainment; Avex	
