= Dotter (singer) =

Swedish singer (born 1987)

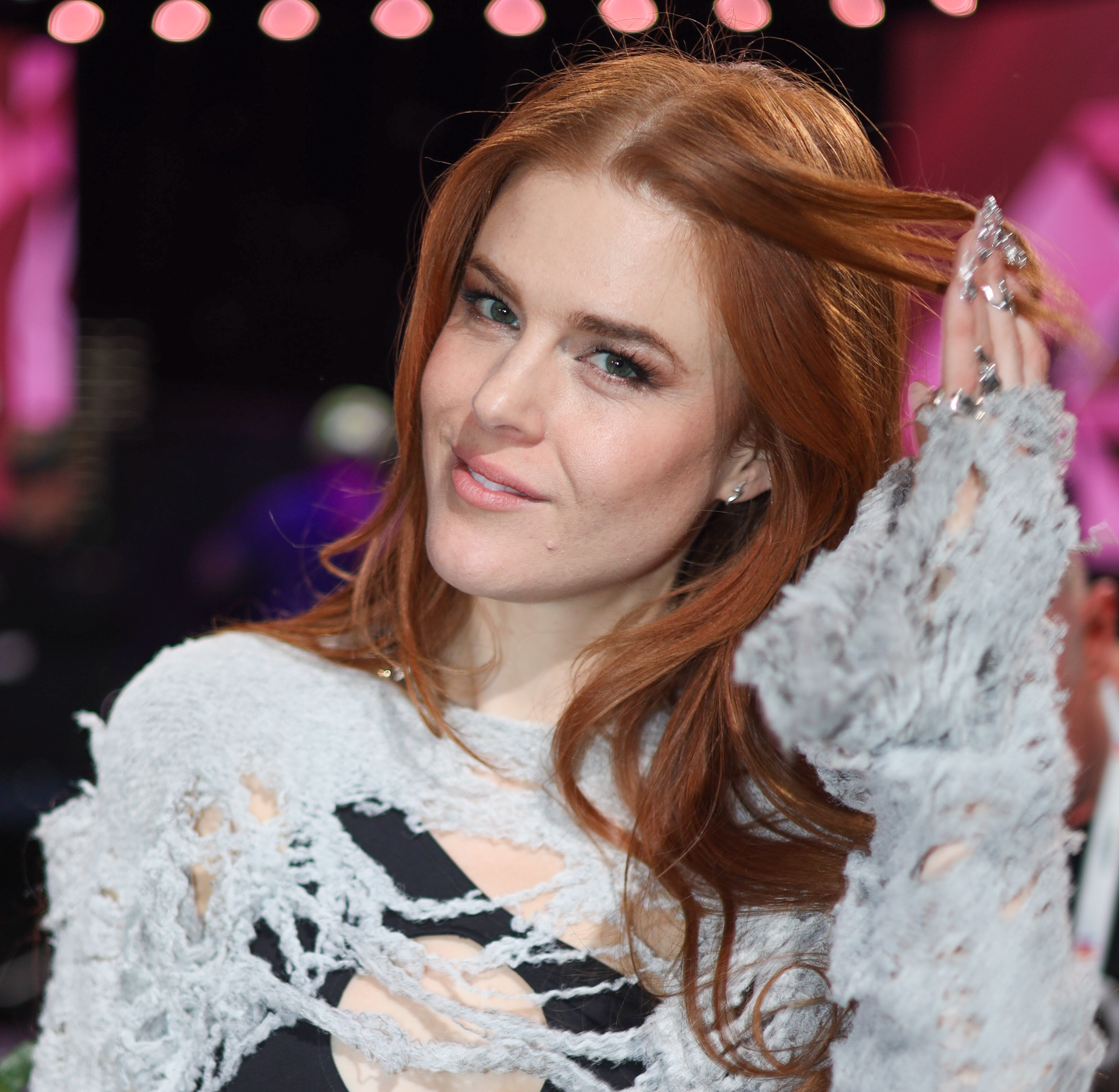
- Dotter in 2024

Background information
- Born: Johanna Maria Jansson; 10 June 1987 (age 39); Arvika, Sweden
- Genres: Indie pop; synth-pop
- Occupations: Singer; songwriter
- Years active: 2014–present
- Label: Warner Music Sweden

Johanna Maria Jansson (born 10 June 1987), better known by her stage name Dotter, is a Swedish singer and songwriter. She is best known for her participations in Melodifestivalen: placing second (one point behind the winner The Mamas) with "Bulletproof" at Melodifestivalen 2020, fourth with "Little Tot" at Melodifestivalen 2021, and twelfth with "It's Not Easy to Write a Love Song" at Melodifestivalen 2024.

== Career ==
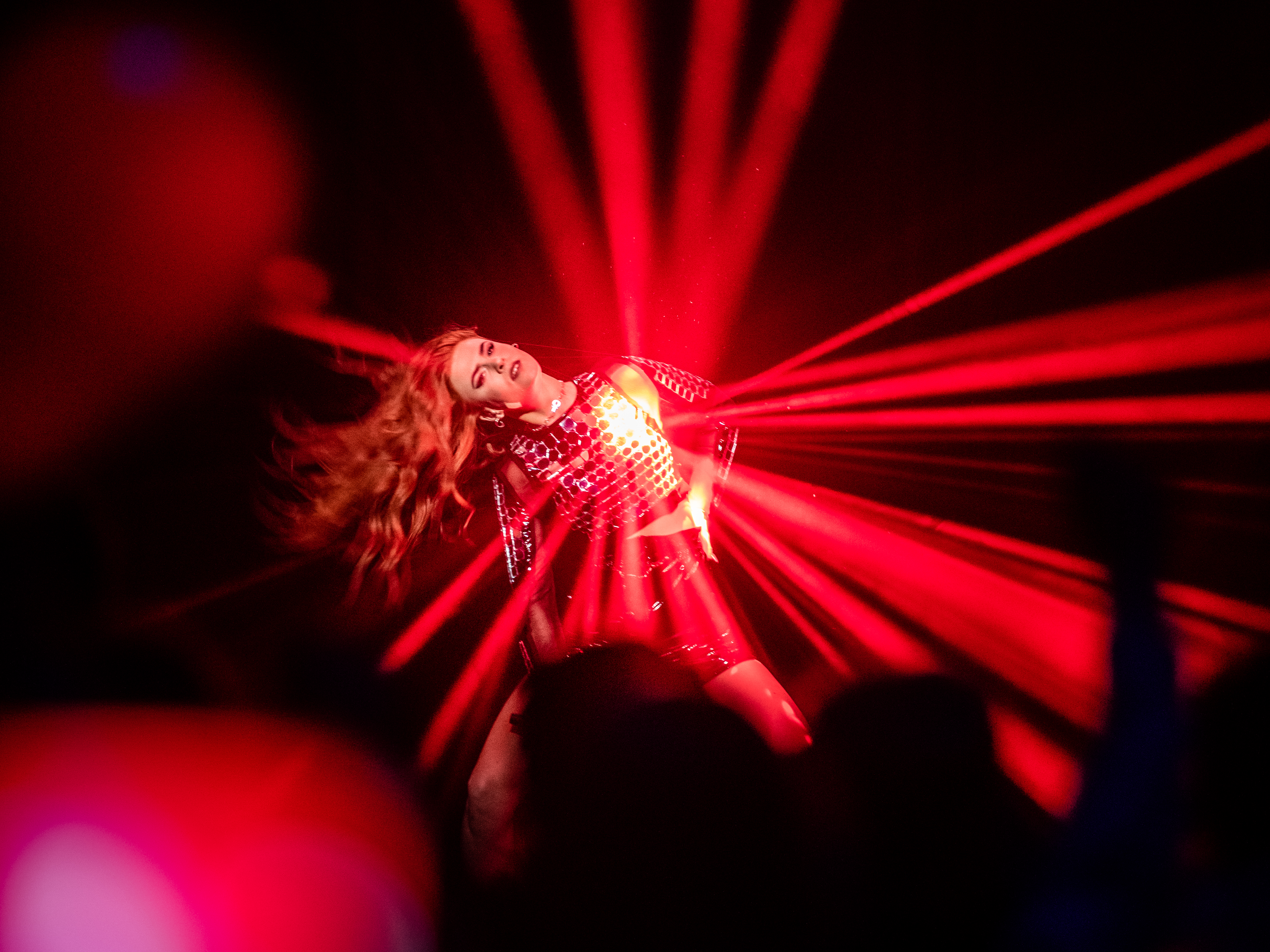
Dotter performing at Melodifestivalen 2020.

Dotter was born on 10 June 1987 in Arvika. She later moved to Stockholm and studied at the Kulturama music school. She chose the stage name "Dotter" (English: daughter) because she considers herself a "daughter of Mother Earth" due to her vegan lifestyle. She cites her major musical influences as Jefferson Airplane, Joni Mitchell, First Aid Kit, and Florence and the Machine. Her debut single "My Flower" was released in 2014, and she later performed at Musikhjälpen which was broadcast on SVT.

Dotter co-wrote the song "A Million Years" by Mariette Hansson for Melodifestivalen 2017. It went on to place fourth in the final. The following year, Dotter competed as a soloist in Melodifestivalen 2018 with the song "Cry". Despite being a favourite to win the competition, she placed sixth in her semi-final and was eliminated.

She co-wrote the song "Victorious" performed by Lina Hedlund in Melodifestivalen 2019. It went on to place eleventh in the final. In the same festival Dotter performed the duet "Walk with Me" along with Måns Zelmerlöw as an interval act during the Second Chance round.

She returned as a performer one year later, competing in Melodifestivalen 2020 with the song "Bulletproof"; Dotter competed in the second semi-final on 8 February, where she qualified directly for the final. She finished in second place, scoring a total of 136 points, one point behind the winning song.

She took part again in Melodifestivalen 2021, with the song "Little Tot". She qualified directly for the final from the second semi-final, alongside Anton Ewald. Despite being an early favourite to win the contest, she placed fourth in the final.

She is credited as a backing vocalist on the studio version of the Maltese entry at the Eurovision Song Contest 2022, "I Am What I Am", a song co-written by her fiancée Dino Medanhodžić and sung by Emma Muscat. She also announced the points on behalf of the Swedish jury at the contest.

She competed in Melodifestivalen 2024 with "It's Not Easy to Write a Love Song"; she came second in her heat on 24 February 2024, qualifying for the final. She ultimately finished last in the final on March 9.

In 2026, she returned once again to Melodifestivalen as a songwriter on the song "Ain't Today" performed by Saga Ludvigsson. It went on to place 12th in the final.

== Personal life ==
Dotter is vegan and an animal rights activist. She speaks four languages: Swedish, English, Spanish, and Bosnian. She is engaged to Bosnian-Swedish musician Dino Medanhodžić and gave birth to a daughter on 12 October 2022. Her pregnancy was publicly revealed during her appearance at the Eurovision Song Contest 2022 as the Swedish spokesperson to announce the 12-point score from the Swedish jury.

== Discography ==
=== Singles ===
Title	Year	Peak chart positions	Certification
Title	Year	SWE	Certification
"My Flower"	2014	—	
"Dive"	2015	—	
"Creatures of the Sun"	2016	—	
"Evolution"	2017	—	
"Rebellion"	2017	—	
"Cry"	2018	59	
"Heatwave"	2018	—	
"Walk with Me" (with Måns Zelmerlöw)	2019	51	
"I Do"	2019	—	
"Bulletproof"	2020	2	GLF: Platinum
"Backfire"	2020	—	
"I'm Sorry"	2020	—	
"Vintern jag var sexton"	2020	53	
"New Year"	2020	—	
"Little Tot"	2021	6	
"Jealous"	2021	—	
"(Just Can't) Hate U" (Ryan Riback featuring Dotter)	2021	—	
"Bon Voyage"	2022	—	
"Varför"	2022	—	
"Only Good Die Young"	2022	—	
"Lättdistraherad"	2022	—	
"Disobey" (Kaaze featuring Dotter)	2023	—	
"No Room for Love"	2023	—	
"It's Not Easy to Write a Love Song"	2024	9	
"Christmas Winter Heart" (with Lasse Skriver)	2024	— (Note: "Christmas Winter Heart" did not enter the Swedish Singles Chart, but peaked at number eight on the Swedish Heatseeker chart.)	
"Sirens"	2025	—	
"Cotton Eye Joe (Single And Free)" (with Stockholm Cowboys, Victor Crone and Stig Rästa)	2025	—	
"Like You Do" (with Tribbs, Sam Feldt and Andy Dust)	2025	—	
"—" denotes a recording that did not chart or was not released.
