= Tusse =

Congolese-Swedish singer (born 2002)

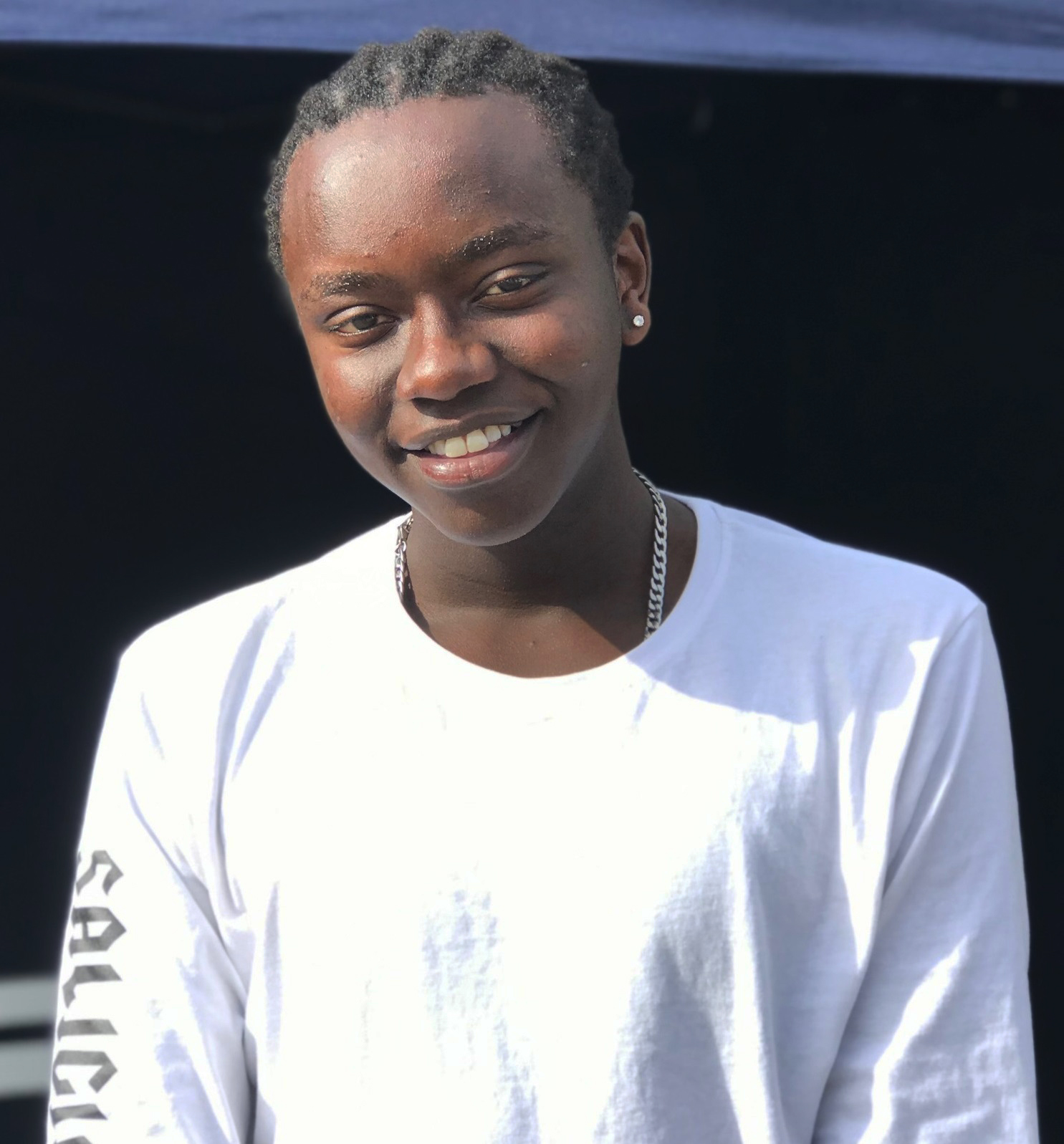
- Tusse in 2019

Background information
- Born: Toussaint Michael Chiza; 1 January 2002 (age 24); Kinshasa, Democratic Republic of the Congo
- Origin: Leksand, Sweden
- Genres: Pop; Soul
- Occupations: Singer; songwriter
- Years active: 2018–present
- Label: Universal Music AB

Toussaint Michael Chiza (born 1 January 2002), better known as Tusse, is a Congolese-Swedish singer who represented Sweden in the Eurovision Song Contest 2021.

== Life and career ==
Chiza was born in the Democratic Republic of the Congo. When he was five years old, he had to flee his country. He lived in Uganda in a refugee camp with his aunt for three years and then came to Sweden. There, he lived in the village of Kullsbjörken, near Leksand, where he has resided since 2015. He participated as a singer in the Swedish talent show Talang 2018 (as Tousin Chiza) which was also broadcast on TV4; he made it to the semi-finals before being eliminated.

He received praise for his semi-final performance from judge Bianca Ingrosso. Tusse was a finalist in Swedish Idol 2019, broadcast on TV4, alongside Freddie Liljegren, and was ultimately declared the winner in the final.

After winning Swedish Idol, he released three singles, two of them songs he performed on Idol: a cover of Whitney Houston's "How Will I Know" on 22 November 2019 as a Top 12 contestant. And as the winner, he released his version of the season's winning song, "Rain", on 3 December 2019. As a result of his victory, he got to release his debut single as a CD single as well as on the iTunes Store. His third single is called "Innan du går"

Tusse participated in Melodifestivalen 2021 with the song "Voices". He qualified directly to the final, scheduled for 13 March 2021, and ultimately won with 175 points. As a result, he represented Sweden in the Eurovision Song Contest 2021 in Rotterdam, the Netherlands.

After his first Eurovision rehearsal, Tusse was the victim of racist comments on social media.

In the semi-final, Tusse managed to qualify for the final on 22 May. In the final, he reached 14th place with his song. After Eurovision, he did an interview with the magazine Vanity Teen in which he talked about his personal life, his experience in Eurovision and his future career.

In June 2023, it was revealed that a film about Tusse's life was to be produced in 2024.

In January 2026, he came out as queer.

== Discography ==
=== Studio albums ===
Title	Details
It Takes a Village to Love a Child	Released: 8 May 2026; Label: Playground Music Scandinavia; Formats: Digital download, streaming

=== Singles ===
Title	Year	Peak chart positions						Certification	Album
Title	Year	SWE	IRE	LAT	NLD	NOR	UK Down.	Certification	Album
"How Will I Know"	2019	—	—	—	—	—	—		Non-album singles
"Rain"	2019	63	—	—	—	—	—	GLF: Gold	Non-album singles
"Innan du går"	2020	—	—	—	—	—	—		Non-album singles
"Jag tror på sommaren"	2020	—	—	—	—	—	—		Non-album singles
"Crash"	2020	—	—	—	—	—	—		Non-album singles
"Voices"	2021	1	99	2	56	11	31	GLF: 2× Platinum	Non-album singles
"Grow"	2021	—	—	—	—	—	—		Non-album singles
"This Is Our Christmas Song"	2021	— (Note: "This Is Our Christmas Song" did not enter the Swedish Singles Chart, but peaked at number four on the Swedish Heatseeker chart.)	—	—	—	—	—		Non-album singles
"Happiness Before Love"	2022	—	—	—	—	—	—		Non-album singles
"Dream of Gold"	2022	—	—	—	—	—	—		Non-album singles
"I Wanna Be Someone Who's Loved"	2022	—	—	—	—	—	—		Non-album singles
"Home"	2023	—	—	—	—	—	—		Non-album singles
"I Won't Spend Christmas On My Own"	2023	—	—	—	—	—	—		Non-album singles
"Motherland"	2026	—	—	—	—	—	—		It Takes a Village to Love a Child
"I Could Be Staring at Stars"	2026	—	—	—	—	—	—		It Takes a Village to Love a Child
"No Sinner No Saint"	2026	—	—	—	—	—	—		It Takes a Village to Love a Child
"—" denotes a recording that did not chart or was not released.

== Notes ==
Preceded by The Mamas with "Move"	Sweden in the Eurovision Song Contest; 2021	Succeeded by Cornelia Jakobs with "Hold Me Closer"
