= Every Minute =

Single by Eric Saade
- Released: 27 February 2021
- Genre: Electronic; R&B
- Length: 3:02
- Label: Giant
- Songwriters: Eric Saade; Linnea Deb; Joy Deb; Jimmy "Joker" Thörnfeldt

Eric Saade singles chronology
| "Nån som du" (2020) | "Every Minute" (2021) | "Day & Night" (2021) |

Music video
- "Every Minute" on YouTube

"Every Minute" is a song by Swedish singer Eric Saade. It was released on 27 February 2021 as the lead single from his upcoming sixth studio album. The song was written by Saade, Linnea Deb, Jimmy "Joker" Thörnfeldt, and Joy Deb, who also handled the production. On 27 February 2021, the song was performed in the fourth heat in Melodifestivalen 2021, where it made it through to the final on 13 March 2021. He finished second overall in the Melodifestivalen final, while Tusse qualified to represent Sweden in Eurovision Song Contest 2021.

"Every Minute" peaked at number four in Sweden, becoming Saade's best-charting song in ten years, since "Hearts in the Air" peaked at number two in the country.

== Track listing ==
- Digital download
1. "Every Minute" – 3:02
- Digital download - Acoustic Version
1. "Every Minute" (Acoustic Version) (featuring STO CULTR) - 3:54

== Charts ==
=== Weekly charts ===
Weekly chart performance for "Every Minute"
| Chart (2021) | Peak position |
|---|---|
| Sweden (Sverigetopplistan) | 4 |

=== Year-end charts ===
Year-end chart performance for "Every Minute"
| Chart (2021) | Position |
|---|---|
| Sweden (Sverigetopplistan) | 95 |
