= Bobby Ljunggren =

Swedish songwriter (born 1961)

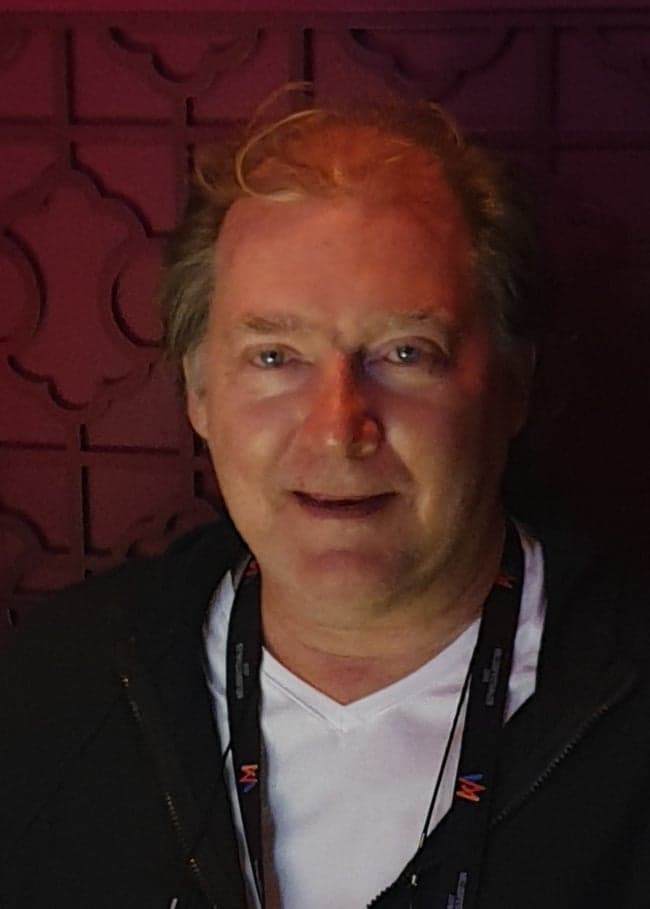
- Born: 6 June 1961 (age 65); Johannes parish, Sweden
- Spouse: Maria Ljunggren Molin

Bobby Ljunggren (born 6 June 1961) is a Swedish songwriter. He has entered the Eurovision Song Contest as a composer six times, five times for his native Sweden (1995, 1998, 2006, 2008 and 2010), and once for Lithuania, in 2005. He is a veteran of the Melodifestivalen competition, with 50 entries, reaching the milestone of half a century of entries at Melodifestivalen 2020. In Melodifestivalen 2008, he co-wrote both the winning song and the songs placing second and third.

== Eurovision Song Contest national finals entries ==
Melodifestivalen entries (Sweden)

Year	Artist	Title	Co-written with	Result
1987	Cyndee Peters	"När morgonstjärnan brinner"	Håkan Almqvist, Ingela "Pling" Forsman	3rd
1988	Lena Philipsson	"Om igen"	Ingela "Pling" Forsman	2nd
1989	Lisa Nilsson	"Du (öppnar min värld)"	Ingela "Pling" Forsman, Håkan Almqvist	4th
1991	Towe Jaarnek	"Ett liv med dej"	Ingela "Pling" Forsman, Håkan Almqvist	2nd
1995	Jan Johansen	"Se på mig"	Ingela "Pling" Forsman, Håkan Almqvist	1st
1998	Jill Johnson	"Kärleken är"	Ingela "Pling" Forsman, Håkan Almqvist	1st
2000	Hanna Hedlund	"Anropar försvunnen"	Robert Uhlmann, Anna-Lena Högdahl	8th
2001	Jan Johansen	"Ingenmansland"	Ingela "Pling" Forsman, Håkan Almqvist	4th
2003	Alcazar	"Not a Sinner nor a Saint"	Lotta Ahlin, Tommy Lydell	3rd
2003	Aleena	"Better Believe It"	Anna-Lena Högdahl, Tommy Lydell	6th (Semi-final)
2003	Barbados	"Bye Bye"	Lotta Ahlin, Tommy Lydell	10th
2003	Sahlene	"We're Unbreakable"	Anna-Lena Högdahl, Robert Olausson	5th (Semi-final)
2003	Shirley Clamp	"Mr. Memory"	Lotta Ahlin, Tommy Lydell	6th (Semi-final)
2004	Bosson	"Efharisto"	Ingela "Pling" Forsman, Henrik Wikström	Second Chance
2004	Shirley Champ	"Min kärlek"	Ingela "Pling" Forsman, Henrik Wikström	2nd
2005	Fredrik Kempe & Sanna Nielsen	"Du och jag mot världen"	Fredrik Kempe, Henrik Wikström	8th
2005	Josef	"Rain"	Annelie Martin, Martin Blix, Henrik Wikström	5th (Semi-final)
2005	Papa Dee	"My No. 1"	Daniel Wahlgren, Marcos Ubeda	6th (Semi-final)
2005	Shirley Clamp	"Att älska dig"	Sonja Aldén, Shirley Clamp, Robert Olausson, Henrik Wikström	4th
2006	Anna Sahlene	"This Woman"	Anna Sahlene, Henrik Wikström	5th (Semi-final)
2006	Carola	"Evighet"	Carola Häggkvist, Thomas G:son, Henrik Wikström	1st
2006	Niclas Wahlgren	"En droppe regn"	Ingela "Pling" Forsman, Henrik Wikström	Second Chance
2006	Sonya	"Etymon"	Ingela "Pling" Forsman, Henrik Wikström	5th (Semi-final)
2007	Regina Lund	"Rainbow Star"	Fredrik Kempe, Regina Lund	8th (Semi-final)
2007	Sanna Nielsen	"Vågar du, vågar jag"	Fredrik Kempe, Henrik Wikström	7th
2007	Sonja Aldén	"För att du finns"	Sonja Aldén	6th
2007	Svante Thuresson & Anne-Lie Rydé	"Första gången"	Dan Sundqvist, Sonja Aldén	6th (Semi-final)
2008	Ainbusk	"Jag saknar dig ibland"	Ingela "Pling" Forsman, Henrik Wikström	6th (Semi-final)
2008	BWO	"Lay Your Love on Me"	Alexander Bard, Anders Hansson, Henrik Wikström	3rd
2008	Charlotte Perrelli	"Hero"	Fredrik Kempe	1st
2008	Sanna Nielsen	"Empty Room"	Aleena Gibson	2nd
2008	Suzzie Tapper	"Visst finns mirakel"	Amir Aly, Maciel Numhauser, Robin Abrahamsson, Suzzie Tapper	Second Chance
2009	Amy Diamond	"It's My Life"	Alexander Bard, Oscar Holter	Second Chance
2009	Molly Sandén	"Så vill stjärnorna"	Marcos Ubeda, Ingela "Pling" Forsman	11th
2009	Shirley Clamp	"Med hjärtat fyllt av ljus"	Henrik Wikström, Ingela "Pling" Forsman	8th (Semi-final)
2009	Susanne Alfvengren	"Du är älskad där du går"	Henrik Wikström, Ingela "Pling" Forsman	8th (Semi-final)
2010	Andreas Johnson	"We Can Work It Out"	Andreas Johnson, Marcos Ubeda	6th
2010	Anna Bergendahl	"This Is My Life"	Kristian Lagerström	1st
2011	Sanna Nielsen	"I'm in Love"	Thomas G:son, Irini Michas, Peter Boström	4th
2011	Shirley's Angels	"I Thought It Was Forever"	Robin Abrahamsson, Alexander Bard, Henrik Wikström	Second Chance
2012	Sonja Aldén	"I din himmel"	Sonja Aldén, Peter Boström	6th (Semi-final)
2014	Elisa Lindström	"Casanova"	Ingela "Pling" Forsman, Jimmy Jansson	5th (Semi-final)
2014	Helena Paparizou	"Survivor"	Henrik Wikström, Karl-Ola Kjellholm, Sharon Vaughn	4th
2014	Shirley Clamp	"Burning Alive"	Marcos Ubeda, Sharon Vaughn, Henrik Wikström	6th (Semi-final)
2015	Andreas Johnson	"Living to Die"	Andreas Johnson, Karl-Ola Kjellholm	7th (Semi-final)
2016	Robin Bengtsson	"Constellation Prize"	Henrik Wikström, Mark Hole, Martin Eriksson	5th
2018	Felicia Olsson	"Break That Chain"	Kristian Lagerström, Joy Deb	7th (Semi-final)
2019	Anna Bergendahl	"Ashes to Ashes"	Thomas G:son, Erik Bernholm, Anna Bergendahl	10th
2020	Anna Bergendahl	"Kingdom Come"	Thomas G:son, Erik Bernholm, Anna Bergendahl	3rd
2020	Sonja Aldén	"Sluta aldrig gå"	David Lindgren Zacharias, Sonja Aldén	5th (Semi-final)
2021	Arvingarna	"Tänker inte alls gå hem"	Stefan Brunzell, Nanne Grönvall, Thomas G:son	9th
2021	Charlotte Perrelli	"Still Young"	Thomas G:son, Erik Bernholm, Charlie Gustavsson	8th
2021	Clara Klingenström	"Behöver inte dig idag"	Clara Klingenström, David Lindgren Zacharias	5th
2021	Elisa Lindström	"Den du är"	Ingela "Pling" Forsman, Elisa Lindström	7th (Semi-final)
2021	Frida Green	"The Silence"	Anna Bergendahl, David Lindgren Zacharias, Joy Deb	Second Chance
2022	Anna Bergendahl	"Higher Power"	Anna Bergendahl, Thomas G:son, Erik Bernholm	12th
2022	Tenori	"La stella"	Dan Sundquist, Kristian Lagerström, Marcos Ubeda, Sarah Börjesson Wassberg	5th (Semi-final)
2024	Clara Klingenström	"Aldrig mer"	Clara Klingenström, David Lindgren Zacharias	5th (Heat)

Lithuanian national finals entries

Year	Artist	Title	Co-written with	Result
2005	Laura & The Lovers	"Little by Little"	William Butt	1st
2012	Simona Milinytė	"One of a Kind"	Fredrik Westin, Marcos Ubeda	7th

Eurosong entries (Belgium)

Year	Artist	Title	Co-written with	Result
2008	Tanya Dexters	"Addicted to You"	Thomas G:son, Henrik Wikström	5th (Semi-final)

Dansk Melodi Grand Prix entries (Denmark)

Year	Artist	Title	Co-written with	Result
2015	Cecilie Alexandra	"Hotel A"	Marcos Ubeda, Kristian Lagerström	4th

Uuden Musiikin Kilpailu entries (Finland)

Year	Artist	Title	Co-written with	Result
2018	Saara Aalto	"Domino"	Thomas G:son, Johnny Sanchez, Will Taylor, Saara Aalto	2nd

Eesti Laul entries (Estonia)

Year	Artist	Title	Co-written with	Result
2025	Anna Sahlene	"Love Me Low"	David Lindgren Zacharias, Michaela Stridbeck, Anna Sahlin, Dagmar Oja, Kaire Vilgats	14th
