= The Mamas =

Swedish soul and gospel group

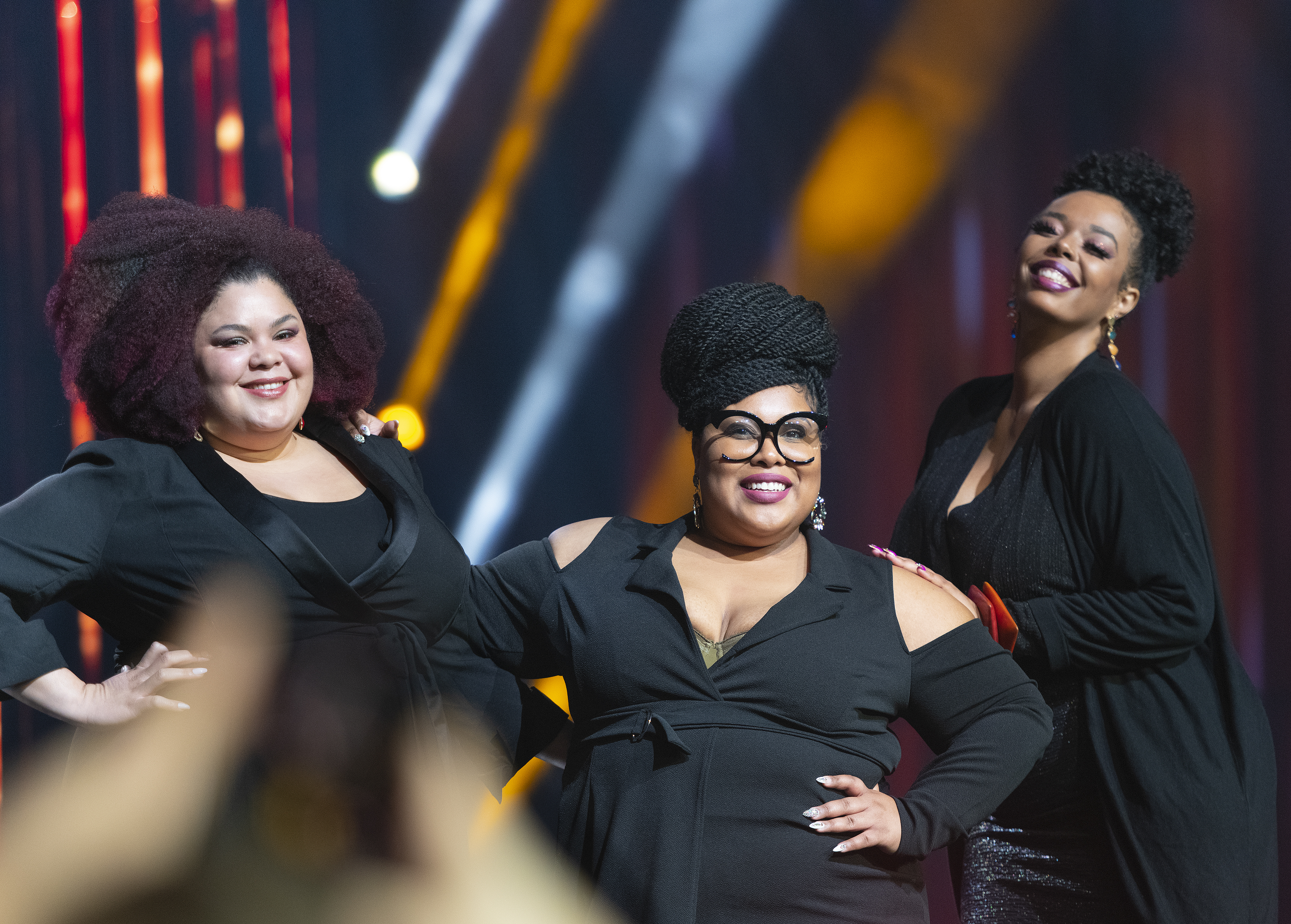
- LaMotte, Haynes and Yonas Manna at a Melodifestivalen press conference in 2020.

Background information
- Origin: Sweden and United States
- Genres: Pop; Soul
- Years active: 2019–2023 (Note: Indefinite hiatus)
- Label: Universal Music Sweden
- Members: Ashley Haynes; Loulou LaMotte; Dinah Yonas Manna
- Past members: Paris Renita

The Mamas were a Swedish-American pop and soul group. They won Melodifestivalen 2020 with their single "Move", which reached number one in Sweden in March 2020.

== Career ==
The group consists of Ashley Haynes (born 19 January 1987 in Washington, D.C.), Loulou LaMotte (born 16 April 1981 in Malmö) and Dinah Yonas Manna (born 5 September 1981 in Stockholm). Founding member Paris Renita left the group in 2019.

As a four-piece, the group provided backing vocals for John Lundvik's Melodifestivalen 2019 entry "Too Late for Love". Lundvik went on to win the competition and got to represent Sweden in the Eurovision Song Contest 2019 held in Tel Aviv, Israel, with the Mamas continuing to provide backing vocals. The song finished 5th in the grand final on 18 May 2019.

In late 2019, it was announced that the Mamas (without Paris Renita) would take part in Melodifestivalen in 2020, this time in their own right with their entry "Move". They performed in the first heat on 1 February 2020 in Linköping, and qualified directly for the final that took place on 7 March 2020 in the Friends Arena in Stockholm.

The Mamas went on to win Melodifestivalen 2020 with a total of 137 points, earning the right to represent Sweden in the Eurovision Song Contest 2020 held in Rotterdam, Netherlands. However, the contest was cancelled in March 2020 due to the COVID-19 pandemic.

They returned the following year and participated in Melodifestivalen 2021 with the song "In the Middle". They performed in the fourth heat on 27 February 2021 and qualified directly for the final which was held on 13 March 2021 at the Annexet in Stockholm. The Mamas finished in 3rd place in the final with a total of 106 points.

The Mamas played on the Swedish Socialdemocratic Workers Party international workers day celebrations in May 2021. In November 2021, they released their third EP Won't Let the Sun Go Down.

In April 2023, the Mamas announced that they would go on indefinite hiatus to pursue their solo careers.

== Discography ==
=== Extended plays ===
Title	Details	Peak chart positions
Title	Details	SWE
Tomorrow Is Waiting	Released: 25 September 2020; Format: Digital download, streaming; Label: Universal Music	—
All I Want for December	Released: 21 November 2020; Format: Digital download, streaming; Label: Universal Music	19
Won't Let the Sun Go Down	Released: 12 November 2021; Format: Digital download, streaming; Label: Universal Music	—
"—" denotes a recording that did not chart or was not released.

=== Singles ===
Title	Year	Peak chart positions			Certification	Album
Title	Year	SWE	SCO	UK Down.	Certification	Album
"When You Wish Upon a Star"	2019	— (Note: "When You Wish Upon a Star" did not enter the Swedish Singellista Chart, but peaked at number five on the Swedish Heatseeker Chart.)	—	—		We Love Disney
"Move"	2020	1	52	55	GLF: Platinum	Non-album single
"Let It Be"	2020	—	—	—		Tomorrow Is Waiting
"Touch the Sky"	2020	—	—	—		Tomorrow Is Waiting
"A Christmas Night to Remember"	2020	88	—	—		All I Want for December
"In the Middle"	2021	9	—	—		non album singles
"Itsy Bitsy Teenie Weenie Yellow Polka Dot Bikini"	2021	—	—	—		non album singles
"Sun Goes Down"	2021	—	—	—		Won't Let the Sun Go Down
"Say So" (with Ash Haynes)	2021	—	—	—		Won't Let the Sun Go Down
"Just a Little" (with Dinah Yonas Manna)	2021	—	—	—		Won't Let the Sun Go Down
"Don't Kill the Groove" (with LouLou LaMotte)	2021	—	—	—		Won't Let the Sun Go Down
"—" denotes a recording that did not chart or was not released.

=== Other charted songs ===
Title	Year	Peak chart positions	Album
Title	Year	SWE Heat.	Album
"Shine a Light"	2020	7	All I Want for December

== Notes ==
Preceded by John Lundvik with "Too Late for Love"	Melodifestivalen winner 2020	Succeeded by Tusse with "Voices"
