= Voices (Tusse song) =

2021 single by Tusse

Single by Tusse
- Released: 27 February 2021
- Genre: Electro-pop
- Length: 3:04
- Label: Universal
- Songwriters: Joy Deb; Linnea Deb; Jimmy "Joker" Thörnfeldt; Anderz Wrethov

Tusse singles chronology
"Crash" (2020)	"Voices" (2021)	"Grow" (2021)

Music video
- "Voices" on YouTube

Eurovision Song Contest 2021 entry
- Country: Sweden
- Artist: Tusse
- Languages: English
- Composers: Joy Deb; Linnea Deb; Jimmy "Joker" Thörnfeldt; Anderz Wrethov
- Lyricists: Joy Deb; Linnea Deb; Jimmy "Joker" Thörnfeldt; Anderz Wrethov

Finals performance
- Semi-final result: 7th
- Semi-final points: 142
- Final result: 14th
- Final points: 109

Entry chronology
- ◄ "Move" (2020)
- "Hold Me Closer" (2022) ►

"Voices" is a song performed by Congolese-Swedish singer Tusse, composed by Joy Deb, Linnea Deb, Jimmy "Joker" Thörnfeldt and Anderz Wrethov. The song competed in Melodifestivalen 2021, where it made it through to the final on 13 March 2021. The song received the most points from both the viewers and the international jury in the final and won the final with 175 points, 57 points ahead of the runner-up. It represented Sweden in the Eurovision Song Contest 2021 in Rotterdam. Following the song's win at Melodifestivalen, it ascended to number one on the Swedish Sverigetopplistan chart. It was later certified Platinum by the Swedish Recording Industry Association.

In the semi-final, the song managed to qualify for the final on 22 May. In the final the song placed 14th, breaking Sweden's streak of top 10 entries since 2013, thus giving the country their lowest result in eight years.

Tusse also released a French language version of the song. He has declared: "It's a huge pleasure for me to be able to release "Voices" in French. It's a song that means a lot to me and have inspired me much. So, it feels very special and genuine to sing the song in French, especially because French is my mother tongue and it's the first language I ever spoke".

== Charts ==
=== Weekly charts ===
Weekly chart performance for "Voices"
Chart (2021)	Peak position
Belgium (Ultratip Bubbling Under Flanders)	11
Greece (IFPI)	93
Iceland (Tónlistinn)	16
Ireland (IRMA)	99
Latvia (EHR)	2
Lithuania (AGATA)	19
Netherlands (Single Top 100)	56
Norway (VG-lista)	11
Sweden (Sverigetopplistan)	1
Switzerland (Schweizer Hitparade)	66
UK Singles Downloads (OCC)	31

=== Year-end charts ===
Year-end chart performance for "Voices"
Chart (2021)	Position
Sweden (Sverigetopplistan)	11

== Certifications ==
Certifications for "Voices"
Region	Certification	Certified units/sales
Streaming
Sweden (GLF)	2× Platinum	16,000,000^{†}
^{†} Streaming-only figures based on certification alone.
