= Nathalie Brydolf =

Swedish singer

Nathalie Brydolf (born 25 April 1995) is a Swedish singer who participated in Idol 2018, broadcast on TV4, placing 6th.

She participated in Melodifestivalen 2021 with the song "Fingerprints".

== Discography ==
=== Singles ===
Title	Year	Peak chart positions	Album
Title	Year	SWE	Album
"Fingerprints"	2021	93	Non-album single
