= Klara Hammarström =

Swedish singer

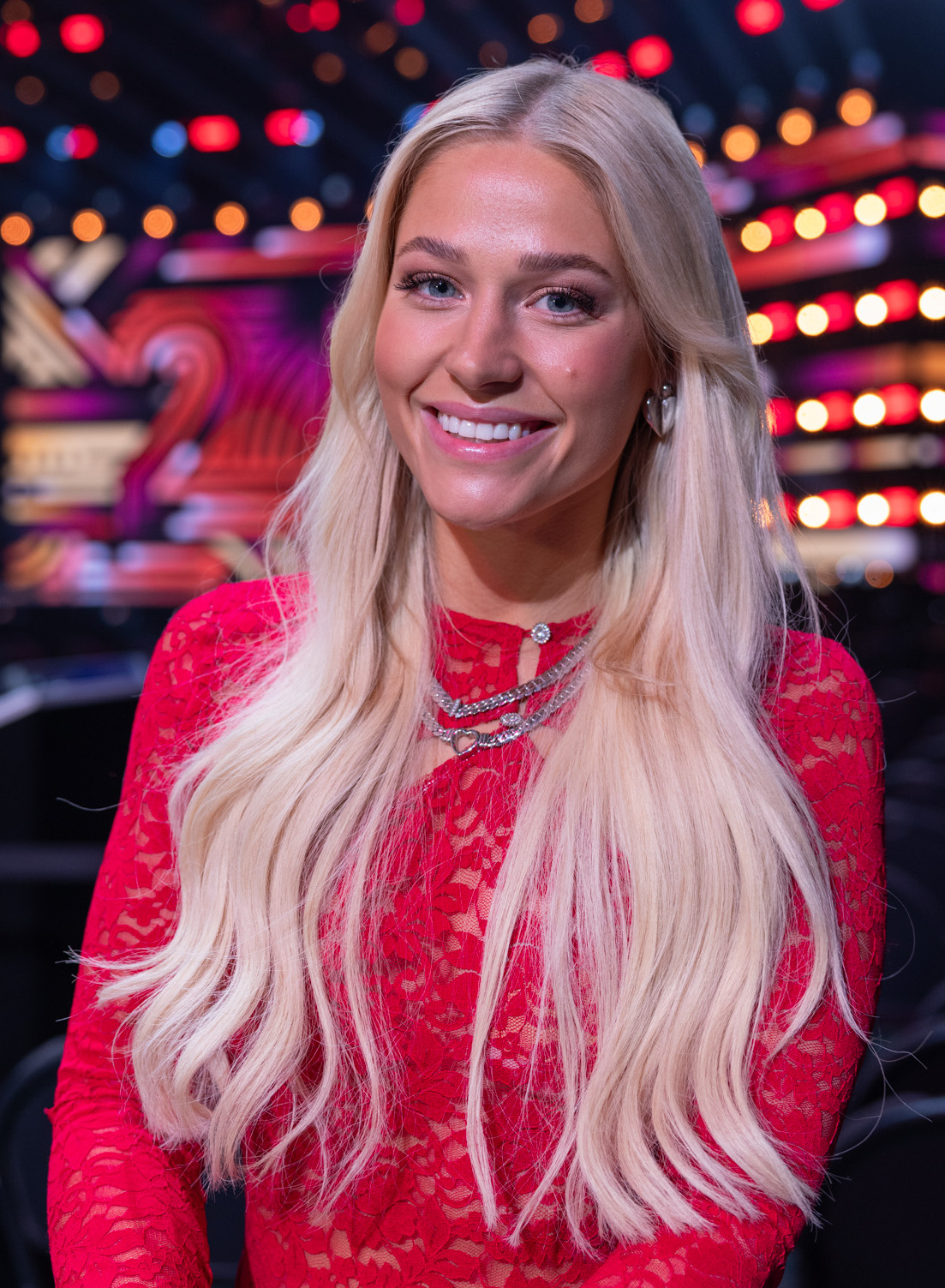
- Hammarström in 2025

Background information
- Born: Klara Lovisa Hammarström; 20 April 2000 (age 26); Stockholm, Sweden
- Occupation: Singer
- Years active: 2019–present

Klara Lovisa Hammarström (born 20 April 2000) is a Swedish singer and television personality. She has competed in Melodifestivalen on four occasions, most recently in 2025 with the song "On and On and On".

== Career ==
=== Music ===
Hammarström has participated in Melodifestivalen on four occasions. She first competed in Melodifestivalen 2020 with the song "Nobody", which failed to qualify from the semi-finals. She participated in the 2021 contest with the song "Beat of Broken Hearts", finishing in sixth place in the grand final with 79 points. She returned in 2022 with the song "Run to the Hills", again finishing in sixth place with 83 points.

She most recently competed in Melodifestivalen 2025 with the song "On and On and On", finishing in fourth place with 77 points.

Melodifestivalen results
Year	Song	Result
2020	"Nobody"	5th place in Heat 2, failed to qualify for the final
2021	"Beat of Broken Hearts"	6th place, 79 points
2022	"Run to the Hills"	6th place, 83 points
2025	"On and On and On"	4th place, 77 points

=== Television ===
Hammarström appeared alongside her family in the SVT reality series Familjen Hammarström (2018–2020).

In 2023, Hammarström won Masked Singer Sverige season 3 as Karamellen (Caramel). In 2024, participated at the Vasaloppet as a "skiing reporter".

== Personal life ==
She was previously a competitive horse rider.

== Discography ==
=== Singles ===
Title	Year	Peak chart positions	
Title	Year	SWE	POL Air.
"Break Up Song"	2019	—	—
"You Should Know Me Better"	2019	—	—
"Riding Home for Christmas"	2019	—	—
"Nobody"	2020	100	—
"The One" (with Mohombi)	2020	—	—
"Oh My Oh My"	2020	—	—
"DNA"	2020	—	—
"Beat of Broken Hearts"	2021	10	—
"Guld, svett & tårar" (with Liamoo)	2022	—	—
"Run to the Hills"	2022	1	—
"Bang My Head"	2022	94	—
"Everytime We Touch"	2023	—	—
"One of Us"	2024	—	—
"Mad"	2024	—	—
"Do It for Love"	2024	—	—
"Til It Feels Alright"	2024	—	—
"Can't Get Enough (Doctor Feelgood)" (with Tribbs)	2024	—	11
"On and On and On"	2025	1	—
"—" denotes a recording that did not chart or was not released
