= Dandi dansa =

Single by Danny Saucedo
- Released: 27 February 2021
- Length: 2:59
- Label: Chiliboy Productions
- Songwriters: Danny Saucedo; Karl-Johan Råsmark

Danny Saucedo singles chronology
"Kungar av December" (2020)	"Dandi dansa" (2021)	"Fan va har vi gjort..." (2021)

"Dandi dansa" is a song by Swedish singer Danny Saucedo. It was performed in Melodifestivalen 2021 and made it to the final on 13 March, where it ended 7th place with 74 points. It is Saucedo's first Swedish Top 10 hit in half a decade.

== Charts ==
Chart performance for "Dandi dansa"
Chart (2021)	Peak position
Sweden (Sverigetopplistan)	7
