= New Religion (Anton Ewald song) =

Single by Anton Ewald
- Released: 27 February 2021
- Length: 2:58
- Label: Instakarma
- Songwriters: Jonas Wallin; Joe Killington; Anton Ewald; Maja Strömstedt

Anton Ewald singles chronology
"She Don't" (2017)	"New Religion" (2021)	"DeLorean" (2021)

"New Religion" is a song by Swedish singer Anton Ewald. It was performed in Melodifestivalen 2021 and made it to the 13 March final.

== Charts ==
Chart performance for "New Religion"
Chart (2021)	Peak position
Sweden (Sverigetopplistan)	11
