= Still Young =

Single by Charlotte Perrelli
- Released: 27 February 2021
- Length: 3:00
- Label: Stockhouse – X5 Music Group
- Songwriters: Thomas G:son; Bobby Ljunggren; Erik Bernholm; Charlie Gustavsson

Charlotte Perrelli singles chronology
"Diva to Diva" (2019)	"Still Young" (2021)

"Still Young" is a song by Swedish singer Charlotte Perrelli. It was performed in Melodifestivalen 2021 and made it to the 13 March final. "Still Young" became Perrelli's eighth top-40 single in Sweden.

== Charts ==
Chart performance for "Still Young"
Chart (2021)	Peak position
Sweden (Sverigetopplistan)	19
