= Clara Klingenström =

Swedish singer

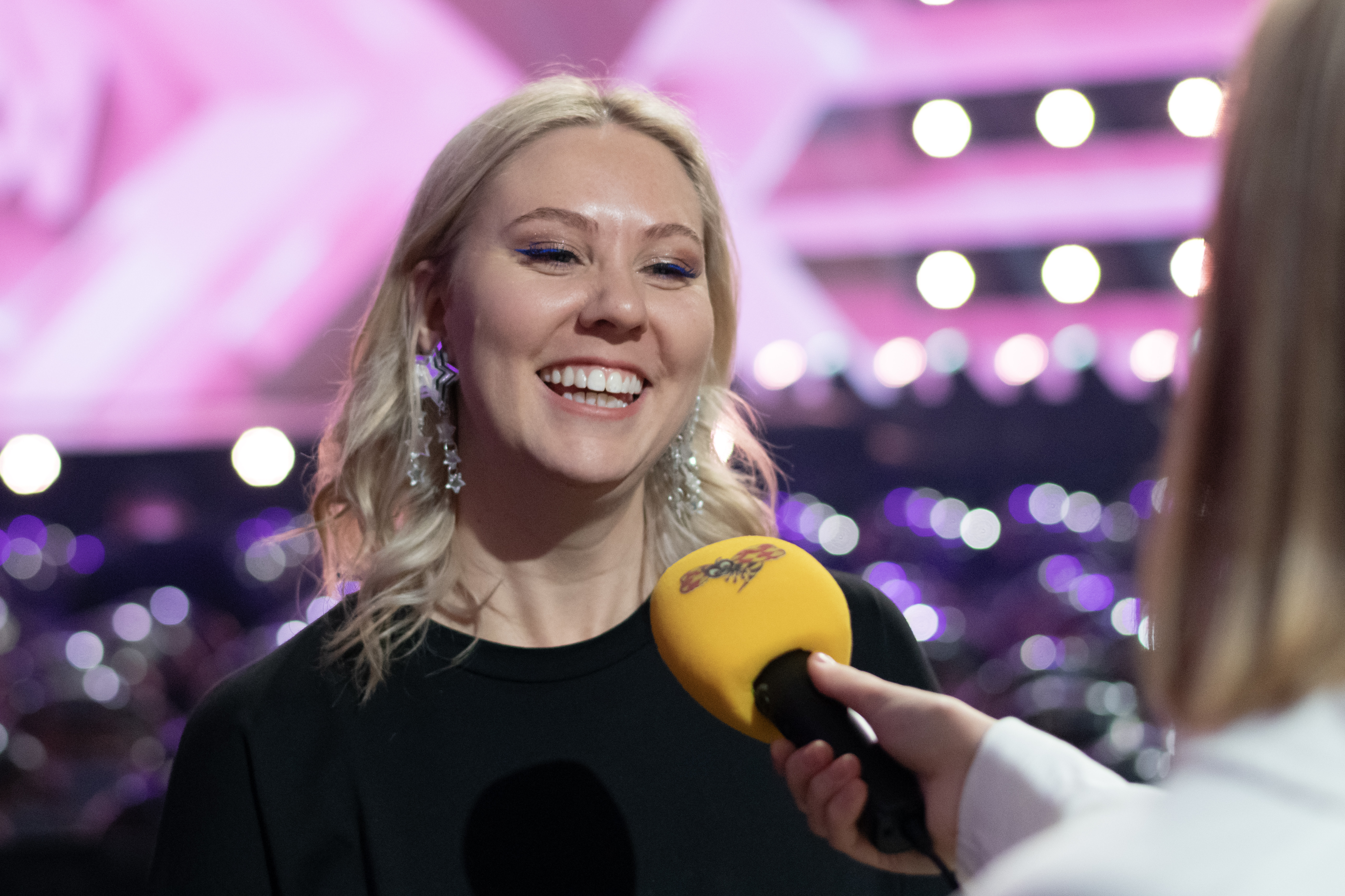
- Photo: Olivia Huerta

Background information
- Born: Emma Clara Idun Klingenström; 21 February 1995 (age 31); Visby, Sweden
- Genres: Pop
- Occupations: Singer; songwriter
- Years active: 2010–present
- Labels: Freebird Entertainment; Warner Music Sweden

Emma Clara Idun Klingenström (Swedish pronunciation: [ˈklɑ̂ːra ˈklɪ̂ŋːɛnˌstrœm]; born 21 February 1995) is a Swedish singer-songwriter. She started her music career in 2010 and 2015 after winning the Gotland region final of the music competition Musik Direkt.

== Career ==
In 2010, Klingenström participated in the web wildcard contest of Melodifestivalen 2011 with the song "Mr Lonely Man" and made it among the top 100 entries. Klingenström won the Gotland region of the music competition Svensktoppen nästa, held by Sveriges Radio P4 with the song "It Makes Me Crazy" in 2012.

Klingenström participated in Melodifestivalen 2021 with the song "Behöver inte dig idag" which she co-wrote with Bobby Ljunggren and David Lindgren Zacharias, advancing to the Andra chansen round. She then made it to the final held on 13 March. In the Swedish final she finished in fifth place.

On 13 August 2021, Clara released her new personal single 'Liv' one year after her father's death. The song reached 18th place on ITunes Charts.

In 2021, Clara won the Swedish music award Rockbjörnen.

In 2024, she participated again in Melodifestivalen with the song "Aldrig mer", also co-written with Ljunggren and Lindgren Zacharias; she was eliminated in her heat on 17 February 2024.

== Discography ==
=== Studio albums ===
- Claras dagbok (2021)

=== Singles ===
Title	Year	Peak chart positions	Certification	Album
Title	Year	SWE	Certification	Album
"Ensam i en stad"	2019	—		Claras dagbok
"Engelbrekts väg"	2019	—		Claras dagbok
"Sthlm, allt är förlorat"	2020	—		Non-album single
"Sommarminnen"	2020	—		Claras dagbok
"Så slut"	2020	—		Non-album single
"Behöver inte dig idag"	2021	3	GLF: Platinum	Claras dagbok
"Liv"	2021	—		Claras dagbok
"Se mig, bara se mig"	2021	—		Claras dagbok
"Nu kan du få mig så lätt"	2022	— (Note: "Nu kan du få mig så lätt" did not enter the Swedish Singellista Chart, but peaked at number 20 on the Swedish Heatseeker Chart.)		Non-album singles
"Jag vill inte ha dig tillbaks" (with Lancelot)	2022	—		Non-album singles
"Hångel på balkongen"	2022	— (Note: "Hångel på balkongen" did not enter the Swedish Singellista Chart, but peaked at number 18 on the Swedish Heatseeker Chart.)		Non-album singles
"Så bra som nu"	2023	—		Non-album singles
"Kan nått fint få hända sen" (with Oscar Zia)	2023	—		Non-album singles
"Aldrig mer"	2024	— (Note: "Aldrig mer" did not enter the Swedish Singellista Chart, but peaked at number two on the Swedish Heatseeker Chart.)		Non-album singles
"Blinka lilla stjärna" (with Stjärnfamiljen)	2024	—		Non-album singles
"Andas"	2024	—		Non-album singles
"Samma gamla visa" (with Björn Holmgren)	2025	—		Non-album singles
"—" denotes a recording that did not chart or was not released.
