= Tänker inte alls gå hem =

Single by Arvingarna

from the album Tänker inte alls gå hem
- Released: 27 February 2021
- Length: 3:00
- Label: Sony
- Songwriters: Stefan Brunzell; Nanne Grönvall; Thomas G:son; Bobby Ljunggren

Arvingarna singles chronology
"Säg att du är min" (2020)	"Tänker inte alls gå hem" (2021)	"Sommar igen" (2021)

"Tänker inte alls gå hem" is a song by Swedish dansband Arvingarna. It was performed in Melodifestivalen 2021 and made it to the 13 March final. The song is included on Arvingarna's studio album of the same name, set for release on 13 August 2021.

== Charts ==
Chart performance for "Tänker inte alls gå hem"
Chart (2021)	Peak position
Sweden (Sverigetopplistan)	24
