= Medina (duo) =

Swedish hip hop and rap duo

- Alibi (left) and Sami (right) in 2022

Background information
- Origin: Sweden
- Genre: Hip hop
- Years active: 2003–2018; 2021–present
- Members: Sam-E (Sami Daniel Rekik); Alibi (Ali Jammali)
- Website: www.medinaonline.se

Medina is a Swedish hip hop duo formation with Arabic influences made up of Swedish artists of Tunisian descent, being Sam-E (born Sami Daniel Rekik), a former professional football player in Tunisia and Alibi (born Ali Jammali). Sam-E is also of Finnish descent as his mother is Finnish.

== Career ==
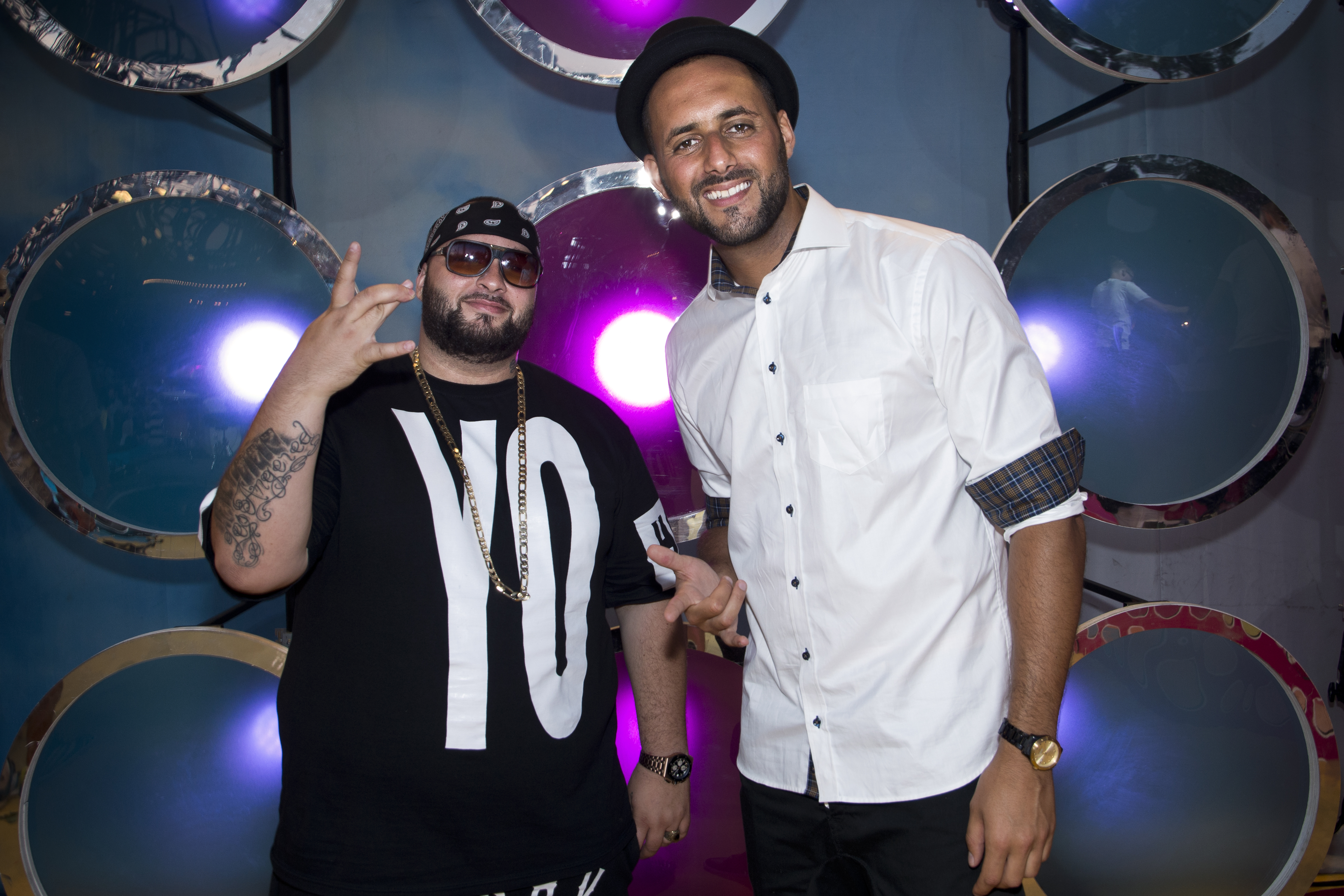
Medina in 2014.

The duo performing in the Melodifestivalen 2022.

The two started making music in 2003 under the name Medina after they met in Knivsta promoting a special genre they called "Haffla music" with rhythm from the Arab World mixed with hip hop.

Their debut release was mixtape/album Rumble in Fiskayyet and the resulting single "Magdansös". They followed up with a series of albums, Fullblod, 7 dar, Mosh Normal, Hayat and Sista Minuten. Their single "Miss Decibel" from the album Sista Minuten reached number 2 on Sverigetopplistan, the official Swedish Singles Chart. They have also released series of 4 mixtapes under the title Varsågod de e gratis and two volumes in the series Haffla Music.

Sami Rekik of the duo took part in Melodifestivalen 2021 in collaboration with WAHL with the song "90-talet". Medina reunited to enter Melodifestivalen 2022 with the song "In i dimman" and qualified for the final from Heat 4; at the final on 12 March 2022, they gained 109 points and finished in 3rd place. They participated in Melodifestivalen 2024 with "Que Sera", finishing second in their heat on 2 March 2024 and qualifying to the final where they came second. They participated in Melodifestivalen 2026 with the song "Viva L'Amor", and performed in the third heat on 14 February 2026, where they qualified directly to the final on 7 March 2026. They placed third in the final.

== Solo projects ==
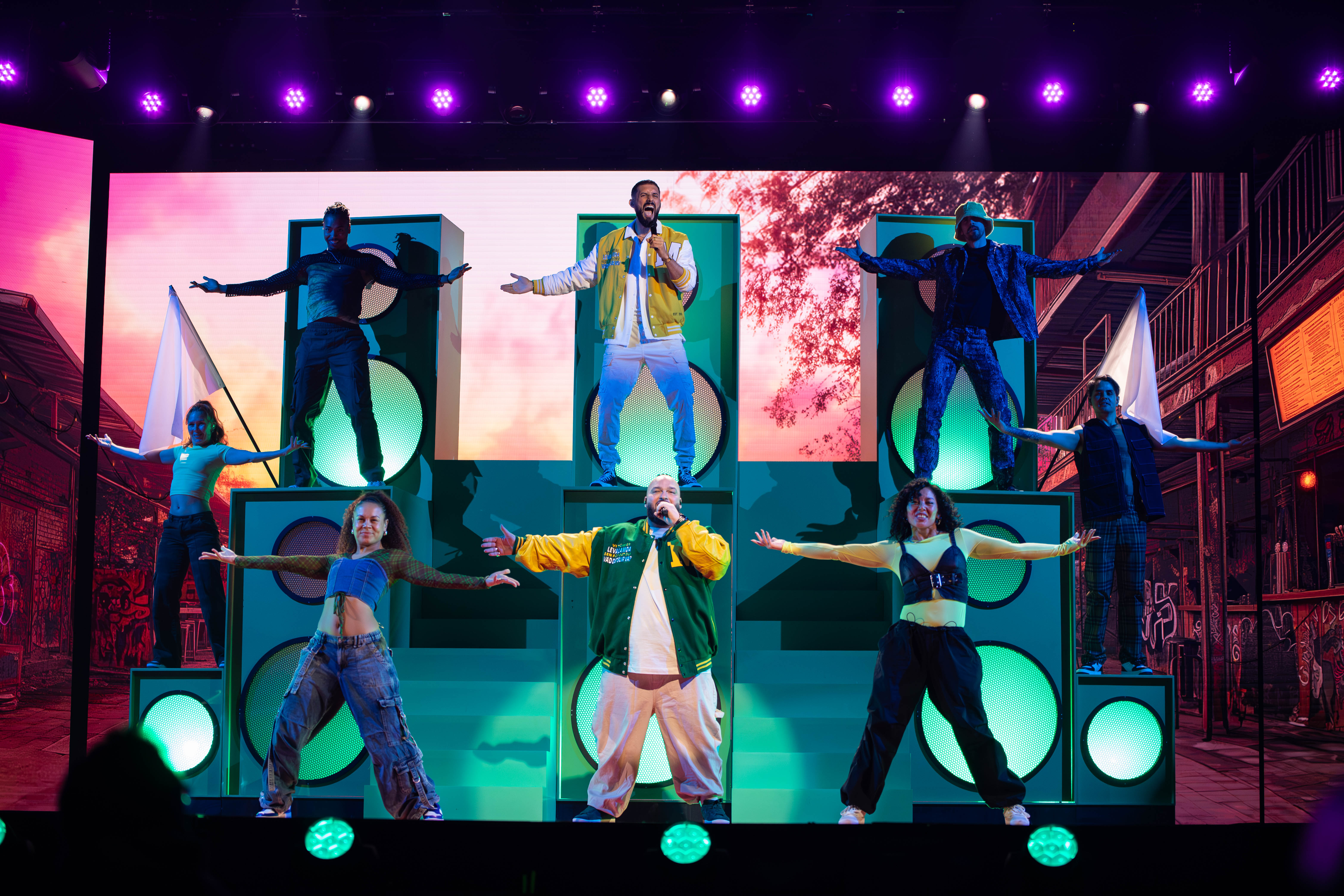
Medina performing at Melodifestivalen 2024.

=== Ali Jammali ===
Ali Jammali collaborated with G Mansour co-writing 10 of the rappers 16-track album The Cage. He also recorded and produced the track alongside Sami Rekik in the Medina Studios.

=== Sami Rekik ===
Sam-E has released his own solo releases including the album Om ni ba Wuisste and collaborated with other artists including with OIAM in "Avundsjuka", a charting hit on Sverigetopplistan. He has also collaborated with SödraSidan, Alpis, Petter, Anis Don Demina, Elias Abbas and many others.

In 2021, Sami Rekik under the mononym SAMI took part in Melodifestivalen 2021 with the song "90-talet" alongside member of duo SödraSidan Christopher Wahlberg under the stage name WAHL. The duo performed their song on 13 February 2021 during the second semi-final of the qualification round for Eurovision Song Contest for representing Sweden in Eurovision. WAHL featuring SAMI, the song came 6th of 7 acts during the night failing to qualify to the final or the Second Chance. However their song has charted in Sverigetopplistan, the official Swedish Singles Chart.

== Discography ==
=== Albums ===
Year	Album	Peak position
Year	Album	SWE
2005	Fullblod	–
2007	7 dar	–
2008	Mosh Normal (Tunisian album)	–
2012	Hayat	–
2013	Sista Minuten	15
2015	Haffla Avenyn	6
2023	Tropicalisera	–

=== Mixtapes ===
- 2004: Rumble in Fiskayyet
- 2004: Varsågod de e gratis Vol 1 (free album online in 2005)
- 2009: Varsågod de e gratis Vol. 2
- 2010: Haffla Music Vol. 1
- 2010: Varsågod de e gratis Vol. 3
- 2011: Varsågod de e gratis Vol. 4
- 2011: Haffla Music Vol. 2
- 2012: Svarta tårar

=== Singles ===
Year	Single	Peak position	Certification	Album
Year	Single	SWE	Certification	Album
2004	"Magdansös" (aka "Medina Anthem (Magdansös)")	48		Rumble in Fiskayyet
2005	"Fortsätt gå" (aka "Zid Emchi (Fortsätt gå)")	58		Fullblod
2012	"Där palmerna bor"	13	5× Platinum	Hayat
2013	"Miss Decibel"	2	Gold	Sista Minuten
2014	"Se på mig nu"	10		
2014	"Doga Doga" (feat. Arash)	–		
2015	"Tills vi koolar"	24		Haffla Avenyn
2022	"In i dimman"	2		
2022	"Nema problema"	— (Note: "Nema problema" did not enter the Swedish Singellista Chart, but peaked at number one on the Swedish Heatseeker Chart.)		
2022	"Säg nåt"	89		
2023	"Torka dina tårar"	— (Note: "Torka dina tårar" did not enter the Swedish Singellista Chart, but peaked at number 18 on the Swedish Heatseeker Chart.)		
2023	"När krutet har lagt sig"	— (Note: "När krutet har lagt sig" did not enter the Swedish Singellista Chart, but peaked at number 18 on the Swedish Heatseeker Chart.)		
2024	"Que Sera"	1		
2024	"Om igen"	— (Note: "Om igen" did not enter the Swedish Singellista Chart, but peaked at number two on the Swedish Heatseeker Chart.)		
2025	"Genom eld & vatten"	46		
2026	"Viva L'Amor"	2		

== Discography: Ali Jammali ==
=== Albums ===
as songwriter

- 2010: The Cage (by G Mansour)
  - Ali Jammali co-wrote 10 tracks from the 16-track album
  - All tracks recorded and mixed by Ali Jammali & Sami Rekik at Medina Studios

=== Mixtapes ===
Solo as Alibrorsh

- 2010: Parabol Paradis

== Discography: Sami Rekik ==
(using various names, mainly Sam-E, but also the mononym Sami (SAMI))

=== Albums ===
- Om ni ba Wuisste

=== Singles ===
Year	Single	Peak position	Album
Year	Single	SWE	Album
2002	"Riktiga proffs" (Fjärde Världen feat. Sam-E & Jesper)	–	
2014	"Avundsjuka" (OIAM feat. Sam-E)	26	
2014	"Stoppa mig" (Alpis feat. Sam-E)	–	
2015	"Kul på vägen" (Petter feat. Sam-E & Sara Zacharias)	67	Mitt folk
2015	"Till slut" (SödraSidan feat. Sam-E)	–	
2017	"Utanför" (Anis Don Demina featuring Sami and Elias Abbas)	42	Anis
2021	"90-talet" (WAHL feat. SAMI)	13	Melodifestivalen 2021
2021	"Flaggan i topp" (with Anis Don Demina)	4	Underbarn
