= Julia Alfrida =

Swedish singer

- Born: Julia Alfrida Ridderdal; 25 June 1995 (age 31); Åkersberga, Sweden
- Genres: Pop; dark-pop; hip hop
- Occupations: Singer; songwriter
- Years active: 2018–present
- Label: Independent

Julia Alfrida Ridderdal (born 25 June 1995) is a Swedish singer and songwriter.

== Career ==
In 2018, Alfrida released her debut single titled "Sweet Escape". In 2019, Alfrida released a single, "HER", leading her to perform at the Stockholm Pride and Copenhagen Pride.

In 2020, Alfrida participated in the competition P4 Nästa with the song "Dark Doom", placing sixth. Despite not winning, Alfrida was given a wildcard to participate in the music competition Melodifestivalen 2021. She participated with the song "Rich", co-written by her, along with Jimmy Jansson and Melanie Wehbe. However, the song failed to qualify from the semi-finals.

== Influences ==
Alfrida's influences include Lady Gaga, Tove Lo, Billie Eilish and Charli XCX.

== Personal life ==
Alfrida identifies herself as queer, non-binary, and a lesbian, stating that Eurovision Song Contest and Melodifestivalen are as a "part of coming out journey".

== Discography ==
=== Extended plays ===
Title	Details
EPISODE23	Released: 7 February 2020; Label: Independent; Format: Digital download, streaming

=== Singles ===
Title	Year	Peak chart positions	Album
Title	Year	SWE Heat.	Album
"Sweet Escape"	2018	—	Non-album singles
"Her"	2019	—	Non-album singles
"Sober"	2019	—	Episode23
"Dark Doom"	2020	26	Episode23
"Oh God"	2020	—	Episode23
"Rich"	2021	1	Non-album single

== See also ==
- Jimmy Jansson
