= Little Tot =

Single by Dotter
- Released: 27 February 2021
- Genre: Electropop; synth-pop
- Length: 2:52
- Label: Warner Music Sweden
- Songwriters: Dino Medanhodžić; Johanna Jansson

Dotter singles chronology
"New Year" (2020)	"Little Tot" (2021)	"Jealous" (2021)

"Little Tot" is a song by Swedish singer Dotter. It was performed in Melodifestivalen 2021 and made it to the 13 March final. She finished in fourth place in the final, with 105 points.

== Charts ==
Chart performance for "Little Tot"
Chart (2021)	Peak position
Sweden (Sverigetopplistan)	6
