= Bailá Bailá =

Single by Alvaro Estrella
- Released: 19 February 2021
- Length: 2:53
- Label: Universal
- Songwriters: Anderz Wrethov; Jimmy "Joker" Thörnfeldt; Linnea Deb
- Producers: Wrethov; Thörnfeldt

Alvaro Estrella singles chronology
"Mistletoe" (2020)	"Bailá Bailá" (2021)

"Bailá Bailá" is a song by Swedish singer Alvaro Estrella. It was performed in Melodifestivalen 2021 and made it to the 13 March final finishing 10th overall in 12 finalist entries.

== Charts ==
Chart performance for "Bailá Bailá"
Chart (2021)	Peak position
Sweden (Sverigetopplistan)	8
