= Emil Assergård =

Swedish singer-songwriter

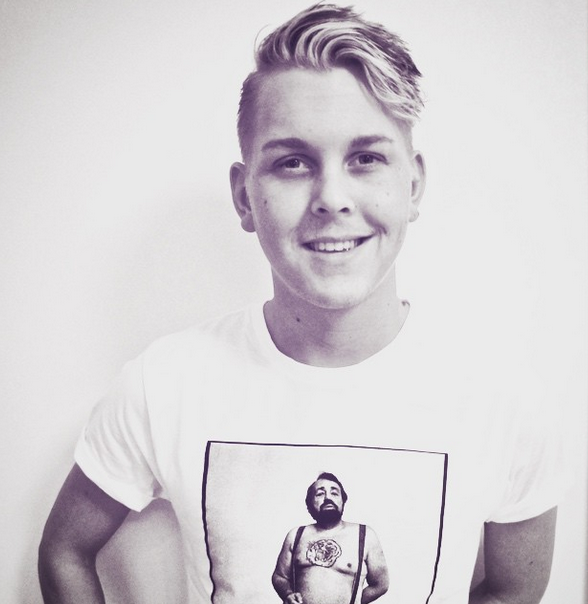
- Assergård in 2015.

Background information
- Born: Mats Emil Assergård; 23 May 1991 (age 35); Undrom, Sollefteå, Sweden
- Origin: Undrom, Sweden
- Occupations: Singer-songwriter; Musician
- Instrument: Vocals
- Label: Universal Music
- Website: emilassergard.com

Mats Emil Assergård (born 23 May 1991 in Undrom, Sweden) is a Swedish singer-songwriter and musician. He has been signed to Universal Music since 2016. Assergård currently resides in Stockholm.

== Career ==
Assergård has released three studio albums, with the first being Rakt från hjärtat, which was released in 2013. His second album was released in 2015, called Den Ensamma Känslan. His most recent album was released in 2019, which is called Leva Livet / En samling and it debuted and peaked at number five on the Swedish Album Chart and was subsequently certified Platinum in Sweden. The record marked his first album release while being signed to Universal Music. He has since 2013 released a handful of singles, including "All In" and "Ego", which have accumulated combined streams of over 45 million on Spotify. His song "Jag råkade sälja min bästa vän" was certified Gold in Sweden in late 2015. Some of Assergård's most recent singles were released on 10 April 2020, called "Om Jag Vore DJ" and "Om Jag Vore DJ V2." Assergård has also released three EPs during his career: Naket, which was released in 2013, Skön that was released in 2015 and Snö which also was released that year. Assergård was nominated for the "Male live performer of the year" Rockbjörnen award in 2019, but Benjamin Ingrosso later received the award. On 28 August 2020, Assergård released the single "Livet Suger".

He participated in Melodifestivalen 2021, but was eliminated in the semi-final.

== Discography ==
Adapted from Spotify.

=== Albums ===
Title	Year	Peak chart positions
Title	Year	SWE
Rakt från hjärtat	2013	—
Den ensamma känslan	2015	—
Leva livet / En samling	2019	5 (Note: The album also placed at number 54 on the Swedish Year-end album chart in 2019.)

=== Extended plays ===
Title	Year
Naket	2013
Skön	2015
Snö	2015

=== Singles ===
Title	Year	Peak chart positions	Certification	Album
Title	Year	SWE	Certification	Album
"Nyår"	2013	—	—	Non-album singles
"Milfen"	2014	—	—	Non-album singles
"Skit i vad dom säger"	2014	—	—	Non-album singles
"Länge kvar"	2015	—	—	Non-album singles
"All In"	2016	53	GLF: Platinum	Länge livet/En samling
"Klä av mig"	2018	82	—	Länge livet/En samling
"Solglasögon i december"	2018	89	—	Non-album singles
"Lova mig"	2018	—	—	Non-album singles
"Sönder"	2019	—	—	Non-album singles
"Dom vi inte tycker om"	2020	—	—	Non-album singles
"Om jag vore DJ"	2020	—	—	Non-album singles
"Om jag vore DJ V2"	2020	—	—	Non-album singles
"Livet suger"	2020	—	—	Non-album singles
"Om allting skiter sig"	2021	7	—	Non-album singles
"Dör för dig"	2021	— (Note: "Dör för dig" did not enter the Swedish Singellista Chart, but peaked at number six on the Swedish Heatseeker Chart.)	—	Non-album singles
"Vad gör du nu" (with Rasmus Gozzi and Froken Snusk)	2024	91	—	Non-album singles
"Tappat allt"	2026	— (Note: "Tappat allt" did not enter the Swedish Singellista Chart, but peaked at number six on the Swedish Heatseeker Chart.)	—	Non-album singles
"Ego"	2026	84	—	Non-album singles
