= Behöver inte dig idag =

Single by Clara Klingenström

from the album Claras dagbok
- Released: 27 February 2021
- Length: 3:00
- Label: Freebird; Warner
- Songwriters: Clara Klingenström; Bobby Ljunggren; David Lindgren Zacharias
- Producers: Ljunggren; Lindgren Zacharias

Clara Klingenström singles chronology
| "Så slut" (2020) | "Behöver inte dig idag" (2021) | "Liv" (2021) |

"Behöver inte dig idag" ("[I] do not need you today") is a song by Swedish singer Clara Klingenström. It was performed in Melodifestivalen 2021 and made it to the 13 March final.

== Charts ==
Chart performance for "Behöver inte dig idag"
| Chart (2021) | Peak position |
|---|---|
| Sweden (Sverigetopplistan) | 3 |
