= Move (The Mamas song) =

2020 single by The Mamas

Single by the Mamas
- Released: 22 February 2020
- Length: 2:48
- Label: Universal
- Songwriters: Melanie Wehbe; Patrik Jean; Herman Gardarfve

The Mamas singles chronology
"When You Wish Upon a Star" (2019)	"Move" (2020)	"Let It Be" (2020)

Eurovision Song Contest 2020 entry
- Country: Sweden
- Artist: The Mamas
- Languages: English
- Composers: Melanie Wehbe; Patrik Jean; Herman Gardarfve
- Lyricists: Melanie Wehbe; Patrik Jean; Herman Gardarfve

Finals performance
- Semi-final result: Contest cancelled

Entry chronology
- ◄ "Too Late for Love" (2019)
- "Voices" (2021) ►

"Move" is a gospel-pop song by Swedish music group the Mamas. The song was performed for the first time in Melodifestivalen 2020, where it made it to the final. The song won Melodifestivalen with 137 points and was to represent Sweden in the first semifinal of the Eurovision Song Contest 2020 in Rotterdam, before the contest was cancelled in March 2020 due to the COVID-19 pandemic. It peaked at number one on the Swedish singles chart.

== Eurovision Song Contest ==
=== Melodifestivalen ===
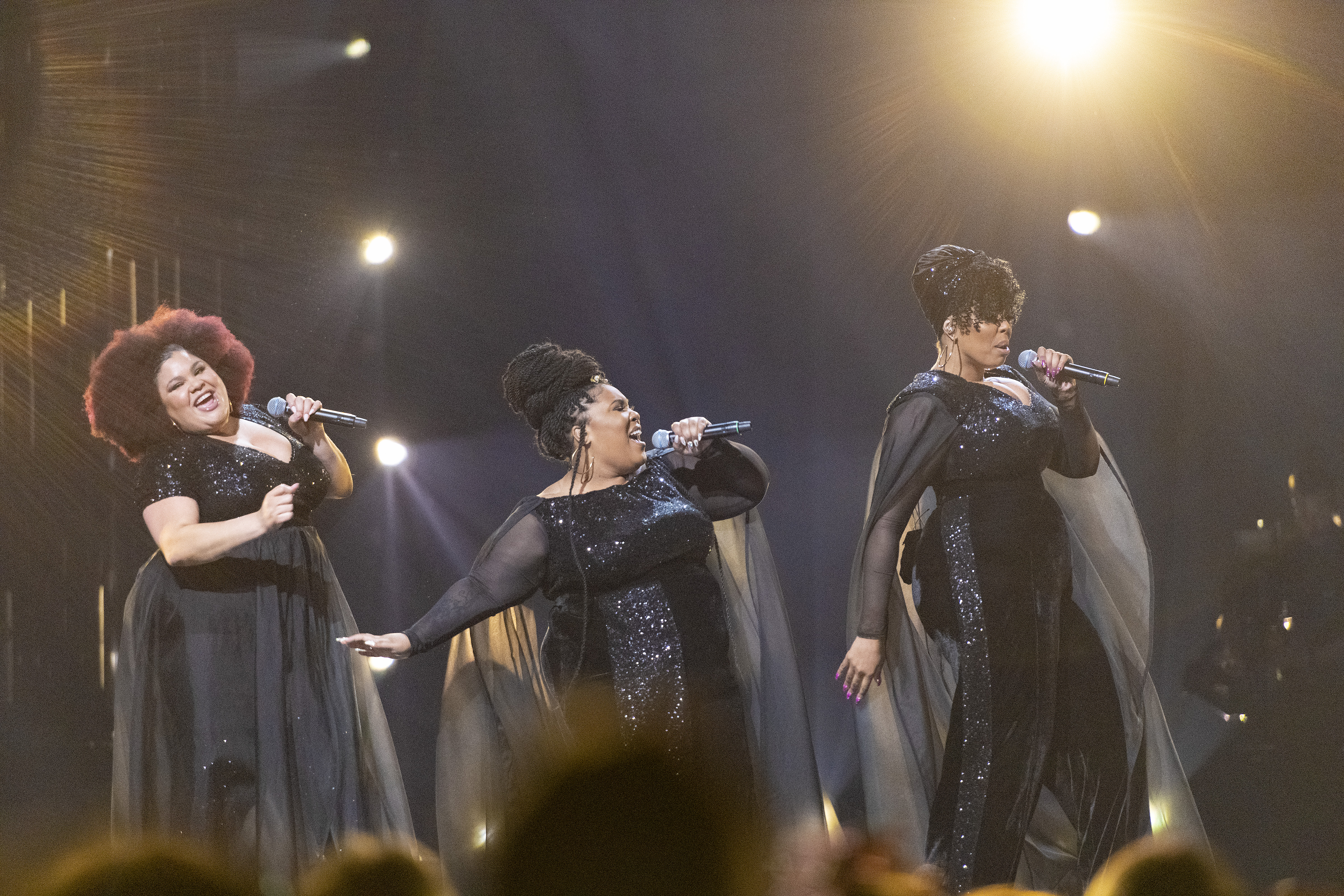
The Mamas performing "Move" at Melodifestivalen 2020 in Linköping, Sweden.

The winner of Melodifestivalen represents Sweden at the Eurovision Song Contest. Melodifestivalen 2020 was held over six weeks from early February through early March 2020, with a show each Saturday evening. "Move" appeared in the first semi-final of the competition on 1 February and qualified for the 7 March final. After a close round of final voting, the Mamas edged out Dotter and her song "Bulletproof" by one point to win the competition and the opportunity to represent Sweden.

=== In Rotterdam ===
The Eurovision Song Contest 2020 was originally scheduled to take place at Rotterdam Ahoy in Rotterdam, Netherlands and consist of two semi-finals on 12 and 14 May, and a final on 16 May 2020. According to Eurovision rules, each country, except the host nation and the "Big Five" (France, Germany, Italy, Spain and the United Kingdom), would have been required to qualify from one of two semi-finals to compete for the final; the top ten countries from each semi-final would have progressed to the final. On 28 January 2020, the allocation draw was held, placing "Move" into the first half of the first semi-final. However, due to the 2020 coronavirus pandemic in Europe, the contest was cancelled on 18 March 2020. The EBU announced soon after that entries intended for 2020 would not be eligible for the following year, though each broadcaster would be able to send either their 2020 representative or a new one.

==== Alternative song contests ====
Some of the broadcasters scheduled to take part in the Eurovision Song Contest 2020 have organised alternative competitions. Austria's ORF aired Der kleine Song Contest in April 2020, which saw every entry being assigned to one of three semi-finals. A jury consisting of ten singers that had represented Austria at Eurovision before was hired to rank each song; the best-placed in each semi-final advanced to the final round. In the second semi-final on 16 April, "Move" placed second in a field of 14 participants, achieving 86 points. The song participated in Sveriges Television's Sveriges 12:a in May 2020.

== Track listing ==
- Digital download (Note: This acts as a summary of all versions of the single released for digital download.)
1. "Move" – 2:48
2. "Move" (Instrumental) – 2:48

== Charts ==
=== Weekly charts ===
Chart (2020)	Peak position
Scottish Singles Sales (Official Charts)	52
Sweden (Sverigetopplistan)	1
UK Singles Downloads (Official Charts)	55

=== Year-end charts ===
Chart (2020)	Position
Sweden (Sverigetopplistan)	74

== Certifications ==
Region	Certification	Certified units/sales
Sweden (GLF)	Platinum	8,000,000^{†}
^{†} Streaming-only figures based on certification alone.

== Release history ==
Country	Date	Format(s)	Label	Ref.
Various	22 February 2020	Digital download; streaming	Universal	
