= Christopher Wahlberg =

Swedish singer-songwriter

Christopher Wahlberg (WAHL)
- Born: Christopher Wahlberg; 10 December 1985 (age 40); Stockholm, Sweden
- Genres: Hip hop
- Occupations: Singer; songwriter

Christopher Wahlberg (born 10 December 1985) is a Swedish singer and songwriter.

== In SödraSidan ==
SödraSidan (formerly Dalenbarn)
- Origin: Enskededalen, Stockholm, Sweden
- Genres: Rap, hip hop, pop
- Years active: 2010-present Dalenbarn (2009); SödraSidan (2010-present)
- Label: Playground Music Scandinavia
- Members: Daniel "Jutte" Jutterström; Christopher "Chrippa" Wahlberg

He is known as a member of the hip hop duo SödraSidan. The band was established as Dalenbarn in 2009 as a duo of two childhood friends Daniel Jutterström (Jutte) and Christopher Wahlberg (Chrippa) both originating from Enskededalenas in southern Stockholm who had been rapping together since the age of 15. Their EP Stället där vi bor was described as "förortsrap" (meaning suburban rap). In 2010, they changed the name to SödraSidan based on their single of the same name released on December 22, 2010 together with a music video in collaboration with producer Proclaimer.

== Melodifestivalen ==
Wahlberg participated in Melodifestivalen 2021 under the stage name WAHL along with SAMI (actually Sami Rekik of the Swedish duo Medina) with the song "90-talet". Performing during the second semi-final held on 13 February 2021, they came in 6th of 7 acts and failing to qualify to the final or the Second Chance. However their song has charted in Sverigetopplistan, the official Swedish Singles Chart.

== Discography ==
=== Albums ===
as part of SödraSida

- 2014: För evigt unga

=== EPs ===
as Dalenbarn

- 2009: Stället där vi bor

=== Singles ===
as part of Dalenbarn

- 2009: "Betongen"
- 2009: "Pass på dom" (feat. P)
- 2009: "Stället där vi bor"
- 2009: "Om idag"
- 2009: "Jagar det"
- 2010: "Spår från uppväxten" (with Victoria Limenza & Don Paco)
- 2010: "Svarta nätter" (with Danjah)

as part of SödraSida

- 2010: "SödraSidan" (feat. Danjah)
  - 2011: "SödraSidan (Remix)" (feat. Sebbe Kartellen, Alpis, Mohammed Ali, Näääk & Fille)
- 2011: "Min hemstad (with Alpis)
- 2012: "Alla"
- 2012: "Fånga dagen"
- 2013: "Vårt sätt"
- 2013: "Äntligen solsken" (feat. Kaliffa)
- 2013: "Vi flyger" (feat. Örnsberg)
- 2014: "Står tillsammans"
- 2014: "Våran kväll" (feat. Olle Grafström)
- 2015: "Helt ärligt" (feat. Alpis)
- 2015: "Till slut" (feat. Sam-E)
- 2016: "Landat"
- 2016: "Vi fakkar upp vår värld"
- 2017: "Allt e precis som det ska va"
- 2017: "Staden i natten" (feat. Simon Erics och Simmewox)
- 2017: "Blinka lilla stjärna"
- 2018: "Rakt ut (feat. Nimo & Alpis)
- 2018: "Blåljus och page"

as WAHL

Title	Year	Peak chart positions	Album
Title	Year	SWE	Album
"90-talet" (credited as WAHL feat. SAMI)	2021	13	Melodifestivalen 2021
