= In the Middle (The Mamas song) =

Single by the Mamas
- Released: 27 February 2021
- Length: 3:03
- Label: Universal
- Songwriters: Emily Falvey; Robin Stjernberg; Jimmy Jansson

The Mamas singles chronology
"A Christmas Night to Remember" (2020)	"In the Middle" (2021)	"Itsy Bitsy Teenie Weenie Yellow Polka Dot Bikini" (2021)

"In the Middle" is a song by the Mamas. It was performed in Melodifestivalen 2021 and made it to the 13 March final.

== Charts ==
Chart performance for "In the Middle"
Chart (2021)	Peak position
Sweden (Sverigetopplistan)	9
