= Beat of Broken Hearts =

Single by Klara Hammarström
- Released: 20 February 2021
- Length: 3:02
- Label: Giant; Warner
- Songwriters: Andreas Wijk; David Kreuger; Fredrik Kempe; Niklas Carson
- Producers: Kreuger; Kempe; Carson

Klara Hammarström singles chronology
"DNA" (2020)	"Beat of Broken Hearts" (2021)

"Beat of Broken Hearts" is a song by Swedish singer Klara Hammarström. It was performed in Melodifestivalen 2021 and made it to the 13 March final.

== Charts ==
Chart performance for "Beat of Broken Hearts"
Chart (2021)	Peak position
Sweden (Sverigetopplistan)	10
