= Frida Green =

Swedish singer (born 1992)

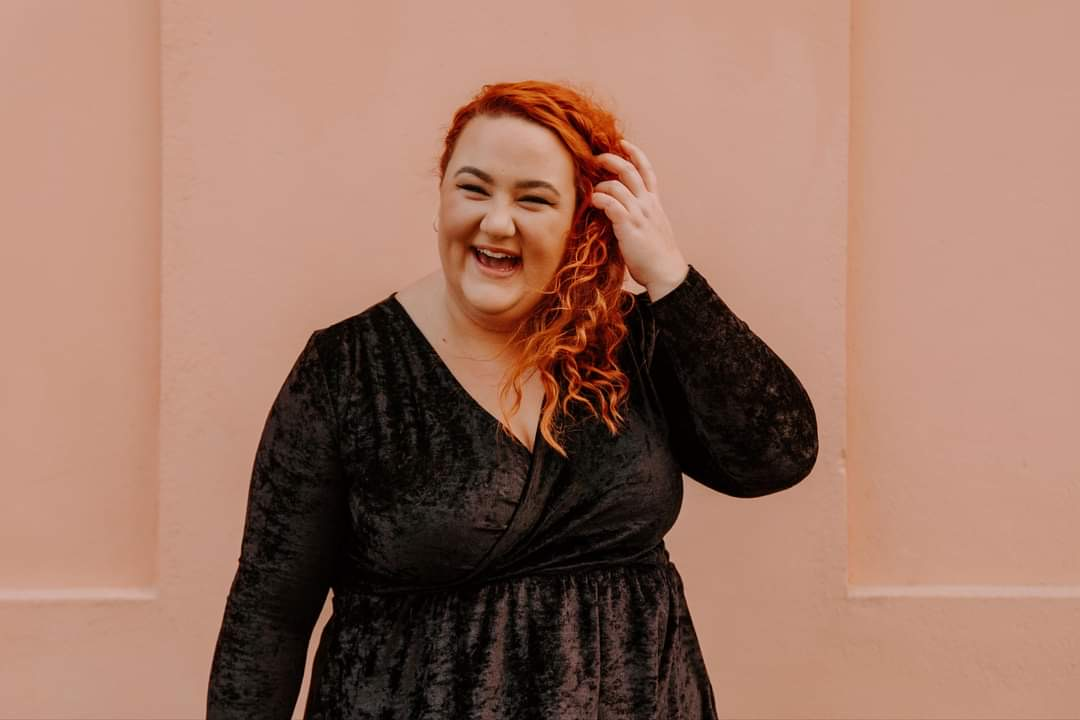

Background information
- Born: Frida Elin Green; 6 September 1992 (age 33); Ystad, Sweden
- Genres: Pop
- Occupation: Singer
- Instrument: Guitar
- Years active: 2018–present
- Labels: Cardiac; Sony Music Sweden

Frida Elin Green (born 6 September 1992) is a Swedish singer. She reached the final of the Swedish version of Got Talent, Talang 2018.

== Career ==
In 2015, Green contributed her vocals in Swedish group Badpojken's single "Johnny G (The Guidetti Song)", which reached number one on the Sverigetopplistan. In 2017, Green performed "O helga natt" during the SVT coverage of Saint Lucy's Day, Luciamorgon. Green appeared in the talent show Talang in 2018. In 2019, Green released her debut single, "Beat 'Em Up". Green released a single as a tribute to environmental activist Greta Thunberg titled "What Would Greta Do?". Green participated in Melodifestivalen 2021 with the song "The Silence", written by Anna Bergendahl, Bobby Ljunggren, David Lindgren Zacharias and Joy Deb. The song qualified for the Andra Chansen round, however lost to Paul Rey's song and was thus eliminated.

== Discography ==
=== Singles ===
Title	Year	Peak chart positions	Album
Title	Year	SWE	Album
"What About Us"	2018	—	Non-album singles
"Beat 'Em Up"	2019	—	Non-album singles
"What Would Greta Do?"	2019	—	Non-album singles
"The Silence"	2021	60	Melodifestivalen 2021
"Chasing My Song"	2021	—	TBA
