= Lovad =

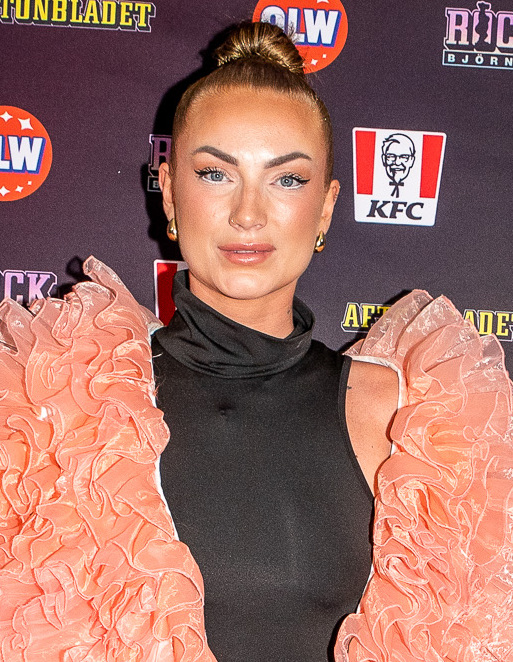
- Lovad in 2024

Background information
- Also known as: Lova
- Born: Lova Inger Irene Drevstam; 4 November 1992 (age 33); Tyresö, Sweden
- Genres: Pop
- Occupations: Singer; songwriter
- Years active: 2018–present
- Labels: TGR Music; Sony Music Entertainment Sweden; Independent

Lova Inger Irene Drevstam (born 4 November 1992), known as Lovad, is a Swedish singer and songwriter.

== Career ==
Under the stage name, Lova, she released her debut single "Min syster sa" in 2018. In 2019, Lovad was named as one of the Stockholms Topp 5 by Sveriges Radio. She was also awarded a music and songwriting scholarship in STIM.

In 2020, she released a single with Albin Johnsén titled "Vi gjorde vårt bästa". On 1 December 2020, Lovad announced that she would participate in Melodifestivalen 2021 with the song "Allting är precis likadant", co-written by her, along with Johnsén, Mattias Andréasson and Alexander Nivek. Her song, "Allting är precis likadant", failed to qualify from the semi-finals and was eliminated.

== Discography ==
=== Singles ===
Title	Year	Peak chart positions	Album
Title	Year	SWE	Album
"Min syster sa"	2018	—	Non-album singles
"Tills vi dör"	2019	—	Non-album singles
"Innan dig"	2019	—	Non-album singles
"Jag lovar"	2019	—	Non-album singles
"Läka så vackert"	2020	—	Non-album singles
"Låt mig gå"	2020	—	Non-album singles
"Vi gjorde vårt bästa" (with Albin Johnsén)	2020	27	Non-album singles
"Allting är precis likadant"	2021	30	Non-album singles
"Vågar"	2022	88	Non-album singles
"Tänd dina ljus"	2022	84	Non-album singles
"Stockholm"	2023	— (Note: "Stockholm" did not enter the Swedish Singellista Chart, but peaked at number 10 on the Swedish Heatseeker Chart.)	Non-album singles
"December"	2023	— (Note: "December" did not enter the Swedish Singellista Chart, but peaked at number 20 on the Swedish Heatseeker Chart.)	Non-album singles
"Kommer du lämna innan jul"	2025	82	Non-album singles
