= Sannex =

Swedish dance band

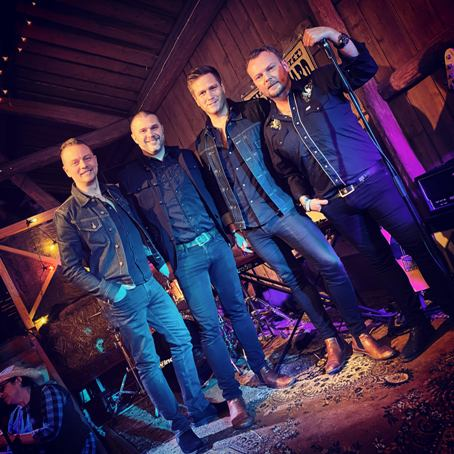
- Sannex, 2015

Background information
- Origin: Sweden
- Genre: Dansband music
- Years active: Late 1970s - present
- Members: Andreas Olsson; Patrich Rundström; Christian "Mini" Olsson; Micke Norsten
- Past members: See section in text

Sannex is a dansband from Sweden. The band was formed as a school project in 1977. In the mid-1980s, it was a six-man band, which invested in a professional career. In 1987, Sannex became the backing band for Ann-Louise Hanson, and in November 1987 became a full-time dance band, after working with Ann-Louise for five weeks at Restaurant Cabaret in Stockholm. They participated in Dansbandskampen in 2009.

In 2013, the singer Andreas Olsson took over the band and they have since won, among other things, four Guldklavar in three years, also winning a Grammis. They have appeared in several TV programs, for example Allsång på Skansen in 2017 and 2018. They were in Melodifestivalen 2021 with "All Inclusive", but did not qualify to the finals.

== Members ==
- Andreas Olsson – vocals and guitar
- Patrich Rundström – piano and vocals
- Christian "Mini" Olsson – bas and vocals
- Micke Norsten – drums and vocals

=== Former members ===
- Roger Bergstrand – vocals, keyboard
- Jonas Wennman – guitar, vocals, sax
- Ronny Öberg – keyboard
- Per-Håkan Helen – guitar, vocals
- Lars Johansson – keyboard, vocals, sax
- Jörgen Hållen – bas, vocals
- Rickard Cox – drums
- Björn Norbäck – drums
- Tony Westland – vocals, keyboard, saxophone
- Magnus Meinert – vocals and keyboard
- Mattias Eklund – saxophone and keyboard
- Johan Olsson – drums
- Chris Andersen – vocals and guitar
- Hans Plahn – drums
- Jenny Sahlén
- Andreas "Lill-Klas" Andersson – bas, sax and vocals
- Stefan Karlsson – piano, acoustic guitar and vocals

== Discography ==
=== Albums ===
- 1990: Om du säger som det är
- 1993: Vem slår ditt hjärta för
- 1994: Kvällen är över
- 1994: Kärlekens klockor
- 1997: Mr Dee Jay
- 2001: Din i natt
- 2003: Angelina
- 2006: Live 2005
- 2006: Vem får följa med dig hem
- 2008: Live
- 2009: Live på sta'n
- 2011: Får jag lov
- 2012: Tillbaka till framtiden (peaked in Sweden at #5)
- 2014: Jag vill leva (peaked in Sweden at #4)
- 2015: Vill ni ha en till (live album)
- 2016: Din sida sängen (peaked in Sweden at #15)

=== Singles ===
- 1990: "I kärlekens namn"
- 1992: "Precis som Ferdinand"
- 1992: "Kvällen är över"
- 1993: "Tre tända ljus"
- 1994: "Kärlekens spel"
- 1994: "Ge mig ljus"
- 1995: "Glöm inte bort varan"
- 1995: "Ge mig all din kärlek"
- 1997: "Höstens sista ros"
- 1997: "Vem får dina kyssar i kväll"
- 1999: "I kväll ska allting hända"
- 2000: "När sommaren vänder åter"
- 2000: "Ingen kan bli, som du"
- 2001: "Om du visste vad jag saknar dig"
- 2001: "Om jag bara vågar"
- 2001: "Ta emot min hand"
- 2002: "Angelina"
- 2003: "Cyberfriend"
- 2003: "Vi tänder ett ljus"
- 2004: "Stanna hos mig"
- 2006: "Jag är rädd för dig"
- 2006: "Vem får följa med dig hem"
- 2006: 'Julefrid"
- 2007: "När han kommer hem"
- 2008: "Försent för ett glas"
- 2008: "Här tillsammans"
- 2009: "Allt jag vill ha"

Title	Year	Peak chart positions	Album
Title	Year	SWE	Album
"All Inclusive"	2021	55	Non-album single

=== Charting songs in Svensktoppen ===
Year	Title	Peak
1993	"Kvällen är över"	5
1993	"Vem slår ditt hjärta för"	6
1994	"Tre tända ljus"	6
1996	"Ge mig all din kärlek"	7
1997	"Vem får dina kyssar i kväll?"	4

Others

- 1990: "I kärlekens namn"
- 2000: "Ingen kan bli som du"
- 2004: "Stanna hos mig"
