= Melodifestivalen 2021 =

Swedish music competition

Dates and venue
- Heat 1: 6 February 2021
- Heat 2: 13 February 2021
- Heat 3: 20 February 2021
- Heat 4: 27 February 2021
- Second chance: 6 March 2021
- Final: 13 March 2021
- Venue: Annexet, Stockholm

Production
- Broadcaster: Sveriges Television (SVT)
- Director: Robin Hofwander; Fredrik Bäcklund
- Presenters: All shows: Christer Björkman; Guest co-hosts: Lena Philipsson (heat 1); Oscar Zia and Anis Don Demina (heat 2); Jason Diakité (heat 3); Per Andersson and Pernilla Wahlgren (heat 4); Shirley Clamp (Second Chance); Måns Zelmerlöw and Shima Niavarani (final)

Participants
- Number of entries: 28
- Number of finalists: 12

Vote
- Voting system: Heats: 100% public vote Final: 50% public vote, 50% jury vote
- Winning song: "Voices" by Tusse

Melodifestivalen 2021 was the 61st edition of the Swedish music competition Melodifestivalen. The competition was organised by Sveriges Television (SVT) and took place over a six-week period between 6 February and 13 March 2021. Due to the COVID-19 pandemic, all shows of this edition took place in the Annexet in Stockholm, and without an audience. The winner of the competition was Tusse with the song "Voices", who represented Sweden in the Eurovision Song Contest 2021 in Rotterdam, Netherlands, where he came fourteenth with 109 points.

The format of the competition consisted of 6 shows: 4 heat rounds, a second chance round and a final. An initial 28 entries were selected for the competition through three methods: an open call for song submissions, direct invitations to specific artists and songwriters, and a wildcard given to one of the artists that participated in the P4 Nästa competition organised by Sveriges Radio P4. The 28 competing entries were divided into four heats, with seven compositions in each. From each heat, the songs that earned first and second place qualified directly to the final, while the songs that placed third and fourth proceeded to the Second Chance round. The bottom three songs in each heat were eliminated from the competition. An additional four entries qualified from the Second Chance round to the final, bringing the total number of competing entries in the final to 12.

All six shows were hosted by Christer Björkman, who was joined by guest co-hosts during each show: Lena Philipsson (heat 1), Oscar Zia and Anis Don Demina (heat 2), Jason Diakité (heat 3), Per Andersson and Pernilla Wahlgren (heat 4), Shirley Clamp (Second Chance round), and Shima Niavarani and Måns Zelmerlöw (final).

== Format ==
Due to pandemic precautions, SVT did not hold the usual Melodifestivalen tour around six different Swedish cities during the 2021 edition. Instead, all shows were held at Stockholm's Annexet hall, one of the venues in Stockholm Globe City. The shows did not have a live audience.

Competition Schedule
Show	Date	City	Venue
Heat 1	6 February 2021	Stockholm	Annexet
Heat 2	13 February 2021	Stockholm	Annexet
Heat 3	20 February 2021	Stockholm	Annexet
Heat 4	27 February 2021	Stockholm	Annexet
Second Chance	6 March 2021	Stockholm	Annexet
Final	13 March 2021	Stockholm	Annexet

=== Presenters ===
On 4 January 2021, the presenters of the 61st edition of Melodifestivalen were announced. Christer Björkman, outgoing contest producer of Melodifestivalen and head of the Swedish delegation at the Eurovision Song Contest, served as the main presenter for all six shows. Björkman was joined by different guest co-hosts during each show: Lena Philipsson (heat 1), Oscar Zia and Anis Don Demina (heat 2), Jason Diakité (heat 3), Per Andersson and Pernilla Wahlgren (heat 4), Shirley Clamp (Second Chance round), Shima Niavarani and Måns Zelmerlöw (final).

== Competing entries ==
Broadcaster SVT revealed on 27 November 2020 that they would be releasing the acts for Melodifestivalen 2021 on a countdown, starting on 1 December.

Artist	Song	Songwriter(s)
Alvaro Estrella	"Bailá Bailá"	Anderz Wrethov, Linnea Deb, Jimmy "Joker" Thörnfeldt
Anton Ewald	"New Religion"	Jonas Wallin, Joe Killington, Anton Ewald, Maja Strömstedt
Arvingarna	"Tänker inte alls gå hem"	Stefan Brunzell, Nanne Grönvall, Thomas G:son, Bobby Ljunggren
Charlotte Perrelli	"Still Young"	Thomas G:son, Bobby Ljunggren, Erik Bernholm, Charlie Gustavsson
Clara Klingenström	"Behöver inte dig idag"	Clara Klingenström, Bobby Ljunggren, David Lindgren Zacharias
Danny Saucedo	"Dandi dansa"	Danny Saucedo, Karl-Johan Råsmark
Dotter	"Little Tot"	Johanna Jansson, Dino Medanhodzic
Efraim Leo	"Best of Me"	Efraim Leo, Cornelia Jakobsdotter, Amanda Björkegren, Herman Gardarfve
Elisa	"Den du är"	Bobby Ljunggren, Ingela "Pling" Forsman, Elisa Lindström
Emil Assergård	"Om allting skiter sig"	Emil Assergård, Jimmy Jansson, Jimmy "Joker" Thörnfeldt, Anderz Wrethov, Johanna Wrethov
Eric Saade	"Every Minute"	Eric Saade, Linnea Deb, Joy Deb, Jimmy "Joker" Thörnfeldt
Eva Rydberg & Ewa Roos	"Rena rama ding dong"	Göran Sparrdahl, Kalle Rydberg, Ari Lehtonen
Frida Green	"The Silence"	Anna Bergendahl, Bobby Ljunggren, David Lindgren Zacharias, Joy Deb
Jessica Andersson	"Horizon"	David Kreuger, Fredrik Kempe, Jesper Jakobsson Grand, Markus Lidén, Christian Holmström
Julia Alfrida	"Rich"	Julia Alfrida, Jimmy Jansson, Melanie Wehbe
Kadiatou	"One Touch"	Joy Deb, Linnea Deb, Jimmy "Joker" Thörnfeldt, Anderz Wrethov
Klara Hammarström	"Beat of Broken Hearts"	David Kreuger, Fredrik Kempe, Niklas Carson Mattson, Andreas Wijk
Lillasyster	"Pretender"	Isak Hallén, Jakob Redtzer, Martin Westerstrand, Ian Paolo Lira, Palle Hammarlund
Lovad	"Allting är precis likadant"	Mattias Andréasson, Alexander Nivek, Lova Drevstam, Albin Johnsén
Mustasch	"Contagious"	Ralf Gyllenhammar, David Johannesson
Nathalie Brydolf	"Fingerprints"	Andreas "Stone" Johansson, Etta Zelmani, Laurell Barker, Anna-Klara Folin
Patrik Jean	"Tears Run Dry"	Herman Gardarfve, Patrik Jean, Melanie Wehbe
Paul Rey	"The Missing Piece"	Fredrik Sonefors, Laurell Barker, Pauli Jokela
Sannex	"All Inclusive"	Greta Svensson, Hans Thorstensson
Tess Merkel	"Good Life"	Tony Malm, Tess Merkel, Palle Hammarlund, Mats Tärnfors
The Mamas	"In the Middle"	Emily Falvey, Robin Stjernberg, Jimmy Jansson
Tusse	"Voices"	Joy Deb, Linnea Deb, Jimmy "Joker" Thörnfeldt, Anderz Wrethov
Wahl feat. Sami	"90-talet"	Sami Rekik, Christopher Wahlberg, Josefin Glenmark, Jesper Welander, Andreas Larsson

== Heats ==
=== Heat 1 ===
The first heat took place on 6 February 2021. 3,308,000 viewers watched the heat live. A total of 7,824,951 votes were cast, using 628,624 devices (which is a record for a heat).

R/O	Artist	Song	Votes		Place	Result
R/O	Artist	Song	Votes	Points	Place	Result
1	Kadiatou	"One Touch"	967,331	29	6	Out
2	Lillasyster	"Pretender"	1,159,154	48	4	Second Chance
3	Jessica Andersson	"Horizon"	1,065,794	38	5	Out
4	Paul Rey	"The Missing Piece"	1,239,146	68	3	Second Chance
5	Arvingarna	"Tänker inte alls gå hem"	1,190,449	72	2	Final
6	Nathalie Brydolf	"Fingerprints"	825,414	11	7	Out
7	Danny Saucedo	"Dandi dansa"	1,377,663	78	1	Final

Detailed televoting results
R/O	Song	Age groups							Tel.
R/O	Song	3‍–‍9	10‍–‍15	16‍–‍29	30‍–‍44	45‍–‍59	60‍–‍74	75+	Tel.
1	"One Touch"	10	8	4	2	1	1	2	1
2	"Pretender"	2	2	8	12	6	4	4	10
3	"Horizon"	4	4	2	4	4	8	8	4
4	"The Missing Piece"	12	12	10	8	8	6	6	6
5	"Tänker inte alls gå hem"	8	6	6	6	10	12	12	12
6	"Fingerprints"	1	1	1	1	2	2	1	2
7	"Dandi dansa"	6	10	12	10	12	10	10	8

=== Heat 2 ===
The second heat took place on 13 February 2021. 2,972,000 viewers watched the heat live. A total of 7,471,451 votes were cast, using 581,410 devices.

R/O	Artist	Song	Votes		Place	Result
R/O	Artist	Song	Votes	Points	Place	Result
1	Anton Ewald	"New Religion"	1,218,312	68	2	Final
2	Julia Alfrida	"Rich"	751,337	11	7	Out
3	Wahl feat. Sami	"90-talet"	961,160	30	6	Out
4	Frida Green	"The Silence"	1,028,299	47	4	Second Chance
5	Eva Rydberg & Ewa Roos	"Rena rama ding dong"	997,947	52	3	Second Chance
6	Patrik Jean	"Tears Run Dry"	1,049,434	44	5	Out
7	Dotter	"Little Tot"	1,464,962	92	1	Final

Detailed televoting results
R/O	Song	Age groups							Tel.
R/O	Song	3‍–‍9	10‍–‍15	16‍–‍29	30‍–‍44	45‍–‍59	60‍–‍74	75+	Tel.
1	"New Religion"	10	10	8	10	10	6	8	6
2	"Rich"	4	1	1	1	1	1	1	1
3	"90-talet"	8	2	2	8	4	2	2	2
4	"The Silence"	1	8	4	4	8	8	6	8
5	"Rena rama ding dong"	2	6	6	2	2	10	12	12
6	"Tears Run Dry"	6	4	10	6	6	4	4	4
7	"Little Tot"	12	12	12	12	12	12	10	10

=== Heat 3 ===
The third heat took place on 20 February 2021. 3,188,000 viewers watched the heat live. A total of 8,002,967 votes were cast, using 647,000 devices, again a record for a heat.

R/O	Artist	Song	Votes		Place	Result
R/O	Artist	Song	Votes	Points	Place	Result
1	Charlotte Perrelli	"Still Young"	1,272,523	62	2	Final
2	Emil Assergård	"Om allting skiter sig"	987,458	34	5	Out
3	Klara Hammarström	"Beat of Broken Hearts"	1,252,895	58	4	Second Chance
4	Mustasch	"Contagious"	763,045	18	6	Out
5	Elisa	"Den du är"	613,779	18	7	Out
6	Alvaro Estrella	"Bailá Bailá"	1,193,914	60	3	Second Chance
7	Tusse	"Voices"	1,919,353	94	1	Final

Detailed televoting results
R/O	Song	Age groups							Tel.
R/O	Song	3‍–‍9	10‍–‍15	16‍–‍29	30‍–‍44	45‍–‍59	60‍–‍74	75+	Tel.
1	"Still Young"	4	6	4	8	10	10	10	10
2	"Om allting skiter sig"	6	4	8	4	2	2	2	6
3	"Beat of Broken Hearts"	12	10	10	10	6	4	4	2
4	"Contagious"	2	2	2	2	4	1	1	4
5	"Den du är"	1	1	1	1	1	6	6	1
6	"Bailá Bailá"	8	8	6	6	8	8	8	8
7	"Voices"	10	12	12	12	12	12	12	12

=== Heat 4 ===
The fourth heat took place on 27 February 2021. 2,953,000 viewers watched the heat live. A total of 6,957,584 votes were cast, using 565,705 devices.

R/O	Artist	Song	Votes		Place	Result
R/O	Artist	Song	Votes	Points	Place	Result
1	Tess Merkel	"Good Life"	868,050	40	5	Out
2	Lovad	"Allting är precis likadant"	783,763	21	6	Out
3	Efraim Leo	"Best of Me"	1,035,821	52	3	Second Chance
4	The Mamas	"In the Middle"	1,550,459	94	1	Final
5	Sannex	"All Inclusive"	609,909	14	7	Out
6	Clara Klingenström	"Behöver inte dig idag"	930,002	51	4	Second Chance
7	Eric Saade	"Every Minute"	1,179,580	72	2	Final

Detailed televoting results
R/O	Song	Age groups							Tel.
R/O	Song	3‍–‍9	10‍–‍15	16‍–‍29	30‍–‍44	45‍–‍59	60‍–‍74	75+	Tel.
1	"Good Life"	6	4	4	4	6	6	4	6
2	"Allting är precis likadant"	2	6	6	2	2	1	1	1
3	"Best of Me"	10	8	8	8	4	4	6	4
4	"In the Middle"	12	12	12	12	12	12	12	10
5	"All Inclusive"	4	1	1	1	1	2	2	2
6	"Behöver inte dig idag"	1	2	2	6	8	10	10	12
7	"Every Minute"	8	10	10	10	10	8	8	8

== Second Chance ==
The Second Chance round took place on 6 March 2021. 2,732,000 viewers watched the show live. A total of 9,159,642 votes were cast, using 632,883 devices (which are both records for the Second Chance round).

Duel	R/O	Artist	Song	Votes	Points	Result
I	1	Alvaro Estrella	"Bailá Bailá"	1,365,376	7	Final
I	2	Lillasyster	"Pretender"	1,163,807	1	Out
II	3	Frida Green	"The Silence"	925,473	1	Out
II	4	Paul Rey	"The Missing Piece"	1,207,581	7	Final
III	5	Eva Rydberg & Ewa Roos	"Rena rama ding dong"	1,173,492	3	Out
III	6	Clara Klingenström	"Behöver inte dig idag"	1,276,040	5	Final
IV	7	Klara Hammarström	"Beat of Broken Hearts"	1,139,262	8	Final
IV	8	Efraim Leo	"Best of Me"	908,611	0	Out

Detailed televoting results
Duel	R/O	Song	Age groups							Tel.	Total
Duel	R/O	Song	3‍–‍9	10‍–‍15	16‍–‍29	30‍–‍44	45‍–‍59	60‍–‍74	75+	Tel.	Total
I	1	"Bailá Bailá"	1	1	1	1	1	1	1	0	7
I	2	"Pretender"	0	0	0	0	0	0	0	1	1
II	3	"The Silence"	0	0	0	0	0	0	0	1	1
II	4	"The Missing Piece"	1	1	1	1	1	1	1	0	7
III	5	"Rena rama ding dong"	1	1	1	0	0	0	0	0	3
III	6	"Behöver inte dig idag"	0	0	0	1	1	1	1	1	5
IV	7	"Beat of Broken Hearts"	1	1	1	1	1	1	1	1	8
IV	8	"Best of Me"	0	0	0	0	0	0	0	0	0

== Final ==
The final took place on 13 March 2021. A record-breaking 16,752,439 votes were cast, using 1,159,881 devices (which is a record for a final).

R/O	Artist	Song	Juries	Public	Total	Place
1	Danny Saucedo	"Dandi dansa"	39	35	74	7
2	Klara Hammarström	"Beat of Broken Hearts"	43	36	79	6
3	Anton Ewald	"New Religion"	9	16	25	11
4	The Mamas	"In the Middle"	50	56	106	3
5	Paul Rey	"The Missing Piece"	18	7	25	12
6	Charlotte Perrelli	"Still Young"	32	28	60	8
7	Tusse	"Voices"	79	96	175	1
8	Alvaro Estrella	"Bailá Bailá"	7	19	26	10
9	Clara Klingenström	"Behöver inte dig idag"	39	52	91	5
10	Eric Saade	"Every Minute"	69	49	118	2
11	Dotter	"Little Tot"	57	48	105	4
12	Arvingarna	"Tänker inte alls gå hem"	22	22	44	9

Detailed international jury votes
R/O	Song	France	Albania	Iceland	Israel	United Kingdom	Switzerland	Cyprus	Netherlands	Total
R/O	Song	France	Albania	Iceland	Israel	United Kingdom	Switzerland	Cyprus	Netherlands	Total
1	"Dandi dansa"	3	3	7	3	6	6	6	5	39
2	"Beat of Broken Hearts"	8	4	8	8	4	5	2	4	43
3	"New Religion"	2	2		2		2		1	9
4	"In the Middle"	6	6	6	4	12	8	1	7	50
5	"The Missing Piece"	1	5	2	1		3		6	18
6	"Still Young"	5	1	3	7	5	1	10		32
7	"Voices"	12	10	12	10	7	12	4	12	79
8	"Bailá Bailá"			1		1		5		7
9	"Behöver inte dig idag"	10	7	10	5	2		3	2	39
10	"Every Minute"	4	8	5	12	8	10	12	10	69
11	"Little Tot"	7	12	4	6	10	7	8	3	57
12	"Tänker inte alls gå hem"					3	4	7	8	22
International jury spokespersons
France – Bruno Berberes; Albania – Kleart Duraj; Iceland – Felix Bergsson; Israel – Tali Eshkoli; United Kingdom – Simon Proctor; Switzerland – Zibbz; Cyprus – Alexia Moutafidou; Netherlands – Lars Lourenco

Detailed televoting results
R/O	Song	Votes	Age groups							Tel.	Total
R/O	Song	Votes	3‍–‍9	10‍–‍15	16‍–‍29	30‍–‍44	45‍–‍59	60‍–‍74	75+	Tel.	Total
1	"Dandi dansa"	1,309,741	10	6	6	4	4	1	1	3	35
2	"Beat of Broken Hearts"	1,341,566	8	8	5	5	3	2	3	2	36
3	"New Religion"	1,066,340	7	4	3	2					16
4	"In the Middle"	1,646,198	3	10	10	10	7	6	6	4	56
5	"The Missing Piece"	998,030	2	3	2						7
6	"Still Young"	1,016,557				1	5	8	8	6	28
7	"Voices"	2,964,269	12	12	12	12	12	12	12	12	96
8	"Bailá Bailá"	1,071,188	5	2	1	3	2	3	2	1	19
9	"Behöver inte dig idag"	1,455,605	1	1	4	6	10	10	10	10	52
10	"Every Minute"	1,471,324	4	5	7	7	8	5	5	8	49
11	"Little Tot"	1,488,599	6	7	8	8	6	4	4	5	48
12	"Tänker inte alls gå hem"	923,022					1	7	7	7	22
