= Efraim Leo =

Swedish singer and songwriter

- Birth name: Efraim Faramir Sixten Fransesco Vindalf Cederqvist Leo
- Born: 5 October 1997 (age 27); Stockholm, Sweden
- Genres: Pop
- Occupations: Singer; songwriter
- Years active: 2016–present
- Labels: Sony Music
- Website: www.efraimleo.com

Efraim Faramir Sixten Fransesco Vindalf Cederqvist Leo (born October 5, 1997 in Stockholm) is a Swedish singer and songwriter. He took part in Melodifestivalen 2021 with the song "Best of Me".

== Career ==
Efraim Leo first came to prominence in 2016 when he was featured on the single "Show You the Light" by MARC (Markus Lidén). The song rose to #12 on the Billboard Dance Club Songs Chart. He released his debut single "You Got Me Wrong" in 2018 and his debut EP "Timing" together with two singles "One of Them Girls" and "Talk to Me" in 2020. He has written songs for the South Korean girl group Red Velvet, the Russian-Azerbaijani singer Emin among others.

Efraim participated in Melodifestivalen 2021 with the song "Best of Me" which he co-wrote with Cornelia Jakobsdotter, Amanda Björkegren and Herman Gardarfve. He competed in the fourth round where he moved to "second chance" round.

== Discography ==
=== EPs ===
Title	Year	Peak chart positions	Certification
Title	Year	SWE	Certification
Timing	2020	—	

=== Singles ===
Title	Year	Peak chart positions	Album
Title	Year	SWE	Album
"You Got Me Wrong" (featuring Juliette Claire)	2018	—	
"Talk to Me"	2020	—	
"One of Them Girls"	2020	—	
"When I Wanted You"	2020	—	
"Best of Me"	2021	21	Melodifestivalen 2021
"Somebody Else" (with Celina Sharma)	2021	—	TBA
"Do You Know (The Ping Pong Song)"	2021	—	-

=== Featured in ===
Title	Year	Peak chart positions		Album
Title	Year	SWE	US Billboard Dance Club Songs	Album
"Show You the Light" (MARC featuring Efraim Leo)	2016	88	12	
