= Anton Ewald =

Swedish singer and dancer (born 1993)

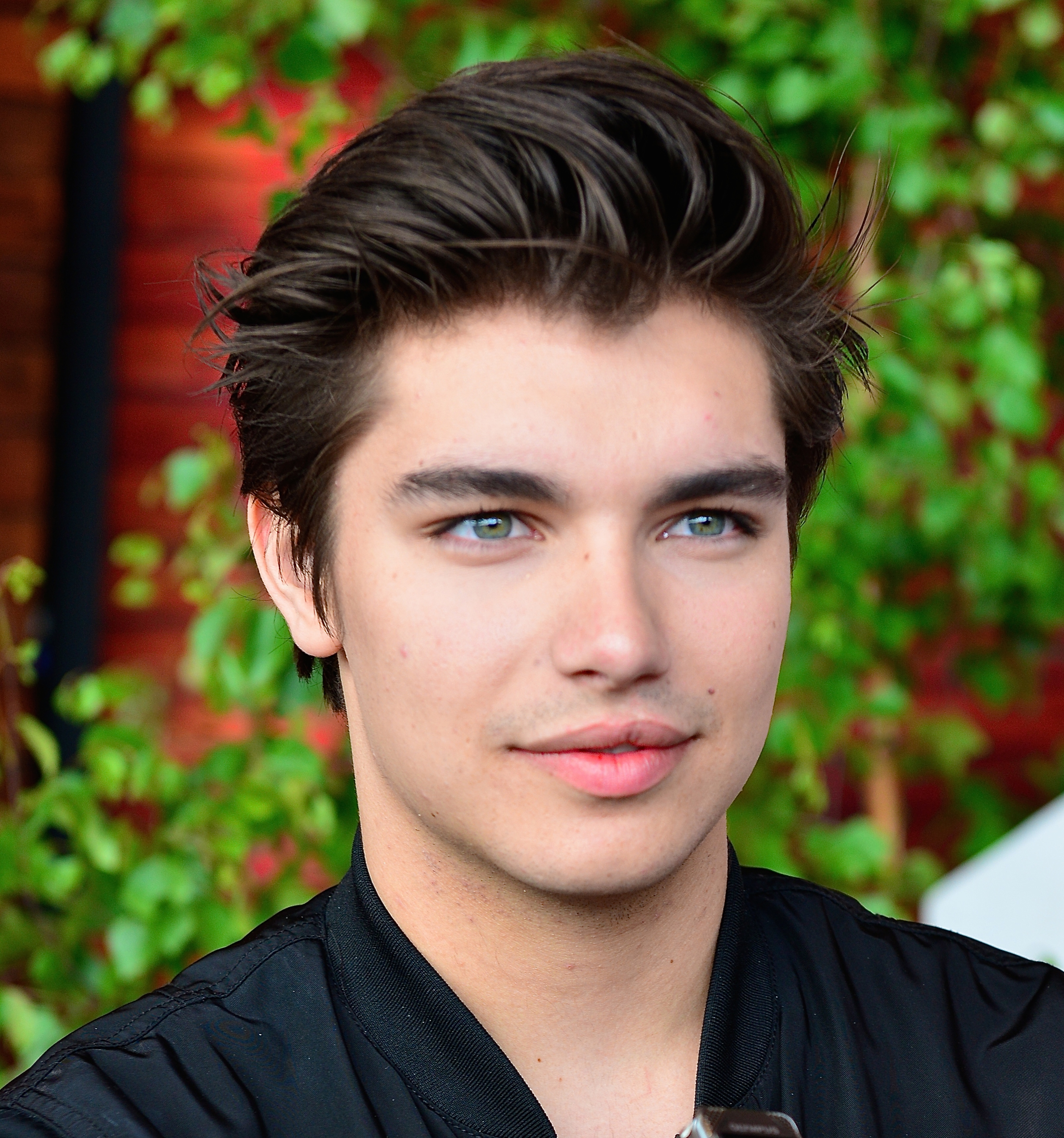
- Anton Ewald in 2013

Background information
- Born: Anton Kim Ewald; 7 August 1993 (age 33); Sweden
- Genres: Pop
- Occupations: Singer, choreographer, dancer
- Instrument: Vocals
- Years active: 2009 – present

Anton Kim Ewald (born 7 August 1993) is a Swedish singer and dancer. He has participated in Melodifestivalen several times as both a background dancer and singer.

== Career ==
Ewald began his career as a background dancer at Melodifestivalen. In Melodifestivalen 2009, he danced behind Velvet when she competed in the third semi-final in Leksand with "The Queen". In Melodifestivalen 2012 he was a dancer and choreographer behind Danny Saucedo in his song "Amazing". He also danced and choreographed Andreas Lundstedt number "Aldrig aldrig" ("Never Never") during the same year's competition.

Ewald participated in Melodifestivalen 2013, the selection process for picking the Swedish entry to the Eurovision Song Contest with the song "Begging" written by Fredrik Kempe, Anton Malmberg Hård af Segerstad. After his semi-final performance on 9 February 2013, he placed third and was given a chance to take part in the "Second chance" round that was held in Löfbergs Lila Arena in Karlstad to qualify for the national final. Ewald choreographed the appearance himself.

At the Second Chance round held on 2 March 2013, he qualified for the national final in Friends Arena on 9 March after a final duel with Behrang Miri and his song "Jalla Dansa Sawa". Ewald became one of just two acts from the Second Chance round to qualify for the final, the other qualifier being Robin Stjernberg with his song "You". In the final of Melodifestivalen 2013 on 9 March 2013, Ewald finished fourth. After Melodifestivalen he released two music singles, "Begging" and "Can't Hold Back", and two EPs, A and A-coustic.

Anton participated once again in Melodifestivalen 2014, performing the song "Natural" in the fourth and last semi-final on 22 February. He made it to the final where he came in tenth place. In that same year, he also released an EP titled On My Way, which contains the song This Could Be Something, a collaboration with Medina. In 2015, he released the single Higher, which is a collaboration with the Italian producer DJ Mirko B, three singles, Vill ha dig, Okej, and Du & Jag, and an EP in Swedish, Studio 18.

In 2016 and 2017, Anton worked with Rami Yacoub and released the singles Devil, L.I.L.Y (Like I Love You) and She Don't. The music videos for the singles were directed by Victoria Fajardo.

He participated in Melodifestivalen 2021, held at Annexet in Stockholm, with the song New Religion, where he qualified directly to the grand final, which was held on 13 March 2021, where he placed 11th. After Melodifestivalen 2021, he released two singles in that same year, DeLorean and That Should Be Me.

In 2022, Anton was featured in the song Made It Out by American rapper Apollo Lofton and in 2023, he got a starring role in the Swedish production of Moulin Rouge! as Santiago. The musical is held at Chinateatern in Stockholm from 14 September 2023 until 28 April 2024.

== Discography ==
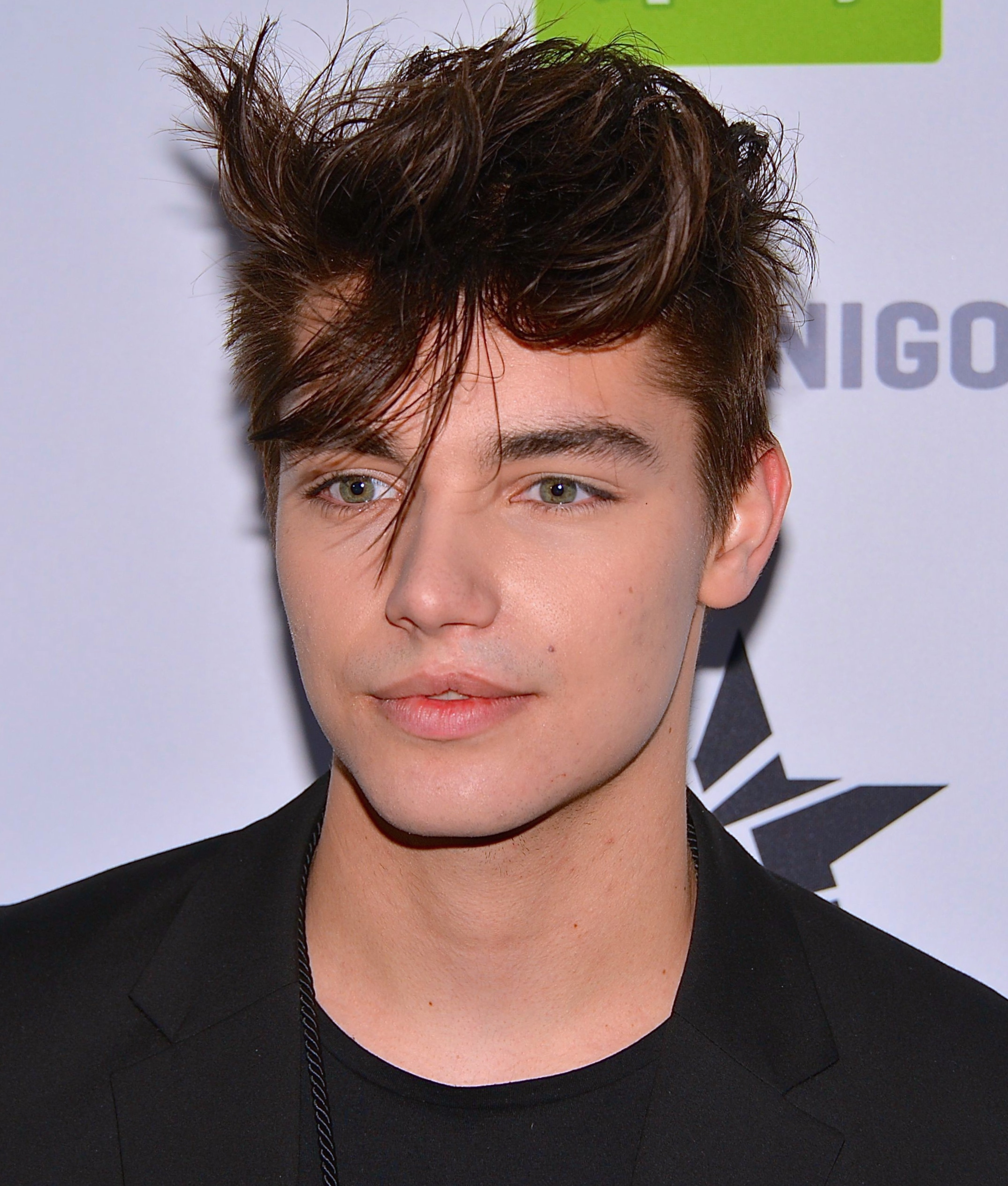
Anton Ewald (2013)

=== Extended plays ===
| Title | Details |
|---|---|
| A | Released: 1 January 2013; Label: Universal Music AB; Format: Digital download |
| A-coustic | Released: 1 January 2013; Label: Universal Music AB; Format: Digital download |
| On My Way | Released: 1 January 2014; Label: Universal Music AB; Format: Digital download |
| Studio 18 | Released: 8 October 2015; Label: Universal Music AB; Format: Digital download |

=== Singles ===
| Title | Year | Peak chart positions | Certifications | Album |
| Title | Year | SWE | Certifications | Album |
|---|---|---|---|---|
| "Begging" | 2013 | 2 | GLF: 3× Platinum | A |
| "Can't Hold Back" | 2013 | — | | A |
| "Close Up" | 2013 | — | | Non-album singles |
| "Natural" | 2014 | 24 | GLF: Gold | Non-album singles |
| "This Could Be Something" (featuring Medina) | 2014 | 21 | | On My Way |
| "Du & Jag" | 2015 | — | | Studio 18 |
| "Vill Ha Dig" | 2015 | — | | Non-album single |
| "Higher" (with D.j. Mirko B.) | 2015 | — | | Non-album single |
| "Okej" | 2015 | — | | Studio 18 |
| "Devil" | 2016 | — | | Non-album singles |
| "L.I.L.Y." | 2017 | — | | Non-album singles |
| "She Don't" | 2017 | — | | Non-album singles |
| "New Religion" | 2021 | 11 | | Non-album singles |
| "DeLorean" | 2021 | — | | Non-album singles |
| "That Should Be Me" | 2021 | — | | Non-album singles |
"—" denotes a recording that did not chart or was not released in that territory.
