= Sweden in the Eurovision Song Contest 2022 =

- Eurovision Song Contest 2022
- Participating broadcaster: Sveriges Television (SVT)
- Country: Sweden
- Selection process: Melodifestivalen 2022
- Selection date: 12 March 2022

Competing entry
- Song: "Hold Me Closer"
- Artist: Cornelia Jakobs
- Songwriters: Isa Molin; David Zandén; Cornelia Jakobsdotter

Placement
- Semi-final result: Qualified (1st, 396 points)
- Final result: 4th, 438 points

Participation chronology

Sweden was represented at the Eurovision Song Contest 2022 with the song "Hold Me Closer", written by Isa Molin, David Zandén, and Cornelia Jakobsdotter, and performed by Jakobsdotter herself under her stage name Cornelia Jakobs. The Swedish participating broadcaster, Sveriges Television (SVT), organised Melodifestivalen 2022 in order to select its entry for the contest.

== Background ==
Prior to the 2022 contest, Sveriges Radio (SR) until 1979, and Sveriges Television (SVT) since 1980, had participated in the Eurovision Song Contest representing Sweden sixty times since SR's first entry in 1958. Sweden had won the contest on six occasions: in 1974 with the song "Waterloo" performed by ABBA, in 1984 with the song "Diggi-Loo Diggi-Ley" performed by Herreys, in 1991 with the song "Fångad av en stormvind" performed by Carola, in 1999 with the song "Take Me to Your Heaven" performed by Charlotte Nilsson, in 2012 with the song "Euphoria" performed by Loreen, and in 2015 with the song "Heroes" performed by Måns Zelmerlöw. Following the introduction of semi-finals for the 2004 contest, Sweden's entries, to this point, have featured in every final, except for 2010. This includes its 2021 entry, "Voices", performed by Tusse, which ended 14th with 109 points in the final.

As part of its duties as participating broadcaster, SVT organises the selection of its entry in the Eurovision Song Contest and broadcasts the event in the country. Since 1959, SR first and SVT later have organised the annual competition Melodifestivalen in order to select their entries for the contest.

== Before Eurovision ==
=== Melodifestivalen 2022 ===
The 2022 edition of Melodifestivalen featured four heats, a semi-finals show (replacing the previously-held Second Chance round) and a final, and saw 28 acts compete. It was held between 5 February and 12 March 2022 in Stockholm, with the first three heats held at the Avicii Arena, and the remaining heat, the semi-finals and the final at the Friends Arena.

==== Heats ====
- The first heat took place on 5 February 2022. "Hold Me Closer" performed by Cornelia Jakobs and "Innocent Love" performed by Robin Bengtsson qualified directly to the final, while "Hallabaloo" performed by Danne Stråhed and "Som du vill" performed by Theoz advanced to the semi-final. "Moving Like That" performed by Omar Rudberg, "Let There Be Angels" performed by Shirley Clamp, and "Bananas" performed by Malou Prytz were eliminated from the contest.
- The second heat took place on 12 February 2022. "Bluffin" performed by Liamoo and "Änglavakt" performed by John Lundvik qualified directly to the final, while "Suave" performed by Alvaro Estrella and "My Way" performed by Tone Sekelius advanced to the semi-final. "I Want to Be Loved" performed by Samira Manners, "Face in the Crowd" performed by Browsing Collection, and "Tror du att jag bryr mig" performed by Niello and Lisa Ajax were eliminated from the contest.
- The third heat took place on 19 February 2022. "Bigger Than the Universe" performed by Anders Bagge and "Freedom" performed by Faith Kakembo qualified directly to the final, while "Best to Come" performed by Lisa Miskovsky and "I Can't Get Enough" performed by Cazzi Opeia advanced to the semi-final. "Fyrfaldigt hurra!" performed by Linda Bengtzing, "Lyckligt slut" performed by Lancelot, and "Shut Me Up" performed by Tribe Friday were eliminated from the contest.
- The fourth heat took place on 26 February 2022. "Run to the Hills" performed by Klara Hammarström and "In i dimman" performed by Medina qualified directly to the final, while "Higher Power" performed by Anna Bergendahl and "Till Our Days Are Over" performed by Lillasyster advanced to the semi-final. "The End" performed by Angelino, "La stella" performed by Tenori, and "Synd om dig" performed by Malin Christin were eliminated from the contest.
- The semi-finals took place as part of one show on 5 March 2022. From the first semi-final, "Higher Power" performed by Anna Bergendahl, and "My Way" performed by Tone Sekelius qualified to the final, while "Suave" performed by Alvaro Estrella, and "Hallabaloo" performed by Danne Stråhed were eliminated from the contest. From the second semi-final, "Som du vill" performed by Theoz, and "I Can't Get Enough" performed by Cazzi Opeia qualified to the final, while "Till Our Days Are Over" performed by Lillasyster, and "Best to Come" performed by Lisa Miskovsky were eliminated from the contest.

==== Final ====
The final took place on 12 March 2022.

R/O	Artist	Song	Juries	Televote	Total	Place
1	Klara Hammarström	"Run to the Hills"	27	56	83	6
2	Theoz	"Som du vill"	39	26	65	7
3	Anna Bergendahl	"Higher Power"	11	18	29	12
4	John Lundvik	"Änglavakt"	43	17	60	8
5	Tone Sekelius	"My Way"	31	53	84	5
6	Anders Bagge	"Bigger than the Universe"	31	90	121	2
7	Robin Bengtsson	"Innocent Love"	29	5	34	11
8	Faith Kakembo	"Freedom"	33	18	51	10
9	Liamoo	"Bluffin"	65	26	91	4
10	Cornelia Jakobs	"Hold Me Closer"	76	70	146	1
11	Cazzi Opeia	"I Can't Get Enough"	26	29	55	9
12	Medina	"In i dimman"	53	56	109	3

== At Eurovision ==
According to Eurovision rules, all nations with the exceptions of the host country and the "Big Five" (France, Germany, Italy, Spain and the United Kingdom) are required to qualify from one of two semi-finals in order to compete for the final; the top ten countries from each semi-final progress to the final. The European Broadcasting Union (EBU) split up the competing countries into six different pots based on voting patterns from previous contests, with countries with favourable voting histories put into the same pot. On 25 January 2022, an allocation draw was held which placed each country into one of the two semi-finals, as well as which half of the show they would perform in. Sweden was placed into the second semi-final, to be held on 12 May 2022, and scheduled to perform in the second half of the show.

Once all the competing songs for the 2022 contest had been released, the running order for the semi-finals was decided by the shows' producers rather than through another draw, so that similar songs were not placed next to each other. Sweden was set to perform in position 17, following the entry from Belgium and before the entry from the Czech Republic.

=== Voting ===
==== Points awarded to Sweden ====
Points awarded to Sweden (Semi-final 2)
Score	Televote	Jury
12 points	Israel; Poland; Romania	Australia; Azerbaijan; Cyprus; Czech Republic; Estonia; Finland; Georgia; Ireland; Israel; Malta; Montenegro; Poland; Romania; San Marino; Serbia; United Kingdom
10 points	Australia; Belgium; Estonia; Finland; Ireland; Malta; San Marino	Belgium
8 points	Azerbaijan; Georgia; Germany; Spain	
7 points	Cyprus; North Macedonia	Germany; North Macedonia
6 points	Czech Republic; Montenegro	Spain
5 points	Serbia; United Kingdom	
4 points		
3 points		
2 points		
1 point		

Points awarded to Sweden (Final)
Score	Televote	Jury
12 points		Estonia; Finland; Iceland; Israel; United Kingdom
10 points	Denmark; Estonia; Lithuania; Poland	Australia; Czech Republic; Ireland; Latvia; Malta; Poland; Romania
8 points	Finland; Iceland; Norway	Albania; Azerbaijan; Georgia; Moldova; Norway
7 points	Armenia; Portugal	Austria; Belgium; Denmark; Germany; Montenegro; Spain; Switzerland
6 points	Austria; Latvia; Romania; Spain	North Macedonia
5 points	Australia; Belgium; Czech Republic; Germany; Israel; Italy; Malta; Moldova; Slovenia	Armenia; Croatia; Cyprus; San Marino; Serbia
4 points	Azerbaijan; Croatia; Greece; North Macedonia; United Kingdom	Ukraine
3 points	Ireland; San Marino; Switzerland	Lithuania
2 points	Netherlands	
1 point	Montenegro; Serbia	Netherlands

==== Points awarded by Sweden ====
Points awarded by Sweden (Semi-final 2)
Score	Televote	Jury
12 points	Finland	Australia
10 points	Serbia	Estonia
8 points	Estonia	Belgium
7 points	Poland	Malta
6 points	Czech Republic	Czech Republic
5 points	Belgium	Azerbaijan
4 points	Australia	Finland
3 points	Romania	Israel
2 points	Malta	Cyprus
1 point	Cyprus	Poland

Points awarded by Sweden (Final)
Score	Televote	Jury
12 points	Ukraine	Spain
10 points	Norway	Australia
8 points	Serbia	United Kingdom
7 points	Finland	Azerbaijan
6 points	United Kingdom	Estonia
5 points	Poland	Czech Republic
4 points	Estonia	Serbia
3 points	Lithuania	Norway
2 points	Spain	Armenia
1 point	Netherlands	Belgium

==== Detailed voting results ====
The following members comprised the Swedish jury:

- Josefin Glenmark
- Michael Cederberg
- Miriam Annika Ehi Aigbogun
- Tara
- Tusse

Detailed voting results from Sweden (Semi-final 2)
R/O	Country	Jury							Televote	
R/O	Country	Juror A	Juror B	Juror C	Juror D	Juror E	Rank	Points	Rank	Points
01	Finland	14	5	7	3	6	7	4	1	12
02	Israel	5	7	12	2	12	8	3	14	
03	Serbia	13	8	15	10	11	15		2	10
04	Azerbaijan	7	3	3	9	13	6	5	16	
05	Georgia	11	17	17	17	17	17		13	
06	Malta	2	2	10	16	9	4	7	9	2
07	San Marino	16	6	16	12	7	13		12	
08	Australia	3	1	1	1	14	1	12	7	4
09	Cyprus	4	15	6	11	4	9	2	10	1
10	Ireland	9	16	9	14	8	14		11	
11	North Macedonia	15	10	14	7	5	12		15	
12	Estonia	1	9	4	4	10	2	10	3	8
13	Romania	8	12	11	13	3	11		8	3
14	Poland	10	11	2	6	16	10	1	4	7
15	Montenegro	17	14	13	15	15	16		17	
16	Belgium	12	4	8	5	1	3	8	6	5
17	Sweden									
18	Czech Republic	6	13	5	8	2	5	6	5	6

Detailed voting results from Sweden (Final)
R/O	Country	Jury							Televote	
R/O	Country	Juror A	Juror B	Juror C	Juror D	Juror E	Rank	Points	Rank	Points
01	Czech Republic	16	5	7	3	21	6	5	20	
02	Romania	12	11	16	7	18	16		14	
03	Portugal	9	17	3	18	22	14		19	
04	Finland	6	18	15	11	6	13		4	7
05	Switzerland	15	20	19	24	9	22		22	
06	France	21	23	20	19	23	24		21	
07	Norway	20	1	9	12	19	8	3	2	10
08	Armenia	23	21	10	4	4	9	2	12	
09	Italy	22	22	2	13	11	12		16	
10	Spain	1	24	5	1	5	1	12	9	2
11	Netherlands	14	19	14	9	10	19		10	1
12	Ukraine	8	12	11	10	12	15		1	12
13	Germany	11	13	17	17	8	17		17	
14	Lithuania	10	9	22	14	13	18		8	3
15	Azerbaijan	5	6	4	20	3	4	7	24	
16	Belgium	7	14	21	2	15	10	1	13	
17	Greece	19	3	8	21	7	11		23	
18	Iceland	17	8	18	23	14	21		18	
19	Moldova	24	16	23	6	24	20		11	
20	Sweden									
21	Australia	2	4	13	16	1	2	10	15	
22	United Kingdom	13	10	1	8	2	3	8	5	6
23	Poland	18	15	12	22	16	23		6	5
24	Serbia	3	7	24	5	17	7	4	3	8
25	Estonia	4	2	6	15	20	5	6	7	4
