= Jimmy Thörnfeldt =

Swedish songwriter and producer (born 1976)

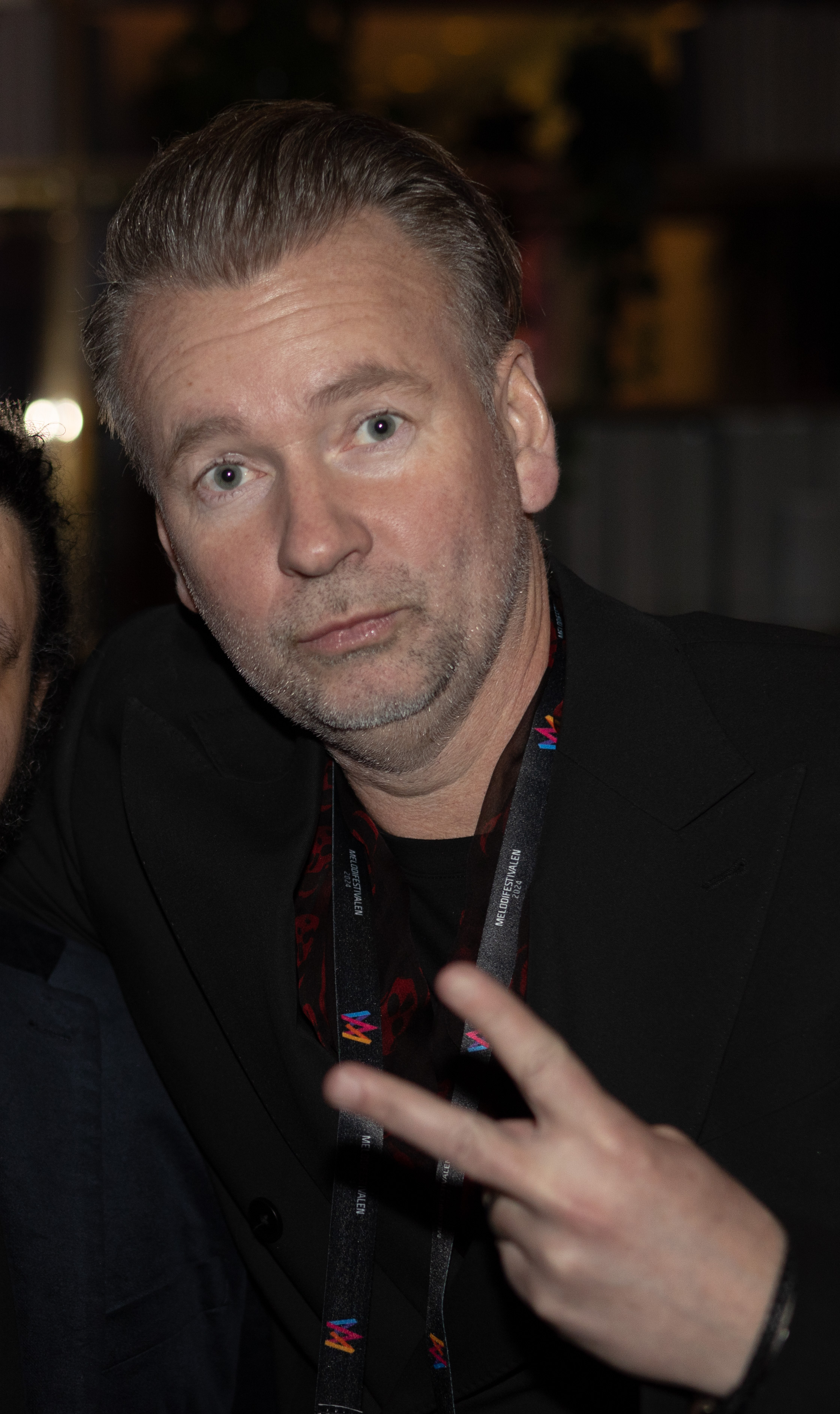
- Thörnfeldt at Melodifestivalen 2024

Background information
- Also known as: Jimmy Joker; Joker
- Born: Paul Jimmy Thörnfeldt; 14 March 1976 (age 50); Norrköping, Sweden
- Genres: Pop; dance-pop; reggaeton; Latin; hip hop; euro-dance
- Occupations: Songwriter; record producer
- Years active: 1994–present

Paul Jimmy Thörnfeldt (born 14 March 1976), also known professionally as Jimmy Joker or simply Joker, is a Swedish songwriter and record producer. As a songwriter, he has taken part in Melodifestivalen and the Eurovision Song Contest several times.

== Biography ==
Jimmy "Joker" Thörnfeldt is an established name on the international songwriting scene. He has worked with artists such as One Direction, Jennifer Lopez, Lady Gaga, Pitbull and Enrique Iglesias. In 2016, Pitbull's album Dale, on which Thörnfeldt contributed as a songwriter and producer, won a Grammy in the Best Latin Rock or Alternative Album category.

Since 2021, Thörnfeldt has been involved as a songwriter in several contributions to the Swedish national selection for the Eurovision Song Contest, Melodifestivalen. He has also taken part in the Eurovision Song Contest numerous times as a songwriter.

== Songwriting discography ==
=== Eurovision Song Contest entries ===
Year	Country	Song	Artist	Co-written with	Final	Points	Semi	Points
2021	Cyprus	"El diablo"	Elena Tsagrinou	Laurell Barker, Oxa, Thomas Stengaard	16	94	6	170
2021	San Marino	"Adrenalina"	Senhit	Chanel Tukia, Tramar Dillard, Joy Deb, Kenny Silverdique, Linnea Deb, Malou Linn Eloise Ruotsalainen, Senhit Zadik Zadik, Suzi Pancenkov, Thomas Stengaard	22	50	9	118
2021	Sweden	"Voices"	Tusse	Joy Deb, Linnea Deb, Anderz Wrethov	14	109	7	142
2023	Cyprus	"Break a Broken Heart"	Andrew Lambrou	Jimmy Jansson, Marcus Winther-John, Thomas Stengaard	12	126	7	94
2023	Sweden	"Tattoo"	Loreen	Jimmy Jansson, Lorine Talhaoui, Moa Carlebecker, Peter Boström, Thomas G:son	1	583	2	135
2024	Austria	"We Will Rave"	Kaleen	Anderz Wrethov, Julie Aagaard, Thomas Stengaard	24	24	9	46
2024	Sweden	"Unforgettable"	Marcus & Martinus	Joy Deb, Linnea Deb, Marcus Gunnarsen, Martinus Gunnarsen	9	174	Host country	

=== Notable productions ===
- 2010: Usher: "More"
- 2011: Jennifer Lopez: "Papi"
- 2011: Jennifer Lopez: "Invading My Mind"
- 2011: Jennifer Lopez: "Hypnotico"
- 2011: Jennifer Lopez: "Charge Me Up"
- 2011: Nicole Scherzinger: "Poison"
- 2011: Nicole Scherzinger: "Say Yes"
- 2011: Nicole Scherzinger: "Everybody"
- 2011: Pitbull: "Rain Over Me"
- 2020: Basshunter: "Angels Ain't Listening"

=== Melodifestivalen entries ===
- 2011: Love Generation: "Dance Alone" (Andra Chansen)
- 2021: Tusse: "Voices" (1st place)
- 2021: Eric Saade: "Every Minute" (2nd place)
- 2021: Alvaro Estrella: "Bailá Bailá" (10th place)
- 2021: Emil Assergård: "Om allting skiter sig" (5th place in heat)
- 2021: Kadiatou: "One Touch" (6th place in heat)
- 2022: Medina: "In i dimman" (3rd place)
- 2022: Liamoo: "Bluffin" (4th place)
- 2022: Klara Hammarström: "Run to the Hills" (6th place)
- 2022: Theoz: "Som du vill" (7th place)
- 2022: Alvaro Estrella: "Suave" (Semi-final)
- 2022: Malou Prytz: "Bananas" (7th place in heat)
- 2023: Loreen: "Tattoo" (1st place)
- 2023: Marcus & Martinus: "Air" (2nd place)
- 2023: Smash Into Pieces: "Six Feet Under" (3rd place)
- 2023: Kiana: "Where Did You Go" (6th place)
- 2023: Paul Rey: "Royals" (7th place)
- 2023: Tone Sekelius: "Rhythm of My Show" (12th place)
- 2024: Albin Tingwall: "Done Getting Over You" (7th place in final qualification)
- 2024: Liamoo: "Dragon" (5th place)
- 2024: Marcus & Martinus: "Unforgettable" (1st place)
- 2024: Maria Sur: "When I'm Gone" (7th place)
- 2024: Medina: "Que Sera" (2nd place)
- 2024: Smash Into Pieces: "Heroes Are Calling" (3rd place)
- 2025: Angelino: "Teardrops" (4th place in heat)
- 2025: Arwin: "This Dream of Mine" (4th place in final qualification)
- 2025: Kaliffa: "Salute" (3rd place in final qualification)
- 2025: Maja Ivarsson: "Kamikaze Life" (11th place)
- 2025: Malou Prytz: "24K Gold" (3rd place in heat)
- 2025: Scarlet: "Sweet n' Psycho" (7th place)
- 2026: Medina: "Viva L'Amour" (3rd place)
- 2026: Meira Omar: "Dooset Daram" (9th place)
- 2026: Timo Räisänen: "Ingenting är efter oss" (4th place in heat)
