= Thomas G:son =

Swedish composer and musician

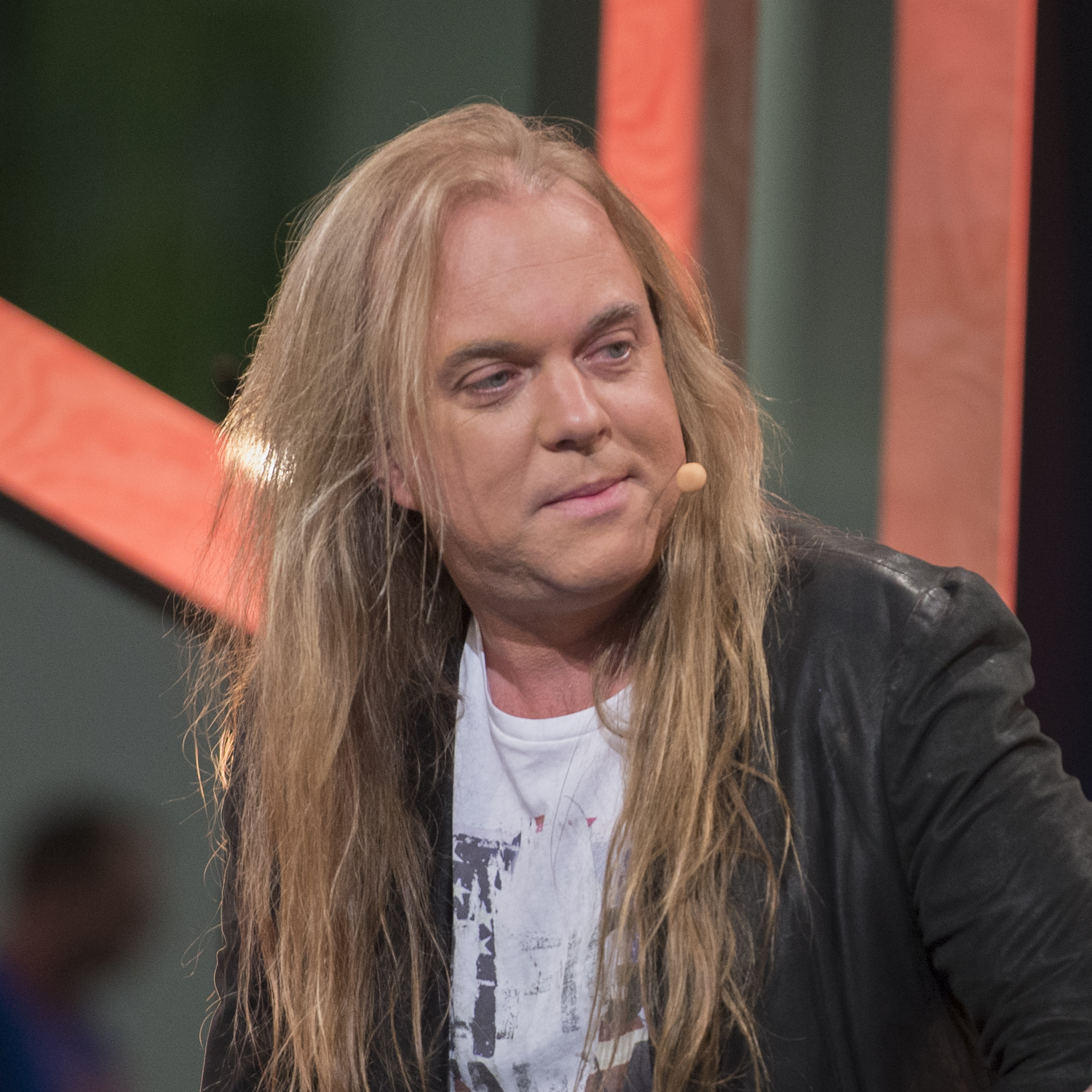
- G:son in 2013

Background information
- Born: Thomas Gustafsson; 25 February 1968 (age 58); Skövde, Sweden
- Genres: Pop; schlager; dance-pop; electropop
- Occupations: Composer; musician; music producer
- Years active: 1998–present

Thomas Gustafsson (born 25 February 1968), known professionally as Thomas G:son (Note: In Swedish orthography, a colon can indicate a contraction, like an apostrophe in English orthography.) (Swedish pronunciation: [ˈgěːsɔn]) is a Swedish composer and musician.

He is best known for the 117 songs he has written for the national selections of 12 countries for the Eurovision Song Contest: 74 for Sweden, 16 for Spain, six for Norway, five for Denmark and Finland, three for Georgia, two each for Poland, Malta and Cyprus and one each for Latvia, Romania, Belgium, Lithuania, Luxembourg and Armenia. His songs have also reached Eurovision 16 times: four times for Sweden, three times each for Spain and Georgia, twice for Cyprus and once each for Norway, Denmark, Malta and Armenia. In 2012, G:son achieved his first victory as a winning composer at the Eurovision Song Contest with "Euphoria", performed by Loreen. With the same artist in 2023, he won the contest for a second time.

Gustafsson has been a full-time songwriter since 1998. In addition to writing and composing songs in various genres for a living, he is the guitarist of the hard rock band Masquerade.

== Songwriting discography ==
=== Eurovision Song Contest ===
Year	Country	Song	Artist	Co-written with	Final	Points	Semi	Points
2001	Sweden	"Listen to Your Heartbeat"	Friends	Henrik Sethsson	5	100	No semi-finals	
2006	Sweden	"Invincible"	Carola	Bobby Ljunggren, Henrik Wikström, Carola Häggkvist	5	170	4	214
2007	Norway	"Ven a bailar conmigo"	Guri Schanke	—N/a	Failed to qualify		18	48
2007	Spain	"I Love You Mi Vida"	D'Nash	Andreas Rickstrand, Tony Sánchez-Ohlsson, Rebeca Pous del Toro	20	43	Member of the "Big 4"	
2010	Denmark	"In a Moment Like This"	Chanée and N'evergreen	Henrik Sethsson, Erik Bernholm	4	149	5	101
2012	Spain	"Quédate conmigo"	Pastora Soler	Tony Sánchez-Ohlsson, Erik Bernholm	10	97	Member of the "Big 5"	
2012	Sweden	"Euphoria"	Loreen	Peter Boström	1	372	1	181
2013	Georgia	"Waterfall"	Sopho Gelovani and Nodiko Tatishvili	Erik Bernholm	15	50	10	63
2015	Spain	"Amanecer"	Edurne	Peter Boström, Tony Sánchez-Ohlsson	21	15	Member of the "Big 5"	
2015	Georgia	"Warrior"	Nina Sublatti	Nina Sublatti	11	51	4	98
2016	Georgia	"Midnight Gold"	Nika Kocharov and Young Georgian Lolitaz	Kote Kalandadze	20	104	9	123
2016	Cyprus	"Alter Ego"	Minus One	Minus One	21	96	8	164
2017	Cyprus	"Gravity"	Hovig	—N/a	21	68	5	164
2018	Malta	"Taboo"	Christabelle	Johnny Sanchez, Christabelle Borg, Muxu	Failed to qualify		13	101
2020	France	"Mon alliée (The Best in Me)"	Tom Leeb	Peter Boström, John Lundvik, Amir Haddad, Tom Leeb, Léa Ivanne	Contest cancelled due to the COVID-19 pandemic			
2023	Sweden	"Tattoo"	Loreen	Jimmy "Joker" Thörnfeldt, Jimmy Jansson, Lorine Talhaoui, Moa Carlebecker, Peter Boström	1	583	2	135
2025	Armenia	"Survivor"	Parg	Alex Wilke, Armen Paul, Benjamin Alasu, Eva Voskanian, Joshua Curran, Martin Mooradian, Pargev Vardanian	20	72	10	51

=== Junior Eurovision ===
Year	Country	Song	Artist	Co-written with	Place	Points
2010	Sweden	"Allt jag vill ha"	Josefine Ridell	Arash Labbaf, Robert Uhlmann, Johan Bejerholm	11	48
2014	Sweden	"Du är inte ensam"	Julia Kedhammar	Julia Kedhammar	13	28

=== National final entries ===
==== Melodifestivalen entries (Sweden) ====
- "Natten är min vän" by Cleo Nilsson (1999), 8th place
- "Lyssna till ditt hjärta" ("Listen to Your Heartbeat") by Friends (2001), 1st place (5th place in Eurovision 2001)
- "Vem é dé du vill ha" by Kikki, Lotta and Bettan (2002), 3rd place
- "Ingenting är större än vi" by Arvingarna (2002), 6th place (heat)
- "Världen utanför" by Barbados (2002), 4th place
- "What Difference Does It Make?" by Poets (2002), 3rd place (heat)
- "Hela världen för mig" by Sanna Nielsen (2003), 5th place
- "C'est la vie" by Hanson, Carson and Malmkvist (2004), 10th place
- "Tango Tango" by Petra Nielsen (2004), 4th place
- "Säg att du har ångrat dig" by Anne-Lie Rydé (2004), 4th place (heat)
- "Långt bortom tid och rum" by Mathias Holmgren (2005), 4th place (heat)
- "As If Tomorrow Will Never Come" by Katrina and the Nameless (2005), 3rd place (heat)
- "Så nära" by Anne-Lie Rydé (2005), 5th place (heat)
- "Evighet" ("Invincible") by Carola (2006), 1st place (5th place in Eurovision 2006)
- "Ge mig en kaka till kaffet" by Östen med Resten (2006), 6th place (heat)
- "I dag & i morgon" by Kikki Danielsson (2006), 10th place
- "Innan natten är över" by Kayo (2006), 6th place (heat)
- "When Loves Coming Back Again" by Jessica Folcker (2006), 7th place (heat)
- "Silverland" by Roger Pontare (2006), 4th place (heat)
- "Amanda" by Jimmy Jansson (2007), eliminated in Second Chance round
- "Samba Sambero" by Anna Book (2007), 9th place
- "Här för mig själv" by Maja Gullstrand (2009), 8th place (heat)
- "Du vinner över mig" by Mikael Rickfors (2009), 5th place (heat)
- "Show Me Heaven" by Lili and Susie (2009), eliminated in Second Chance round
- "Thursdays" by Lovestoned (2010), 6th place (heat)
- "I'm in Love" by Sanna Nielsen (2011), 4th place
- "E de fel på mig?" by Linda Bengtzing (2011), 7th place
- "Something in Your Eyes" by Jenny Silver (2011), eliminated in Second Chance round
- "Euphoria" by Loreen (2012), 1st place (1st place in Eurovision 2012)
- "Jag reser mig igen" by Thorsten Flinck and Revolutionsorkestern (2012), 8th place
- "Land of Broken Dreams" by Dynazty (2012), eliminated in Second Chance round
- "On Top of the World" by Swedish House Wives (Pernilla Wahlgren, Jenny Silver and Hanna Hedlund) (2013), 6th place (heat)
- "Alibi" by Eddie Razaz (2013), 6th place (heat)
- "In and Out of Love" by Martin Rolinski (2013), eliminated in Second Chance round
- "Trivialitet" by Sylvia Vrethammar (2013), 7th place (heat)
- "Tell the World I'm Here" by Ulrik Munther (2013), 3rd place
- "Hela natten" by Josef Johansson (2014), 7th place (heat)
- "Love Trigger" by JEM (2014), 6th (Second Chance)
- "If I Was God for One Day" by Neverstore (2015), 5th place (heat)
- "Möt mig i Gamla stan" by Magnus Carlsson (2015), 9th place
- "Bring Out the Fire" by Andreas Weise (2015), eliminated in Second Chance round
- "För din Skull" by Kalle Johansson (2015), 6th place (heat)
- "Rollercoaster" by Dolly Style (2016), eliminated in Second Chance round
- "Himmel och hav" by Roger Pontare (2017), 5th place (heat)
- "A Million Years" by Mariette (2017), 4th place
- "One More Night" by Dinah Nah (2017), 5th place (heat)
- "Wild Child" by Ace Wilder (2017), 7th place
- "Cry" by Dotter (2018), 6th place (heat)
- "Livet på en pinne" by Edward Blom (2018), 5th place (heat)
- "Icarus" by Emmi Christensson (2018), 6th place (heat)
- "Min dröm" by Kalle Moraeus and Orsa Spelmän (2018), 5th place (heat)
- "Ashes to Ashes" by Anna Bergendahl (2019), 10th place
- "Hello" by Mohombi (2019), 5th place
- "Chasing Rivers" by Nano (2019), 8th place
- "Somebody Wants" by The Lovers of Valdaro (2019), 7th place (heat)
- "Mina bränder" by Zeana feat. Anis Don Demina (2019), 5th place (heat)
- "Kingdom Come" by Anna Bergendahl (2020), 3rd place
- "Ballerina" by Malou Prytz (2020), eliminated in Second Chance round
- "Shout It Out" by Mariette (2020), 10th place
- "Miraklernas tid" by Jan Johansen (2020), 7th place (heat)
- "Tänker inte alls gå hem" by Arvingarna (2021), 9th place
- "Still Young" by Charlotte Perrelli (2021), 8th place
- "Bigger than the Universe" by Anders Bagge (2022), 2nd place
- "Higher Power" by Anna Bergendahl (2022), 12th place
- "Fyrfaldigt hurra!" by Linda Bengtzing (2022), 5th place (heat)
- "Tattoo" by Loreen (2023), 1st place (1st place in Eurovision 2023)
- "One Day" by Mariette (2023), 8th place
- "Släpp alla sorger" by Nordman (2023), 11th place
- "Mer av dig" by Theoz (2023), 5th place
- "Give My Heart a Break" by Cazzi Opeia (2024), 4th place
- "Forever Yours" by Elisa Lindström (2024), 10th place (final qualification)
- "Effortless" by Jacqline (2024), 9th place
- "30 km/h" by Lia Larsson (2024), 4th place (heat)
- "Min melodi" by Melina Borglowe (2024), 5th place (heat)
- "Ring baby ring" by Arvingarna (2025), 4th place (heat)
- "The Heart of a Swedish Cowboy" by Fredrik Lundman (2025), 4th place (heat)
- "Voice of the Silent" by John Lundvik (2025), 6th place
- "On and On and On" by Klara Hammarström (2025), 4th place
- "Love It!" by Victoria Silvstedt (2025), 5th place (heat)
- "Iconic" by A-Teens (2026), 7th place
- "Woman" by Jacqline (2026), 3rd place (final qualification)
- "Waste Your Love" by Sanna Nielsen (2026), 10th place

==== Melodi Grand Prix entries (Norway) ====
- "Din hånd i min hånd" by Kikki, Lotta and Bettan (2003), 4th place
- "Anyway You Want It" by Ingvild Pedersen (2003), 8th place
- "Absolutely Fabulous" by Queentastic (2006), 3rd place
- "Ven a bailar conmigo" by Guri Schanke (2007), 1st place (18th place in Eurovision 2007 semi-final)
- "Rocket Ride" by Jannicke Abrahamsen (2007), 2nd place
- "High on Love" by Reidun Sæther (2012), failed to qualify

==== Dansk Melodi Grand Prix entries (Denmark) ====
- "In a Moment Like This" by Chanée and N'evergreen (2010), 1st place (4th place in Eurovision 2010)
- "Let Your Heart Be Mine" by Jenny Berggren (2011)
- "25 Hours a Day" by Le Freak (2011), 4th place
- "We Own the Universe" by Daze (2013), failed to qualify
- "Mi amore" by Tina and René (2015), 7th place

==== Euroviisut and Uuden Musiikin Kilpailu entries (Finland) ====
- "Who Cares About a Broken Heart?" by Johanna (2002), 5th place
- "Say You Will, Say You Won't" by Ressu (2002), 4th place
- "I Can't Stop Loving You" by Kirsi Ranto (2004), 10th place (semi-final)
- "Till the End of Time" by Arja Koriseva (2004), 10th place
- "Domino" by Saara Aalto (2018), 2nd place

==== Eirodziesma entry (Latvia) ====
- "Heaven in Your Eyes" by Elina Furmane (2006), 8th place

==== Selecţia Naţională entry (Romania) ====
- "Lovestruck" by Indiggo (2007) (disqualified)

==== Piosenka dla Europy entries (Poland) ====
- "Viva la musica" by Man Meadow (2008), 3rd place
- "Love Is Gonna Get You" by Man Meadow (2009), 6th place

==== Eurosong entry (Belgium) ====
- "Addicted to You" by Tanja Dexters (2008), 5th place (semi-final)

==== Spanish selection entries (Spain) ====
- "I Am as I Am" by Arkaitz (2007), failed to qualify
- "I Love You Mi Vida" by D'Nash (2007), 1st place (20th place in Eurovision 2007)
- "Todo está en tu mente" by Coral Segovia (2008), 2nd place
- "Piénsame" by Anael (2008), eliminated in online voting
- "Te prefiero" by Baltanás (2008), eliminated in online voting
- "Nada es comparable a ti" by Mirela (2009), 4th place
- "Amor radical" by Rebeca (2009), eliminated in online voting
- "Perfecta" by Venus (2010), 4th place
- "Recuérdame" by Samuel and Patricia (2010), 5th place
- "En una vida" by Coral Segovia (2010), 2nd place
- "Beautiful Life" by José Galisteo (2010), 7th place
- "Abrázame" by Lucía Pérez (2011), 2nd place in song selection
- "Quédate conmigo" by Pastora Soler (2012), 1st place (10th place in Eurovision 2012)
- "Más (Run)" by Brequette (2014), 2nd place
- "Eco" by Xeinn (2022), 7th place
- "Sé quién soy" by Angy Fernández (2024), 3rd place

==== Malta Eurovision Song Contest (Malta) ====
- "Ultraviolet" by Jessika Muscat (2013), 8th place
- "Taboo" by Christabelle (2018), 1st place (13th place in Eurovision 2018 semi-final)

==== Pabandom iš naujo! (Lithuania) ====
- "Unbreakable" by Aistė Pilvelytė (2020), 5th place

==== Luxembourg Song Contest (Luxembourg) ====
- "Hold On" by Chaild (2024), 8th place

==== Depi Evratesil (Armenia) ====
- "Survivor" by Parg (2025), 1st place (20th place in Eurovision 2025)

== Controversy ==
G:son and Henrik Sethsson's song for the Eurovision Song Contest 2001, "Listen to Your Heartbeat", was accused of plagiarism from Belgium's 1996 entry "Liefde is een kaartspel". The songwriters denied the accusation, but after the Belgian songwriters and the author's organisation SABAM pressed for legal action, a cash settlement was agreed.
