= Niello (disambiguation) =

Niello may refer to:

- Niello, a black mixture of metallic alloys, used as an inlay on engraved or etched metal.
- Roger Niello (born 1948), American politician, representative in California State Assembly
- Niello (rapper), Swedish rap and electronic hip hop artist
