= Angels Ain't Listening =

Single by Basshunter
- Released: 29 May 2020
- Genre: Cold wave
- Length: 2:49
- Label: Central Station Records; nextBird Records; Planetworks; PowerHouse; Roton; Teta Records; Yeni Dünya Müzik
- Songwriters: Basshunter; Jimmy Joker; Thomas G:son; Bilal Hajji
- Producer: Jimmy Joker

Basshunter singles chronology
| "Home" (2019) | "Angels Ain't Listening" (2020) | "Life Speaks to Me" (2021) |

Audio sample
- file; help

Lyric video
- "Angels Ain't Listening" on YouTube

"Angels Ain't Listening" is a song by Swedish musician Basshunter, released as a single on 29 May 2020 by Central Station Records, nextBird Records, Planetworks, PowerHouse, Roton, Teta Records, and Yeni Dünya Müzik. It was written by Basshunter, Jimmy Joker, Thomas G:son, and Bilal Hajji, and produced by Jimmy Joker. "Angels Ain't Listening" is Basshunter's first song he sings in seven years. It shows his emotional side and was inspired by the pop music of the 1980s. It peaked at number 27 on the Swiss Dance Chart.

== Background ==
"Angels Ain't Listening" is two minutes and 49 seconds long, and has a tempo of 153 beats per minute. The cold wave song was written by Basshunter, Jimmy Joker, Thomas G:son, and Bilal Hajji, and produced by Jimmy Joker. It reveals the emotional side of Basshunter and was inspired by 1980s pop music. It was Basshunter's first song he sings in seven years. He said he had lost his will to sing and did not have much self-confidence, having found the competition from other singers, who he felt had more personality and were better at singing than he was, too fierce. When he recorded "Angels Ain't Listening", he felt he could actually sing.

Basshunter described the song as being about having to find oneself before devoting one's life to someone else. He realized that having a good relationship with oneself is needed before becoming involved in a relationship. He said everyone makes mistakes and learns the hard way, but it is important to maintain a positive attitude and have fun throughout life.

== Release ==
Basshunter's previous single, "Home", had been released on 27 September 2019. Basshunter announced his new song "Angels Ain't Listening" and previewed a fragment during a 24 April 2020 interview with Scott Mills on BBC Radio 1. A fragment of the song was also played on the radio programme P3 Musikdokumentär broadcast by Sveriges Radio.

"Angels Ain't Listening" was released as a promotional single on 27 May 2020 by Central Station Records. Two days later, the song was publicly released by Central Station Records, nextBird Records, Planetworks, PowerHouse, Roton, Teta Records, and Yeni Dünya Müzik.

The track was added to the Swedish top download and stream playlist on 5 June 2020. "Angels Ain't Listening" became one of the most-downloaded foreign tracks by radio stations in Russia. It was also added to the lists of the best songs of the week by Dagens Nyheter and Zero Music Magazine. "Life Speaks to Me" is the next single released on 19 November 2021.

== Lyric video ==
A lyric video for "Angels Ain't Listening" directed by Jay Jayveesualz was released by Basshunter on 29 May 2020. It stars Oskar Sternulf as a man who is trying to deal with his loneliness and to nurture self-love and self-acceptance. Jayveesualz was looking for a man aged 35–50 years who could play a mentally unstable person, and used the comic-book character Joker played by Joaquin Phoenix in the 2019 film of the same name as an example. He received 40 applications and he and the record label chose Sternulf. Sternulf that said many people hide their negative emotions and pretend to be happy. He also said the director of the video hoped to alleviate the problem of mental illness during the COVID-19 pandemic. The video was filmed between 15 and 16 May in Södermalm, Stockholm.

== Reception ==
Professional ratings
Review scores
| Source | Rating |
|---|---|
| Mix 1 | 7/8 stars |

The release of "Angels Ain't Listening" was covered by the media including Aftonbladet, Bohusläningen, Bravo Net, Scandipop, and TV4 (Efter fem). Jonathan Currinn from CelebMix was impressed by Basshunter's deep vocal that allows listeners to sense his honesty and integrity. He asserted the song feels like one from the 1980s and with its disco-themed vibes it reminds him of the music of Pet Shop Boys. Currinn described the new side of Basshunter as interesting and said he was excited about further developments.

Mandy Rogers from EQ Music described the song's lyrics as quite dark and serious in comparison with the light-hearted topics covered on Basshunter's previous songs. Rogers said "Angels Ain't Listening" has themes of acceptance and loneliness; she also said she liked this more daring approach that conveys a huge, empowering message. Povel Arwidson from Hallandsposten regarded the song could conceivably be about his own marriage, which lasted less than a year before his divorce in 2018.

== Track listing ==
Digital download, streaming (29 May 2020)
| No. | Title | Length |
|---|---|---|
| 1. | "Angels Ain't Listening" | 2:49 |

== Personnel ==
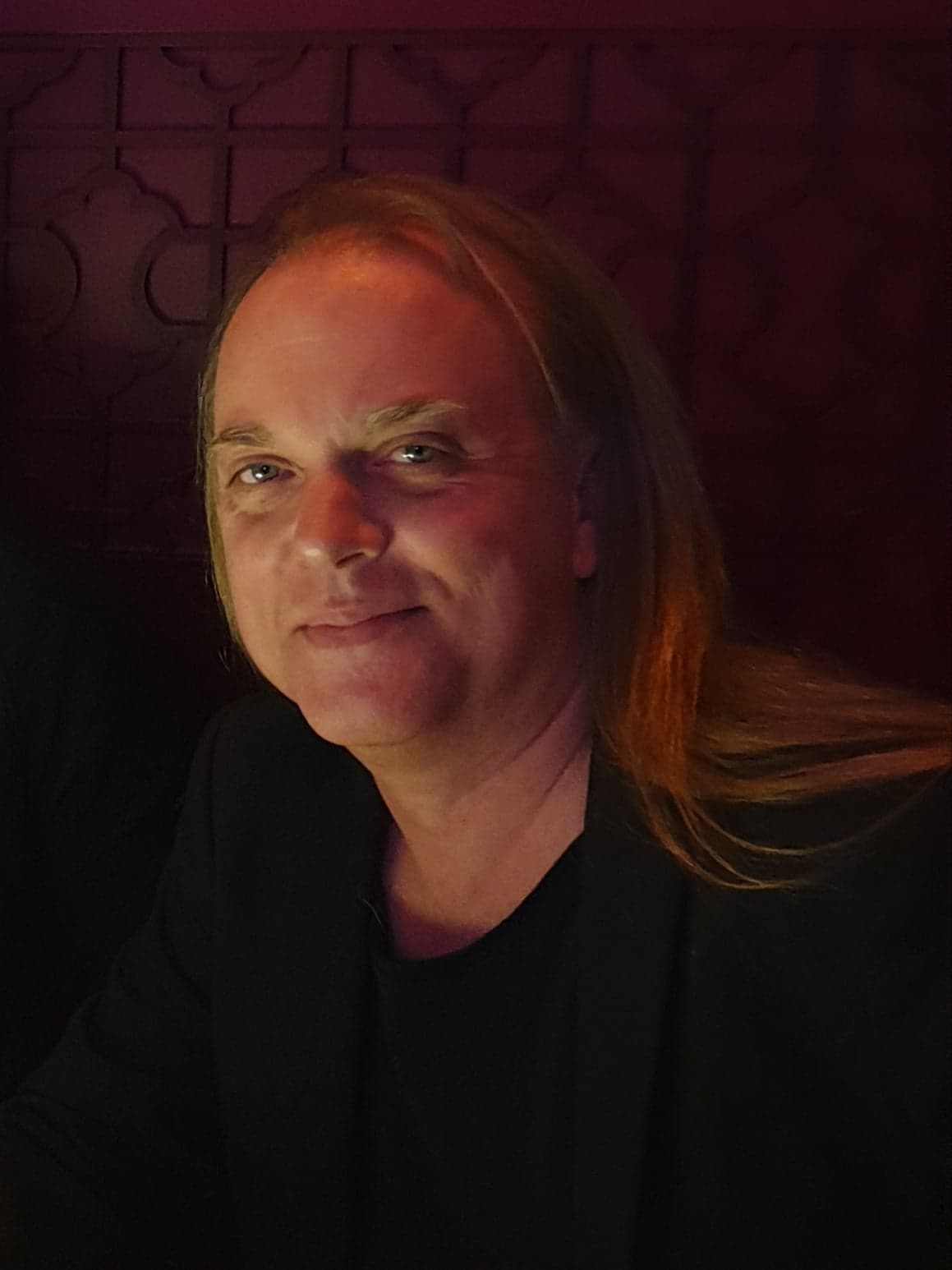
Thomas G:son was one of the writers of "Angels Ain't Listening".

Credits

- Writer – Basshunter, Jimmy Joker, Thomas G:son and Bilal Hajji
- Producer – Jimmy Joker

== Charts ==
Weekly chart performance for "Angels Ain't Listening"
| Chart (2020) | Peak position |
|---|---|
| Switzerland (Swiss Dance Chart) | 27 |
| Austria (DJ Charts Austria) | Proposed |

== Release history ==
| Date | Format | Label |
|---|---|---|
| 29 May 2020 | Digital download; streaming | Central Station Records nextBird Records; Planetworks; PowerHouse; Roton; Teta Records; Yeni Dünya Müzik |
| 5 June 2020 | Digital download; streaming | Artistars; PowerHouse |
