= Innocent Love =

Innocent Love may refer to:

- Innocent Love (Sandra song), 1986
- Innocent Love (Robin Bengtsson song), 2022
- Innocent Love (TV series), a Japanese television drama series

== See also ==
- An Innocent Love, a 1982 American made-for-television coming-of-age film
