= Greater Power =

Greater Power may refer to:

== In religion ==
- Deity
- God

== Other uses ==
- Greater Power (Dungeons & Dragons)

== See also ==
- Higher Power (disambiguation)
