= Melodifestivalen 2022 =

Swedish music competition

Dates and venues
- Heat 1: 5 February 2022
- Heat 2: 12 February 2022
- Heat 3: 19 February 2022; Avicii Arena, Stockholm
- Heat 4: 26 February 2022
- Semi-final: 5 March 2022
- Final: 12 March 2022; Friends Arena, Stockholm

Production
- Broadcaster: Sveriges Television (SVT)
- Director: Fredrik Bäcklund; Daniel Jelinek
- Artistic director: Karin Gunnarsson
- Presenters: All shows: Oscar Zia; Offstage and final co-host: Farah Abadi; Guest co-hosts: Eva Rydberg (heat 2); Johanna Nordström (heat 3)

Participants
- Number of entries: 28
- Number of finalists: 12

Vote
- Voting system: Heats and Semi-final: 100% public vote Final: 50% public vote, 50% jury vote
- Winning song: "Hold Me Closer" by Cornelia Jakobs

Melodifestivalen 2022 was the 62nd edition of the Swedish music competition Melodifestivalen, which was organised by Sveriges Television (SVT) and took place over a six-week period between 5 February and 12 March 2022. The winner of the competition was Cornelia Jakobs with the song "Hold Me Closer", who represented Sweden in the Eurovision Song Contest 2022, where she came fourth with 438 points. All shows were hosted by Oscar Zia.

== Format ==
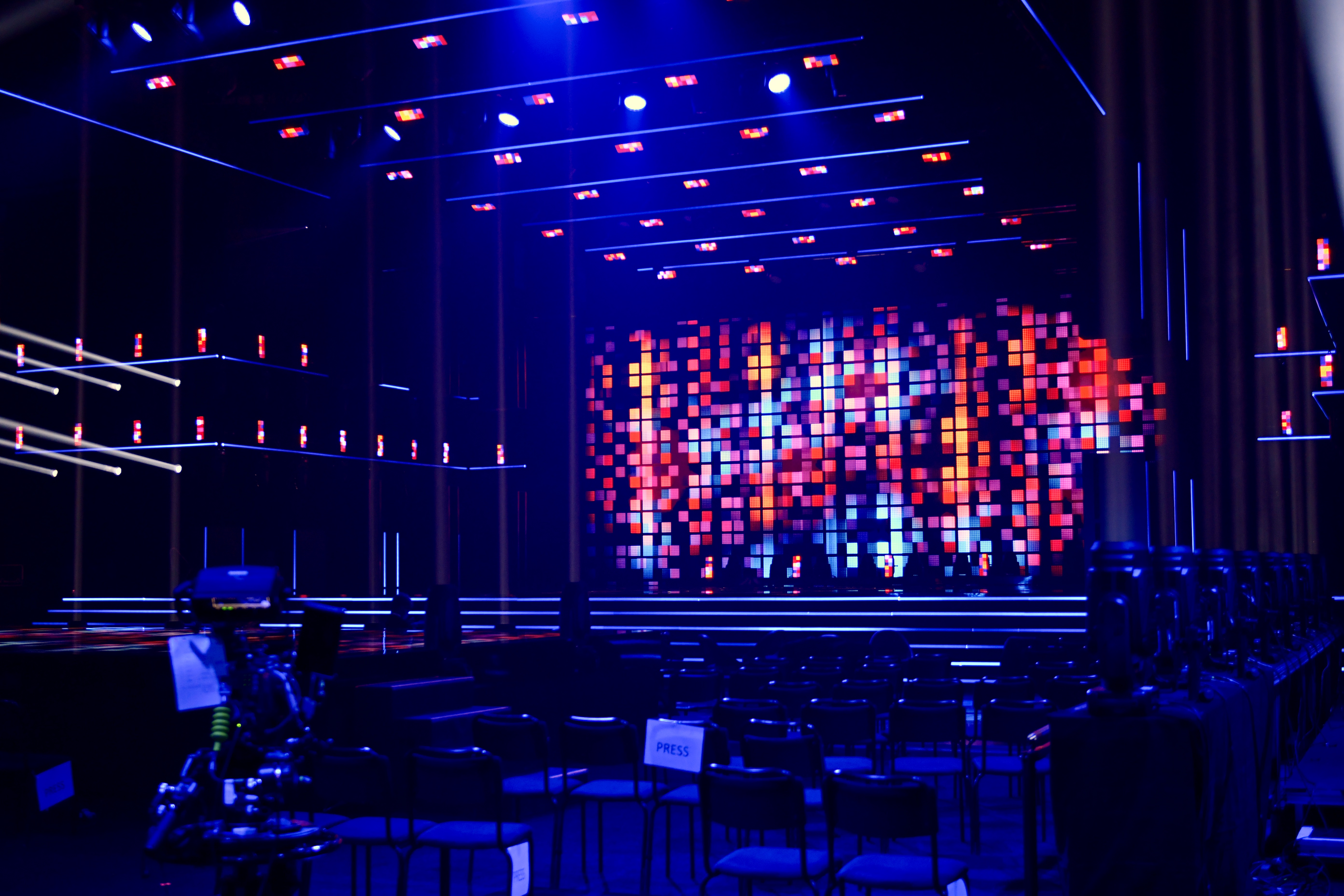
The stage of Melodifestivalen 2022, as seen during the first heat at the Avicii Arena.

The event was planned to return to its traditional tour around six cities of the country (namely Malmö, Gothenburg, Linköping, Lidköping, Örnsköldsvik and Stockholm) with venues available for spectators, after the previous edition was entirely held in one place and without an audience due to the COVID-19 pandemic. However, due to tightening restrictions in light of the spread of the Omicron variant, SVT announced on 14 January 2022 that all shows would instead be held in Stockholm. On 4 February, SVT announced that the first three heats would be held in the Avicii Arena, while the remaining one heat, the semi-finals and the final would be held in the Friends Arena.

As usual, a total of 28 entries took part in the competition, 12 of which made it to the final. For this edition, the wildcard spot given to one of the artists in the P4 Nästa competition organised by Sveriges Radio P4 was not used.

Proceeds from the voting in the fourth heat, semi-finals and final were donated to aid relief efforts during the Russian invasion of Ukraine.

Competition Schedule
Show	Date	City	Venue
Heat 1	5 February 2022	Stockholm	Avicii Arena
Heat 2	12 February 2022	Stockholm	Avicii Arena
Heat 3	19 February 2022	Stockholm	Avicii Arena
Heat 4	26 February 2022	Stockholm	Friends Arena
Semi-finals	5 March 2022	Stockholm	Friends Arena
Final	12 March 2022	Stockholm	Friends Arena

=== Format changes ===
New changes to the format were announced on 26 January 2022.

==== Heats ====
Two rounds of voting take place. The song with the most votes in the first round directly qualifies for the final, while in the second round, the remaining six songs are decided on largely as it was prior – the top-placed song qualify for the final, while the songs that placed second and third go to the semi-finals, using a system of age groups that has been in place since 2019. Each age group's vote carries a score of 12, 10, 8, 5, 3 and 1. For the first time, the full breakdown of the results, including points given out by each age group, is shown on screen. In contrast to previous editions, the two finalists do not reprise their songs at the end of the broadcast.

==== Semi-finals ====
The semi-finals show was introduced to replace the previously held Second Chance round. In a draw held on 1 March 2022, the third- and fourth-placed songs from each of the previous four heats (eight songs in total) are placed into two semi-finals. No differences are made on whether the entries placed third or fourth in their respective heats. The top two songs from each semi-final proceed to the final, using the age group system. Each age group's vote carries a score of 12, 10, 8, and 5. For the semi-finals, no full results breakdown is shown on screen.

==== Final ====
After the international jury groups have cast their votes, all viewers are provided with new votes, in order to continue to influence the results even after the international jury has had its say. The public voting results are determined using the age group system. Each age group's vote carries a score of 12, 10, 8–1.

=== Presenters ===
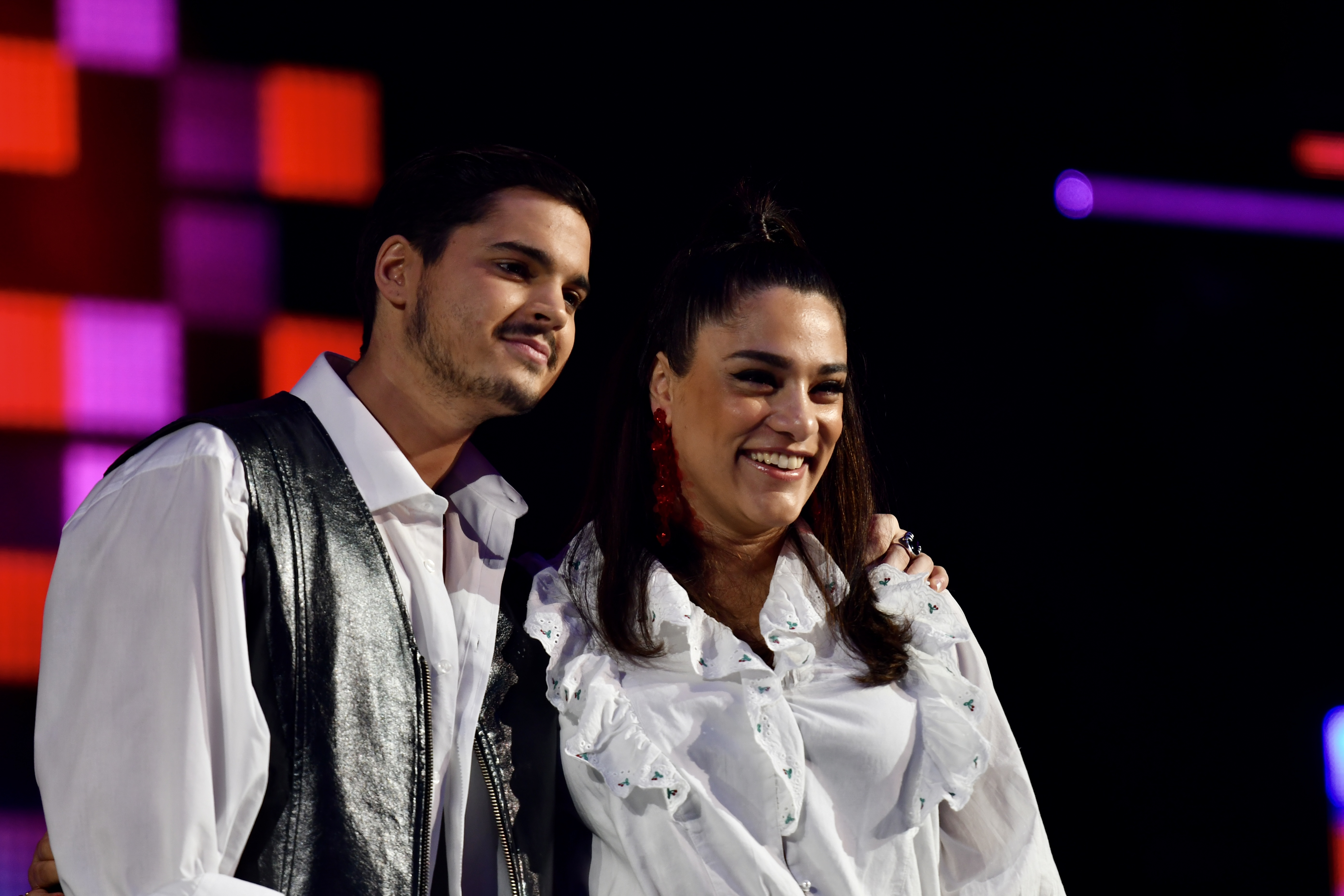
Oscar Zia, main presenter of Melodifestivalen 2022, and co-host Farah Abadi.

On 7 September 2021, Oscar Zia was revealed to return as the main presenter for the show in 2022, after hosting the second heat of Melodifestivalen 2021. Radio and television host Farah Abadi served as the artists' interviewer along the course of the competition and co-hosted the final. Guest co-hosts included Eva Rydberg (heat 2) and Johanna Nordström (heat 3). For the final, a commentary in English was provided by Olivia Le Poidevin and Bella Qvist on a separate stream on SVT Play.

== Competing entries ==
On 27 August 2021, SVT opened a public submission window (with the deadline on 17 September 2021) to select one half of the contestants, the other half being made up of artists specially invited by the broadcaster. Upon closing the submission period, SVT announced that over 2,500 applications had been received, to be reviewed by a professional jury chaired by producer Karin Gunnarsson.

The first half of contestants were officially announced by SVT on 26 November 2021, while the second half was revealed on the following 1 December. Several participants had previously competed at Melodifestivalen: Cornelia Jakobs (2011 and 2012, as part of Love Generation), Alvaro Estrella (2014, 2020 and 2021), Robin Bengtsson (2016, 2020, and winner in 2017), Lisa Ajax (2016, 2017, and 2019), Omar Rudberg (2017, as part of FO&O, and solo in 2019), Liamoo (2018 and 2019), John Lundvik (2018 and winner in 2019), Malou Prytz (2019 and 2020), Anna Bergendahl (2019, 2020, and winner in 2010), Faith Kakembo (2020), Klara Hammarström (2020 and 2021), band Lillasyster (2021), Sami Rekik, member of Medina (2021, with WAHL), Danne Stråhed (1992, as part of Wizex) and veterans Linda Bengtzing (2005, 2006, 2008, 2011, 2014, 2016 and 2020) and Shirley Clamp (2003, 2004, 2005, 2009, 2011 and 2014).

Artist	Song	Songwriter(s)
Alvaro Estrella	"Suave"	Linnea Deb, Jimmy "Joker" Thörnfeldt, Joy Deb, Alvaro Estrella
Anders Bagge	"Bigger than the Universe"	Anders Bagge, Jimmy Jansson, Peter Boström, Thomas G:son
Angelino	"The End"	Angelino Markenhorn, Julie Aagaard, Melanie Wehbe, Thomas Stengaard
Anna Bergendahl	"Higher Power"	Anna Bergendahl, Thomas G:son, Bobby Ljunggren, Erik Bernholm
Browsing Collection	"Face in the Crowd"	Carolina Karlsson, Mimi Brander, Moa Lenngren, Nora Lenngren, Sandra Bjurman, Jimmy Wahlsteen
Cazzi Opeia	"I Can't Get Enough"	Bishat Araya, Jakob Redtzer, Cazzi Opeia, Paul Rey
Cornelia Jakobs	"Hold Me Closer"	Isa Molin, David Zandén, Cornelia Jakobsdotter
Danne Stråhed	"Hallabaloo"	Danne Stråhed, Fredrik Andersson, Erik Stenhammar
Faith Kakembo	"Freedom"	Laurell Barker, Anderz Wrethov, Palle Hammarlund, Faith Kakembo
John Lundvik	"Änglavakt"	Anderz Wrethov, Elin Wrethov, Benjamin Rosenbohm, Fredrik Sonefors, John Lundvik
Klara Hammarström	"Run to the Hills"	Jimmy "Joker" Thörnfeldt, Julie Aagaard, Anderz Wrethov, Klara Hammarström
Lancelot	"Lyckligt slut"	Lance Hedman, Niklas Carson Mattsson
Liamoo	"Bluffin"	Jimmy "Joker" Thörnfeldt, Sami Rekik, Dino Medanhodzic, Ali Jammali
Lillasyster	"Till Our Days Are Over"	Jimmy Jansson, Palle Hammarlund, Ian-Paolo Lira, Martin Westerstrand
Linda Bengtzing	"Fyrfaldigt hurra!"	Thomas G:son, Linda Bengtzing, Myra Granberg, Daniel Jelldéus
Lisa Miskovsky	"Best to Come"	Lisa Miskovsky, David Lindgren Zacharias
Malin Christin	"Synd om dig"	Jonathan Lavotha, Oliver Heinänen, Malin Christin
Malou Prytz	"Bananas"	Alice Gernandt, Jimmy "Joker" Thörnfeldt, Joy Deb, Linnea Deb
Medina	"In i dimman"	Jimmy "Joker" Thörnfeldt, Sami Rekik, Dino Medanhodzic, Ali Jammali
Niello & Lisa Ajax	"Tror du att jag bryr mig"	Yvonne Dahlbom, Niklas Grahn Linroth, Jesper Welander
Omar Rudberg	"Moving Like That"	Omar Rudberg, Gustav Blomberg, Amanda Kongshaug, Kristin Marie
Robin Bengtsson	"Innocent Love"	David Lindgren Zacharias, Victor Sjöström, Victor Crone, Viktor Broberg, Sebastian Atas
Samira Manners	"I Want to Be Loved"	Samira Manners, Fredrik Andersson
Shirley Clamp	"Let There Be Angels"	Mats Tärnfors, Pelle Nylén, Shirley Clamp, Jakob Skarin
Tenori	"La stella"	Dan Sundquist, Kristian Lagerström, Marcos Ubeda, Bobby Ljunggren, Sarah Börjesson Wassberg
Theoz	"Som du vill"	Tobias Lundgren, Axel Schylström, Tim Larsson, Elize Ryd, Jimmy "Joker" Thörnfeldt
Tone Sekelius	"My Way"	Anderz Wrethov, Tone Sekelius
Tribe Friday	"Shut Me Up"	Isak Gunnarsson, Robin Hanberger Pérez, Noah Deutschmann

== Heats ==
=== Heat 1 ===
The first heat took place on 5 February 2022 in the Avicii Arena, Stockholm. 3,135,000 viewers watched the heat live. A total of 207,996 votes were cast, using 92,275 devices. Due to a technical fault, app voting did not work during this heat and only telephone voting was counted.

R/O	Artist	Song	Round 1		Round 2		Result
R/O	Artist	Song	Votes	Place	Votes	Place	Result
1	Malou Prytz	"Bananas"	11,666	7	4,407	6	Out
2	Theoz	"Som du vill"	18,593	4	7,119	3	Semi-final
3	Shirley Clamp	"Let There Be Angels"	12,290	6	4,606	5	Out
4	Omar Rudberg	"Moving Like That"	15,034	5	6,143	4	Out
5	Danne Stråhed	"Hallabaloo"	22,611	3	7,827	2	Semi-final
6	Cornelia Jakobs	"Hold Me Closer"	57,790	1	—N/a		Final
7	Robin Bengtsson	"Innocent Love"	27,167	2	12,743	1	Final

=== Heat 2 ===
The second heat took place on 12 February 2022 in the Avicii Arena, Stockholm. 2,845,000 viewers watched the heat live. A total of 10,514,804 votes were cast (which is a record for a heat), using 541,541 devices.

R/O	Artist	Song	Round 1		Round 2			Result
R/O	Artist	Song	Votes	Place	Votes	Points	Place	Result
1	Liamoo	"Bluffin"	1,251,962	1	—			Final
2	Niello and Lisa Ajax	"Tror du att jag bryr mig"	729,173	7	394,603	21	6	Out
3	Samira Manners	"I Want to Be Loved"	918,801	6	483,416	35	4	Out
4	Alvaro Estrella	"Suave"	1,101,316	3	632,112	69	2	Semi-final
5	Browsing Collection	"Face in the Crowd"	934,656	5	488,204	33	5	Out
6	John Lundvik	"Änglavakt"	1,203,899	2	778,736	92	1	Final
7	Tone Sekelius	"My Way"	946,861	4	671,065	62	3	Semi-final

Round 2 detailed televoting results
R/O	Song	Age groups							Tel.
R/O	Song	3‍–‍9	10‍–‍15	16‍–‍29	30‍–‍44	45‍–‍59	60‍–‍74	75+	Tel.
2	"Tror du att jag bryr mig"	10	5	1	1	1	1	1	1
3	"I Want to Be Loved"	3	3	3	3	5	5	5	8
4	"Suave"	12	10	8	10	10	8	8	3
5	"Face in the Crowd"	5	1	5	8	3	3	3	5
6	"Änglavakt"	8	12	12	12	12	12	12	12
7	"My Way"	1	8	10	5	8	10	10	10

=== Heat 3 ===
The third heat took place on 19 February 2022 in the Avicii Arena, Stockholm. 2,958,000 viewers watched the heat live. A total of 9,485,644 votes were cast, using 556,791 devices.

R/O	Artist	Song	Round 1		Round 2			Result
R/O	Artist	Song	Votes	Place	Votes	Points	Place	Result
1	Cazzi Opeia	"I Can't Get Enough"	814,904	4	496,428	67	3	Semi-final
2	Lancelot	"Lyckligt slut"	701,151	6	388,513	35	5	Out
3	Lisa Miskovsky	"Best to Come"	885,647	3	551,025	75	2	Semi-final
4	Tribe Friday	"Shut Me Up"	665,176	7	368,861	19	6	Out
5	Faith Kakembo	"Freedom"	1,076,213	2	685,512	79	1	Final
6	Linda Bengtzing	"Fyrfaldigt hurra!"	729,974	5	404,576	37	4	Out
7	Anders Bagge	"Bigger than the Universe"	1,717,664	1	—			Final

Round 2 detailed televoting results
R/O	Song	Age groups							Tel.
R/O	Song	3‍–‍9	10‍–‍15	16‍–‍29	30‍–‍44	45‍–‍59	60‍–‍74	75+	Tel.
1	"I Can't Get Enough"	12	10	5	8	8	8	8	8
2	"Lyckligt slut"	5	5	8	3	3	3	3	5
3	"Best to Come"	8	8	1	10	12	12	12	12
4	"Shut Me Up"	1	1	10	1	1	1	1	3
5	"Freedom"	3	12	12	12	10	10	10	10
6	"Fyrfaldigt hurra"	10	3	3	5	5	5	5	1

=== Heat 4 ===
The fourth heat took place on 26 February 2022 in the Friends Arena, Stockholm. This heat was originally going to take place at Avicii Arena, but had to be moved because the arena was already booked for a concert by singer Tomas Ledin. 2,778,000 viewers watched the heat live. A total of 8,423,843 votes were cast, using 534,683 devices.

R/O	Artist	Song	Round 1		Round 2			Result
R/O	Artist	Song	Votes	Place	Votes	Points	Place	Result
1	Anna Bergendahl	"Higher Power"	878,089	4	519,678	73	2	Semi-final
2	Lillasyster	"Till Our Days Are Over"	921,658	3	560,382	65	3	Semi-final
3	Malin Christin	"Synd om dig"	520,201	6	217,215	16	6	Out
4	Tenori	"La stella"	508,062	7	259,361	37	5	Out
5	Medina	"In i dimman"	1,071,508	2	736,280	84	1	Final
6	Angelino	"The End"	679,799	5	367,428	37	4	Out
7	Klara Hammarström	"Run to the Hills"	1,184,182	1	—			Final

Round 2 detailed televoting results
R/O	Song	Age groups							Tel.
R/O	Song	3‍–‍9	10‍–‍15	16‍–‍29	30‍–‍44	45‍–‍59	60‍–‍74	75+	Tel.
1	"Higher Power"	8	8	5	8	8	12	12	12
2	"Till Our Days Are Over"	10	10	10	10	12	5	3	5
3	"Synd om dig"	5	3	1	3	1	1	1	1
4	"La stella"	1	1	3	1	3	10	10	8
5	"In i dimman"	12	12	12	12	10	8	8	10
6	"The End"	3	5	8	5	5	3	5	3

== Semi-finals ==
The semi-finals took place as part of one show on 5 March 2022 in the Friends Arena, Stockholm. 2,540,000 viewers watched the show live. A total of 6,415,609 votes were cast, using 584,876 devices.

=== Semi-final 1 ===
R/O	Artist	Song	Votes		Place	Result
R/O	Artist	Song	Votes	Points	Place	Result
1	Tone Sekelius	"My Way"	1,185,407	86	1	Final
2	Alvaro Estrella	"Suave"	1,045,540	71	3	Out
3	Danne Stråhed	"Hallabaloo"	640,928	46	4	Out
4	Anna Bergendahl	"Higher Power"	863,838	77	2	Final

Detailed televoting results
R/O	Song	Age groups							Tel.
R/O	Song	3‍–‍9	10‍–‍15	16‍–‍29	30‍–‍44	45‍–‍59	60‍–‍74	75+	Tel.
1	"My Way"	10	12	12	12	10	10	10	10
2	"Suave"	12	10	10	10	8	8	8	5
3	"Hallabaloo"	8	5	5	5	5	5	5	8
4	"Higher Power"	5	8	8	8	12	12	12	12

=== Semi-final 2 ===
R/O	Artist	Song	Votes		Place	Result
R/O	Artist	Song	Votes	Points	Place	Result
5	Theoz	"Som du vill"	968,353	71	2	Final
6	Lisa Miskovsky	"Best to Come"	898,141	68	3	Out
7	Lillasyster	"Till Our Days Are Over"	813,402	65	4	Out
8	Cazzi Opeia	"I Can't Get Enough"	844,189	76	1	Final

Detailed televoting results
R/O	Song	Age groups							Tel.
R/O	Song	3‍–‍9	10‍–‍15	16‍–‍29	30‍–‍44	45‍–‍59	60‍–‍74	75+	Tel.
5	"Som du vill"	12	12	12	12	5	5	8	5
6	"Best to Come"	5	5	5	5	12	12	12	12
7	"Till Our Days Are Over"	8	8	10	10	8	8	5	8
8	"I Can't Get Enough"	10	10	8	8	10	10	10	10

== Final ==
The final took place on 12 March 2022 in the Friends Arena, Stockholm, where Cornelia Jakobs won with her song "Hold Me Closer". 3,289,000 viewers watched the final live. A record-breaking total of 22,447,671 votes were cast, using 1,088,043 devices.

R/O	Artist	Song	Juries	Public	Total	Place
1	Klara Hammarström	"Run to the Hills"	27	56	83	6
2	Theoz	"Som du vill"	39	26	65	7
3	Anna Bergendahl	"Higher Power"	11	18	29	12
4	John Lundvik	"Änglavakt"	43	17	60	8
5	Tone Sekelius	"My Way"	31	53	84	5
6	Anders Bagge	"Bigger than the Universe"	31	90	121	2
7	Robin Bengtsson	"Innocent Love"	29	5	34	11
8	Faith Kakembo	"Freedom"	33	18	51	10
9	Liamoo	"Bluffin"	65	26	91	4
10	Cornelia Jakobs	"Hold Me Closer"	76	70	146	1
11	Cazzi Opeia	"I Can't Get Enough"	26	29	55	9
12	Medina	"In i dimman"	53	56	109	3

Detailed international jury votes
R/O	Song	Netherlands	Finland	Spain	Australia	Czech Republic	Ireland	Israel	Italy	Total
R/O	Song	Netherlands	Finland	Spain	Australia	Czech Republic	Ireland	Israel	Italy	Total
1	"Run to the Hills"		2	5	3	5	3	3	6	27
2	"Som du vill"	5	7	2	1	12	5	7		39
3	"Higher Power"			10					1	11
4	"Änglavakt"	6	12	4	7	6		5	3	43
5	"My Way"	4	6	1	2	4	6	4	4	31
6	"Bigger than the Universe"	2		6	4	10	2		7	31
7	"Innocent Love"	1	1	3		8	10	6		29
8	"Freedom"	7	5		8	2	7	2	2	33
9	"Bluffin"	8	8	7	5	7	12	8	10	65
10	"Hold Me Closer"	10	10	12	12		8	12	12	76
11	"I Can't Get Enough"	3	3		6	1	4	1	8	26
12	"In i dimman"	12	4	8	10	3	1	10	5	53
International jury spokespersons
Netherlands – Lars Lourenco; Finland – Sophia Wekesa; Spain – Eva Mora; Australia – Paul Clarke; Czech Republic – Filip Vlček; Ireland – Neil Doherty; Israel – Tali Eshkoli; Italy – Marta Cagnola

Detailed televoting results
R/O	Song	Votes	Age groups							Tel.	Total
R/O	Song	Votes	3‍–‍9	10‍–‍15	16‍–‍29	30‍–‍44	45‍–‍59	60‍–‍74	75+	Tel.	Total
1	"Run to the Hills"	2,409,631	10	10	6	8	8	4	5	5	56
2	"Som du vill"	1,594,285	12	5	4	4				1	26
3	"Higher Power"	1,056,035					1	7	8	2	18
4	"Änglavakt"	1,324,091	2	2	2	2	3	2	4		17
5	"My Way"	2,113,374	6	8	7	6	5	8	6	7	53
6	"Bigger than the Universe"	3,464,137	8	12	10	12	12	12	12	12	90
7	"Innocent Love"	1,157,117	4			1					5
8	"Freedom"	1,268,069		4	3		2	3	3	3	18
9	"Bluffin"	1,506,098	5	3	5	3	4	1	1	4	26
10	"Hold Me Closer"	2,937,401	1	7	12	10	10	10	10	10	70
11	"I Can't Get Enough"	1,488,320	3	1	1	5	6	5	2	6	29
12	"In i dimman"	2,129,113	7	6	8	7	7	6	7	8	56

== Ratings ==
Viewing figures by show
Show	Air date	Viewers (millions)	Share (%)
Heat 1	5 February 2022	3.135	75.7%
Heat 2	12 February 2022	2.845	74.6%
Heat 3	19 February 2022	2.958	75%
Heat 4	26 February 2022	2.778	73.2%
Semi-finals	5 March 2022	2.540	72.5%
Final	12 March 2022	3.289	75.7%
