= Mer av dig =

Single by Theoz

from the album Mer av dig
- Released: 11 February 2023
- Length: 2:44
- Label: Giant
- Songwriter(s): Axel Schylström; Jakob Redtzer; Peter Boström; Thomas G:son

Theoz singles chronology
| "Julmusiken" (2022) | "Mer av dig" (2023) |

"Mer av dig" is a song by Swedish singer Theoz, released as a single on 11 February 2023. It was performed in Melodifestivalen 2023.

== Charts ==
=== Weekly charts ===
Weekly chart performance for "Mer av dig"
| Chart (2023) | Peak position |
|---|---|
| Sweden (Sverigetopplistan) | 5 |

=== Year-end charts ===
Year-end chart performance for "Mer av dig"
| Chart (2023) | Position |
|---|---|
| Sweden (Sverigetopplistan) | 33 |
