= Masquerade (Swedish band) =

Swedish rock band

- Origin: Skövde, Sweden
- Genres: Rock, hard rock, heavy metal, power metal, neo-classical metal
- Years active: 1988–present
- Labels: Metal Blade
- Members: Tony Johansson – vocals; Thomas G:son – guitars; Marco Tapani – drums; Henrik Lundberg – bass

Masquerade are a Swedish rock band established in 1988. They released their debut album in 1992 and have since released four further albums.

== History ==
During their first two years, the band concentrated on writing music, rehearsing and performing live. In 1990, Masquerade recorded a promotional cassette and a single that was favorably reviewed in the English magazine Metal Hammer. After signing on with Empire Records, in early 1991 the band started recording their self-titled album. The record company brought the engineer Ronny Lahti (Saigon Kick, Europe, Talisman, Electric Boys, Clockwise) into the project for finalizing the mixing. The album was released in 1992 to positive reviews by critics, who found the album comparable to the music of bands like Whitesnake and Def Leppard.

After their first album tour, the band developed new material and began recording their new album Surface of Pain, again together with Ronny Lahti as the sound and mixing engineer. Released in 1995, the album was characterized by a heavier approach than the debut album and gained the band exposure to an American audience.

The band then worked together on the third album, Flux, with Fredrik Nordström, who had achieved success with the band HammerFall.

In Disguise was released in 2004 and issued in Japan in 2005 on Spiritual Best Records.

== Records ==
- Masquerade (1992)
- Surface of Pain (1994), Metal Blade
- Flux (2001), Metal Blade
- In Disguise (2005), Vivid Sound
