= Rhythm of My Show =

Single by Tone Sekelius
- Released: 25 February 2023
- Length: 2:46
- Label: Emperial; Giant
- Songwriter(s): Anderz Wrethov; Dino Medanhodzic; Jimmy "Joker" Thörnfeldt; Tone Sekelius

Tone Sekelius singles chronology
"Crying on Christmas" (2022)	"Rhythm of My Show" (2023)

"Rhythm of My Show" is a song by Swedish singer Tone Sekelius, released as a single on 25 February 2023. It was performed in Melodifestivalen 2023.

== Track listing ==
Digital single
No.	Title	Length
1.	"Rhythm of My Show"	2:45
2.	"My Way"	3:02
3.	"What a Shame"	2:27
Total length:		8:14

== Charts ==
Chart performance for "Rhythm of My Show"
Chart (2023)	Peak position
Sweden (Sverigetopplistan)	19
