= Isa Molin =

Swedish songwriter

- Born: 1992 (age 33–34)
- Occupations: singer and songwriter
- Awards: Rockbjörnen; musikförläggarnas pris

Isabelle "Isa" Ljunggren Molin (born 1992) is a Swedish singer and songwriter.

Her father is Bobby Ljunggren. She has collaborated with songwriters all over the world and has created a song collection, securing cuts by Steps, Clara Klingenström, Anna Bergendahl, Jill Johnson, Doug Seegers, Robin Stjernberg, Klara Hammarström, among others.

Molin participated in Melodifestivalen 2019 with the song "Torn", performed by Lisa Ajax, which was the only entry in the selection composed by a single songwriter. The song finished in ninth place in the final.

In 2022, Molin participated in Melodifestivalen again with the song "Hold Me Closer", performed by Cornelia Jakobs, which she co-wrote with Jakobs and David Zandén. The song won the selection and thus represented Sweden in the Eurovision Song Contest 2022 in Turin and finished in fourth place with 438 points. "Hold Me Closer" won song of the year in the Swedish music prize Rockbjörnen, and song of the year in musikförläggarnas pris. The song was also nominated for the Swedish music prize Grammis as the song of the year. Isa Molin received the 2022 Marcel Bezençon Composer Award together with David Zandén and Cornelia Jakobs.
