= Higher Power (disambiguation) =

"Higher Power" is a term used in the Alcoholics Anonymous and other twelve-step programs.

Higher Power may also refer to:

== Music ==
- Higher Power (band), a British hardcore punk band
- Higher Power (Big Audio Dynamite album), 1994
- Higher Power (The Dirty Nil album), 2016
- "Higher Power" (Coldplay song), 2021
- "Higher Power" (Anna Bergendahl song), 2022
- "Higher Power", a song by Boston from Greatest Hits, 1997

== Other uses ==
- Higher Power (film), a 2018 American science fiction film
- "Higher Power" (seaQuest DSV), a television episode
- "A Higher Power" (Criminal Minds), a television episode
- Higher Power, a wrestling name used in the WWE by Vince McMahon

== See also ==
- Deity
- God
- Conceptions of God
- Exponentiation, the use of lower and higher "powers" in mathematics
