= Browsing Collection =

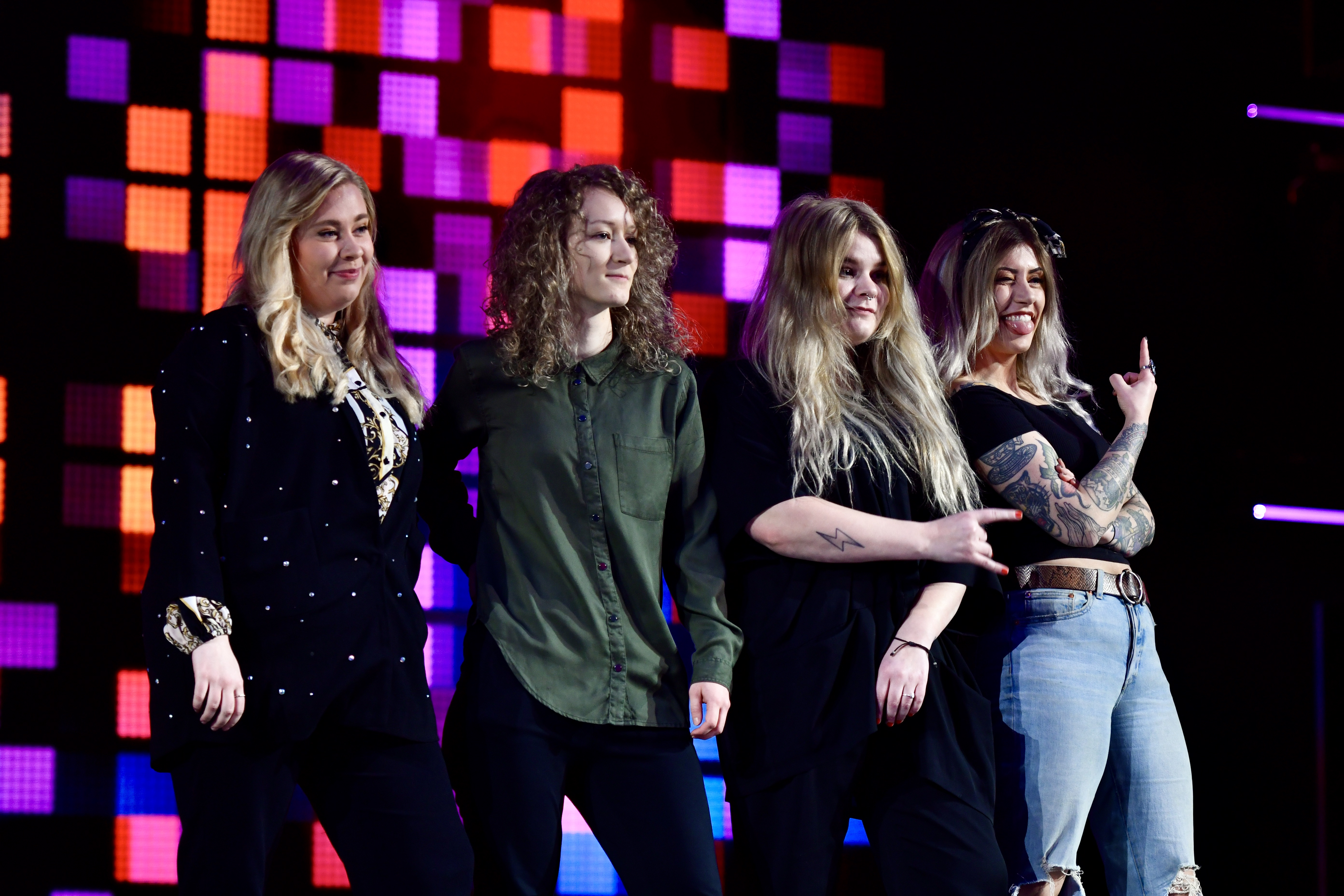
Browsing Collection in 2022

Browsing Collection is a Swedish rock group. They participated in Melodifestivalen 2022 with the song "Face in the Crowd". They performed in Heat 2 on 12 February 2022, finishing in fifth place and failing to qualify. They also played at the Sweden Rock Festival in 2015 and 2022.

The band has since 2015 the following members: Carro Karlsson (Drums), Mimi Brander (Vocals, Rhythm Guitar), Moa Lenngren (Lead Guitar, Vocals), Nora Lenngren (Bass, Vocals)

== Discography ==
=== Singles ===
List of singles with selected chart positions
| Title | Year | Peak chart positions | Album |
| Title | Year | SWE Heat. | Album |
|---|---|---|---|
| "Face in the Crowd" | 2022 | 7 | Non-album single |
