= I Can't Get Enough (Cazzi Opeia song) =

Single by Cazzi Opeia
- Released: 19 February 2022
- Length: 2:48
- Label: Ekko
- Songwriters: Bishat Araya; Jakob Redtzer; Cazzi Opeia; Paul Rey
- Producer: Jakob Redtzer

Cazzi Opeia singles chronology
"Rich" (2018)	"I Can't Get Enough" (2022)	"Taste of Heaven" (2023)

"I Can't Get Enough" is a song by Swedish singer Cazzi Opeia, released as a single on 19 February 2022. It was performed in Melodifestivalen 2022 and qualified to the final on 12 March 2022.

== Melodifestivalen 2022 ==
"I Can't Get Enough" was performed in Heat 3 on 19 February 2022. She garnered 63 points and qualified to the semi-final. She later qualified to the final on 12 March 2022, where she placed 9th with 55 points.

== Charts ==
=== Weekly charts ===
Weekly chart performance for "I Can't Get Enough"
Chart (2022)	Peak position
Sweden (Sverigetopplistan)	5

=== Year-end charts ===
Year-end chart performance for "I Can't Get Enough"
Chart (2022)	Position
Sweden (Sverigetopplistan)	80

== Certifications ==
Certifications for "I Can't Get Enough"
Region	Certification	Certified units/sales
Streaming
Sweden (GLF)	Platinum	8,000,000^{†}
^{†} Streaming-only figures based on certification alone.
