= Run to the Hills (Klara Hammarström song) =

Single by Klara Hammarström
- Released: 26 February 2022
- Length: 2:55
- Label: Giant
- Songwriters: Anderz Wrethov; Jimmy Thörnfeldt; Julie Aagaard; Klara Hammarström

Klara Hammarström singles chronology
"Guld, svett & tårar" (2022)	"Run to the Hills" (2022)	"Bang My Head" (2022)

"Run to the Hills" is a song by Swedish singer Klara Hammarström, released as a single on 26 February 2022. It was performed in Melodifestivalen 2022 and made it to the final on 12 March 2022. It reached number one in Sweden on 11 March 2022.

Hammarström performing "Run to the Hills"

== Track listing ==
Digital single
No.	Title	Length
1.	"Run to the Hills"	2:55
2.	"Beat of Broken Hearts"	3:02

== Charts ==
=== Weekly charts ===
Weekly chart performance for "Run to the Hills"
Chart (2022)	Peak position
Sweden (Sverigetopplistan)	1

=== Year-end charts ===
Year-end chart performance for "Run to the Hills"
Chart (2022)	Position
Sweden (Sverigetopplistan)	21
