= Faith Kakembo =

Swedish singer (born 1985)

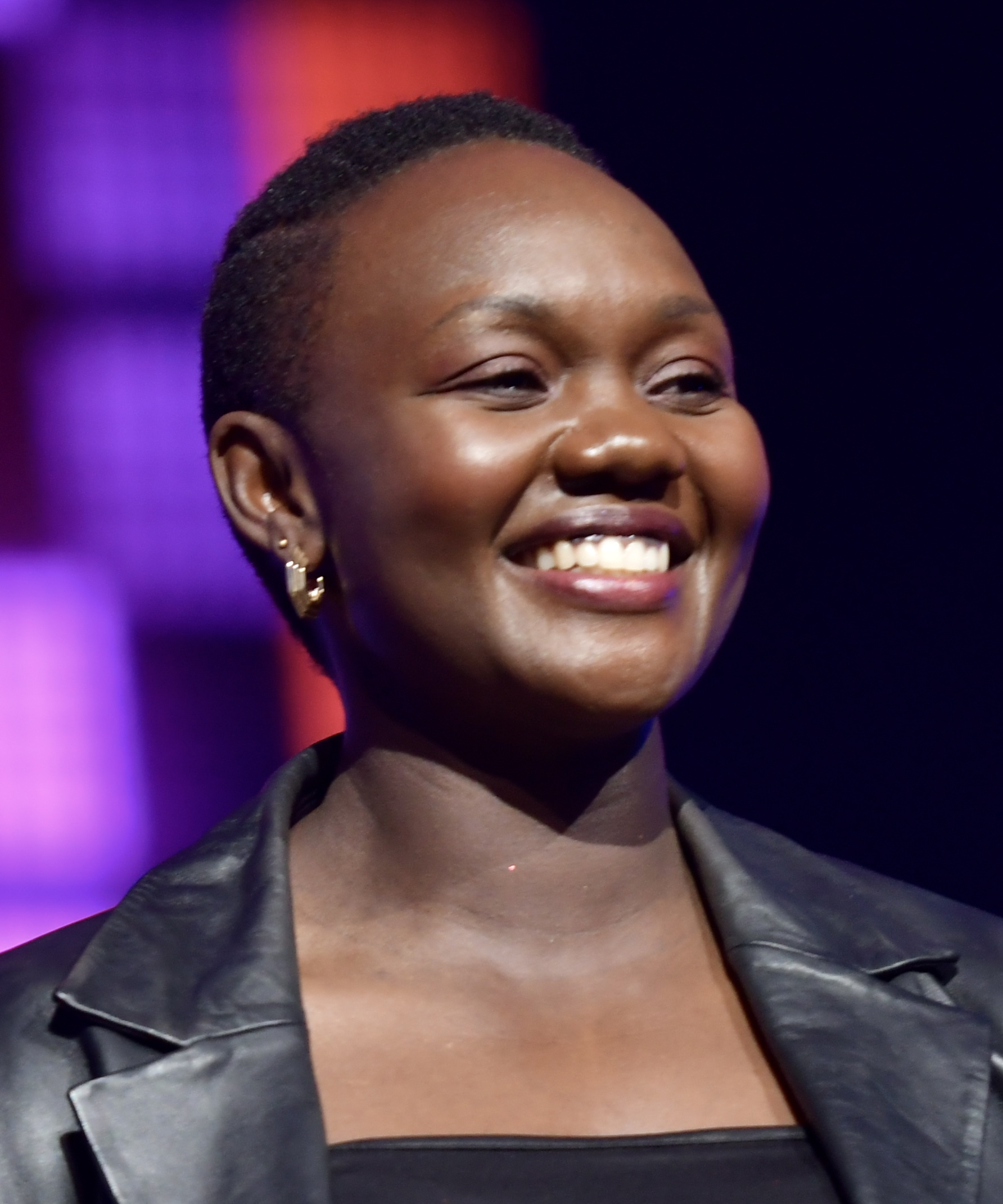
- Kakembo in 2022

Background information
- Birth name: Elna Faith Kakembo Wilén
- Born: 16 April 1985 (age 40); Kampala, Uganda
- Genres: Gospel; soul
- Occupations: Singer; nurse anesthetist
- Years active: 2019–present
- Labels: Warner Music Sweden; Loud Noise

Elna Faith Kakembo Wilén (born 16 April 1985) is a Swedish-Ugandan singer and nurse anesthetist.

== Biography ==
Elna Faith Kakembo Wilén was born on 16 April 1985 in Kampala, Uganda. She was raised in Månsarp in Småland.

Kakembo started her musical career in a church choir when she was a teenager. She studied music at a folk high school for a year.

In 2019, Kakembo participated in music competition held by Sveriges Radio, P4 Nästa, with the song "Through Fire and Rain". In 2020, she participated in Melodifestivalen 2020 with the song "Crying Rivers", written by Swedish producer Jörgen Elofsson and Canadian songwriter Liz Rodrigues, where she placed fifth in the third semi-final.

In 2022, Kakembo participated in Melodifestivalen 2022 with the song "Freedom", co-written with Laurell Barker, Anderz Wrethov, and Palle Hammarlund. She qualified for the final and performed again on 12 March, finishing in 10th place with 51 points.

== Discography ==
=== Singles ===
Title	Year	Peak chart positions	Album
Title	Year	SWE	Album
"Through Fire and Rain"	2019	—	Non-album singles
"Crying Rivers"	2020	— (Note: "Crying Rivers" did not enter the Swedish Singellista Chart, but peaked at number 18 on the Swedish Heatseeker Chart.)	Non-album singles
"O Come, All Ye Faithful"	2021	—	Non-album singles
"Freedom"	2022	15	Non-album singles
