= Änglavakt =

Single by John Lundvik
- Released: 26 February 2022
- Length: 3:03
- Label: Warner Music Sweden
- Songwriters: Anderz Wrethov; Benjamin Rosenbohm; Elin Wrethov; Freedrik Sonefors

John Lundvik singles chronology
"Smålandssången" (2022)	"Änglavakt" (2022)	"Lights Go Low" (2022)

"Änglavakt" (Swedish pronunciation: [ˈɛ̂ŋːlaˌvakt]) (Note: May be translated to "guardian angel", but is only used in the idiom ha änglavakt, meaning "to have angels guard you", "to have luck", "to be spared" and such.) is a Swedish-language song by Swedish singer John Lundvik, released as a single on 26 February 2022. It was performed in Melodifestivalen 2022 and made it to the final on 12 March 2022.

== Charts ==
Chart performance for "Änglavakt"
Chart (2022)	Peak position
Sweden (Sverigetopplistan)	11
