= Kadiatou =

Kadiatou or Kadiatu is a female given name. It may refer to:

== People ==
Given name

- Kadiatou Camara (born 1981), Malian sprinter
- Kadiatou Doumbia (born 1994), Malian footballer
- Kadiatou Kanouté (born 1978), Malian women's basketball player
- Kadiatou Konaté, Malian film director and screenwriter.
- Kadiatou Holm Keita, (born 2001), Swedish singer known by the mononym Kadiatou.
- Kadiatou Touré (born 1983), Malian women's basketball player

Middle name

- Sy Kadiatou Sow (born 1955), Malian politician and minister

== See also ==
- Kadiatu Sesay or Kadi Sesay (born 1949), Sierra Leonean politician, feminist, pro-democracy advocate and the vice presidential candidate
- Kadiatu Lethbridge-Stewart, a fictional character from the Virgin New Adventures range of spin-offs based on the BBC science fiction television series Doctor Who
