= Tribe Friday =

Swedish indie rock band

Tribe Friday is a Swedish indie rock band. In 2021, the band was nominated for band of the year at the award show P3 Guld, which was broadcast on SVT.

The band in 2019 toured Europe and the US, along with Mando Diao.

Tribe Friday participated in Melodifestivalen 2022, with the song "Shut Me Up".

== Discography ==
=== Singles ===
Title	Year	Peak chart positions	Album
Title	Year	SWE Heat.	Album
"Shut Me Up"	2022	6	Bubblegum Emo
