= Karin Gunnarsson =

Swedish television producer and music editor

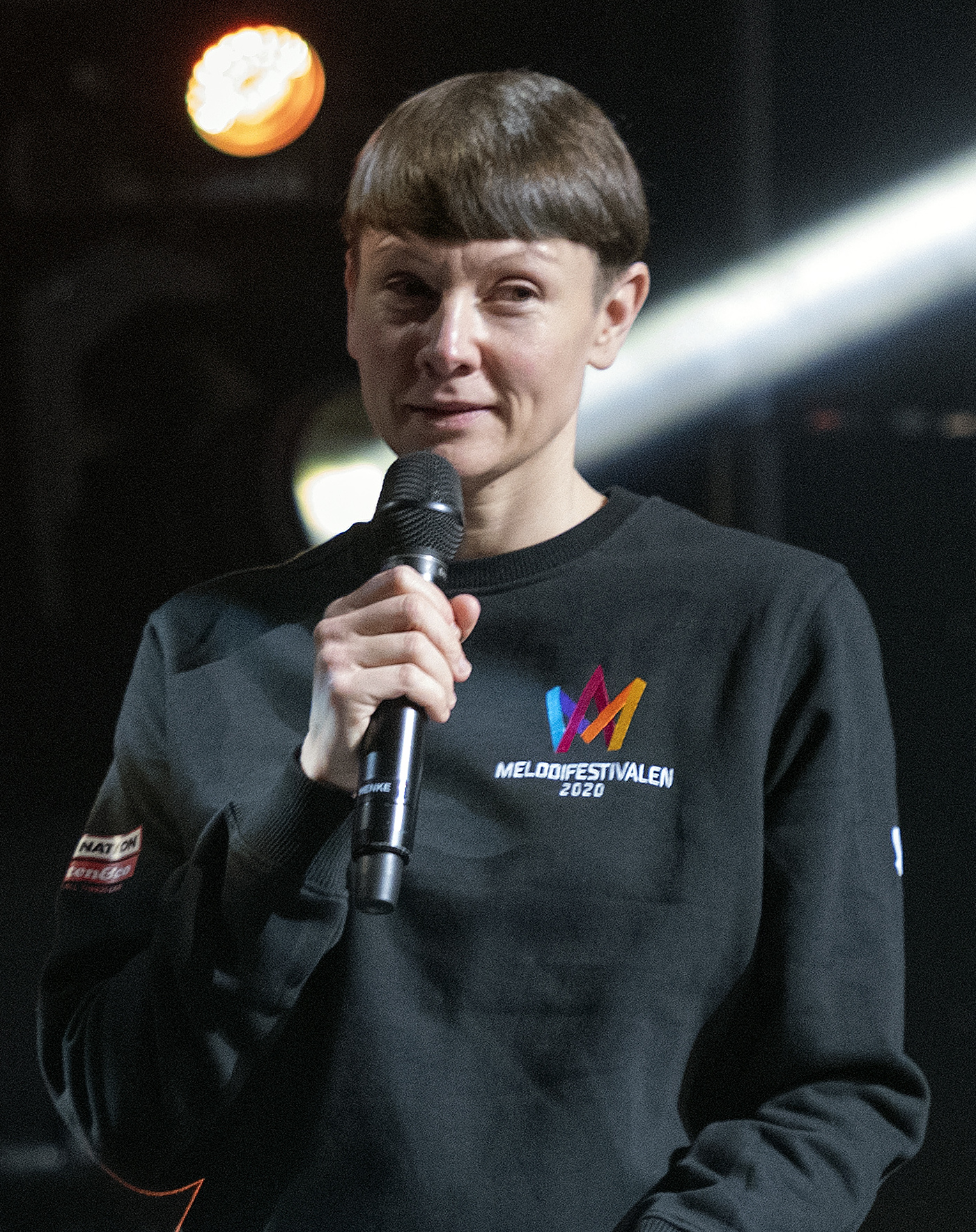
- Karin Gunnarsson at a press conference during Melodifestivalen 2020 in Linköping.
- Born: September 29, 1976 (age 49); Vetlanda, Sweden
- Occupations: Television producer, music editor

Karin Sofia Gunnarsson (born 29 September 1976) is a Swedish television producer and music editor. Since 2020, she has been the competition producer and artistic director of Melodifestivalen.

Gunnarsson grew up in Vetlanda and studied media at the University of Skövde. While in Skövde, she began working at P4 Skaraborg, which led to a temporary position at Sveriges Radio P3 in Stockholm. She spent several years as the station's music programmer and also worked in television, contributing to live broadcasts of the P3 Gold Awards and Musikhjälpen. At P3, she also served as a coordinator and artist booker. Gunnarsson has also worked as a product manager at a record label. Between 2013 and 2015, she was a member of the selection jury for Melodifestivalen, and in 2017, she became the show's deputy competition producer. In connection with Melodifestivalen 2020, she succeeded Christer Björkman as competition producer.

Together with Germund Stenhag and Linda Nordeman, she was ranked eighth on Metro's list of the 50 most powerful figures in Swedish entertainment in 2013. The trio was also named the most powerful in the music industry by Nöjesguiden the same year.
