= Danne Stråhed =

Swedish singer and songwriter

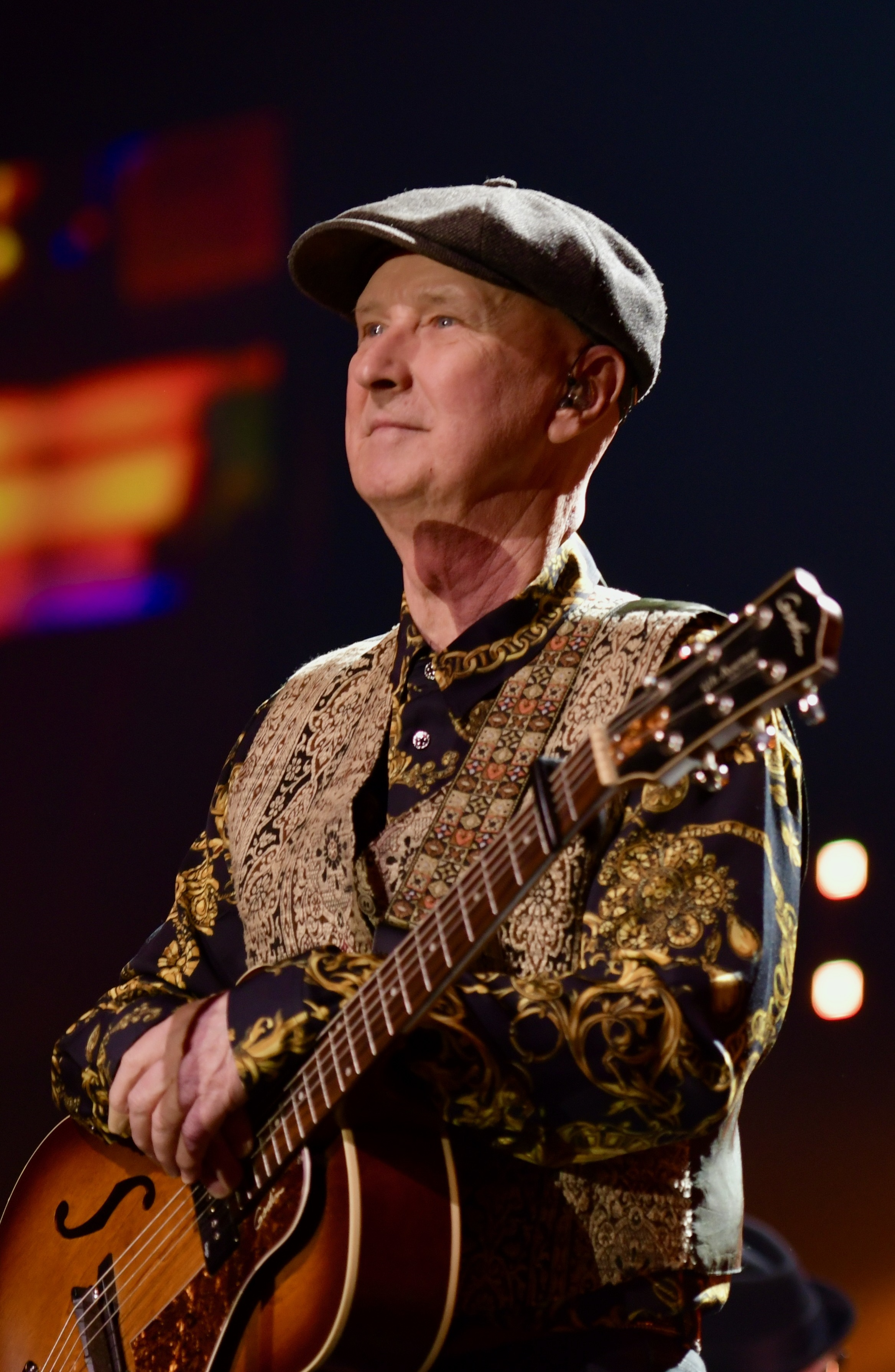
- Stråhed at Melodifestivalen 2022

Background information
- Born: Dan Peter Stråhed; 12 June 1956 (age 70); Malmö, Sweden
- Genres: Dansband, pop
- Occupations: Singer, songwriter, musician
- Instruments: Vocals, guitar, accordion, keyboards
- Labels: Mariann, Parlophone
- Formerly of: Wizex, Chinox, Änglabarn, Danne & The Dynamo

Dan Peter Stråhed (born 12 June 1956) is a Swedish singer, songwriter and musician who has been a member multiple bands since the mid 1970s. This includes the groups, Änglabarn, Chinox, and Wizex.

== Background ==
Danne Stråhed was part of the group Chinox who opened for AC/DC.

He was the lead singer of Wizex for thirteen years. In 1981, he started the band Änglabarn ("Angel children"), who released one music album and was the pre-show act for Queen during their Scandinavian tour.

He participated in Melodifestivalen 2022 with the song "Hallabaloo".

== Career ==
=== 1970s ===
As a member of Chinox, he played piano, organ and sang in the group. In all of those capacities, he contributed to their album, Tunna skivor which was released on the Gazell label in 1976.

In 1979, the group released the Born to Be Alive album which contained the song, "Born to Be Alive". There were two songs, "Det Bästa Till Dej Och Dina Vänner" ("Det Bedste Till Mej Og Mine Venner") and "Lille Du" which were by Gasolin'. Danne Stråhed translated them into Swedish.

=== Leter years ===
In the later years, he was fronting his band, Danne & The Dynamo.

== Discography ==
=== Singles ===
List of singles, with selected chart positions
Title	Year	Peak chart positions	Album
Title	Year	SWE	Album
"Hallabaloo"	2022	34	Non-album single
