= Samira Manners =

British-Swedish singer-songwriter (born 2000)

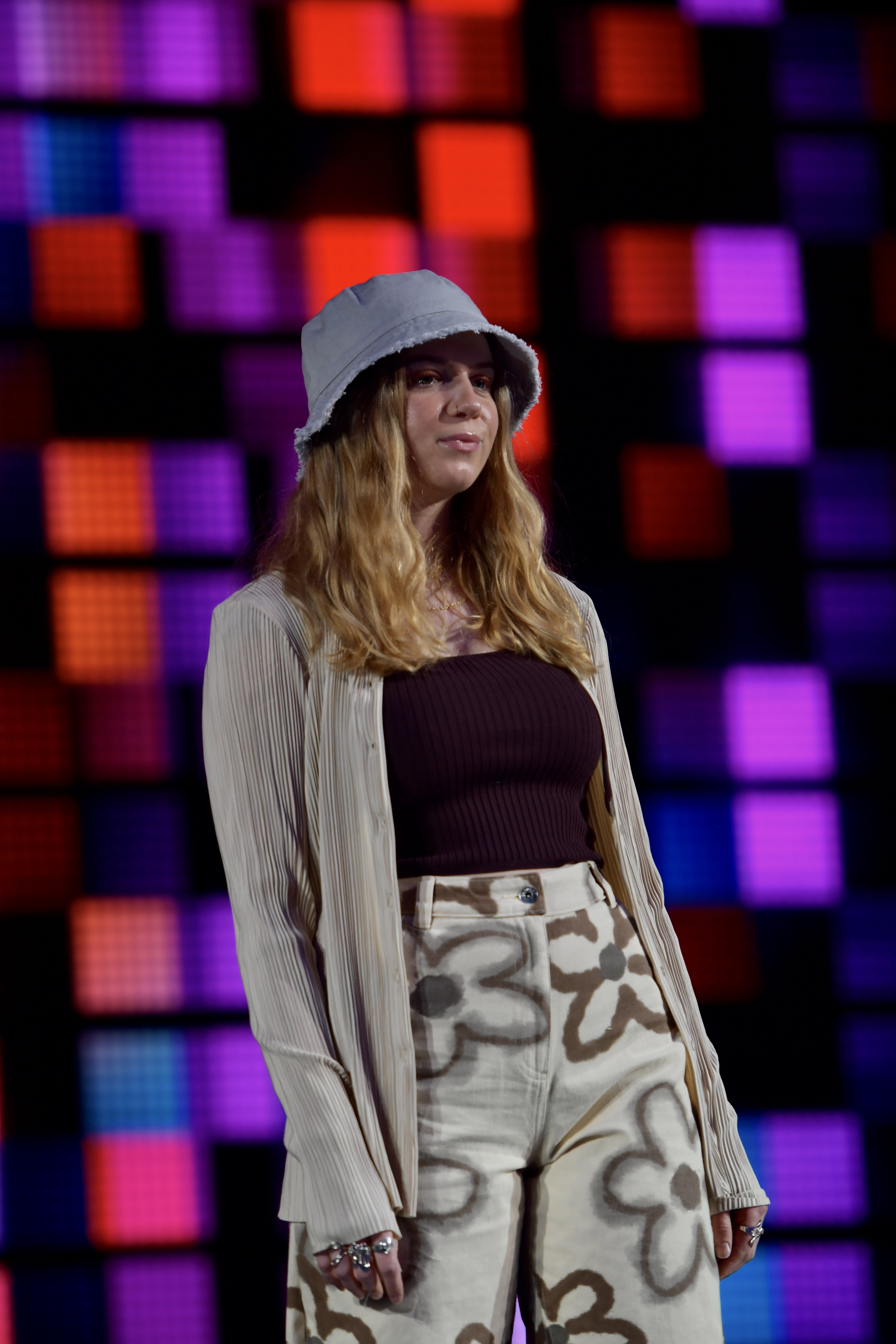
- Samira Manners at Melodifestivalen 2022

Background information
- Born: 9 July 2000 (age 26); Malmö, Sweden

Samira Manners (born 9 July 2000) is a British-Swedish singer-songwriter. Samira has an English father and a Swedish mother. She learnt her first English in pre-school in Southern England and grew up speaking English at home in Sweden. She first signed to Cardiac Records / Sony Music Sweden in 2020, then to Nordic Bridge Music partnered with BMG in 2026, and has released 11 singles.

She participated in Melodifestivalen 2022 with the song "I Want to Be Loved". She performed in Heat 2 on 12 February 2022, finishing in fourth place in the phone vote, fifth place overall, and failing to qualify. She performed onstage with her band: Alice Castell (bass), Kajsa Westergren (drums), and Agnes Roslund (guitar). Since then her band has consisted of Leo Holmberg (guitar), Samuel Nilsson (guitar), Alice Castell (bass), Alice Lidberg (keyboard), and Kajsa Westergren/Ellen Mölck (drums).

== Career ==
Samira studied at Lund's Dance and Musical Gymnasium (LDMG) 2016-2019, Malmö Academy of Music 2021-2022, and Folkhögskolan Skurup and Fridhem Malmö 2022-2023. Since 2024 she has been studying at the Academy of Contemporary Music in London.

=== Live Performances ===
- TV4 Nyhetsmorgon: 2 January 2021, Samira's TV debut singing "Do It All Again" and "Hard To Love"
- The Sunset Festival: 7 August 2021.
- Woman in Red, Malmö Live: 8 October 2021.
- Melodifestivalen 2022: 12 February 2022.
- Lotta på Liseberg: 18 July 2022 - Samira singing "Thankful"; "I Want To Be Loved"; and "Walking on Sunshine"
- SVT Sommarlov 2022: 22 July 2022 - Samira singing "I Want To Be Loved"; and "Thankful".
- CarFest 26 at Silverstone: 30 August 2026 - Samira and her British band showcased her forthcoming EP, including 'house we built', 'surprisingly it don't', and 'erase me, replace me!'.

=== Single Releases ===
- "Do It All Again": 15 May 2020. Video by Benjamin Zadig (Eremit Produktion). 'Pop professor' journalist Jan Gradvall reviewing for TV4 morning news program described the single as "A 19 year old Swedish debutante named Samira Manners who has an English father who colours her perfect English. Excellent, I think." Lucas Palmans reviewing for Dansende beren stated that “Do It All Again” is a perfect example of an oasis of peace, but Samira knows how to give it her own twist. The song starts quietly with an acoustic guitar, while the young singer immediately puts her beautiful voice in the spotlight. She seems to put her soul on the table, singing about love. Many new elements are added throughout the song. For example, synths provide a euphoric effect and the percussion gives a slightly bombastic impression. Bombastic in its intimacy, that is, because “Do It All Again” puts a smile on our faces. In any case, we are already impressed by her voice and the soothing atmosphere that the young lady knows how to create."
- "Hard To Love": 30 October 2020. Because of the Covid-19 restrictions, the video was made by Samira Manners herself. Lucas Palmans reviewing for Dansende beren stated that the atmosphere of “Hard To Love” "became one for the campfire on a pleasant evening. An acoustic guitar creates a nice atmosphere, while the Swedish one enchants you with her powerful voice. The song is an alternation between insecurities and straightening your back. For example, she wonders if it is difficult to love her because of her outspoken opinions and such, but in the end she is very satisfied with herself. A nice meaning and a nice song, especially when some backing vocals are added towards the end."
- "Last Christmas Eve": 20 November 2020. Because of the Covid-19 restrictions, the video "contains nice clips from Samira's Christmas celebrations and winters in her childhood until now" and was made by Samira herself. Ulf Mårtensson reviewing for Ystads Allehanda described the single as "sung with the artist's charming British accent, and bears Samira Manners' singer song-writer signature, a little musically melancholy in tone and lyrics. It's about the fact that everything won't be as usual this Christmas when many can't see loved ones - but that we still have to try to have it as good as possible." Maria Zandihn reviewing for Skånska Dagbladet describes it as "a Christmas song that puts into words what so many feel now, when Christmas is not quite as it usually is. But at the same time a song that gives us hope."
- "Friend Of Mine": 19 March 2021. Because of the Covid-19 restrictions there was no video release. Reviewing for Göteborgs-Posten, Johan Lindqvist argued that "Samira has that kind of voice that settles right in and to that a hyper British accent that at first feels a bit corny, but which I quickly realize is just lovely." Daniel Persson, reviewing for Sydsvenskan, relates how "the new song "Friend of Mine" is about a friend of Samira Manners. A friend who is having a hard time and is in a dark place in life. With text and music, Samira wants to let her friend know that she is always there, no matter what."
- "I Want To Be Loved": 12 February 2022. Reviewing for Dagens Nyheter, Matilda Källén thought that "when Samira Manners stares into the camera and repeats that she wants to be loved, it's hard not to look away. There's something naked about her indie ballad, performed in irresistible Lily Allen British; as if she had managed to distill the feelings on the bus home from being dumped: raw and lingering... 'I Want To Be Loved' is generally an effective and for Melodifestivallen quite unusual song." Ellinor Skagegård reviewing for Svenska Dagbladet described the song performance: "with braces and guitar, starry skies and pure British proununciation, Samira Manners is cut out of some shitty indie romcom. The song is a nice low-key little pop gem that I like in terms of genre,... the whole appearance wins on authenticity and presence."
- "Thankful": 29 April 2022. Video directed by Peter S. Andersson (376 Films). Reviewing "Thankful" for Dagens Industri, Jan Gradvall described Samira as a "Swedish singer-songwriter with great potential": "In a report made in 21-year-old Samira Manners' small apartment in Malmö, you see some vinyl albums on the shelves: 'Sour' by Olivia Rodrigo, '21' by Adele, 'You signed up for this' by Maisie Peters. These influences can be heard in her own music: young and life-hungry singer & song-writer music that simultaneously sounds wise and experienced. The fact that Samira Manners grew up with an English father characterizes her perfect English. The five songs on this EP show that she can reach as far as her role models." Ulf Mårtensson reviewing for Ystads Allehanda described the song as a "spring-like, happy single" reflecting all the love she got after Melodifestivalen.
- "Not An Answer": 13 January 2023. Johan Lindqvist reviewing "Not an Answer" for Göteborgs-Posten described the single as: "Samira ... keeps a consistent line with her music. Even if the new song is a little more produced, it is still the acoustic touch that is the basis. Nice and neat melody and Samira Manners of course sings elegantly and with a dressy austerity that contrasts nicely with the emotional lyrics. Nice that she continues to control her music with a sure hand." Reviewing for Ystads Allehanda, Ulf Mårtensson sets out how "Samira writes closely about what hurts, and how she gives voice to the experiences of others, not her own strictly personal experiences. The song is about seeking contact and confirmation – perhaps love – and is met with silence. Not an answer."
- "How-To-Be-Decent Guide": 21 April 2023. The single provides upbeat tempo, energy and a guide on how to behave towards other people - it's about the feeling of being so incredibly finished with someone that you no longer have anything to hold back. Reviewing the single for That Eurovision Site, Angus Postma writes that "musically this is unmistakably Samira Manners, while lyrically she sings about being so done with someone that she feels the need to offer them a “How-To-Be-Decent Guide”.
- "house we built": 14 November 2025. Colin Polonowski's review for TuneFountain argues that "‘house we built’ is a beautifully crafted release that shows why Samira Manners stands out as a compelling new voice in the UK scene.... What makes ‘house we built’ so striking is its honesty. It avoids exaggeration and focuses on the real experience of losing the life you thought you were building. Samira captures the moment when memory and present collide, and she does so with maturity and precision. This release feels like a step into a new phase of her artistry, one marked by confidence in her writing and a clear vision for her sound." Reviewing for The Buzz, Ngaire Ruth describes how the music video for House We Built reflects a sense of being on the outside looking in - a sense of starting anew in a different country, and thoughts and feelings about relationships that resonate too.
- "surprisingly it don't": 24 April 2026. Reviewing for Music Crowns, Boulent Mustafa writes that "With its stripped-back acoustic production, intimate vocals, and diaristic lyricism, the track allows raw emotion to take centre stage." and that "‘surprisingly it don’t’ features a gentle and calming piano arrangement and the emotionally stirring vocals of Samira Manners." Ngaire Ruth for The Buzz, describes how the new release Surprisingly It Don’t reflects Samira's qualities: "intimate storytelling, unique vocals, uncomplicated pitch and tone, and arrangement, with a warming production outro. Songs are accessible; everyone can put their own spin on it."
- "erase me, replace me!": 18 September 2026. TuneFountain's review argues that "‘erase me, replace me!’ works best in the friction between its upbeat acoustic folk-pop and writing that still carries resentment. The repeated image of haunting the walls gives the song a strong centre, while the more pointed lines prevent its acceptance from becoming overly neat. Samira allows anger, sarcasm and self-respect to occupy the same song, making the aftermath feel less like closure arriving all at once and more like somebody gradually recognising what they should never have accepted. The production’s brighter direction also stops the song becoming weighed down by its subject. Instead of asking for sympathy, ‘erase me, replace me!’ turns rejection into momentum and lets the humour in Samira’s writing sit alongside the bruises underneath it. As a third glimpse of the house we built, it presents a songwriter prepared to look directly at what hurt while still finding room to be pointed, playful and certain that leaving does not mean being forgotten."

== Discography ==
=== Singles ===
Title	Year	Peak chart positions	Album
Title	Year	SWE	Album
"Do It All Again"	2020		Non-album single
"Hard to Love"	2020		Non-album single
"Last Christmas Eve"	2020		Non-album single
"Friend of Mine"	2021		Non-album single
"I Want to Be Loved"	2022	69	Non-album single
"Thankful"	2022		Non-album single
"Not an Answer"	2023		Non-album single
"How-To-Be-Decent Guide"	2023		Non-Album Single
"house we built"	2025		Non-Album Single
"surprisingly it don't"	2026		Non-album Single
"erase me, replace me!"	2026		Non-album Single
