= Freedom (Faith Kakembo song) =

Single by Faith Kakembo
- Released: 26 February 2022
- Length: 2:54
- Label: Warner Music Sweden
- Songwriters: Anderz Wrethov; Laurell Barker; Palle Hammarlund

Faith Kakembo singles chronology
"O Come, All Ye Faithful" (2021)	"Freedom" (2022)

"Freedom" is a song by Swedish singer Faith Kakembo, released as a single on 26 February 2022. It was performed in Melodifestivalen 2022 and made it to the final on 12 March 2022.

== Track listing ==
Digital single
No.	Title	Length
1.	"Freedom"	2:54
2.	"Crying Rivers"	2:56

== Charts ==
Chart performance for "Freedom"
Chart (2022)	Peak position
Sweden (Sverigetopplistan)	15
