= In i dimman =

Single by Medina
- Released: 26 February 2022
- Length: 2:53
- Label: Giant
- Songwriter(s): Jimmy Thörnfeldt; Sami Rekik; Dino Medanhodzic; Ali Jammali

"In i dimman" (Swedish: [ˈɪnː iː ˈdɪ̂mːan]; transl. "Into the fog") is a Swedish-language song by Swedish hip hop duo Medina, released as a single on 26 February 2022. It was performed in Melodifestivalen 2022 and made it to the final on 12 March 2022, where it finished third.

== Charts ==
=== Weekly charts ===
Weekly chart performance for "In i dimman"
Chart (2022)	Peak position
Sweden (Sverigetopplistan)	2

=== Year-end charts ===
Year-end chart performance for "In i dimman"
Chart (2022)	Position
Sweden (Sverigetopplistan)	13
