= Niello (rapper) =

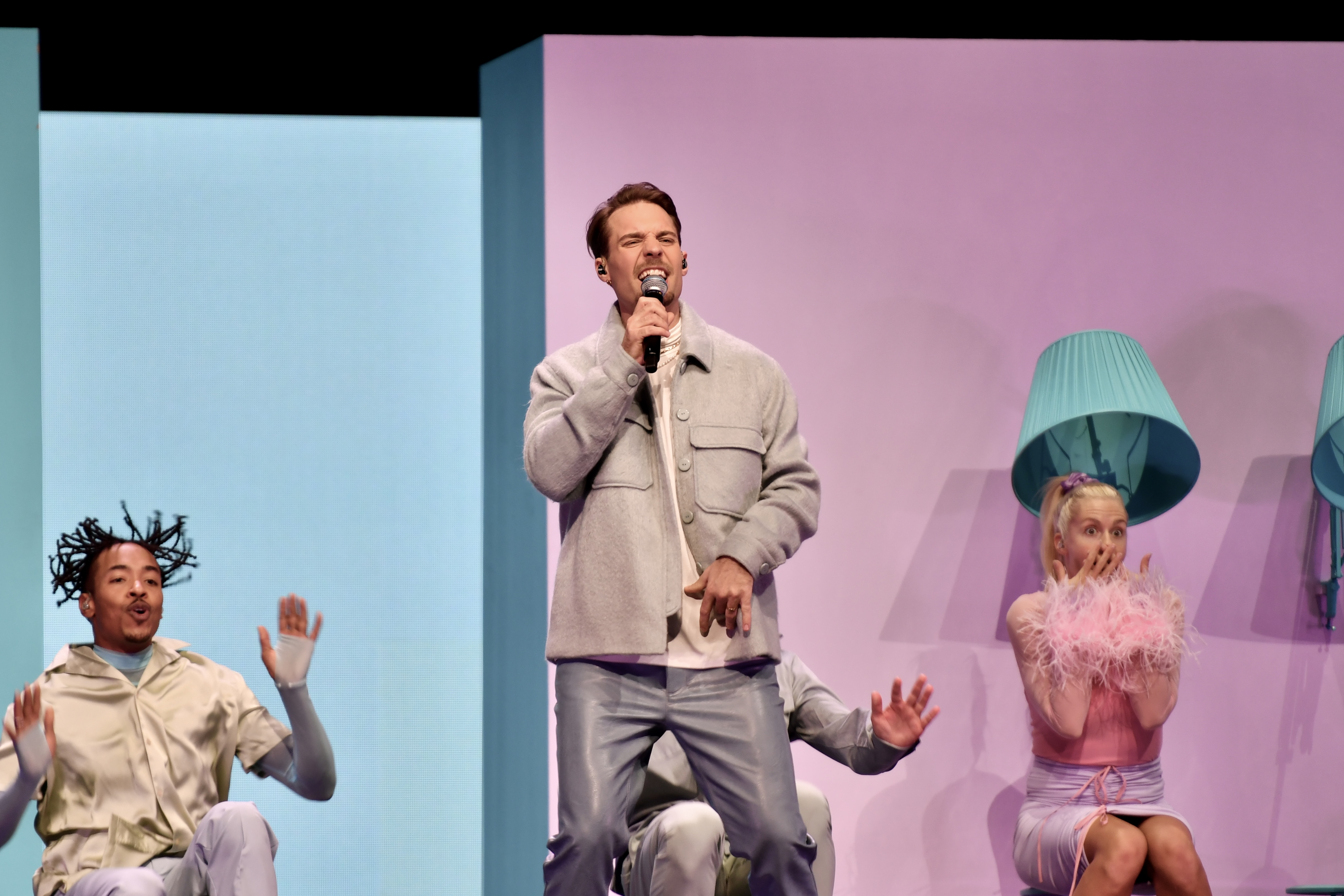
- Niello at Melodifestivalen 2022

Background information
- Born: Niklas Grahn
- Origin: Sweden
- Genres: Hip hop; electronic
- Occupations: Singer; rapper
- Label: Sony Music

Niklas Grahn, better known by his stage name Niello, is a Swedish rapper and singer. His name derives from niello decoration made of mixture of copper, silver, and lead, and used as a weapon on engraved or etched metal. He is signed to Sony Music Sweden.

Niello gained fame through his initial release, "Svett". His single "Legenden", released in June 2013 featuring Phantomen, garnered him great chart success, reaching number 3 on the Swedish Singles Chart. It was also certified 2× Platinum in the country.

He participated in Melodifestivalen 2022 with the song ”Tror du att jag bryr mig” with Lisa Ajax. They performed in Heat 2 on 12 February 2022, finishing in last place and failing to qualify.

== Discography ==
=== Albums ===
Title	Details
Dahlia	Released: 29 November 2019; Label: Sony Music; Formats: Digital download, streaming

=== Singles ===
Year	Single	Peak positions	Certification	Album
Year	Single	SWE	Certification	Album
2013	"Svett"	—		Non-album singles
2013	"Legenden" (feat. Phantomen)	3	GLF: 2× Platinum	Non-album singles
2014	"Arlanda" (feat. Truls)	—		Non-album singles
2014	"Ikaros"	—		Non-album singles
2015	"Vinden"	— (Note: "Vinden" did not enter the Swedish Singles Chart, but peaked at number 11 on the Swedish Heatseeker chart.)		Vinden EP
2016	"Backa" (feat. Albin and Mattias Andréasson)	— (Note: "Backa" did not enter the Swedish Singles Chart, but peaked at number two on the Swedish Heatseeker chart.)		Non-album single
2022	"Tror du att jag bryr mig" (with Lisa Ajax)	7		Melodifestivalen 2022

== Links ==
- Profile, posk.se; accessed 13 March 2018. (in Swedish)
- Profile, merinfo.se; accessed 13 March 2018. (in Swedish)
- Profile, ratsit.se; accessed 13 March 2018. (in Swedish)
