= Innocent Love (Robin Bengtsson song) =

Single by Robin Bengtsson
- Released: 26 February 2022
- Length: 3:02
- Label: Universal
- Songwriters: David Lindgren Zacharias; Sebastian Atas; Victor Sjöström; Victor Crone; Viktor Broberg

Robin Bengtsson singles chronology
"Oh My God" (2021)	"Innocent Love" (2022)

"Innocent Love" is a song by Swedish singer Robin Bengtsson, released as a single on 26 February 2022. It was performed in Melodifestivalen 2022 and made it to the final on 12 March 2022.

== Charts ==
Chart performance for "Innocent Love"
Chart (2022)	Peak position
Sweden (Sverigetopplistan)	10

== Certifications ==
Certifications for "Innocent Love"
Region	Certification	Certified units/sales
Sweden (GLF)	Gold	4,000,000^{†}
^{†} Streaming-only figures based on certification alone.
