= Anders Bagge =

Swedish composer, lyricist, musician and record producer

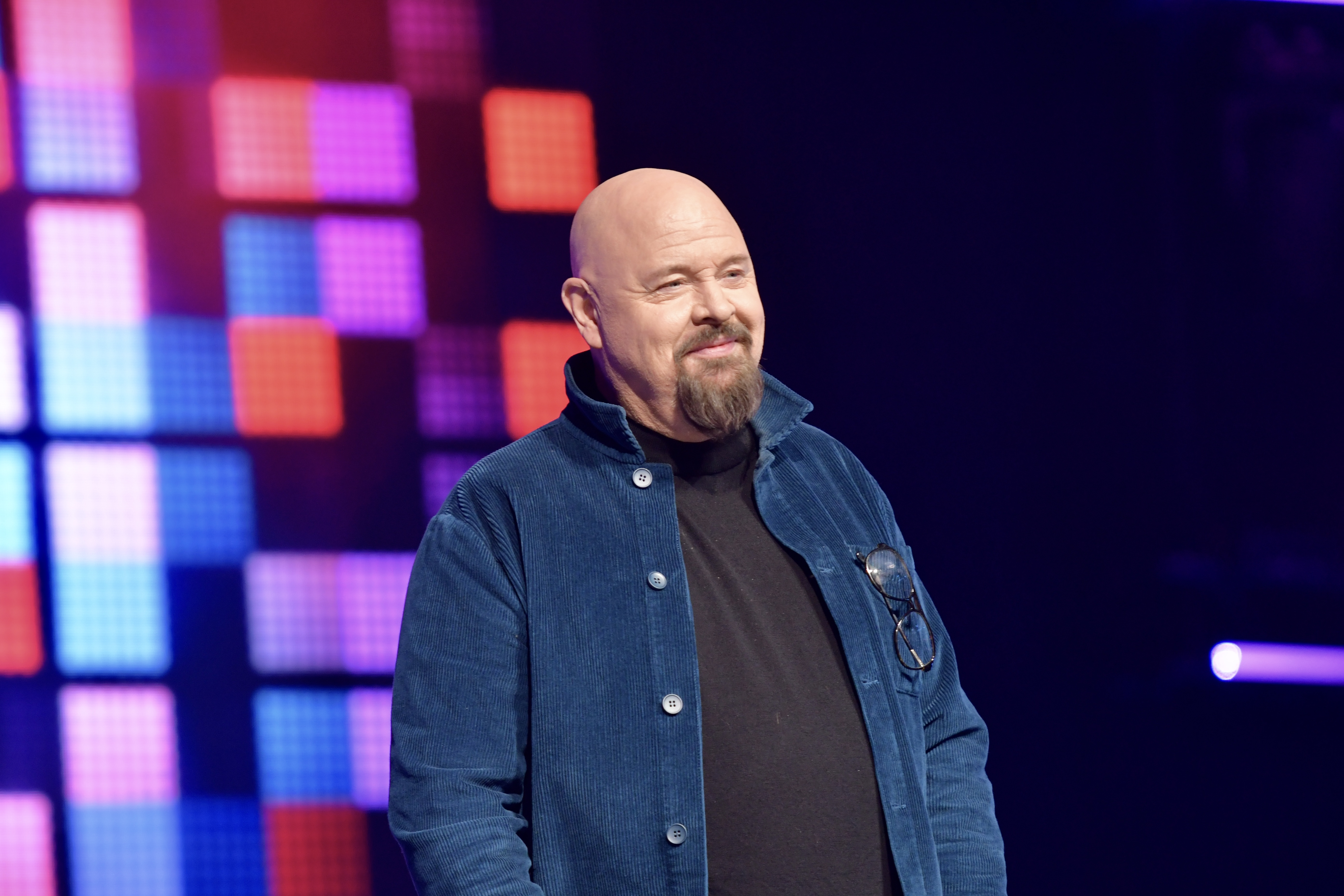
- Anders Bagge in 2022
- Born: 16 January 1968 (age 58); Enskede, Stockholm, Sweden
- Occupations: Songwriter, music producer

Sven Anders Bagge (Swedish pronunciation: [svɛn ˈânːdɛʂ ˈbǎɡːɛ]; born 16 January 1968) is a Swedish composer, lyricist, musician and record producer.

Bagge is one half of the songwriter-producer duo Bagge & Peer, together with Peer Åström. He is also known for his frequent appearances as a judge on the TV series Idol on the Swedish TV4 channel, and for being a co-founder of the Stockholm-based music production company Murlyn Music Group.

== Early life ==
Bagge grew up in a family of musicians. His father, Sven-Olof Bagge, also worked as a producer and songwriter during the 20th century. Looking up to his father, Anders began practicing the trumpet and piano as a child. At seventeen years old, he started producing. By his early twenties, he started discovering artists. He also worked for some time with Cheiron before deciding to work independently.

== Music career ==
In the early 1990s, Bagge was a member of the group Legacy of Sound. He formed Murlyn in 1997, and would have a big hit the following year, co-writing and co-producing the song Because of You, performed by the American boy band 98 Degrees, which peaked at #3 on the Billboard Hot 100 and was certified platinum in the United States.

He has written and produced songs for Westlife, Janet Jackson, Celine Dion, Madonna, Santana, Jennifer Lopez, Anastacia, Nick Lachey, Jessica Simpson, Samantha Mumba, Lara Fabian, Enrique Iglesias, Ace of Base and Ashley Tisdale, among others. In 2005, he was awarded Best Pop Song at the BMI London Awards, for producing Janet Jackson's "All Nite (Don't Stop)."

Bagge has participated in the Eurovision Song Contest twice as a songwriter, both times representing Azerbaijan; in 2010 with the song "Drip Drop" performed by Safura Alizadeh, and in 2012 with the song "When the Music Dies", performed by Sabina Babayeva. In 2022, he participated as a solo performer in Melodifestivalen with the song "Bigger than the Universe", hoping to represent his native Sweden at the Eurovision Song Contest 2022. In the final, the song received the highest number of audience points, but ultimately finished second to Cornelia Jakobs' "Hold Me Closer".

== Other ventures ==
Bagge is known in Sweden for his many TV appearances, including as a judge on talent shows Idol and Made in Sweden, and as a contestant in Körslaget, Hela kändis-Sverige bakar, and Masked Singer Sverige.

== Personal life ==
Bagge was married to singer Laila Bagge Wahlgren between 1994 and 2001. In August 2018, Bagge married Johanna Lind, another music artist. Their wedding was the subject of a reality TV series, Cirkus Bagge, on Sjuan.

Bagge was diagnosed with attention deficit hyperactivity disorder (ADHD) in 2013.

== Discography ==
=== Singles ===
Title	Year	Peak chart positions	Album
Title	Year	SWE	Album
"Bigger than the Universe"	2022	2	Non-album single

== Publication ==
- Bagge, Anders; Bjurberg, Helén (2019). Mitt liv [My life] (in Swedish). Stockholm: Månpocket. ISBN 978-91-7503-960-2. OCLC 1096232378. Autobiography.
