= Higher Power (Anna Bergendahl song) =

2022 single by Anna Bergendahl

Single by Anna Bergendahl
- Released: 26 February 2022
- Length: 3:00
- Label: Freebird; Warner Music Sweden
- Songwriters: Anna Bergendahl; Bobby Ljunggren; Erik Bernholm; Thomas G:son

Anna Bergendahl singles chronology
"Bottom of This Bottle" (2021)	"Higher Power" (2022)	"Demons and Dreams" (2022)

"Higher Power" is a song by Swedish singer Anna Bergendahl, released as a single on 26 February 2022. It was performed in Melodifestivalen 2022 and made it to the final on 12 March 2022. In the final, it came in 12th place.

== Melodifestivalen ==
Bergendahl performed Higher Power in Heat 4 on 26 February 2022. It received 73 points and made it to the semi-finals on 5 March. In semi-final 1 it was in the top 2 and qualified to the final on 12 March. In the final, the song received 11 points from the international juries and 18 points from the televote which made it come in 12th place.

== Charts ==
Chart performance for "Higher Power"
Chart (2022)	Peak position
Sweden (Sverigetopplistan)	17
