= Bigger than the Universe =

Single by Anders Bagge
- Released: 26 February 2022
- Length: 3:02
- Label: Promotor Media; Warner Music Sweden
- Songwriter(s): Anders Bagge; Jimmy Jansson; Peter Boström; Thomas G:son

"Bigger than the Universe" is a song by Swedish singer Anders Bagge, released as a single on 26 February 2022. It was performed in Melodifestivalen 2022 and made it to the final on 12 March 2022.

== Charts ==
=== Weekly charts ===
Weekly chart performance for "Bigger than the Universe"
| Chart (2022) | Peak position |
|---|---|
| Sweden (Sverigetopplistan) | 2 |

=== Year-end charts ===
Year-end chart performance for "Bigger than the Universe"
| Chart (2022) | Position |
|---|---|
| Sweden (Sverigetopplistan) | 51 |
