= Som du vill =

Single by Theoz
- Released: 5 February 2022
- Length: 2:53
- Label: Giant; Warner Music Sweden
- Songwriter(s): Axel Schylström; Elize Ryd; Jimmy Thörnfeldt; Tim Larsson; Tobias Lundgren

"Som du vill" (Swedish: [sɔm dʉː ˈvɪlː]; transl. "As you want") is a Swedish language song by Swedish singer Theoz, released as a single on 5 February 2022. It was performed in Melodifestivalen 2022 and made it to the final on 12 March 2022.

== Track listing ==
Digital single
No.	Title	Length
1.	"Som du vill"	2:53
2.	"Hooked on a Feeling"	3:01

== Charts ==
=== Weekly charts ===
Weekly chart performance for "Som du vill"
Chart (2022)	Peak position
Sweden (Sverigetopplistan)	7

=== Year-end charts ===
Year-end chart performance for "Som du vill"
Chart (2022)	Position
Sweden (Sverigetopplistan)	62
