= Tone Sekelius =

Swedish singer

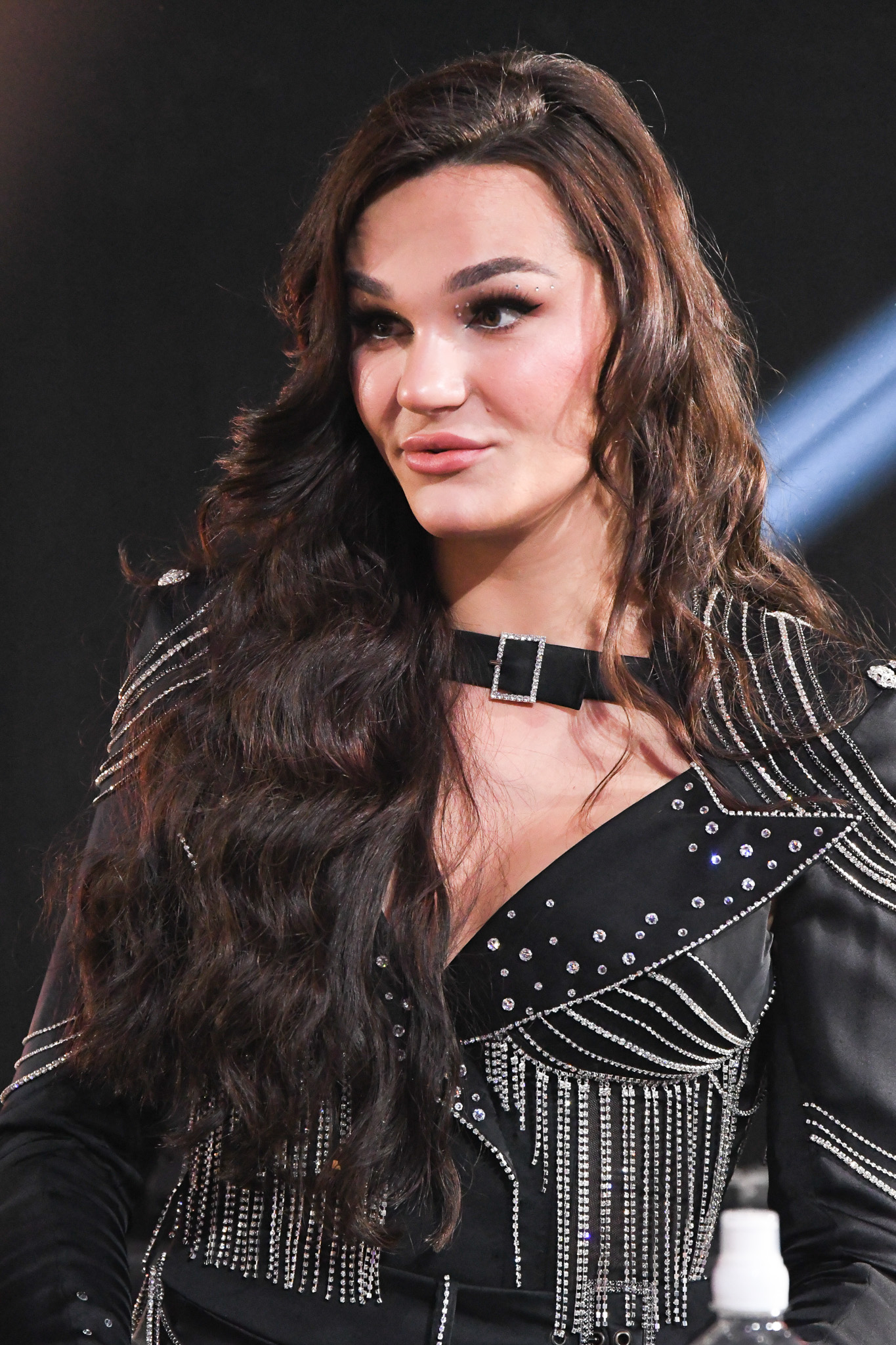
- Sekelius in 2023

Background information
- Born: 16 July 1997 (age 28); Växjö, Sweden

Tone Sekelius (born 16 July 1997) is a Swedish social media influencer and singer.

== Career ==
Sekelius' song "Awakening" entered Sverigetopplistan, the official Swedish singles' chart, at place 89 in February 2017.

In a 2021 interview with Aftonbladet, Sekelius came out as transgender and revealed that she would change her name to Tone. Sekelius' first name had previously been Thomas.

Sekelius competed in Melodifestivalen 2022 with the song "My Way". She was the first openly transgender performer in the contest. She placed 5th in the final with 84 points.

In 2023, Sekelius was a guest celebrity judge in the episode "Marathon Talent Hunt" of the reality television series Drag Race Sverige broadcast on SVT1 and SVT Play. She competed in Melodifestivalen 2023 with the song "Rhythm of My Show", which went on to place 12th (last) in the final with 20 points.

== Discography ==
=== Singles ===
List of singles, with selected chart positions
Title	Year	Peak chart positions	Album
Title	Year	SWE	Album
"Awakening"	2017	89	Non-album singles
"One More in the Crowd"	2017	—	Non-album singles
"Christmas Lights"	2018	—	Non-album singles
"My Way"	2022	9	Non-album singles
"What a Shame"	2022	—	Non-album singles
"Crying on Christmas"	2022	—	Non-album singles
"Rhythm of My Show"	2023	19	Non-album singles
