= Bluffin (Liamoo song) =

Single by Liamoo
- B-side: "Dark"
- Released: 26 February 2022
- Length: 2:59
- Label: Giant
- Songwriters: Ali Jammali; Dino Medanhodzic; Jimmy Thörnfeldt; Sami Rekik

Liamoo singles chronology
"Guld, svett & tårar" (2022)	"Bluffin" (2022)

"Bluffin" is a song by Swedish singer Liamoo, released as a single on 26 February 2022. It was performed in Melodifestivalen 2022 and made it to the final on 12 March 2022.

== Track listing ==
Digital download and stream
No.	Title	Length
1.	"Bluffin"	2:59
2.	"Dark"	2:50

== Charts ==
Chart performance for "Bluffin"
Chart (2022)	Peak position
Sweden (Sverigetopplistan)	8
