= My Way (Tone Sekelius song) =

Single by Tone Sekelius
- Released: 12 February 2022
- Length: 3:02
- Label: Imperial; Warner Music Sweden
- Songwriter(s): Tone Sekelius; Anderz Wrethov

"My Way" is a song by Swedish singer Tone Sekelius, released as a single on 12 February 2022. It was performed in Melodifestivalen 2022 and made it to the final on 12 March 2022.

== Charts ==
Chart performance for "My Way"
Chart (2022)	Peak position
Sweden (Sverigetopplistan)	9
