= Theoz =

Swedish influencer and singer (born 2005)

Theo
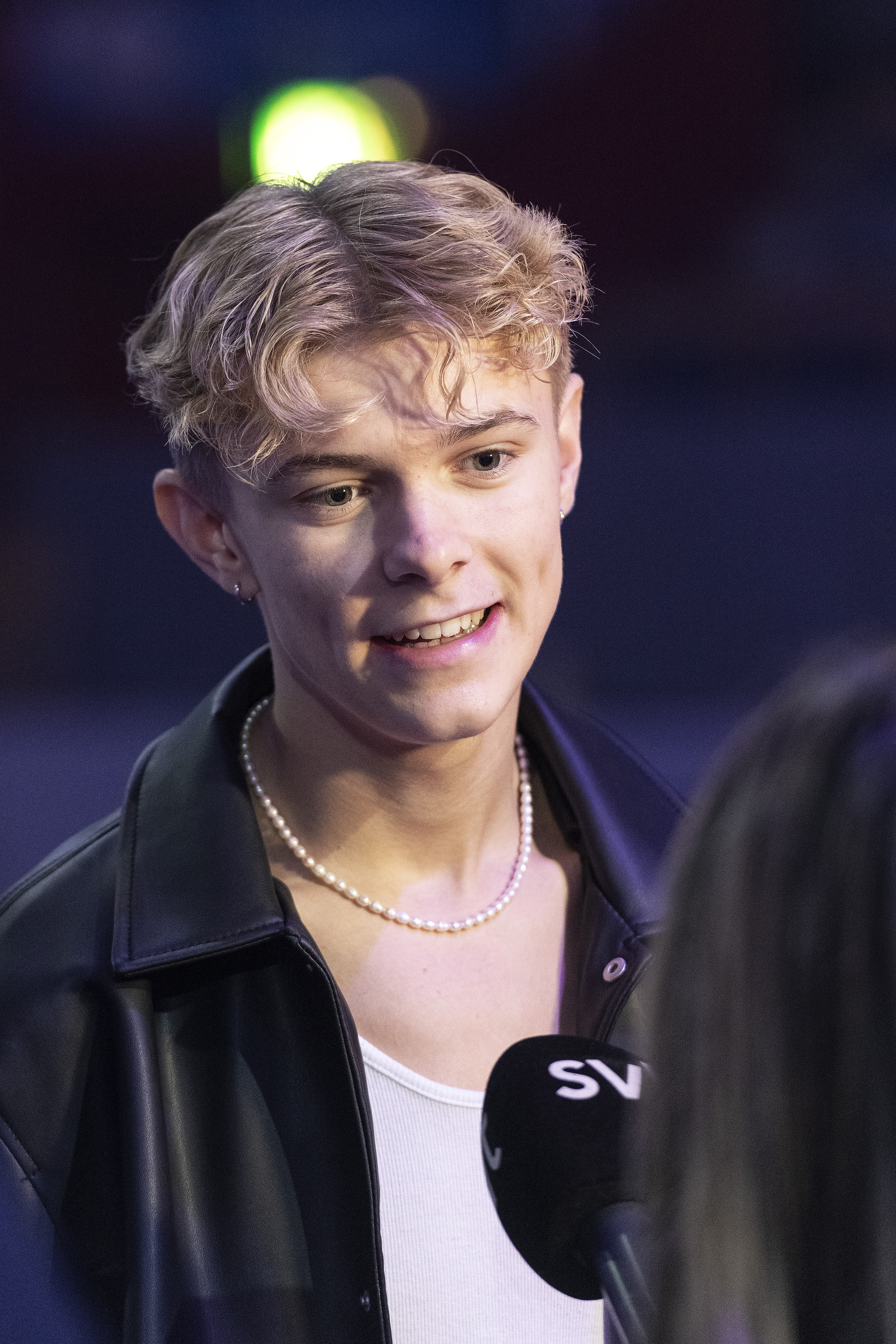
- Theoz in 2023

Background information
- Also known as: Theoz
- Born: Theodor Jan Haraldsson; 17 July 2005 (age 21); Linköping, Sweden
- Genre: Pop
- Occupations: Social media personality; singer; dancer; actor
- Label: Warner Music Sweden
- Website: theoharaldsson.com

Theodor Jan Haraldsson (born 17 July 2005), known mononymously as Theo (formerly Theoz) is a Swedish social media personality, singer and actor. He started his career by posting videos to Musical.ly in 2016 with the name Theoz. In 2020, he had a leading role in the movie Rymdresan opposite Robert Gustafsson. In 2021, he performed his music at Lotta på Liseberg, which is broadcast on TV4. Theoz participated in Melodifestivalen 2022 with the song "Som du vill", which finished 7th, and in Melodifestivalen 2023 with "Mer av dig", which finished 5th. He participated as a celebrity dancer in Let's Dance 2025 broadcast on TV4 and won the competition with dance partner Paulina Rosenkvist.

== Discography ==
=== EPs ===
Title	Year	Peak chart positions
Title	Year	SWE
Min Theori	2019	—
Paradis	2022	—
Julmusiken	2022	—
Sped Up Collection	2023	—
Mer av dig	2023	7

=== Compilation albums ===
- Best of Theoz (2022)

=== Singles ===
Title	Year	Peak chart positions	Album
Title	Year	SWE	Album
"Lately"	2018	—	Non-album single
"Het"	2018	53	Min Theori
"Best Girl in the World"	2018	—	Non-album singles
"Why Why Why"	2018	—	Non-album singles
"Theori"	2019	—	Min Theori
"Atmosfär"	2019	—	Min Theori
"Årets julklapp"	2019	—	Julmusiken
"Party Animal"	2020	—	Non-album single
"More"	2020	—	Non-album single
"Hooked on a Feeling"	2021	—	Non-album single
"Som du vill"	2022	5	Paradis
"Painkiller"	2022	—	Paradis
"Shady"	2022	—	Paradis
"Paradis"	2022	—	Paradis
"Det kommer bli bra"	2022	—	Paradis
"Julmusiken"	2022	73	Julmusiken
"Mer av dig"	2023	2	Mer av dig
"Otursdag"	2023	—	Mer av dig
"Bara lite grann (Sommar igen)"	2023	— (Note: "Bara lite grann (Sommar igen)" did not enter the Swedish Singellista Chart, but peaked at number one on the Swedish Heatseeker Chart.)	Non-album singles
"Någon annan"	2023	—	Non-album singles
"Dagar som aldrig tar slut"	2024	—	Non-album singles
"Vill va honom"	2024	—	Non-album singles
"Närmare då"	2025	—	Non-album singles
