= List of Melodifestivalen presenters =

This list includes those who have acted as presenters of Melodifestivalen. In 1986, there were two presenters for the first time, with three and four presenter line-ups later introduced in 2004 (as two sets) and 2019 respectively, while in 2005, 2016 and 2021, various people presented the shows (in 2016 and 2021 as guest co-hosts in each show alongside a main presenter). Melodifestivalen 2000 was presented by no less than 10 past participants and winners.

== Presenters ==
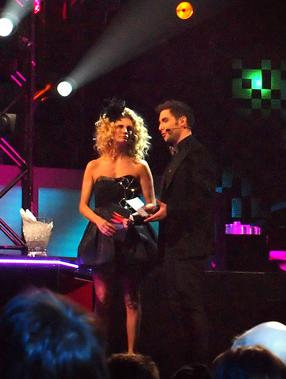
Hosts Christine Meltzer and Måns Zelmerlöw during the second heat of Melodifestivalen 2010 in Sandviken.

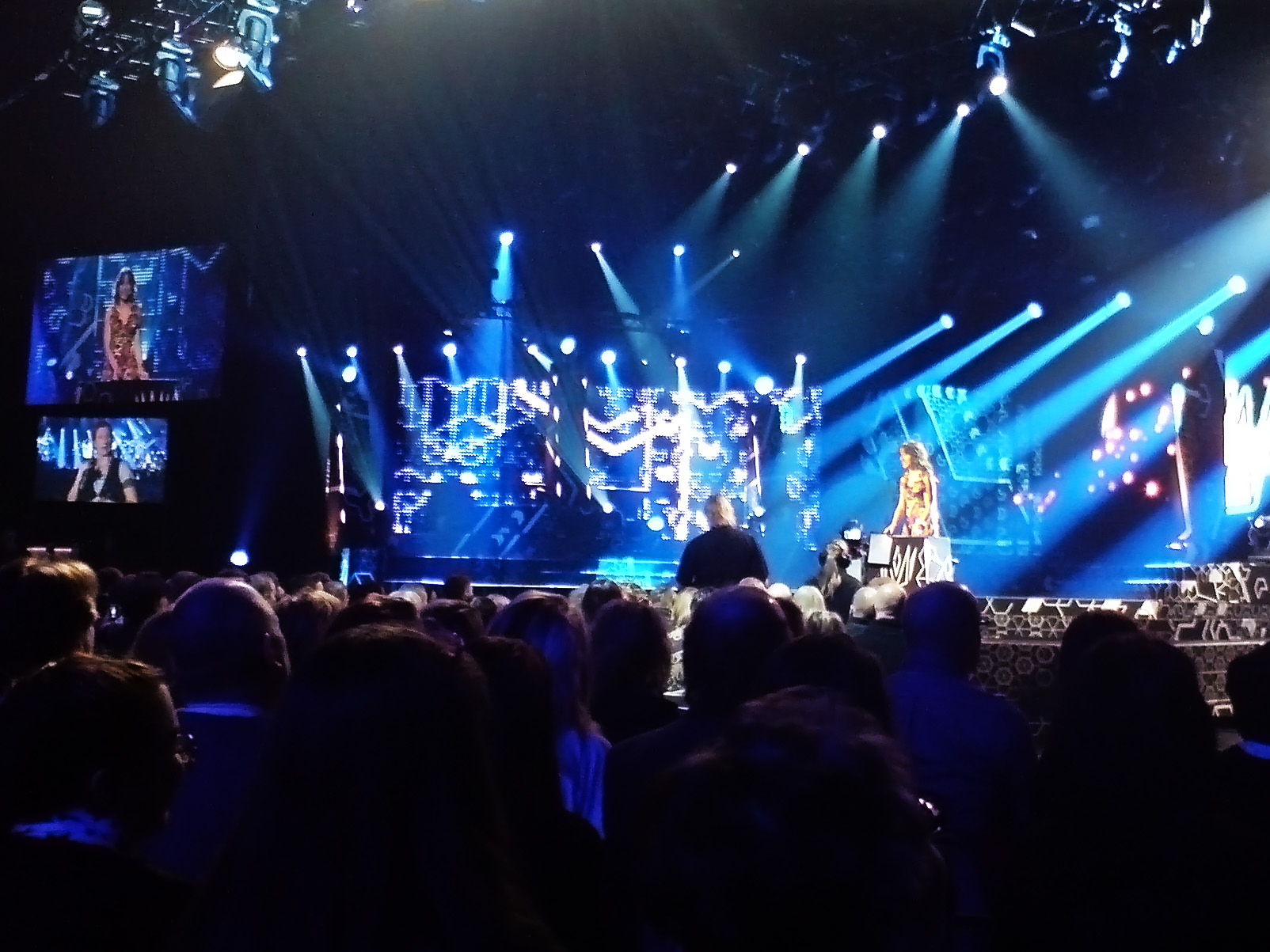
Petra Mede, during the third heat of Melodifestivalen 2009 in Tegera Arena in Leksand.

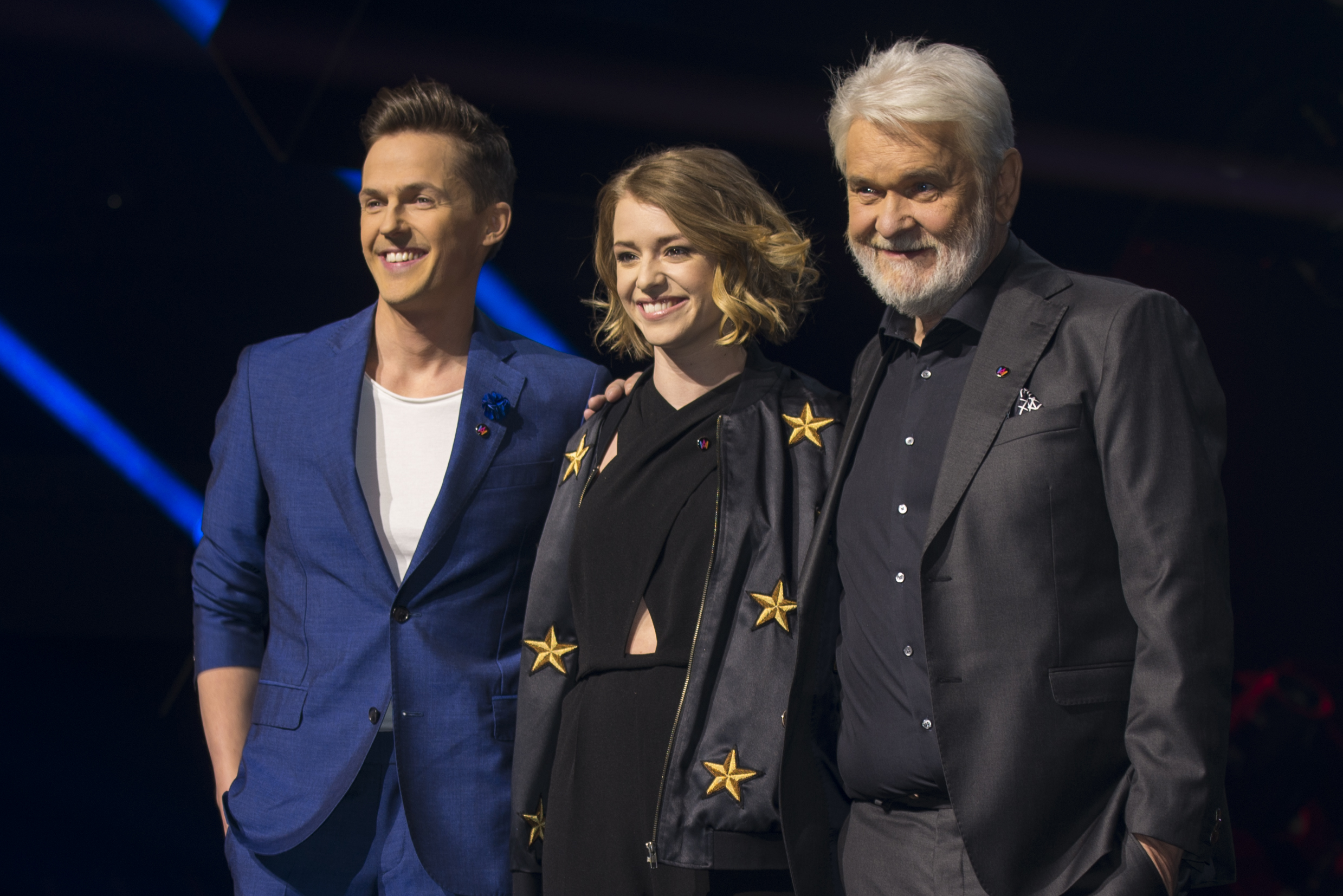
Presenters of Melodifestivalen 2017: David Lindgren, Clara Henry and Hasse Andersson.

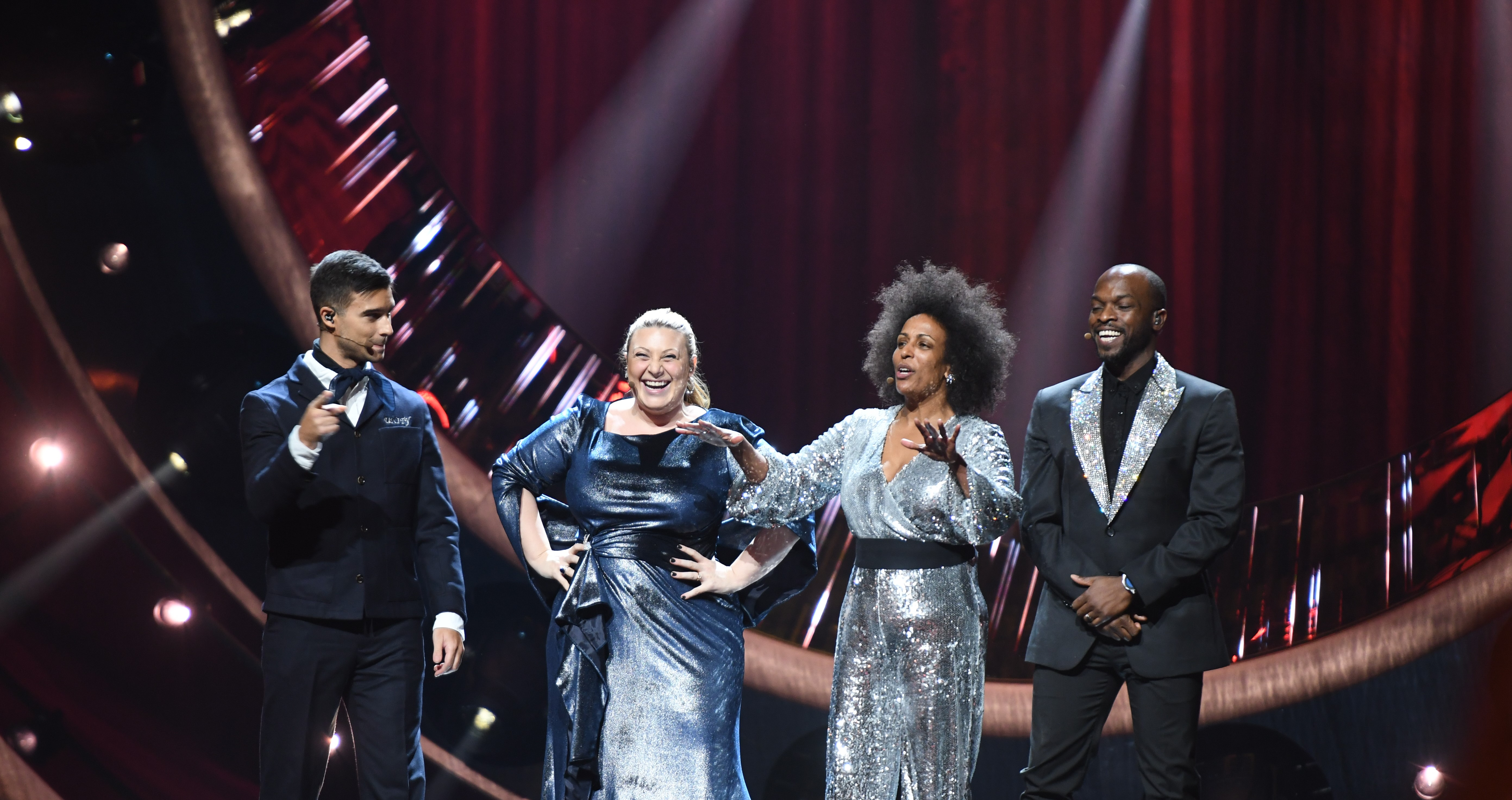
2019 hosts: Eric Saade, Sarah Dawn Finer, Marika Carlsson and Kodjo Akolor.

Year	Presenter(s)
1959	Thore Ehrling
1960	Jeanette von Heidenstam
1961	Jeanette von Heidenstam
1962	Bengt Feldreich
1963	Sven Lindahl
1964	Sweden did not participate in Eurovision
1965	Birgitta Sandstedt
1966	Sven Lindahl
1967	Maud Husberg
1968	Magnus Banck
1969	Pekka Langer
1970	Sweden did not participate in Eurovision
1971	Lennart Hyland
1972	Gunilla Marcus-Luboff
1973	Alicia Lundberg
1974	Johan Sandström
1975	Karin Falck
1976	Sweden did not participate in Eurovision
1977	Ulf Elfving
1978	Ulf Elfving
1979	Ulf Elfving
1980	Bengt Bedrup
1981	Janne Loffe Carlsson
1982	Fredrik Belfrage
1983	Bibi Johns
1984	Fredrik Belfrage
1985	Eva Andersson
1986	Lennart Swahn and Tommy Engstrand
1987	Fredrik Belfrage
1988	Bengt Grafström
1989	Yvonne Ryding Bergqvist and John Chrispinsson
1990	Carin Hjulström
1991	Harald Treutiger
1992	Adde Malmberg and Claes Malmberg
1993	Triple & Touch
1994	Kattis Ahlström and Sven Melander
1995	Pernilla Månsson Colt
1996	Pontus Gårdinger and Siw Malmkvist
1997	Jan Jingryd
1998	Pernilla Månsson Colt and Magnus Karlsson
1999	Anders Lundin and Vendela Kirsebom Thommesen
2000	Carola Häggkvist; Lotta Engberg; Lena Philipsson; Loa Falkman; Tommy Körberg; Elisabeth Andreassen; Arja Saijonmaa; Lasse Berghagen; Lasse Holm; Björn Skifs
2001	Josefine Sundström and Henrik Olsson
2002	Kristin Kaspersen and Claes Åkeson
2003	Mark Levengood (heats & final); Charlotte Perrelli and Lena Philipsson (heat 1); Carola Häggkvist (heat 2); Barbro Svensson (heat 3); Roger Pontare (heat 4); Marianne Rundström and Rickard Olsson (viewers' choice); Jonas Gardell (final)
2004	Charlotte Perrelli, Ola Lindholm and Peter Settman (heats & final); Liza Marklund, Elin "Grynet" Ek and Henrik Johnsson (second chance)
2005	Alexandra Pascalidou and Shan Atci (heat 1); Henrik Schyffert and Erik Haag (heat 2); Johanna Westman and Markoolio (heat 3); Kayo and Michael Leijnegard (heat 4); Annika Jankell (second chance); Jill Johnson and Mark Levengood (final)
2006	Lena Philipsson (heats & final); Carin Hjulström and Henrik Johnsson (second chance)
2007	Kristian Luuk
2008	Kristian Luuk, Björn Gustafsson and Nour El-Refai
2009	Petra Mede
2010	Måns Zelmerlöw, Christine Meltzer and Dolph Lundgren
2011	Rickard Olsson and Marie Serneholt
2012	Gina Dirawi, Sarah Dawn Finer and Helena Bergström
2013	Gina Dirawi and Danny Saucedo
2014	Nour El-Refai and Anders Jansson
2015	Sanna Nielsen and Robin Paulsson
2016	Gina Dirawi (all shows); Petra Mede (heat 1); Charlotte Perrelli (heat 2); Henrik Schyffert (heat 3); Sarah Dawn Finer (heat 4); Ola Salo, Peter Jöback (second chance); William Spetz (final)
2017	Clara Henry, David Lindgren and Hasse Andersson
2018	David Lindgren and Fab Freddie
2019	Sarah Dawn Finer, Kodjo Akolor, Marika Carlsson and Eric Saade
2020	Linnea Henriksson, Lina Hedlund and David Sundin
2021	Christer Björkman (all shows); Lena Philipsson (heat 1); Oscar Zia, Anis Don Demina (heat 2); Jason Diakité (heat 3); Per Andersson, Pernilla Wahlgren (heat 4); Shirley Clamp (second chance); Måns Zelmerlöw, Shima Niavarani (final)
2022	Oscar Zia and Farah Abadi (all shows); Eva Rydberg (heat 2); Johanna Nordström (heat 3)
2023	Farah Abadi and Jesper Rönndahl
2024	Carina Berg and Björn Gustafsson
2025	Edvin Törnblom and Kristina "Keyyo" Petrushina
2026	Gina Dirawi and Hampus Nessvold
2027	Björn Kjellman and Oscar Zia

== Presenters who formerly competed at Eurovision ==
Presenter	Participation year	Place	Points
Tommy Körberg	1969	9th	8
Tommy Körberg	1988	12th	52
Lasse Berghagen	1975	8th	72
Björn Skifs	1978	14th	26
Björn Skifs	1981	10th	50
Elisabeth Andreassen (part of Chips)	1982	8th	67
Carola Häggkvist	1983	3rd	126
Carola Häggkvist	1991	1st	146
Carola Häggkvist	2006	5th	170
Lasse Holm (with Monica Törnell)	1986	5th	78
Lotta Engberg	1987	12th	50
Jill Johnson	1998	10th	53
Charlotte Perrelli	1999	1st	163
Charlotte Perrelli	2008	18th	47
Lena Philipsson	2004	5th	170
Ola Salo (as member of The Ark)	2007	18th	51
Eric Saade	2011	3rd	185
Sanna Nielsen	2014	3rd	218
Måns Zelmerlöw	2015	1st	365

== Presenters who also presented Eurovision ==
Presenter	Year	Host city
Karin Falck	1975	Stockholm
Harald Treutiger	1992	Malmö
Kattis Ahlström	2000	Stockholm
Anders Lundin	2000	Stockholm
Petra Mede	2013	Malmö
Petra Mede	2016	Stockholm
Petra Mede	2024	Malmö
Måns Zelmerlöw	2016	Stockholm

== See also ==
- List of Eurovision Song Contest presenters
- List of Junior Eurovision Song Contest presenters
