= Sweden in the Eurovision Song Contest =

- Eurovision Song Contest
- Participating broadcaster: Sveriges Television (SVT; 1980–present) Formerly: Sveriges Radio (SR; 1958–1979)

Participation summary
- Appearances: 65 (64 finals)
- First appearance: 1958
- Highest placement: 1st: 1974, 1984, 1991, 1999, 2012, 2015, 2023
- Host: 1975, 1985, 1992, 2000, 2013, 2016, 2024
- Participation history: 1958; 1959; 1960; 1961; 1962; 1963; 1964; 1965; 1966; 1967; 1968; 1969; 1970; 1971; 1972; 1973; 1974; 1975; 1976; 1977; 1978; 1979; 1980; 1981; 1982; 1983; 1984; 1985; 1986; 1987; 1988; 1989; 1990; 1991; 1992; 1993; 1994; 1995; 1996; 1997; 1998; 1999; 2000; 2001; 2002; 2003; 2004; 2005; 2006; 2007; 2008; 2009; 2010; 2011; 2012; 2013; 2014; 2015; 2016; 2017; 2018; 2019; ~~2020~~; 2021; 2022; 2023; 2024; 2025; 2026

Related articles
- Melodifestivalen

External links
- SVT official homepage
- Sweden's page at Eurovision.com
- For the most recent participation see Sweden in the Eurovision Song Contest 2026

Sweden has been represented at the Eurovision Song Contest 65 times since making its debut in 1958, missing only three contests since then (1964, 1970, and 1976). The current Swedish participating broadcaster in the contest is Sveriges Television (SVT), which select its entrant through the national competition Melodifestivalen. Sweden has hosted the contest seven times: three times in Stockholm (1975, 2000, 2016), three times in Malmö (1992, 2013, 2024) and one time in Gothenburg (1985). At the 1997 contest, Sweden was one of the first five countries to adopt televoting.

Sweden, along with Ireland, is the most successful country in the Eurovision Song Contest, with a total of seven victories. Sweden also has the most top-five results of the 21st century, with 13; in total, Sweden has achieved 27 top-five results in the contest. After finishing second with "Nygammal vals" performed by Lill Lindfors and Svante Thuresson in 1966, Sweden went on to achieve its seven victories with "Waterloo" by ABBA (1974), "Diggi-Loo Diggi-Ley" by Herreys (1984), "Fångad av en stormvind" by Carola (1991), "Take Me to Your Heaven" by Charlotte Nilsson (1999), "Euphoria" by Loreen (2012), "Heroes" by Måns Zelmerlöw (2015), and "Tattoo" by Loreen (2023).

== Participation ==
Sveriges Radio (SR) is a full member of the European Broadcasting Union (EBU), thus eligible to participate in the Eurovision Song Contest. It participated in the contest representing Sweden from 1958 to 1979. A restructuring in July 1979 saw the creation of SR's television subsidiary Sveriges Television (SVT), which has participated for Sweden since 1980.

== History ==
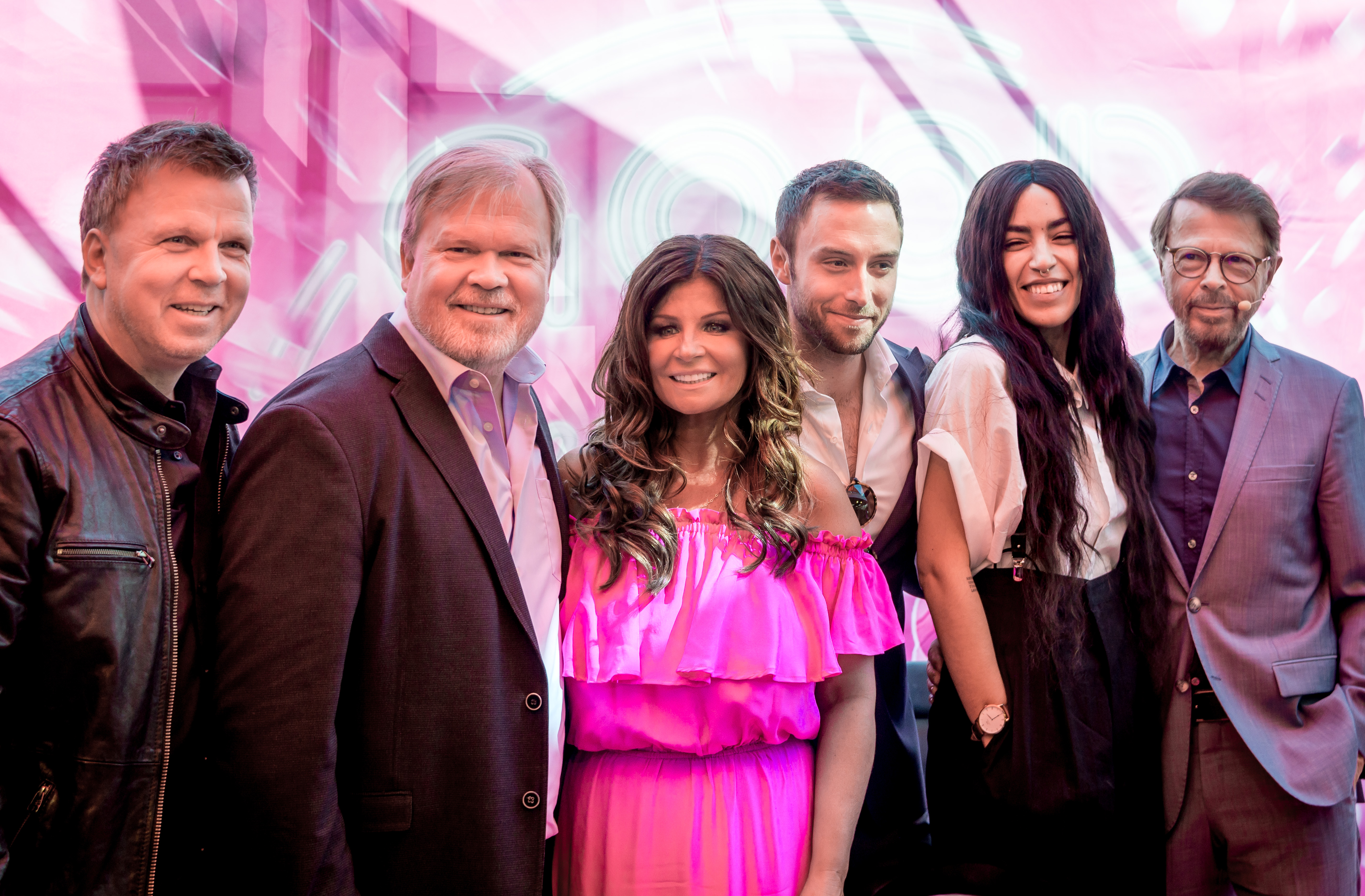
Swedish winners of the Eurovision Song Contest, from left to right: Richard and Per Herrey of Herreys (1984), Carola (1991), Måns Zelmerlöw (2015), Loreen (2012 and 2023) and Björn Ulvaeus of ABBA (1974)

Sweden's first entrant in the contest was "Lilla stjärna" performed by Alice Babs in 1958, who placed fourth. This remained the country's best result until 1966, when "Nygammal vals" by Lill Lindfors and Svante Thuresson came second.

Sweden's first Eurovision victory was in 1974 with the song "Waterloo", performed by ABBA. Following their victory in Brighton, ABBA went on to gain worldwide success and become one of the best-selling pop groups of all time. In the 1980s, Sweden achieved three successive top three results. After "Främling" by Carola finished third in 1983, "Diggi-Loo Diggi-Ley" by the Herreys gave Sweden its second victory in 1984. "Bra vibrationer" by Kikki Danielsson then finished third in 1985. Carola returned to the contest in 1991, eventually giving Sweden its third win with "Fångad av en stormvind", defeating France in a tie-break. "Take Me to Your Heaven" by Charlotte Nilsson gave the country a second win of the decade in 1999. The 1990s also saw two third-place results, for Jan Johansen in 1995 and One More Time in 1996. In the 2000s, the best Swedish result was fifth place, which it achieved four times, with Friends in 2001, Fame in 2003, Lena Philipsson in 2004 and Carola, who in 2006, became the only Swedish performer to achieve three top-five results. Together with Croatia and Malta, Sweden was one of only three countries to have never been relegated under the pre-2004 rules of the contest.

With the exception of 2006, Sweden endured a poor run of results from 2005 to 2009, placing no higher than 18th. The low point came in 2010, when Anna Bergendahl became the first Swedish entrant to fail to qualify for the final, finishing 11th in the semi-final (in 2008, Charlotte Perrelli finished 12th in the semi-final but was the back-up jury qualifier). Since then, the country has been successful, finishing in the top ten in all subsequent editions except three (14th place in 2013 and 2021, and 20th place in 2026). This includes a fifth victory courtesy of "Euphoria" by Loreen in 2012, a sixth victory courtesy of "Heroes" by Måns Zelmerlöw in 2015, and a seventh victory courtesy of "Tattoo" by Loreen in 2023. With her 2023 win, Loreen also became the second performer, as well as the first female artist, to win the contest more than once. Additional top-five placements during this period were third places in 2011 and 2014, fourth places in 2022 and 2025, and fifth places in 2016, 2017, and 2019.

=== Melodifestivalen ===
To choose its entrant for the Eurovision Song Contest, SR and SVT have organised an annual music competition known since 1967 as Melodifestivalen. It is one of Sweden's most popular television shows, and it has been estimated that more than four million Swedes watch the show annually. All of Sweden's entries for Eurovision have been selected through Melodifestivalen, with the exception of its first entry in 1958, which was internally selected by SR.

== Participation overview ==
Table key
1	First place
2	Second place
3	Third place
◁	Last place
◇	Entry selected but did not compete
†	Upcoming event

Year	Artist	Song	Language	Final	Points	Semi	Points
1958	Alice Babs	"Lilla stjärna"	Swedish	4	10	No semi-finals	
1959	Brita Borg	"Augustin"	Swedish	9	4	No semi-finals	
1960	Siw Malmkvist	"Alla andra får varann"	Swedish	10	4	No semi-finals	
1961	Lill-Babs	"April, april"	Swedish	14	2	No semi-finals	
1962	Inger Berggren	"Sol och vår"	Swedish	7	4	No semi-finals	
1963	Monica Zetterlund	"En gång i Stockholm"	Swedish	13 ◁	0	No semi-finals	
1965	Ingvar Wixell	"Absent Friend"	English	10	6	No semi-finals	
1966	Lill Lindfors and Svante Thuresson	"Nygammal vals"	Swedish	2	16	No semi-finals	
1967	Östen Warnerbring	"Som en dröm"	Swedish	8	7	No semi-finals	
1968	Claes-Göran Hederström	"Det börjar verka kärlek, banne mej"	Swedish	5	15	No semi-finals	
1969	Tommy Körberg	"Judy, min vän"	Swedish	9	8	No semi-finals	
1971	Family Four	"Vita vidder"	Swedish	6	85	No semi-finals	
1972	Family Four	"Härliga sommardag"	Swedish	13	75	No semi-finals	
1973	The Nova	"You're Summer"	English	5	94	No semi-finals	
1974	ABBA	"Waterloo"	English	1	24	No semi-finals	
1975	Lars Berghagen	"Jennie, Jennie"	English	8	72	No semi-finals	
1977	Forbes	"Beatles"	Swedish	18 ◁	2	No semi-finals	
1978	Björn Skifs	"Det blir alltid värre framåt natten"	Swedish	14	26	No semi-finals	
1979	Ted Gärdestad	"Satellit"	Swedish	17	8	No semi-finals	
1980	Tomas Ledin	"Just nu"	Swedish	10	47	No semi-finals	
1981	Björn Skifs	"Fångad i en dröm"	Swedish	10	50	No semi-finals	
1982	Chips	"Dag efter dag"	Swedish	8	67	No semi-finals	
1983	Carola Häggkvist	"Främling"	Swedish	3	126	No semi-finals	
1984	Herreys	"Diggi-Loo Diggi-Ley"	Swedish	1	145	No semi-finals	
1985	Kikki Danielsson	"Bra vibrationer"	Swedish	3	103	No semi-finals	
1986	Lasse Holm and Monica Törnell	"E' de' det här du kallar kärlek"	Swedish	5	78	No semi-finals	
1987	Lotta Engberg	"Boogaloo"	Swedish	12	50	No semi-finals	
1988	Tommy Körberg	"Stad i ljus"	Swedish	12	52	No semi-finals	
1989	Tommy Nilsson	"En dag"	Swedish	4	110	No semi-finals	
1990	Edin-Ådahl	"Som en vind"	Swedish	16	24	No semi-finals	
1991	Carola	"Fångad av en stormvind"	Swedish	1	146	No semi-finals	
1992	Christer Björkman	"I morgon är en annan dag"	Swedish	22	9	No semi-finals	
1993	Arvingarna	"Eloise"	Swedish	7	89	Kvalifikacija za Millstreet	
1994	Marie Bergman and Roger Pontare	"Stjärnorna"	Swedish	13	48	No semi-finals	
1995	Jan Johansen	"Se på mig"	Swedish	3	100	No semi-finals	
1996	One More Time	"Den vilda"	Swedish	3	100	1	227
1997	Blond	"Bara hon älskar mig"	Swedish	14	36	No semi-finals	
1998	Jill Johnson	"Kärleken är"	Swedish	10	53	No semi-finals	
1999	Charlotte Nilsson	"Take Me to Your Heaven"	English	1	163	No semi-finals	
2000	Roger Pontare	"When Spirits Are Calling My Name"	English	7	88	No semi-finals	
2001	Friends	"Listen to Your Heartbeat"	English	5	100	No semi-finals	
2002	Afro-dite	"Never Let It Go"	English	8	72	No semi-finals	
2003	Fame	"Give Me Your Love"	English	5	107	No semi-finals	
2004	Lena Philipsson	"It Hurts"	English	5	170	Top 11 in 2003 contest (Note: According to the then-Eurovision rules, the top ten non-Big Four countries from the previous year along with the Big Four automatically qualified for the Grand Final without having to compete in semi-finals. For example, if Germany and France placed inside the top ten, the 11th and 12th spots were advanced to next year's Grand Final along with all countries ranked in the top ten.)	
2005	Martin Stenmarck	"Las Vegas"	English	19	30	Top 12 in 2004 final	
2006	Carola	"Invincible"	English	5	170	4	214
2007	The Ark	"The Worrying Kind"	English	18	51	Top 10 in 2006 final	
2008	Charlotte Perrelli	"Hero"	English	18	47	12 (Note: Qualified through the back-up jury selection)	54
2009	Malena Ernman	"La voix"	English, French	21	33	4	105
2010	Anna Bergendahl	"This Is My Life"	English	Failed to qualify		11	62
2011	Eric Saade	"Popular"	English	3	185	1	155
2012	Loreen	"Euphoria"	English	1	372	1	181
2013	Robin Stjernberg	"You"	English	14	62	Host country	
2014	Sanna Nielsen	"Undo"	English	3	218	2	131
2015	Måns Zelmerlöw	"Heroes"	English	1	365	1	217
2016	Frans	"If I Were Sorry"	English	5	261	Host country	
2017	Robin Bengtsson	"I Can't Go On"	English	5	344	3	227
2018	Benjamin Ingrosso	"Dance You Off"	English	7	274	2	254
2019	John Lundvik	"Too Late for Love"	English	5	334	3	238
2020	The Mamas ◇	"Move" ◇	English ◇	Contest cancelled (Note: The 2020 contest was cancelled due to the COVID-19 pandemic.)			
2021	Tusse	"Voices"	English	14	109	7	142
2022	Cornelia Jakobs	"Hold Me Closer"	English	4	438	1	396
2023	Loreen	"Tattoo"	English	1	583	2	135
2024	Marcus & Martinus	"Unforgettable"	English	9	174	Host country	
2025	KAJ	"Bara bada bastu"	Swedish (Note: Specifically the Vörå dialect, an Ostrobothinan variety of Finland Swedish)	4	321	4	118
2026	Felicia	"My System"	English	20	51	9	96
2027	Confirmed intention to participate †						

=== Congratulations: 50 Years of the Eurovision Song Contest ===
Artist	Song	Language	At Congratulations				At Eurovision		
Artist	Song	Language	Final	Points	Semi	Points	Year	Place	Points
ABBA	"Waterloo"	English	1	329	1	331	1974	1	24

== Hostings ==
Year	Location	Venue	Executive producer	Director	Musical director	Presenter(s)	Ref.
1975	Stockholm	Stockholmsmässan	Roland Eiworth	Bo Billtén	Mats Olsson	Karin Falck	
1985	Gothenburg	Scandinavium	Steen Priwin		Curt-Eric Holmquist	Lill Lindfors	
1992	Malmö	Malmö Isstadion	Ingvar Ernblad	Kåge Gimtell	Anders Berglund	Lydia Capolicchio and Harald Treutiger	
2000	Stockholm	Globe Arena	Svante Stockselius	Mattias Bratten	—N/a	Kattis Ahlström and Anders Lundin	
2013	Malmö	Malmö Arena	Martin Österdahl	Daniel Jelinek, Robin Hofwander and Sven Stojanović	—N/a	Petra Mede	
2016	Stockholm	Globe Arena	Johan Bernhagen and Martin Österdahl	Daniel Jelinek and Robin Hofwander	—N/a	Petra Mede and Måns Zelmerlöw	
2024	Malmö	Malmö Arena	Ebba Adielsson and Christel Tholse Willers	Robin Hofwander, Daniel Jelinek and Fredrik Bäcklund	—N/a	Petra Mede and Malin Åkerman	

== Awards ==
=== Marcel Bezençon Awards ===
Year	Category	Song	Performer	Composer(s) lyrics (l) / music (m)	Final result	Points	Host city	Ref.
2002	Artistic Award (Note: Voted by previous winners.)	"Never Let It Go"	Afro-dite	Marcos Ubeda	8	72	(Estonia) Tallinn	
2006	Artistic Award	"Invincible"	Carola	Thomas G:son, Bobby Ljunggren, Henrik Wikström, Carola	5	170	(Greece) Athens	
2012	Artistic Award (Note: Voted by commentators.)	"Euphoria"	Loreen	Thomas G:son, Peter Boström	1	372	(Azerbaijan) Baku	
2012	Composer Award	"Euphoria"	Loreen	Thomas G:son, Peter Boström	1	372	(Azerbaijan) Baku	
2013	Composer Award	"You"	Robin Stjernberg	Robin Stjernberg, Linnea Deb, Joy Deb, Joakim Harestad Haukaas	14	62	(Sweden) Malmö	
2015	Artistic Award	"Heroes"	Måns Zelmerlöw	Anton Malmberg Hård af Segerstad, Joy Deb, Linnea Deb	1	365	(Austria) Vienna	
2022	Composer Award	"Hold Me Closer"	Cornelia Jakobs	Cornelia Jakobsdotter, Isa Molin, David Zandén	4	438	(Italy) Turin	
2023	Artistic Award	"Tattoo"	Loreen	Jimmy "Joker" Thörnfeldt, Jimmy Jansson, Lorine Talhaoui, Moa Carlebecker, Peter Boström, Thomas G:son	1	583	(United Kingdom) Liverpool	
2023	Press Award	"Tattoo"	Loreen	Jimmy "Joker" Thörnfeldt, Jimmy Jansson, Lorine Talhaoui, Moa Carlebecker, Peter Boström, Thomas G:son	1	583	(United Kingdom) Liverpool	

=== Winners by OGAE members ===
Year	Song	Performer	Final result	Points	Host city	Ref.
2008	"Hero"	Charlotte Perrelli	18	47	(Serbia) Belgrade	
2012	"Euphoria"	Loreen	1	372	(Azerbaijan) Baku	
2014	"Undo"	Sanna Nielsen	3	218	(Denmark) Copenhagen	
2022	"Hold Me Closer"	Cornelia Jakobs	4	438	(Italy) Turin	
2023	"Tattoo"	Loreen	1	583	(United Kingdom) Liverpool	
2025	"Bara bada bastu"	KAJ	4	321	(Switzerland) Basel	

== Related involvement ==
=== Conductors ===
Year	Eurovision conductor (Note: All conductors are of Swedish nationality unless otherwise noted.)	Melodifestivalen conductor	Notes	Ref.
1958	(Netherlands) Dolf van der Linden	No national final held	Host conductor	
1959	(France) Franck Pourcel	Thore Ehrling	Host conductor	
1960	Thore Ehrling			
1961	William Lind			
1962	Egon Kjerrman			
1963	William Lind			
1965	William Lind			
1966	Gert-Ove Andersson			
1967	Mats Olsson			
1968	Mats Olsson			
1969	Lars Samuelson			
1971	Claes Rosendahl			
1972	Mats Olsson			
1973	Monica Dominique			
1974	Sven-Olof Walldoff			
1975	Lars Samuelson			
1977	Anders Berglund			
1978	Bengt Palmers			
1979	Lars Samuelson			
1980	Anders Berglund			
1981	Anders Berglund			
1982	Anders Berglund			
1983	Anders Ekdahl			
1984	Curt-Eric Holmquist			
1985	Curt-Eric Holmquist	—N/a (Note: That year's Swedish national final was presented without an orchestra to save money for the international contest.)	(Note: Also conducted the Belgian entry)	
1986	Anders Berglund	N/A (Note: That year's Swedish national final had the entries presented as music videos, so there was no orchestra present.)		
1987	Curt-Eric Holmquist			
1988	Anders Berglund			
1989	Anders Berglund			
1990	Curt-Eric Holmquist			
1991	Anders Berglund			
1992	Anders Berglund		(Note: Berglund also conducted and played accordion for the Yugoslav entry; he re-arranged the French entry as well when the submitted sheet music was deemed too difficult to follow.)	
1993	Curt-Eric Holmquist			
1994	Anders Berglund			
1995	Anders Berglund			
1996	Anders Berglund			
1997	Curt-Eric Holmquist			
1998	Anders Berglund			
1999	No orchestra	Anders Berglund		
2000	No orchestra	Curt-Eric Holmquist		

=== Heads of delegation ===
Each participating broadcaster in the Eurovision Song Contest assigns a head of delegation as the EBU's contact person and the leader of their delegation at the event. The delegation, whose size can greatly vary, includes a head of press, the performers, songwriters, composers, and backing vocalists, among others.

Year	Head of delegation	Ref.
2013	Rennie Mirro	
2015	Christer Björkman	
2016	Mari Ryberger	
2018	Christer Björkman	
2021	Lotta Furebäck	

=== Commentators and spokespersons ===
Over the years Swedish commentary has been provided by several experienced radio and television presenters, including Jacob Dahlin, Ulf Elfving, Harald Treutiger, Pekka Heino, Kristian Luuk, and Fredrik Belfrage. Since 2009 (with the exceptions of 2013 and 2016), Edward af Sillén provided the SVT commentary alongside various dual commentators.

Year	Television commentator	Radio commentator	Spokesperson	Ref.
1957	Nils Linnman	No radio broadcast	Did not participate	
1958	Jan Gabrielsson	Same as television broadcast	Tage Danielsson	
1959	Jan Gabrielsson	Same as television broadcast	Roland Eiworth	
1960	Jan Gabrielsson	Same as television broadcast	Tage Danielsson	
1961	Jan Gabrielsson	Same as television broadcast	Roland Eiworth	
1962	Jan Gabrielsson	Same as television broadcast	Tage Danielsson	
1963	Jörgen Cederberg	Same as television broadcast	Edvard Matz	
1964	Sven Lindahl	Same as television broadcast	Did not participate	
1965	Berndt Friberg	Same as television broadcast	Edvard Matz	
1966	Sven Lindahl	Same as television broadcast	Edvard Matz	
1967	Christina Hansegård	Same as television broadcast	Edvard Matz	
1968	Christina Hansegård	Same as television broadcast	Edvard Matz	
1969	Christina Hansegård	Same as television broadcast	Edvard Matz	
1970	No television broadcast	No radio broadcast	Did not participate	
1971	Åke Strömmer	Ursula Richter	No spokesperson	
1972	Bo Billtén	Björn Bjelfvenstam	No spokesperson	
1973	Alicia Lundberg	Ursula Richter	No spokesperson	
1974	Johan Sandström	Ursula Richter	Sven Lindahl	
1975	Åke Strömmer	Ursula Richter	Sven Lindahl	
1976	No television broadcast	Ursula Richter	Did not participate	
1977	Ulf Elfving	Åke Strömmer, Ursula Richter	Sven Lindahl	
1978	Ulf Elfving	Kent Finell	Sven Lindahl	
1979	Ulf Elfving	Kent Finell	Sven Lindahl	
1980	Ulf Elfving	Kent Finell	Arne Weise	
1981	Ulf Elfving	No radio broadcast	Bengteric Nordell	
1982	Ulf Elfving	Kent Finell	Arne Weise	
1983	Ulf Elfving	Kent Finell	Agneta Bolme-Börjefors	
1984	Fredrik Belfrage	No radio broadcast	Agneta Bolme-Börjefors	
1985	Fredrik Belfrage	Jan Ellerås, Rune Hallberg	Agneta Bolme-Börjefors	
1986	Ulf Elfving	Jacob Dahlin	Agneta Bolme-Börjefors	
1987	Fredrik Belfrage	Jacob Dahlin	Jan Ellerås	
1988	Bengt Grafström	Kalle Oldby	Maud Uppling	
1989	Jacob Dahlin	Kent Finell, Janeric Sundquist	Agneta Bolme-Börjefors	
1990	Jan Jingryd	Kersti Adams-Ray	Jan Ellerås	
1991	Harald Treutiger	Kalle Oldby, Runne Hallberg	Bo Hagström	
1992	Björn Kjellman, Jesper Aspegren	Kalle Oldby, Lotta Engberg	Jan Jingryd	
1993	Jan Jingryd, Kåge Gimtell	Susan Seidemar, Claes-Johan Larsson	Gösta Hanson	
1994	Pekka Heino	Claes-Johan Larsson, Lisa Syrén	Marianne Anderberg	
1995	Pernilla Månsson, Kåge Gimtell	Claes-Johan Larsson, Lisa Syrén	Björn Hedman	
1996	Björn Kjellman	Claes-Johan Larsson, Lisa Syrén	Ulla Rundqvist	
1997	Jan Jingryd	Claes-Johan Larsson, Lisa Syrén	Gösta Hanson	
1998	Pernilla Månsson, Christer Björkman	Claes-Johan Larsson, Anna Hötzel	Björn Hedman	
1999	Pekka Heino, Anders Berglund	Carolina Norén	Pontus Gårdinger	
2000	Pernilla Månsson, Christer Lundh	Carolina Norén, Björn Kjellman	Malin Ekander	
2001	Henrik Olsson	Carolina Norén, Björn Kjellman	Josefine Sundström	
2002	Claes Åkesson, Christer Björkman	Carolina Norén, Björn Kjellman	Kristin Kaspersen	
2003	Pekka Heino	Carolina Norén, Björn Kjellman	Kattis Ahlström	
2004	Pekka Heino	Carolina Norén, Björn Kjellman	Jovan Radomir	
2005	Pekka Heino	Carolina Norén, Björn Kjellman	Annika Jankell	
2006	Pekka Heino	Carolina Norén, Björn Kjellman	Jovan Radomir	
2007	Kristian Luuk, Josef Sterzenbach	Carolina Norén, Björn Kjellman	André Pops	
2008	Kristian Luuk, Josef Sterzenbach	Carolina Norén, Björn Kjellman	Björn Gustafsson	
2009	Edward af Sillén, Shirley Clamp	Carolina Norén, Björn Kjellman	Sarah Dawn Finer	
2010	Edward af Sillén, Christine Meltzer	Carolina Norén, Björn Kjellman	Eric Saade	
2011	Edward af Sillén, Hélène Benno	Carolina Norén, Björn Kjellman	Danny Saucedo	
2012	Edward af Sillén, Gina Dirawi	Carolina Norén, Björn Kjellman	Sarah Dawn Finer (as Lynda Woodruff)	
2013	Josefine Sundström	Carolina Norén (all shows), Ronnie Ritterland (semifinals), Björn Kjellman (final)	Yohio	
2014	Edward af Sillén, Malin Olsson	Carolina Norén, Ronnie Ritterland	Alcazar	
2015	Edward af Sillén, Sanna Nielsen	Carolina Norén, Ronnie Ritterland	Mariette Hansson	
2016	Lotta Bromé	Carolina Norén, Björn Kjellman	Gina Dirawi	
2017	Edward af Sillén, Måns Zelmerlöw	Carolina Norén, Björn Kjellman, Ola Gäverth	Wiktoria	
2018	Edward af Sillén, Sanna Nielsen	Carolina Norén, Björn Kjellman	Felix Sandman	
2019	Edward af Sillén, Charlotte Perrelli	Carolina Norén, Björn Kjellman	Eric Saade	
2021	Edward af Sillén, Christer Björkman	Carolina Norén	Carola	
2022	Edward af Sillén (all shows), Linnea Henriksson (final)	Carolina Norén	Dotter	
2023	Edward af Sillén (all shows), Måns Zelmerlöw (final)	Carolina Norén	Farah Abadi	
2024	Edward af Sillén, Tina Mehrafzoon	Carolina Norén	Frans Jeppsson Wall	
2025	Edward af Sillén (all shows), Petra Mede (final)	Carolina Norén	Keyyo	
2026	Edward af Sillén	Carolina Norén	Jakob Norrgård	

==== Other shows ====
Show	Commentator	Channel	Ref.
Songs of Europe	Arne Weise	TV2	
Congratulations: 50 Years of the Eurovision Song Contest	Pekka Heino	SVT1	
Eurovision Song Contest's Greatest Hits	Sarah Dawn Finer, Christer Björkman	SVT1, SVT World	
Eurovision: Europe Shine a Light	No commentator	SVT1	

=== Stage directors ===
Year	Stage director	Ref.
2011	Fredrik "Benke" Rydman	
2012	Ambra Succi	
2013	Ambra Succi	
2014	Lotta Furebäck and Mari Ryberger	
2015	Fredrik "Benke" Rydman	
2016	Lotta Furebäck and Mari Ryberger	
2017	Zain Odelstål, Lotta Furebäck and Mari Ryberger	
2018	Dennis Brøchner and Zain Odelstål	
2019	Dennis Brøchner, Zain Odelstål, Lotta Furebäck and Sacha Jean-Baptiste	
2020	Zain Odelstål, Dennis Brøchner, Sacha Jean-Baptiste and Lotta Furebäck	
2021	Lotta Furebäck, Sacha Jean-Baptiste and Jennie Widegren	
2022	Sacha Jean-Baptiste, Lotta Furebäck, Jennie Widegren and Keisha von Arnold	
2023	Sacha Jean-Baptiste, Lotta Furebäck, Jennie Widegren and Keisha von Arnold	
2024	Sacha Jean-Baptiste, Lotta Furebäck, Jennie Widegren and Keisha von Arnold	
2025	Sacha Jean-Baptiste, Lotta Furebäck, Jennie Widegren and Keisha von Arnold	

=== Costume designers ===
Year	Costume designers	Ref.
2006	Lars Wallin	
2009	Camilla Thulin	
2023	Fadi El Khoury	

== Photo gallery ==
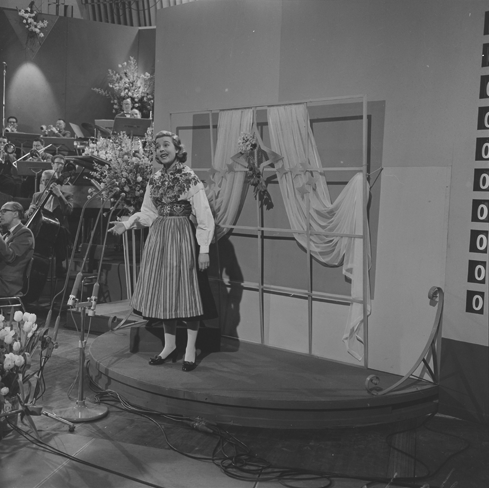
Alice Babs in Hilversum (1958)

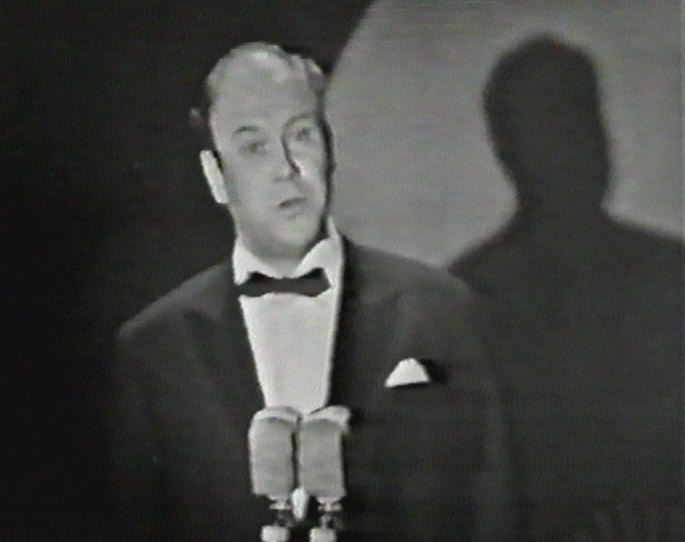
Ingvar Wixell in Naples (1965)

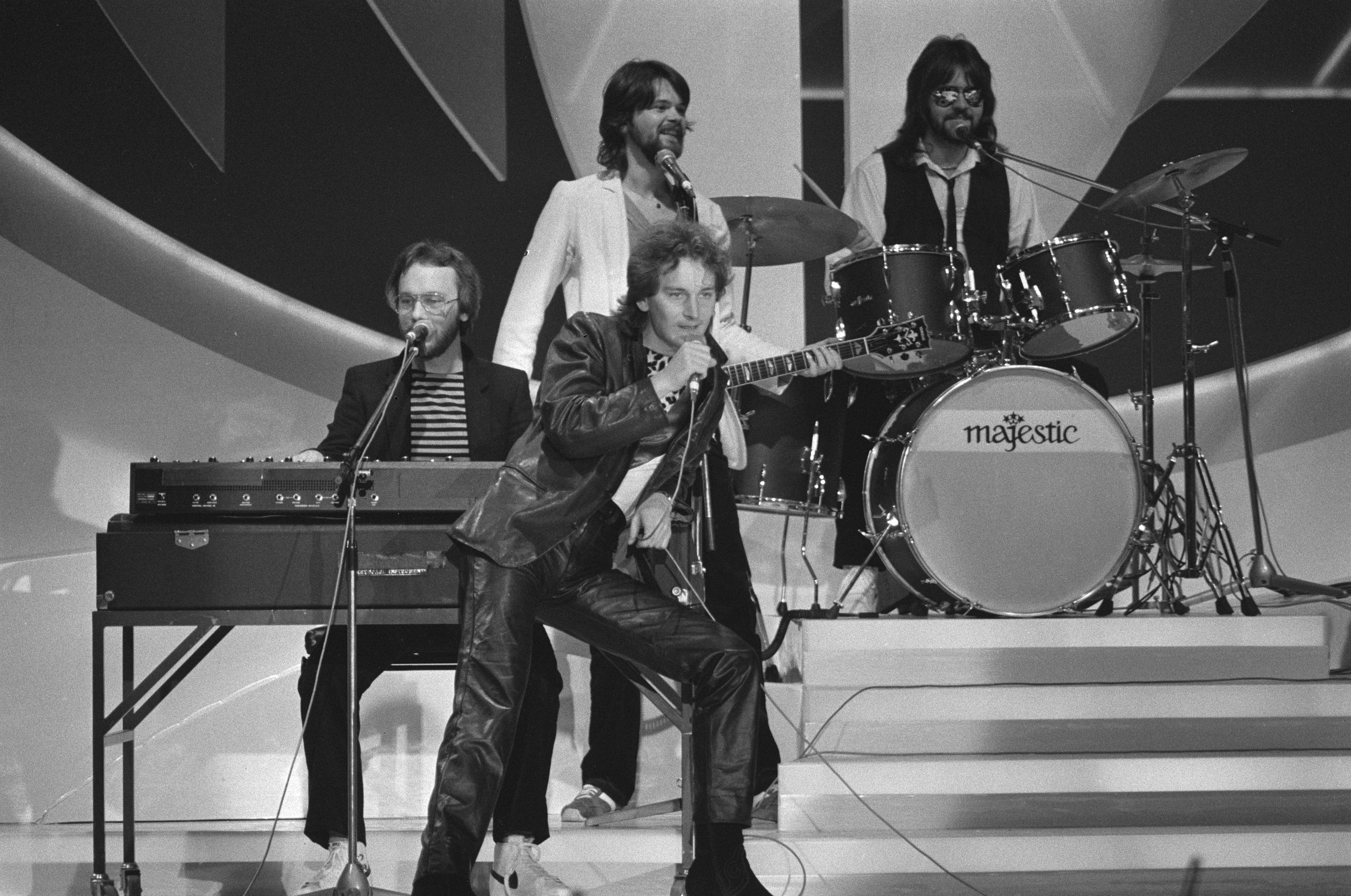
Tomas Ledin in The Hague (1980)

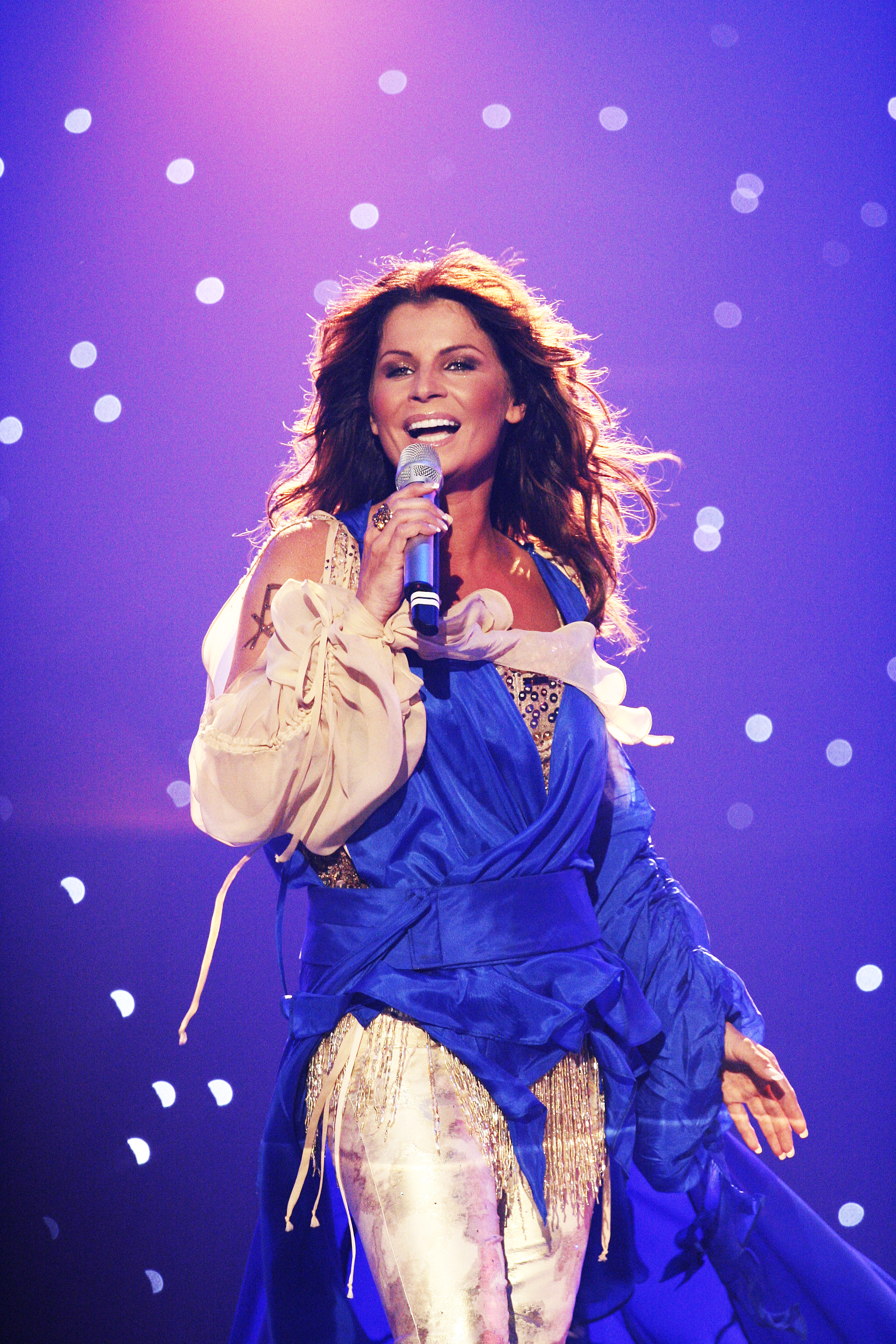
Carola in Athens (2006)

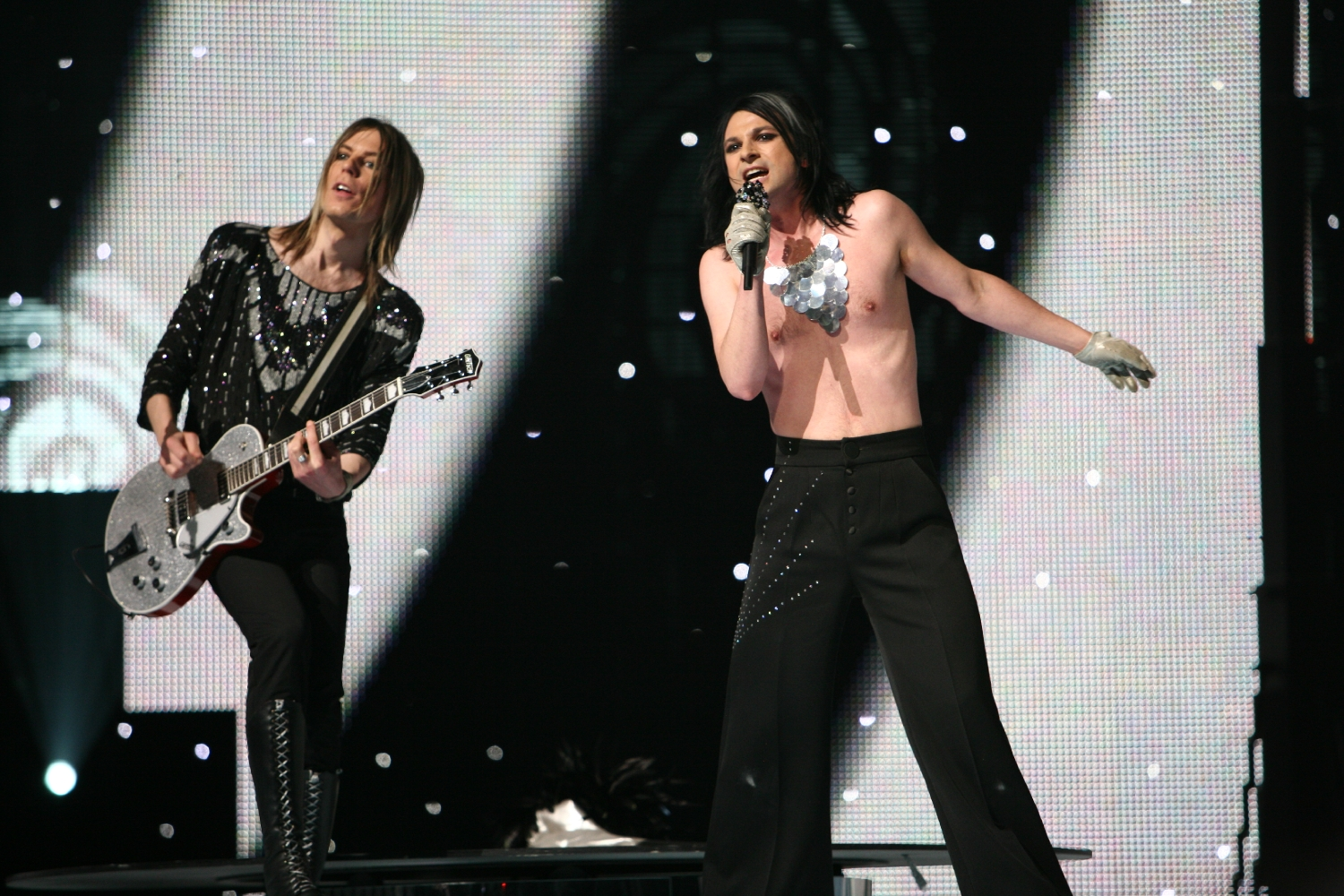
The Ark in Helsinki (2007)

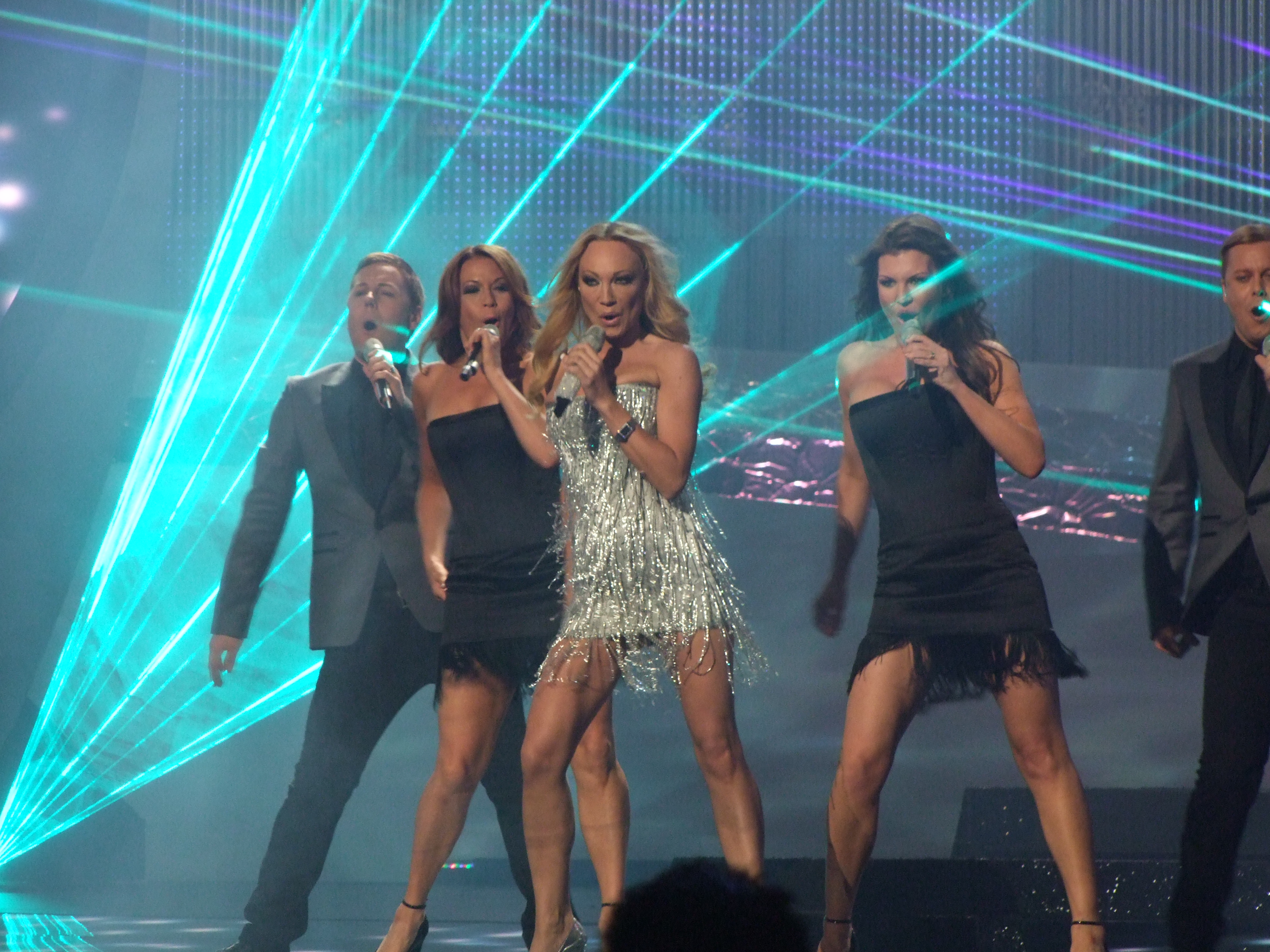
Charlotte Perrelli in Belgrade (2008)

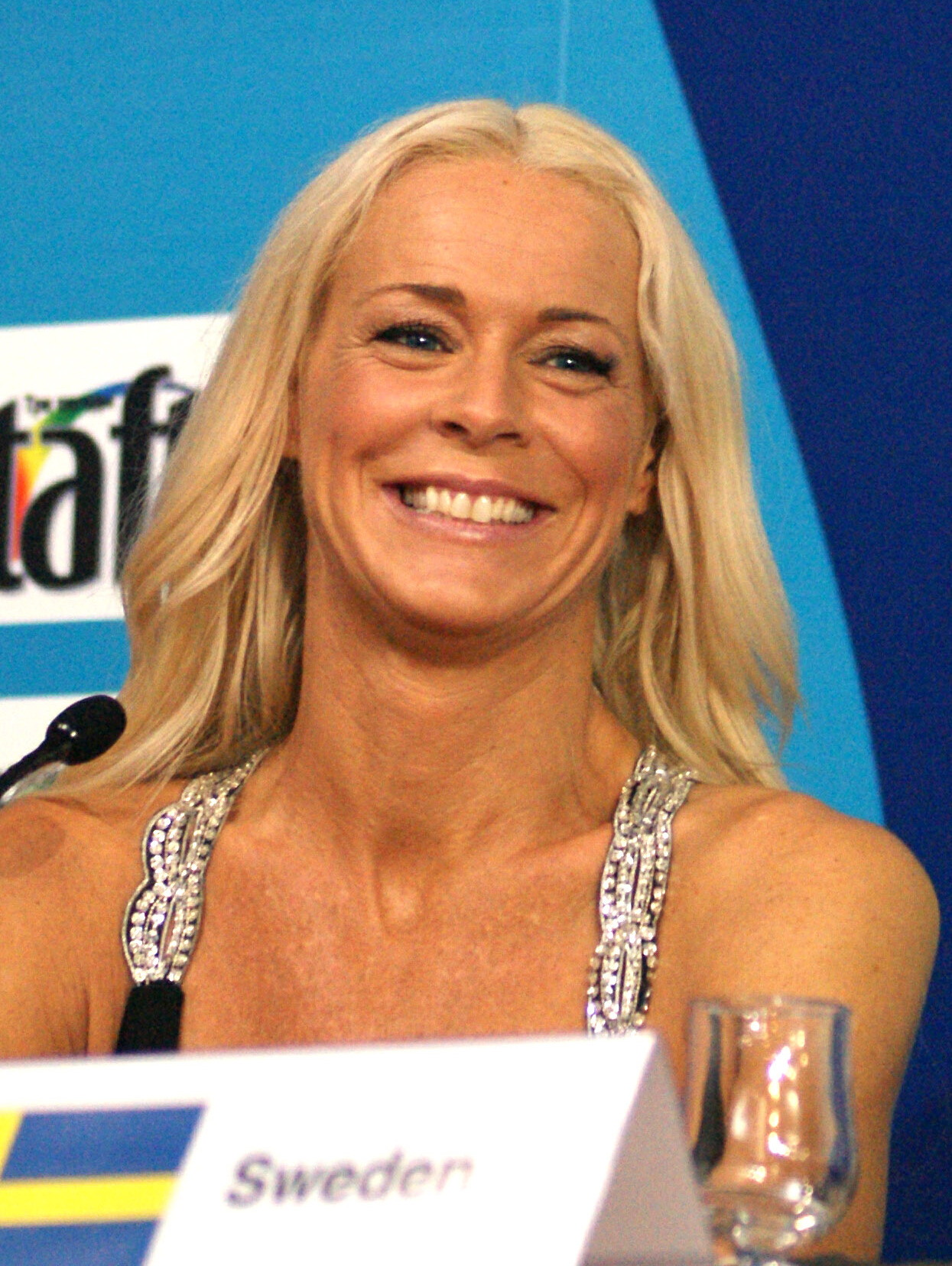
Malena Ernman in Moscow (2009)

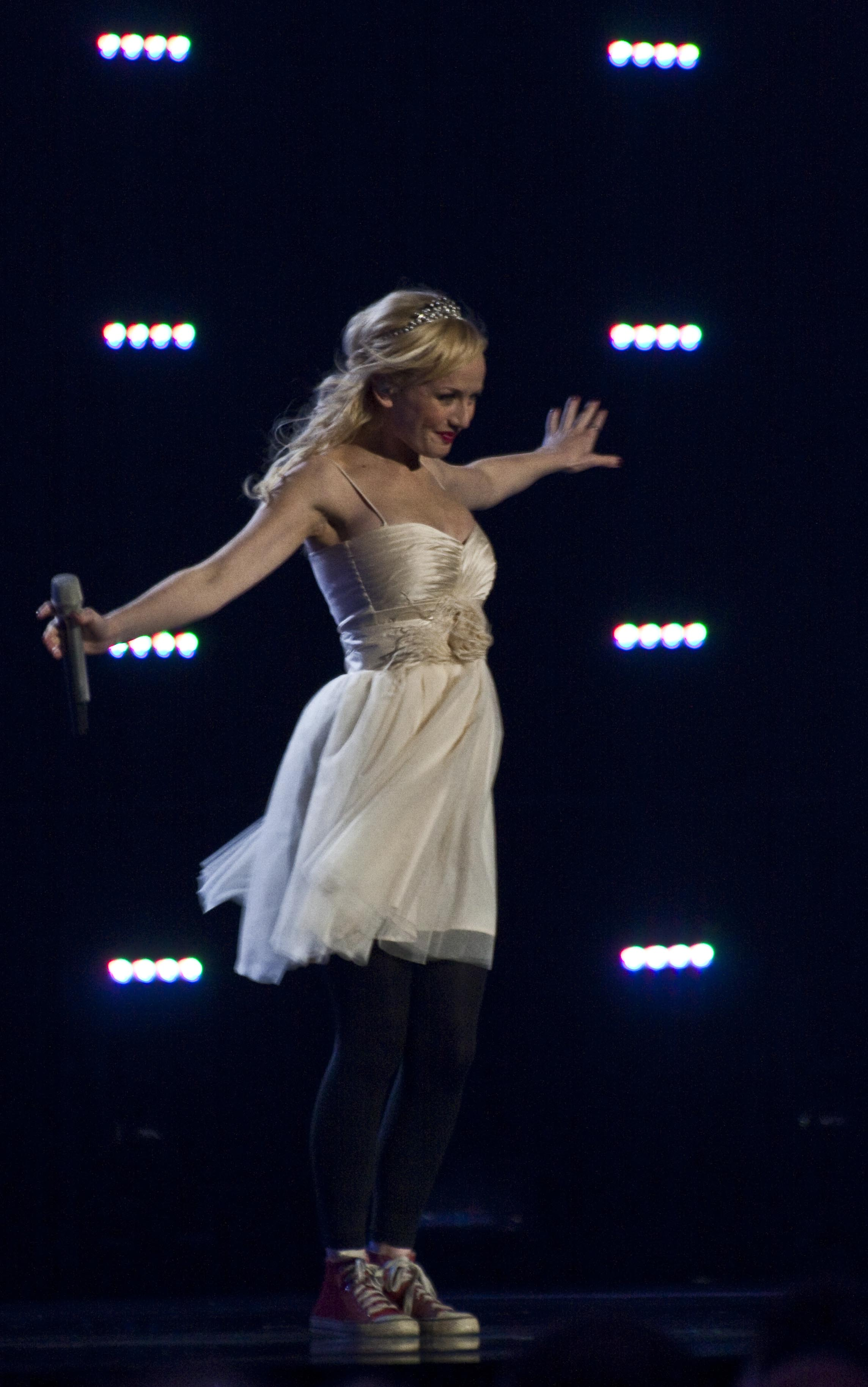
Anna Bergendahl in Oslo (2010)

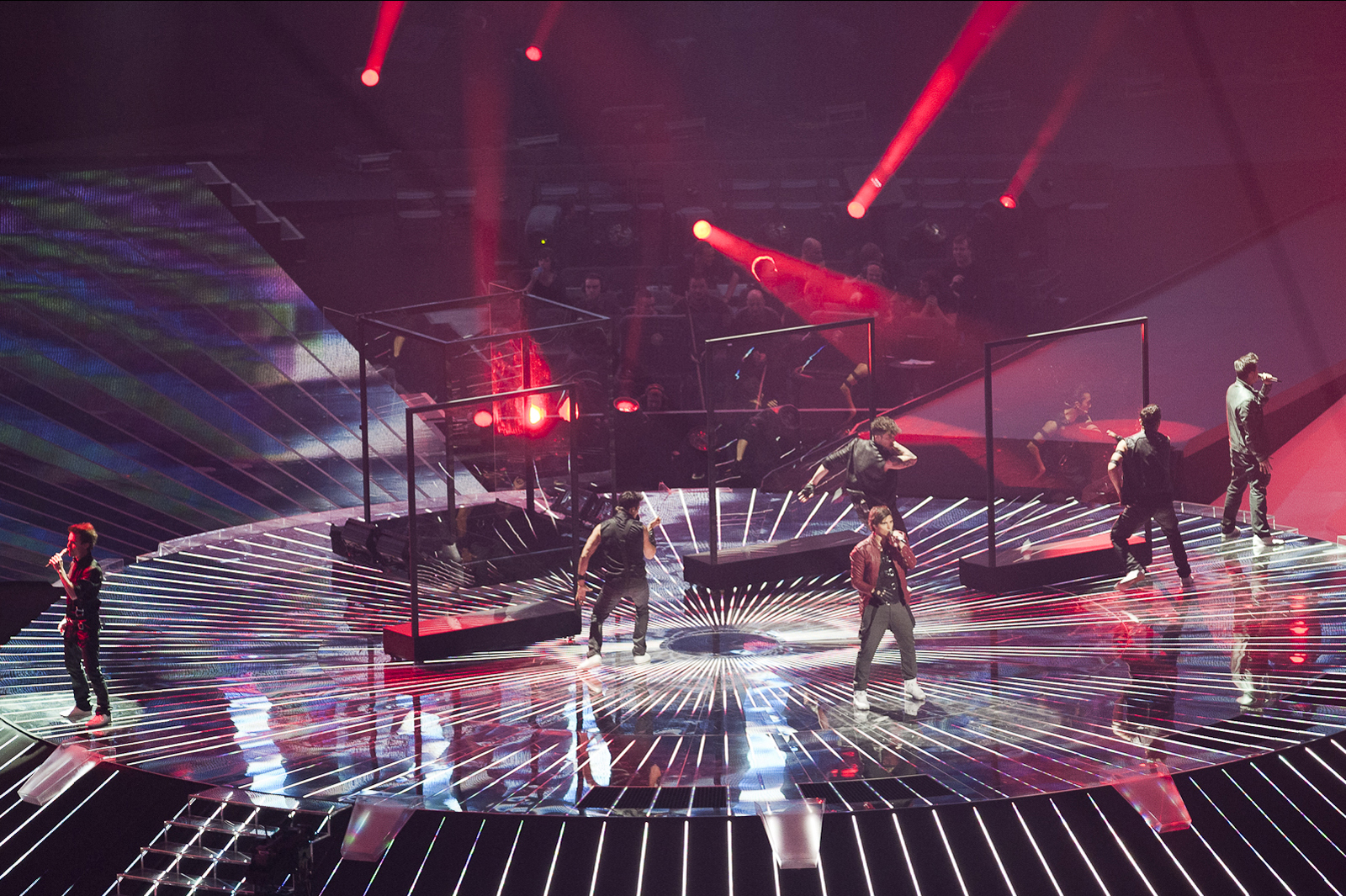
Eric Saade in Düsseldorf (2011)

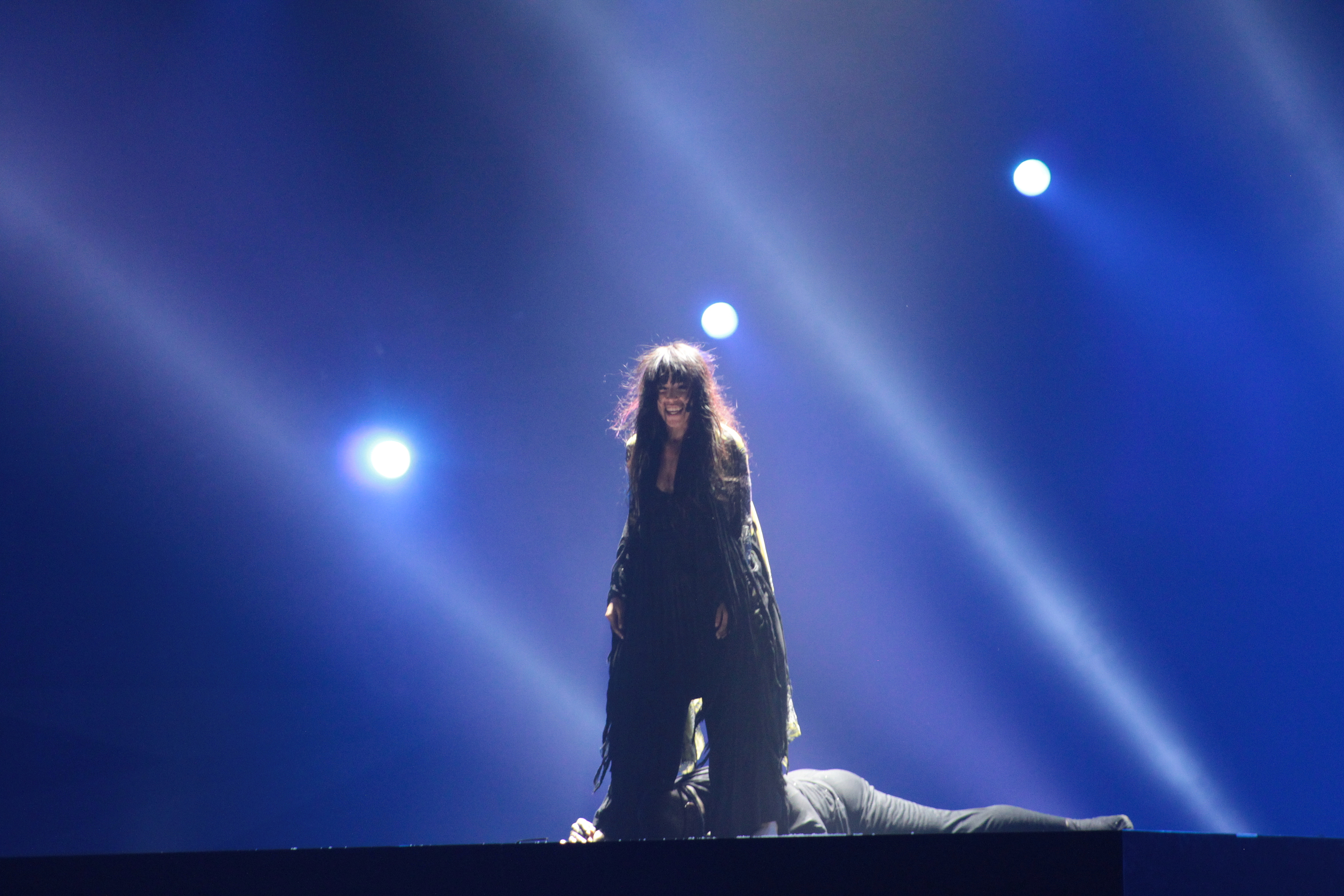
Loreen in Baku (2012)

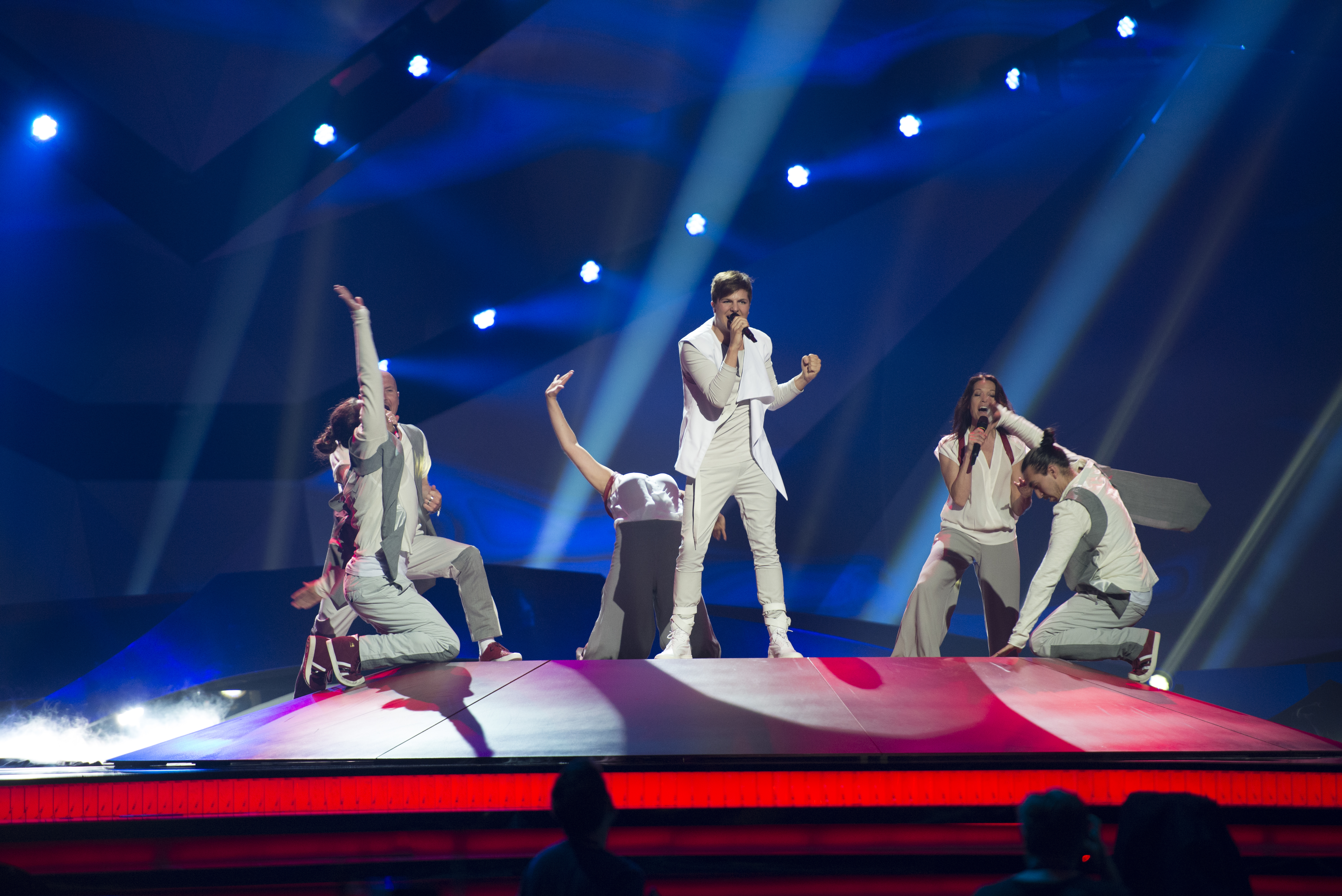
Robin Stjernberg in Malmö (2013)

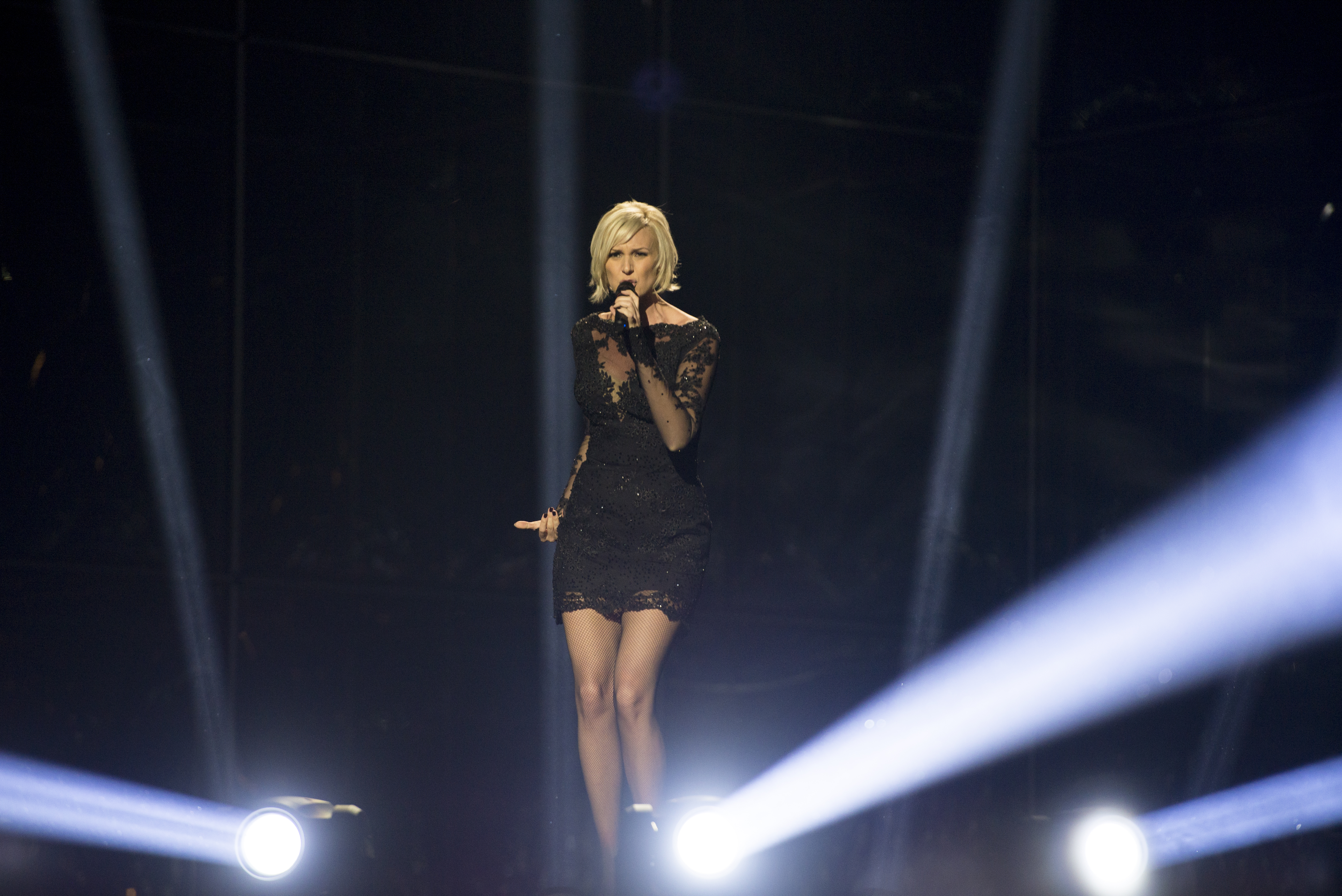
Sanna Nielsen in Copenhagen (2014)

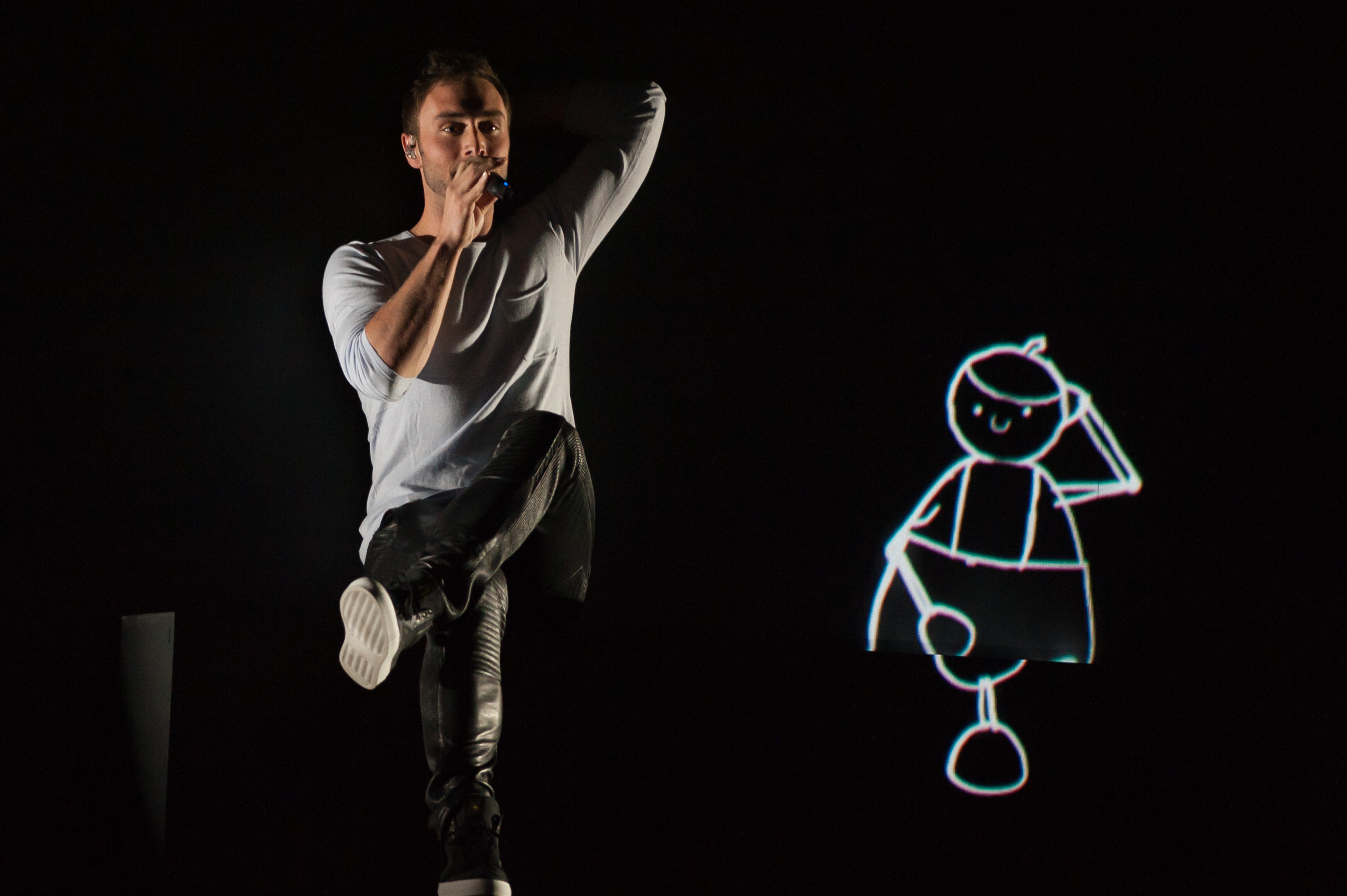
Måns Zelmerlöw in Vienna (2015)

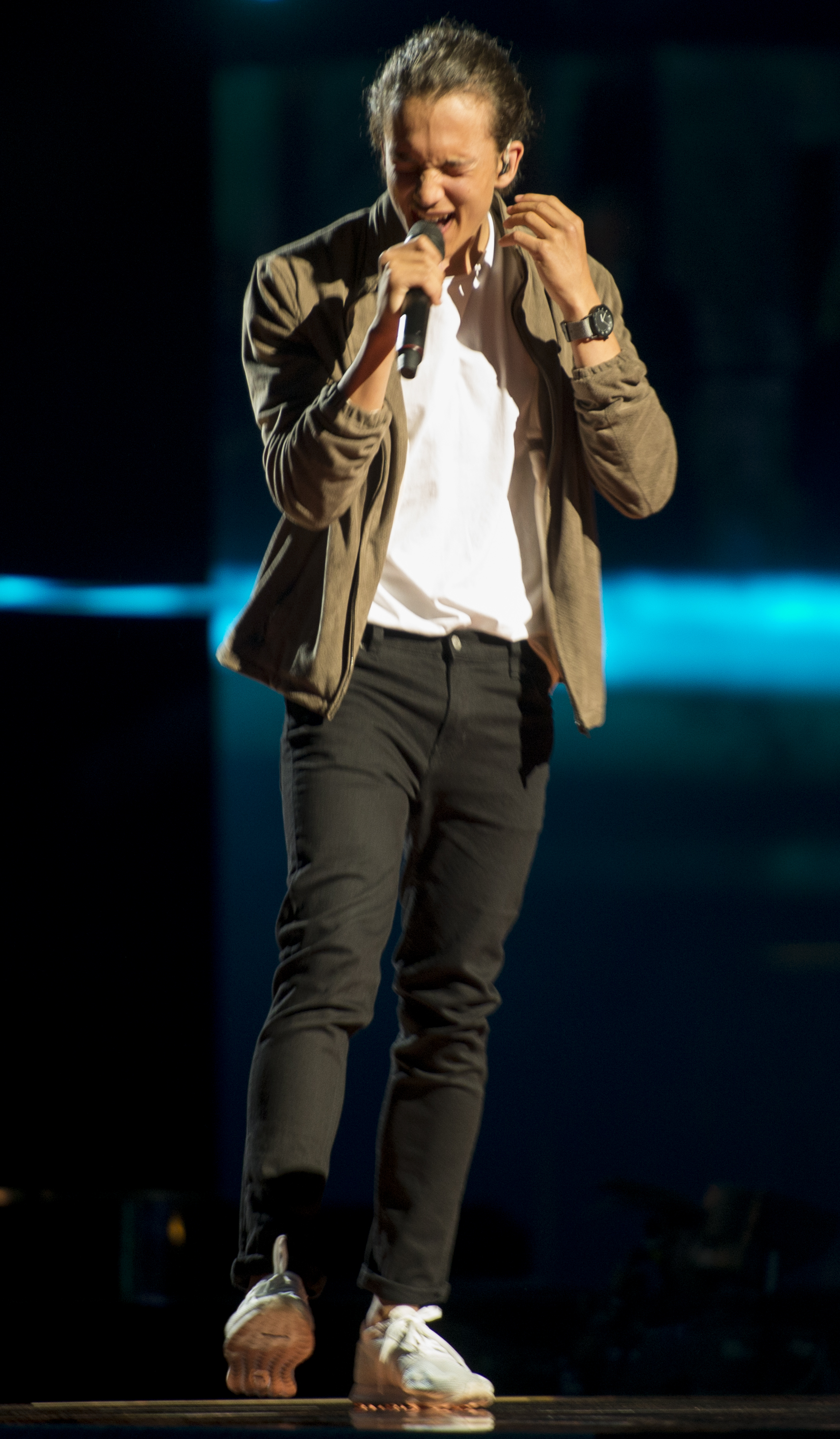
Frans in Stockholm (2016)

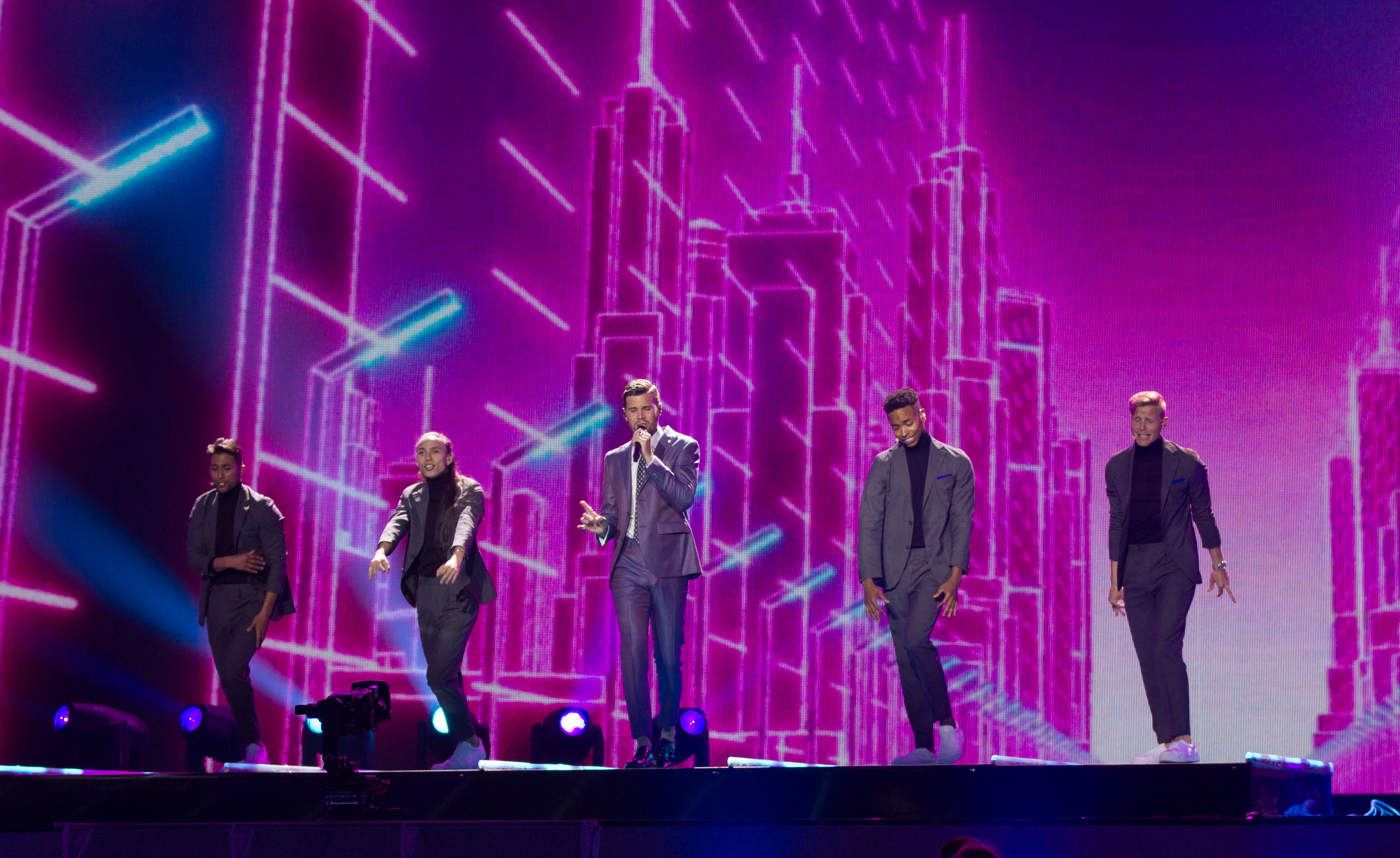
Robin Bengtsson in Kyiv (2017)

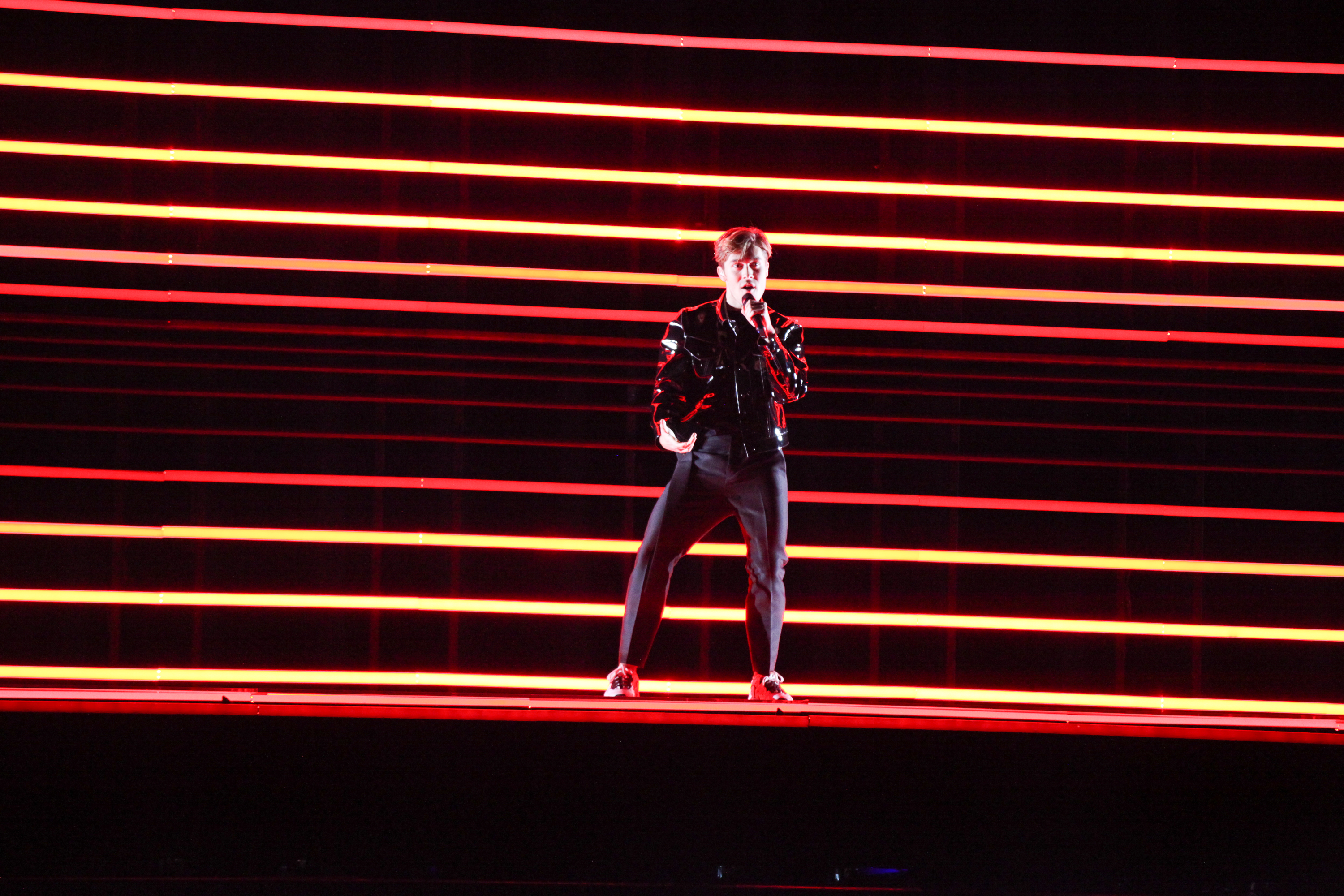
Benjamin Ingrosso in Lisbon (2018)

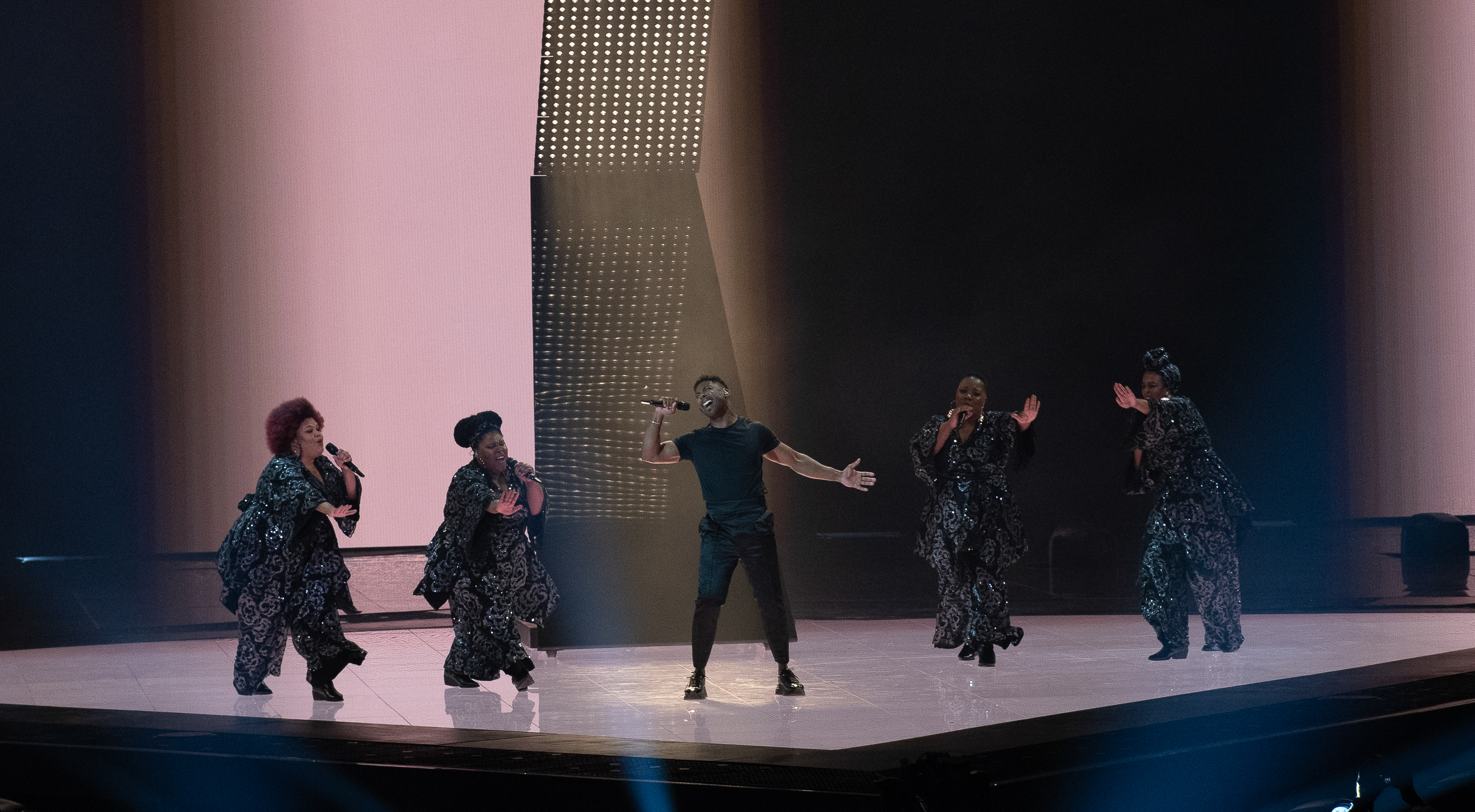
John Lundvik in Tel Aviv (2019)

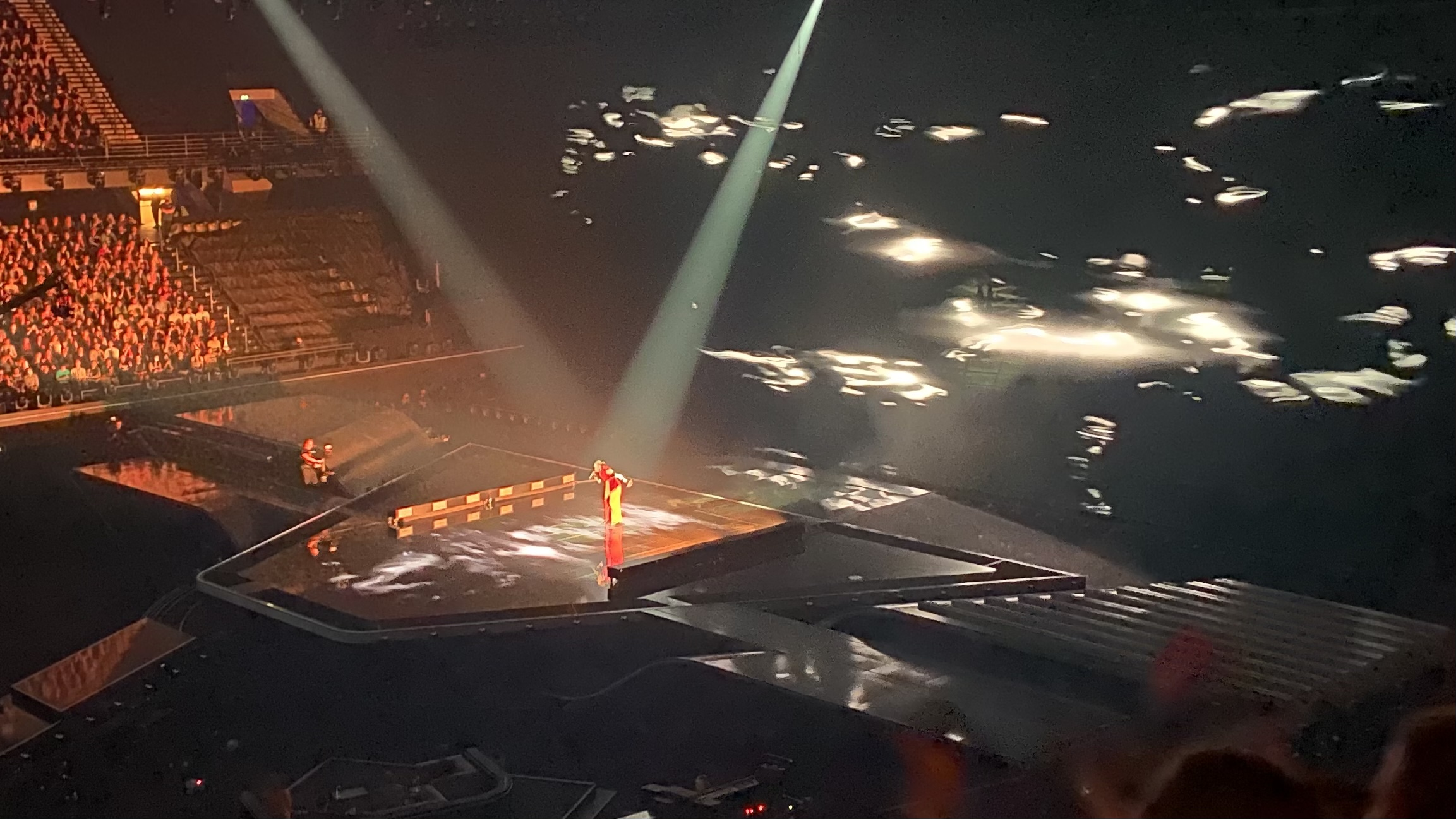
Tusse in Rotterdam (2021)

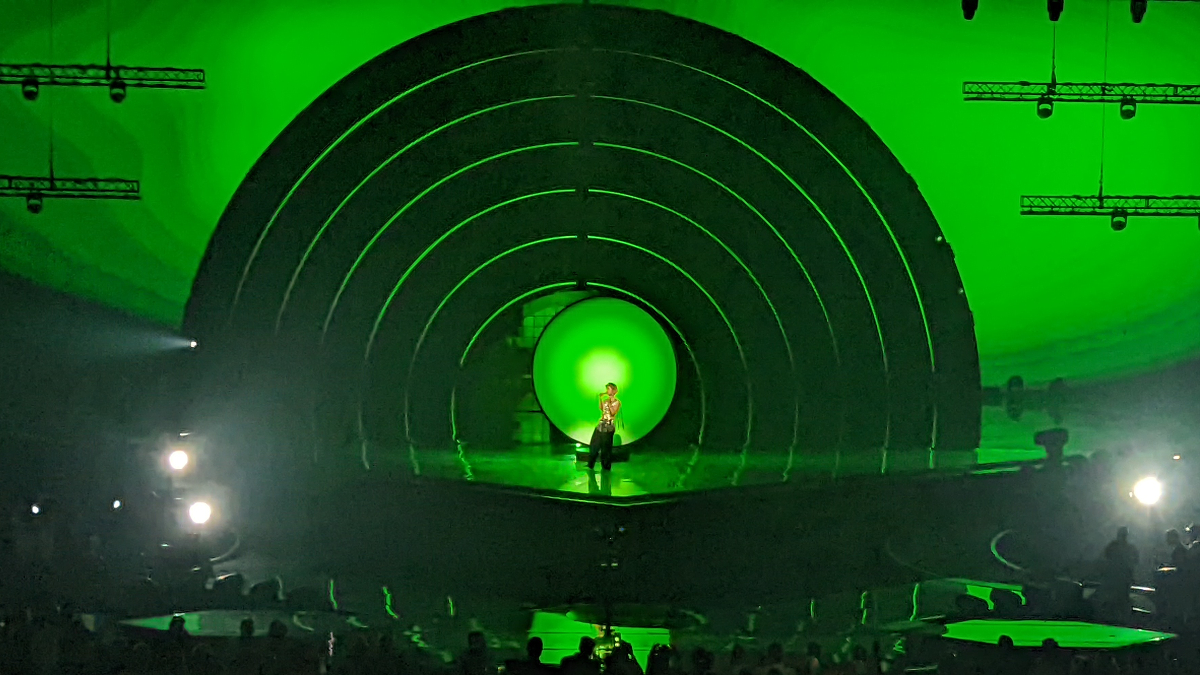
Cornelia Jakobs in Turin (2022)

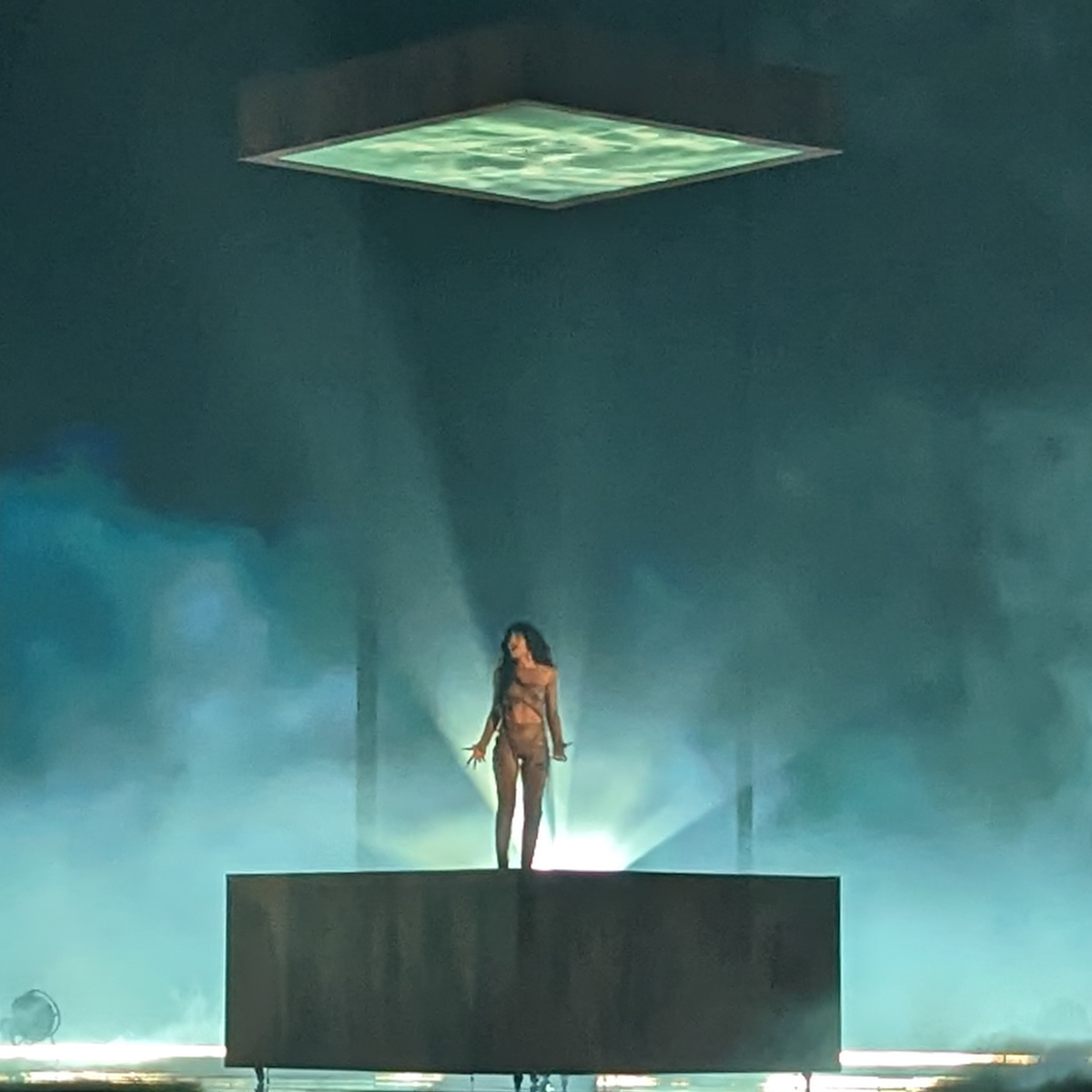
Loreen in Liverpool (2023)

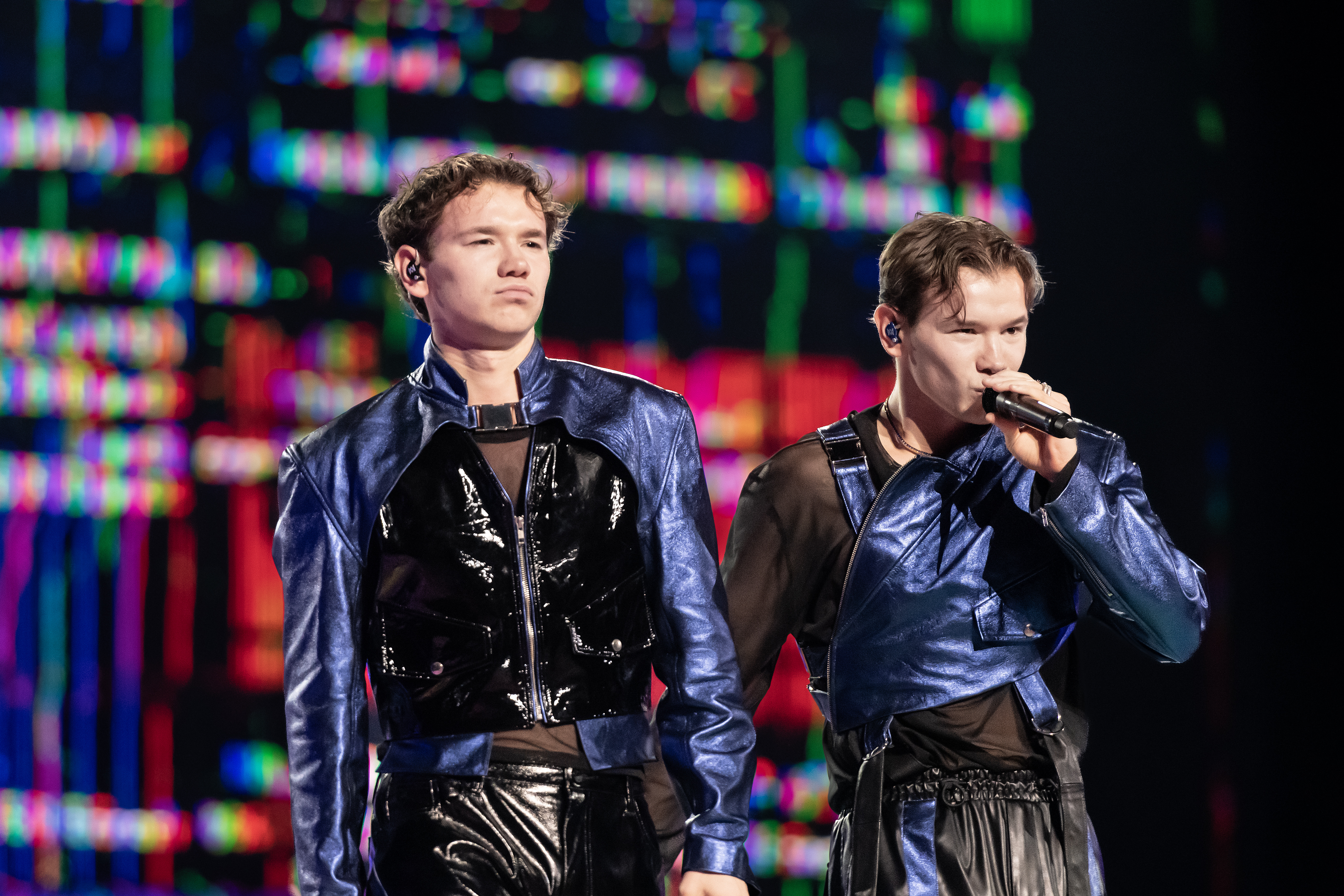
Marcus & Martinus in Malmö (2024)

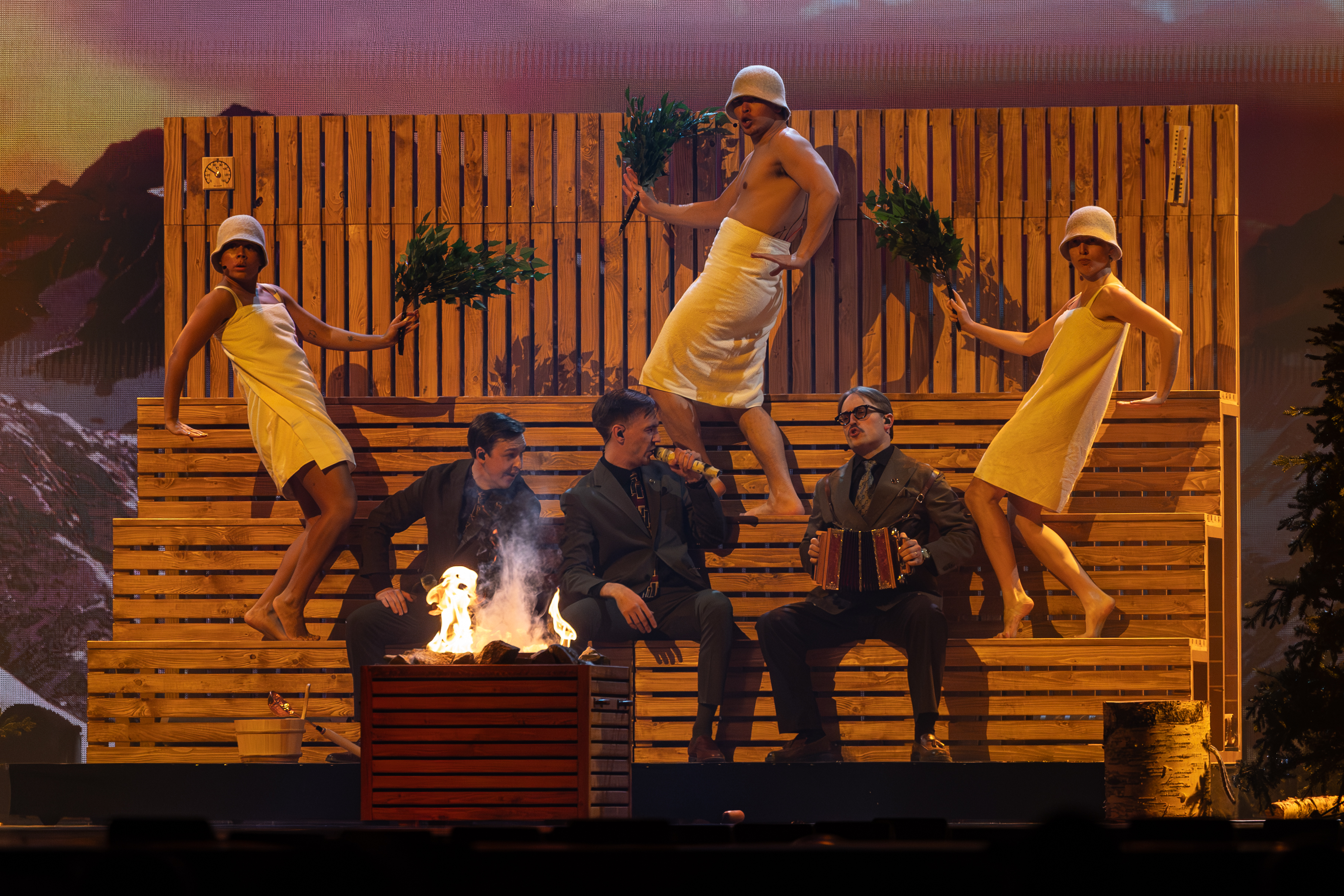
KAJ in Basel (2025)

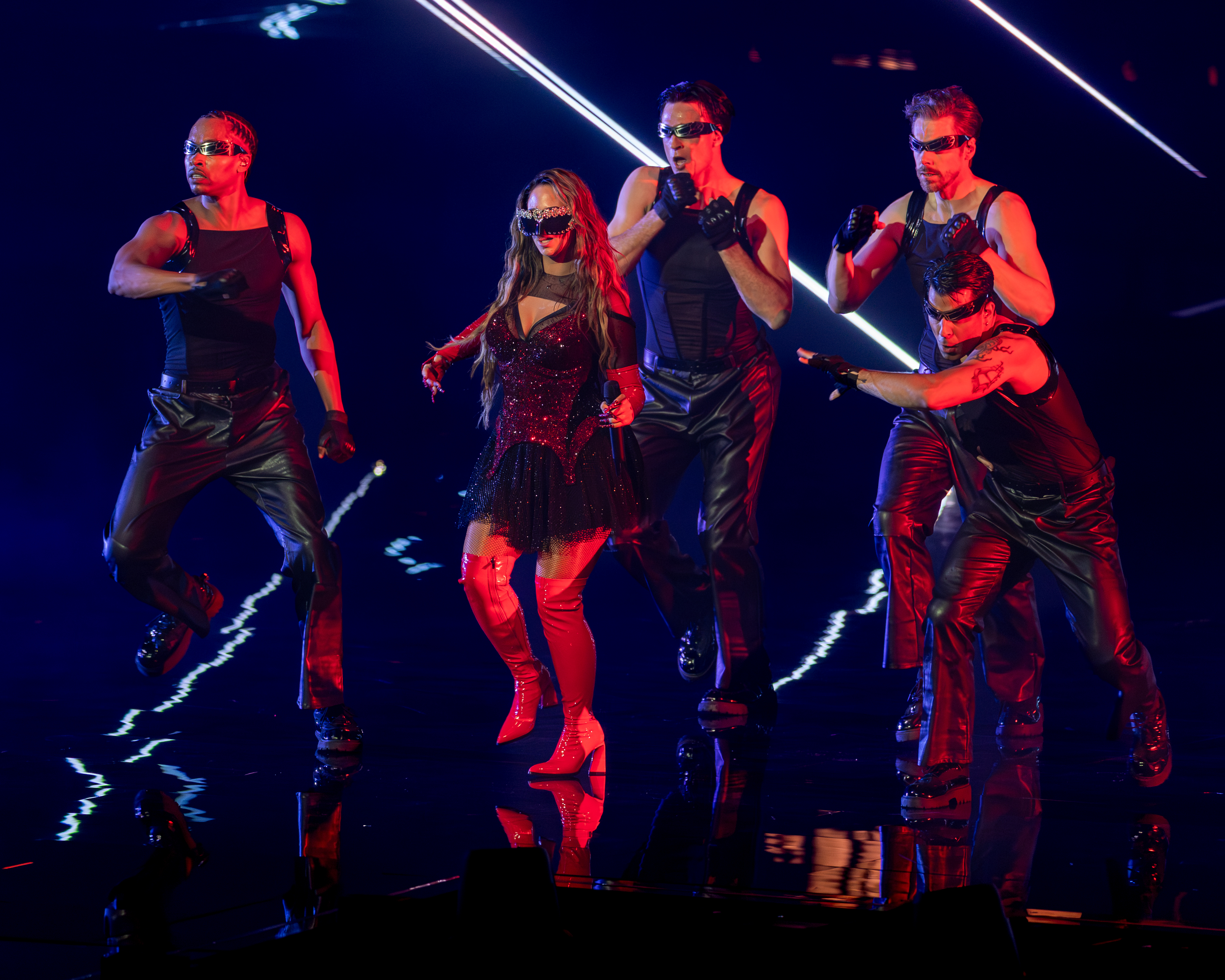
Felicia in Vienna (2026)

== See also ==
- Melodifestivalen
- Sweden in the Junior Eurovision Song Contest – Junior version of the Eurovision Song Contest.
