= John Chrispinsson =

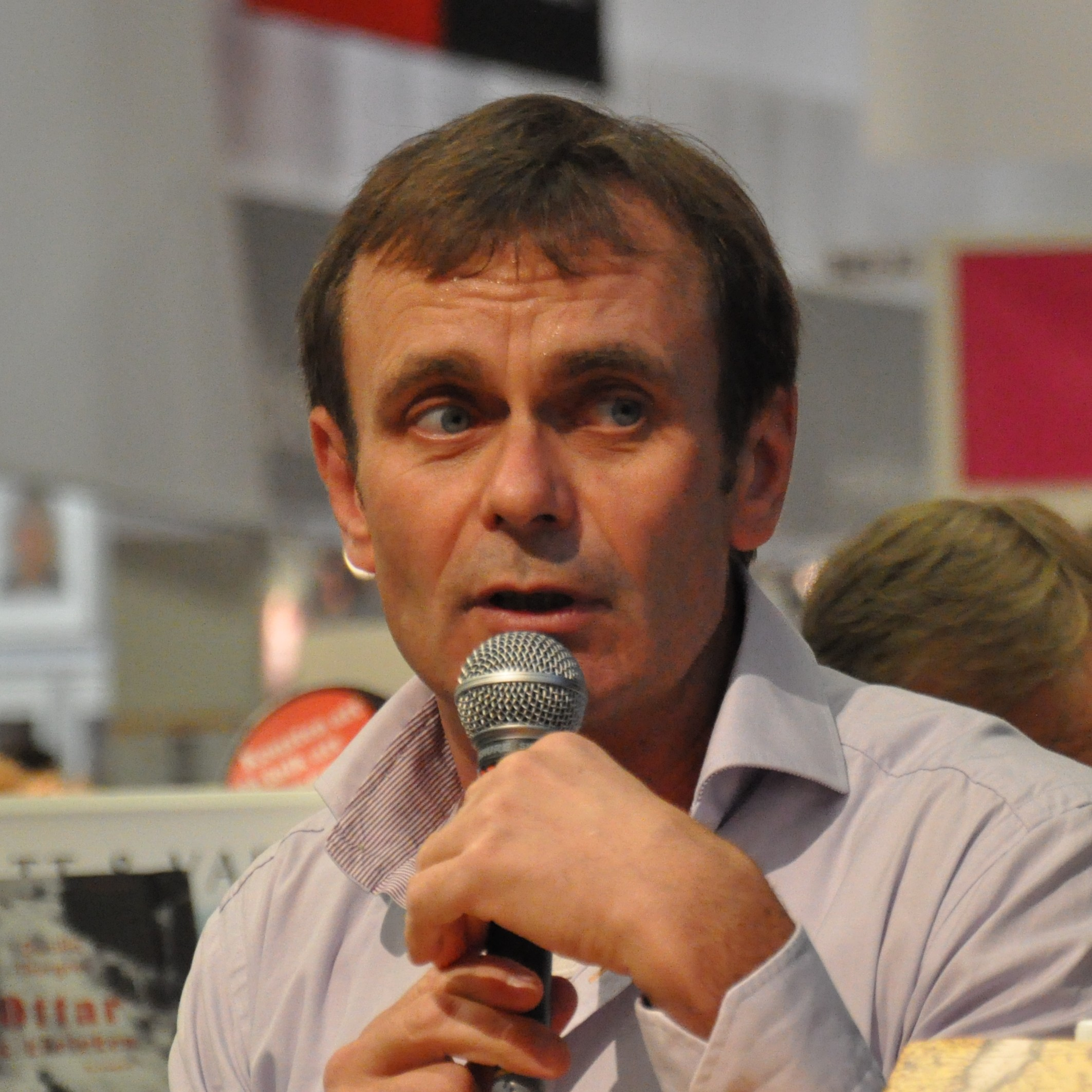
- Chrispinsson in 2011
- Born: John Knut Chrispinsson; 13 December 1956
- Died: 3 April 2017 (aged 60)
- Occupation(s): Television presenter, journalist

John Knut Chrispinsson (13 December 1956 – 3 April 2017) was a Swedish journalist, author and television presenter. He worked mostly in TV and radio with news programmes and historical programmes. Chrispinsson also wrote several books on Swedish history.

== Biography ==
Chrispinsson was born in Enskede parish, Stockholm. He started to work as a journalist for Strengnäs Tidning, Expressen and Sveriges Radio. In 1988, he started to work for SVT, and presented programmes including Svepet; Gomorron Sverige; the Wedding of Prince Carl Philip and Sofia Hellqvist; Melodifestivalen 1989 with Yvonne Ryding; Röda rummet and Bokbussen. He co-hosted eight live broadcasts from the Nobel Prize festivities in Stockholm between 2001 and 2011.

In 1990, he started working for Sveriges Radio P1 where he presented Förmiddag i P1 and Direkt. He then spent most of the 1990s, presenting the news show Kanalen. He also was producer of the radio show Historiska klubben.

Outside the TV house, he often worked as a debate leader at conferences and hearings on politics, economics, science and community planning.

Chrispinsson collapsed suddenly from a heart attack outside a gym and died on 3 April 2017. Previously, he had suffered from borrelia.

== Bibliography ==
- Sekelskiften: en krönika om sex, makt och pengar. Stockholm: Norstedt. 1999. ISBN 91-1-300541-3
- Stockholmsutställningar. Stockholms historia. Stockholm: Historiska Media. 2007. ISBN 978-91-85377-08-4
- G. A. Reuterholm: den gråtande diktatorn. Stockholm: Prisma. 2008. ISBN 978-91-518-5115-0
- Den glömda historien: om svenska öden och äventyr i öster under tusen år. Stockholm: Norstedt. 2011. ISBN 978-91-1-302524-7
