= Karin Falck =

Swedish television director, hostess and producer

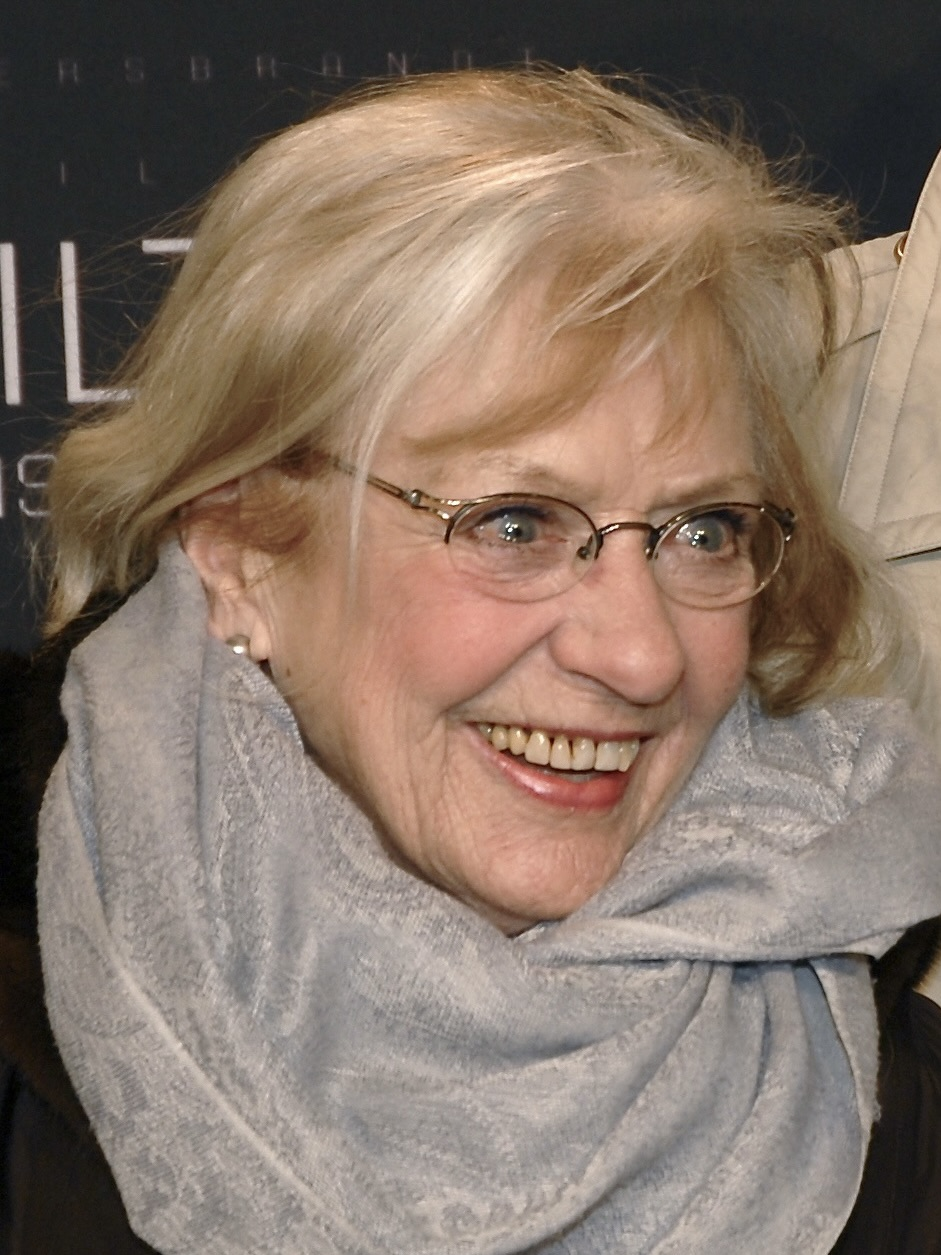
- Falck at a gala premiere in Stockholm, 2012
- Born: Anna Karin Margareta Edström; 6 February 1932 (age 94); Säffle, Sweden
- Other names: Karin Sohlman; Karin Sohlman-Falck
- Occupations: Television presenter; television producer; television director
- Spouses: Ragnar Sohlman (m. 1953; div. 1960) Åke Falck (m. 1960; died 1974)
- Partner: Hans Dahlberg (since 1980; died 2019)
- Children: 3, including Rolf

Anna Karin Margareta Falck (née Edström; born 6 February 1932) is a Swedish television director, hostess and producer.

== Career ==
Falck was born in Säffle, Värmland County and lived her first six years of life in Karlstad. She moved with her mother and younger brother to Stockholm when she was 6 years old since her father died. In her youth, she dreamed of playing ice hockey.

When Falck started on TV, she had studied theater history and English at Stockholm University, where she wrote an essay on children's theater. She then became an assistant to Elsa Olenius who started Barnteatern (now Vår Teater).

Falck began her TV career in 1954 as a scriptwriter in Alf Sjöberg's TV set of Hamlet. Curiosity about the television medium made her apply for Radiotjänst's first producer course in 1955. The supervisors came from the BBC in London. Other female TV pioneers on the course were Ingrid Samuelsson, Marianne Anderberg, Lena Fürst and Barbro Svinhufvud.

Falck's work spans a large part of the history of Swedish television. She was employed at SVT, then known as Sveriges Radio, already in 1956 and has produced and directed many entertainment programs over the years, as well as light drama, theatre and cabaret shows. In 1975, she hosted the Eurovision Song Contest in Stockholm. In 2007, she received the Lifetime Achievement Award at the annual Kristallen, the Swedish television awards. In 2020, she was made a member of the Melodifestivalen Hall of Fame.

== See also ==
- List of Eurovision Song Contest presenters
- List of Melodifestivalen presenters

Preceded by (United Kingdom) Katie Boyle	Eurovision Song Contest presenter 1975	Succeeded by (Netherlands) Corry Brokken
