= Melodifestivalen 2027 =

Swedish music competition

Dates and venues
- Heat 1: 6 February 2027; Löfbergs Arena, Karlstad
- Heat 2: 13 February 2027; Scandinavium, Gothenburg
- Heat 3: 20 February 2027; Malmö Arena, Malmö
- Heat 4: 27 February 2027; Halmstad Arena, Halmstad
- Heat 5: 6 March 2027; Himmelstalundshallen, Norrköping
- Final: 13 March 2027; Strawberry Arena, Stockholm

Organisation
- Host broadcaster: Sveriges Television (SVT)
- Presenters: Björn Kjellman; Oscar Zia

Vote
- Voting system: Heats: 100% public vote Final: 50% public vote, 50% jury vote

Melodifestivalen 2027 is set to be the 67th edition of the Swedish music competition Melodifestivalen, organised by Sveriges Television (SVT) and will take place during a six-week period between 6 February and 13 March 2027, hosted by Björn Kjellman and Oscar Zia. The winner of the competition will go on to represent Sweden in the Eurovision Song Contest 2027.

== Format ==
Melodifestivalen 2027 will consist of six weekly shows held in six Swedish cities (Karlstad, Gothenburg, Malmö, Halmstad, Norrköping and Stockholm).

Competition schedule
Show	Date	City	Venue
Heat 1	6 February 2027	Karlstad	Löfbergs Arena
Heat 2	13 February 2027	Gothenburg	Scandinavium
Heat 3	20 February 2027	Malmö	Malmö Arena
Heat 4	27 February 2027	Halmstad	Halmstad Arena
Heat 5	6 March 2027	Norrköping	Himmelstalundshallen
Final	13 March 2027	Stockholm	Strawberry Arena

For the 2027 contest, performers are required to be at least 17 years old in the year they competed in the event, and for the first time since 2001, the Second Chance (Andra chansen) round will not be held.

=== Presenters ===
On 28 August 2026, SVT announced Oscar Zia – who had previously taken on the role in 2021 and 2022 – and Björn Kjellman as the main hosts of the 2027 edition.

== Competing entries ==
A public submission window was open between 21 August and 11 September 2026 to select the 30 competing entries. Upon closing the submission period, SVT announced that 4,077 applications had been received.
