= Fredrik Belfrage =

Swedish TV and radio presenter and sports reporter

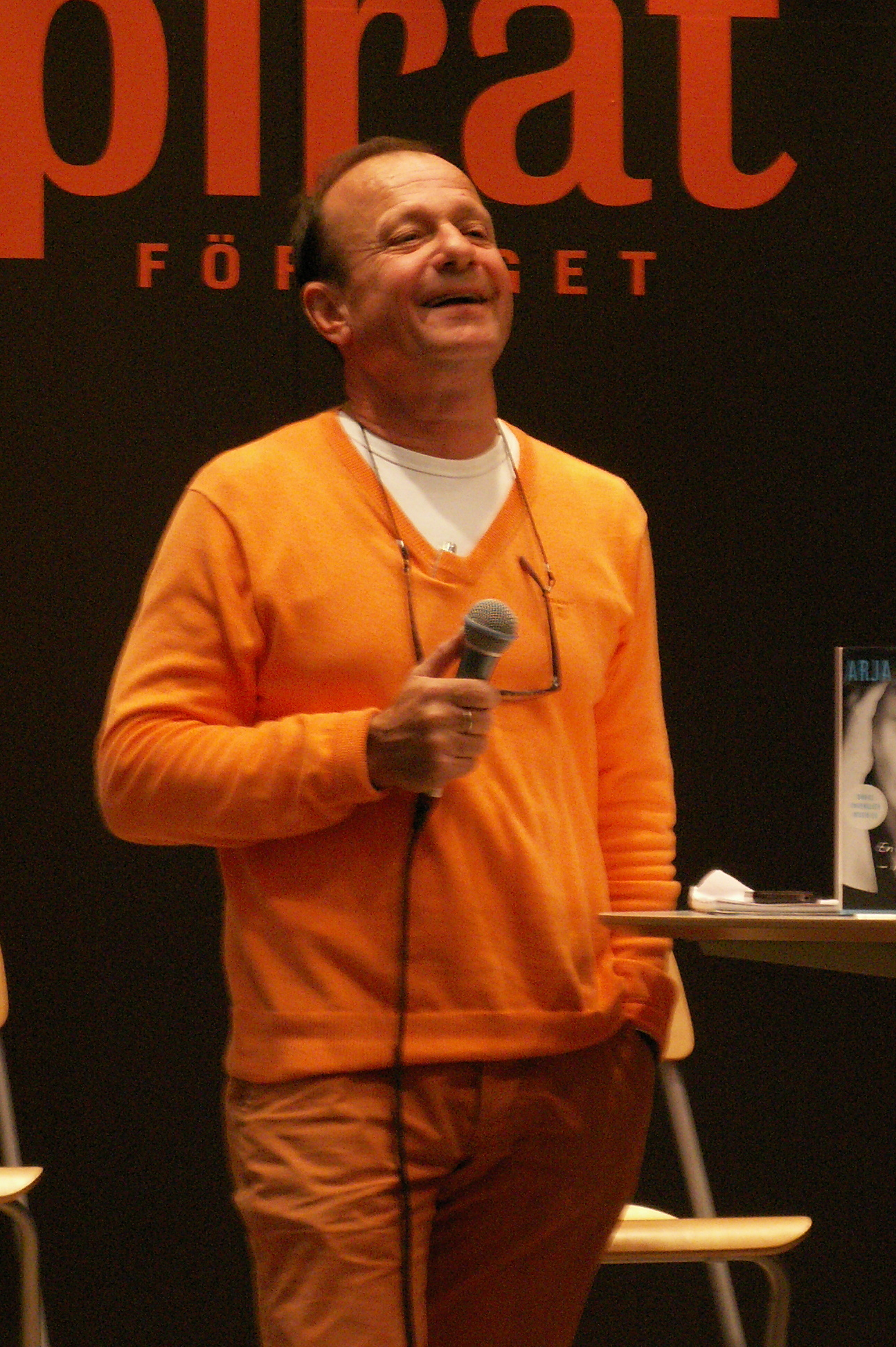
Belfrage in 2011

Fredrik Belfrage (born Knut Fredrik Åkesson Belfrage; 29 July 1949, in Växjö) is a Swedish TV and radio presenter and sports reporter. He is the son of the dentist Åke Belfrage (1915–1985) and Vera Maria, born Vange (1914–1984). He is descended from a noble family of Scottish origin, and wears a tie in his clan tartan.

Belfrage has presented numerous series such as the well-known Melodifestivalen (heats for the Eurovision Song Contest), Gomorron Sverige, Bell & Bom, Prat i Kvadrat, Tipsextra, Lilla Sportspegeln and Vinna eller försvinna. He was initially involved in the 2009–10 revival of Här är ditt liv, the Swedish programme based on This Is Your Life, but left after a dispute with Sveriges Television.
