= Ulf Elfving =

Swedish journalist and broadcaster

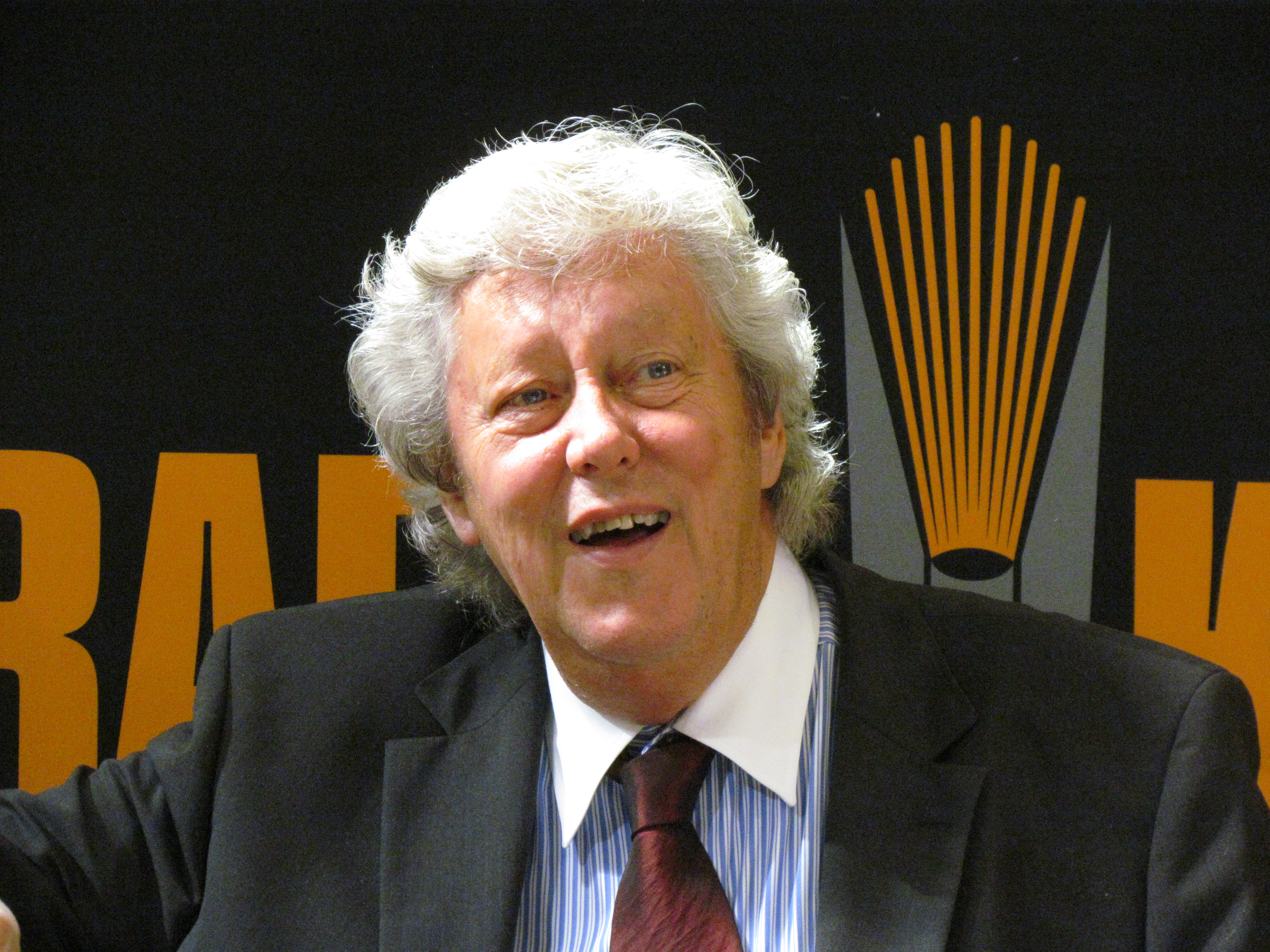
Ulf Elfving in 2011

Ulf Elfving (born 27 November 1942 in Stockholm) is a Swedish journalist and broadcaster.

Elfving started his career in the 1960s. He was programme manager of the Swedish charts between 1966 and 1973 and Record Mirror in the 1970s. He hosted the Melodifestivalen in 1977, 1978 and 1979 and provided the Swedish commentary for the Eurovision Song Contest on eight occasions between 1977 until 1983 and again in 1986.

Until the late 1990s Elfving was a radio show host on Sveriges Radio P4.

He was awarded the Swedish Grand Journalism Prize in 1989, and the Swedish Radio Academy (Radioakademin) Grand Prize in 2002.
