= Sven Lindahl =

Swedish journalist and musician (1937–2025)

- Born: 25 June 1937
- Died: 2 July 2025 (aged 88)

Sven Gustaf Lindahl (25 June 1937 – 2 July 2025) was a Swedish journalist, songwriter and radio and television presenter.

As a teenager, he played in a boogie-woogie band. After leaving school, he worked briefly as a welding apprentice in Luton and later studied at an iron foundry in Chesterfield but eventually came to study journalism at Poppius Journalistskola before he started working at the local newspaper Västerort.

Lindahl presented the radio show Svensktoppen for Sveriges Radio. Lindahl hosted Melodifestivalen, twice in 1963 and 1966. In addition, Lindahl commented for Sweden at the 1964 and the 1966 Eurovision Song Contest. From 1969, Lindahl was a member of SKAP (Swedish composers of popular music).

On 2 July 2025, Lindahl died at the age of 88.
