= Sweden in the Eurovision Song Contest 2012 =

- Eurovision Song Contest 2012
- Participating broadcaster: Sveriges Television (SVT)
- Country: Sweden
- Selection process: Melodifestivalen 2012
- Selection date: 10 March 2012

Competing entry
- Song: "Euphoria"
- Artist: Loreen
- Songwriters: Thomas G:son; Peter Boström

Placement
- Semi-final result: Qualified (1st, 181 points)
- Final result: 1st, 372 points

Participation chronology

Sweden was represented at the Eurovision Song Contest 2012 with the song "Euphoria", written by Thomas G:son and Peter Boström, and performed by Loreen. The Swedish participating broadcaster, Sveriges Television (SVT), organised the national final Melodifestivalen 2012 in order to select its entry for the contest. After a six-week-long competition consisting of four heats, a Second Chance round and a final, "Euphoria" performed by Loreen emerged as the winner after achieving the highest score following the combination of votes from eleven international jury groups and a public vote.

Sweden was drawn to compete in the second semi-final of the Eurovision Song Contest which took place on 24 May 2012. Performing during the show in position 11, "Euphoria" was announced among the top 10 entries of the second semi-final and therefore qualified to compete in the final on 26 May. It was later revealed that Sweden placed first out of the 18 participating countries in the semi-final with 181 points. In the final, Sweden performed in position 17 and placed first out of the 26 participating countries, winning the contest with 372 points. This was Sweden's fifth win in the Eurovision Song Contest, having previously won in 1974, 1984, 1991, and 1999.

== Background ==
Prior to the 2012 contest, Sveriges Radio (SR) until 1979, and Sveriges Television (SVT) since 1980, had participated in the Eurovision Song Contest representing Sweden fifty-one times since SR's first entry in 1958. They had won the contest on four occasions: in 1974 with the song "Waterloo" performed by ABBA, in 1984 with the song "Diggi-Loo Diggi-Ley" performed by Herreys, in 1991 with the song "Fångad av en stormvind" performed by Carola, and in 1999 with the song "Take Me to Your Heaven" performed by Charlotte Nilsson. Following the introduction of semi-finals for the 2004 contest, Swedish entries, to this point, have featured in every final except for 2010 when it failed to qualify. In 2011, "Popular" performed by Eric Saade placed third.

As part of its duties as participating broadcaster, SVT organises the selection of its entry in the Eurovision Song Contest and broadcasts the event in the country. Since 1959, SR first and SVT later have organised the annual competition Melodifestivalen in order to select their entries for the contest.

== Before Eurovision ==
=== Melodifestivalen 2012 ===
Melodifestivalen 2012 was the Swedish music competition organised by SVT to select its entry for the Eurovision Song Contest 2012. 32 songs competed in a six-week-long process which consisted of four heats on 4, 11, 18 and 25 February 2012, a second chance round on 3 March 2012, and a final on 10 March 2012. The six shows were hosted by Sarah Dawn Finer, Gina Dirawi, and Helena Bergström. Eight songs competed in each heat—the top two qualified directly to the final, while the third and fourth placed songs qualified to the second chance round. The bottom four songs in each heat were eliminated from the competition. An additional two songs qualified to the final from the second chance round. The results in the heats and second chance round were determined exclusively by public televoting, while the overall winner of the competition was selected in the final through the combination of a public vote and the votes from eleven international jury groups. Among the competing artists were former Eurovision Song Contest contestants Lotta Engberg (participating as a duet with Christer Sjögren) who represented Sweden in 1987, Charlotte Perrelli who represented Sweden in 1999 (which she won) and 2008, Afro-Dite who represented Sweden in 2002, and Andreas Lundstedt who represented Switzerland in 2006. Molly Sandén represented Sweden in Junior Eurovision 2006.

==== Heats and Second Chance round ====
- The first heat took place on 4 February 2012 at the Vida Arena in Växjö. "Euphoria" performed by Loreen and "Mystery" performed by Dead by April qualified directly to the final, while "Sean den förste Banan" performed by Sean Banan and "Jag reser mig igen" performed by Thorsten Flinck and Revolutionsorkestern qualified to the Second Chance round. "På väg" performed by Abalone Dots, "I Want to Be Chris Isaak (This Is Just the Beginning)" performed by The Moniker, "The Boy Can Dance" performed by Afro-dite, and "Salt and Pepper" performed by Marie Serneholt were eliminated.
- The second heat took place on 11 February 2012 at the Scandinavium in Gothenburg. "Shout It Out" performed by David Lindgren and "Soldiers" performed by Ulrik Munther qualified directly to the final, while "Baby Doll" performed by Top Cats and "Stormande hav" performed by Timoteij qualified to the Second Chance round. "I din himmel" performed by Sonja Aldén, "Aldrig aldrig" performed by Andreas Lundstedt, "Det går för långsamt" performed by Mimi Oh, and "Ge aldrig upp" performed by Thomas Di Leva were eliminated.
- The third heat took place on 18 February 2012 at the Tegera Arena in Leksand. "Why Am I Crying" performed by Molly Sandén and "Mirakel" performed by Björn Ranelid feat. Sara Li qualified directly to the final, while "Youngblood" performed by Youngblood and "Lovelight" performed by Andreas Johnson qualified to the Second Chance round. "I mina drömmar" performed by Maria BenHajji, "Förlåt mig" performed by Mattias Andréasson, "Just a Little Bit" performed by Love Generation and "Sanningen" performed by Carolina Wallin Pérez were eliminated.
- The fourth heat took place on 25 February 2012 at the Malmö Arena in Malmö. "Amazing" performed by Danny Saucedo and "Why Start a Fire" performed by Lisa Miskovsky qualified directly to the final, while "Land of Broken Dreams" performed by Dynazty and "Don't Let Me Down" performed by Lotta Engberg and Christer Sjögren qualified to the Second Chance round. "The Girl" performed by Charlotte Perrelli, "Allting blir bra igen" performed by OPA!, "Goosebumps" performed by Hanna Lindblad, and "Kyss mig" performed by Axel Algmark were eliminated.
- The Second Chance round (Andra chansen) took place on 3 March 2012 at the Rosvalla Nyköping Eventcenter in Nyköping. "Baby Doll" performed by Top Cats and "Jag reser mig igen" performed by Thorsten Flinck and Revolutionsorkestern qualified to the final.

==== Final ====
The final was held on 10 March 2012 at the Globe Arena in Stockholm. Ten songs competed—two qualifiers from each of the four preceding heats and two qualifiers from the Second Chance round. The combination of points from a viewer vote and eleven international jury groups determined the winner. The viewers and the juries each had a total of 473 points to award. The nations that comprised the international jury were Belgium, Bosnia and Herzegovina, Cyprus, Estonia, France, Germany, Ireland, Malta, Norway, Ukraine and the United Kingdom. "Euphoria" performed by Loreen was selected as the winner with 268 points.

R/O	Artist	Song	Juries	Televote	Total	Place
1	David Lindgren	"Shout It Out"	65	23	88	4
2	Thorsten Flinck and Revolutionsorkestern	"Jag reser mig igen"	3	40	43	8
3	Dead by April	"Mystery"	25	27	52	7
4	Lisa Miskovsky	"Why Start a Fire"	21	18	39	9
5	Top Cats	"Baby Doll"	35	33	68	6
6	Loreen	"Euphoria"	114	154	268	1
7	Ulrik Munther	"Soldiers"	62	26	88	3
8	Björn Ranelid feat. Sara Li	"Mirakel"	1	24	25	10
9	Molly Sandén	"Why Am I Crying"	55	22	77	5
10	Danny Saucedo	"Amazing"	92	106	198	2

== At Eurovision ==
Sweden competed in the second half of the second semi-final in Baku on 24 May 2012, following Croatia and preceding Georgia. Loreen received 181 points and placed 1st, thus qualifying for the final on 26 May. The public awarded Sweden 1st place with 180 points and the jury awarded 1st place with 148 points.

In the final, Sweden was drawn to have performed 17th, after Greece and preceding Turkey. The Swedish entry received votes from 40 countries and won the contest, with only Italy failing to award them any points. Loreen scored a total of 372 points, the second-highest winning score in the contest's history after Norway's 387 point win in 2009. Sweden received a record set of 12 points from 18 countries. The public awarded Sweden 1st place with 343 points and the jury awarded 1st place with 296 points. This was the fifth win for Sweden at the Contest.

The Swedish entry was awarded two of the three Marcel Bezençon Awards, which honour the best of the competing entries for the 2012 contest in different areas of achievement. The Artistic Award was presented to the best artist as voted by the commentators and the Composer Award was the best and most original composition as voted on by the participating composers. Loreen's performance in the contest was directed by Swedish choreographer Ambra Succi.

=== Voting ===
==== Points awarded to Sweden ====
Points awarded to Sweden (Semi-final 2)
Score	Country
12 points	Estonia; Georgia; Germany; Netherlands; Norway; Slovakia
10 points	Bulgaria; Lithuania; Portugal; Slovenia
8 points	Macedonia; Malta; United Kingdom
7 points	Belarus; Bosnia and Herzegovina; Serbia; Ukraine
6 points	Croatia; France
5 points	Turkey
4 points	
3 points	
2 points	
1 point	

Points awarded to Sweden (Final)
Score	Country
12 points	Austria; Belgium; Denmark; Estonia; Finland; France; Germany; Hungary; Iceland; Ireland; Israel; Latvia; Netherlands; Norway; Russia; Slovakia; Spain; United Kingdom
10 points	Cyprus; Lithuania; Romania; Serbia; Slovenia
8 points	Bosnia and Herzegovina; Bulgaria; Georgia
7 points	Azerbaijan; Croatia; Moldova; Montenegro; Switzerland
6 points	Belarus; Greece; Malta; Macedonia; Turkey; Ukraine
5 points	Albania
4 points	
3 points	Portugal; San Marino
2 points	
1 point	

==== Points awarded by Sweden ====
Points awarded by Sweden (Semi-final 2)
Score	Country
12 points	Estonia
10 points	Norway
8 points	Serbia
7 points	Turkey
6 points	Ukraine
5 points	Bosnia and Herzegovina
4 points	Malta
3 points	Slovakia
2 points	Lithuania
1 point	Netherlands

Points awarded by Sweden (Final)
Score	Country
12 points	Cyprus
10 points	Serbia
8 points	Estonia
7 points	Russia
6 points	Turkey
5 points	Ireland
4 points	Spain
3 points	Norway
2 points	France
1 point	Albania
