= Third Chance (Melodifestivalen) =

Third Chance is a web-contest organized by Sveriges Television. Thirty-two unsuccessful Melodifestivalen entries in the past ten years will have a third opportunity for a spot in the grand final. The third chance procedure is similar to the actual one, there will be four rounds of third chances (four semi-finals), a last chance (second-chance) and the final. There will be ten participants in the grand final. The winner will be decided by internet viewers and an expert jury while the qualifiers from the semi-finals will be decided by the internet viewers only.

== First edition (2012) ==
The first edition of Third Chance took place in January 2012, when Melodifestivalen 2012 began. Every week fans from Sweden, Europe and the rest of the world could vote their favourite song with 2 winners from each round (total 8 songs) to the finals and 8 songs for a last chance with available 2 spots left for the final.

=== Semi-final 1 ===
#	Artist	Song	Year	Voting		Place	Result
#	Artist	Song	Year	Votes	Percent.	Place	Result
1	The Attic feat. Therese	"The Arrival"	2007	1,001	6.88%	7	Out
2	Patrik Isaksson	"Faller du så faller jag"	2006	1,463	10.06%	5	Out
3	Poets	"What Difference Does It Make"	2002	2,087	14.35%	3	Last Chance
4	PayTV	"Trendy Discoteque"	2004	1,247	8.57%	6	Out
5	Pain of Salvation	"Road Salt"	2010	3,492	24.00%	1	Final
6	Dilba	"Try Again"	2011	1,904	13.09%	4	Last Chance
7	Eskobar	"Hallellujah New World"	2008	398	2.74%	8	Out
8	Velvet	"The Queen"	2009	2,965	20.38%	2	Final

=== Semi-final 2 ===
#	Artist	Song	Year	Voting		Place	Result
#	Artist	Song	Year	Votes	Percent.	Place	Result
1	Verona	"La Musica"	2007	1,336	7.71%	6	Out
2	Uno & Irma	"God Morgon"	2007	994	5.74%	8	Out
3	Anniela	"Elektrisk"	2011	1,672	9.65%	4	Last Chance
4	Magnus Carlsson	"Live Forever"	2007	4,030	23.26%	1	Final
5	BWO	"Gone"	2005	1,162	6.71%	7	Out
6	Andrés Esteche	"Just Like A Boomerang"	2003	1,395	8.05%	5	Out
7	Pauline	"Sucker For Love"	2010	3,355	19.36%	3	Last Chance
8	Ola	"Love in Stereo"	2008	3,385	19.53%	2	Final

=== Semi-final 3 ===
#	Artist	Song	Year	Voting		Place	Result
#	Artist	Song	Year	Votes	Percent.	Place	Result
1	Bosson	"Efharisto"	2004	3,681	18.88%	2	Final
2	Anna Sahlene & Maria Haukaas Storeng	“Killing Me Tenderly”	2009	914	4.69%	6	Out
3	Roger Pontare	"Silverland"	2006	1,888	9.68%	5	Out
4	Lasse Lindh	“Du behöver aldrig mer vara rädd”	2008	776	3.93%	7	Out
5	Christian Walz	"Like Suicide"	2011	2,219	11.38%	4	Last Chance
6	Kalle Moraeus & Orsa Spelmän	"Underbart"	2010	2,511	12.88%	3	Last Chance
7	Maarja-Liis Ilus	"He Is Always On My Mind"	2003	235	1.21%	8	Out
8	Loreen	"My Heart is Refusing Me"	2011	7,281	37.35%	1	Final

=== Semi-final 4 ===
#	Artist	Song	Year	Voting		Place	Result
#	Artist	Song	Year	Votes	Percent.	Place	Result
1	Love Generation	"Dance Alone"	2011	4 239	31.03%	1	Final
2	Lili & Susie	“Show Me Heaven”	2009	2 447	17.91%	2	Final
3	Melody Club	"The Hunter"	2011	2 019	14.78%	3	Last Chance
4	Johnson & Häggkvist	“One Love”	2008	1 975	14.46%	4	Last Chance
5	Magnus Uggla	"För kung och fosterland"	2007	1 805	13.21%	5	Out
6	Autolove	"Bulletproof Heart"	2004	487	3.57%	6	Out
7	Josefine Nilsson	"Med hjärtats egna ord"	2005	360	2.64%	7	Out
8	Anna Maria Espinosa	Innan alla ljusen brunnit ut	2010	328	2.40%	8	Out

=== Last Chance (Sista chansen) ===
#	Artist	Song	Year	Voting		Place	Result
#	Artist	Song	Year	Votes	Percent.	Place	Result
1	Dilba	"Try Again"	2011	834	9.77%	6	Out
2	Poets	“What Difference Does It Make”	2002	496	5.81%	8	Out
3	Anniela	"Elektrisk"	2011	725	8.49%	7	Out
4	Pauline	“Sucker For Love”	2010	1 530	17.92%	2	Final
5	Christian Walz	"Like Suicide"	2011	1 205	14.11%	4	Out
6	Kalle Moraeus & Orsa Spelmän	"Underbart"	2010	1 335	15.64%	3	Out
7	Johnson & Häggkvist	"One Love"	2008	868	10.17%	5	Out
8	Melody Club	"The Hunter"	2011	1 545	18.1%	1	Final

=== Final ===
#	Artist	Song	Year	Voting		Place	Result
#	Artist	Song	Year	Votes	Percent.	Place	Result
1	Pain of Salvation	"Road Salt"	2010	7 959	29.22%	2	Out
2	Velvet	"The Queen"	2009	985	3.62%	8	Out
3	Magnus Carlsson	"Live Forever"	2007	2 121	7.79%	3	Out
4	Ola	"Love in Stereo"	2008	773	2.84%	10	Out
5	Loreen	"My Heart is Refusing Me"	2011	9 416	34.57%	1	WINNER
6	Bosson	"Efharisto"	2004	1 730	6.35%	4	Out
7	Love Generation	"Dance Alone"	2011	1 278	4.69%	5	Out
8	Lili & Susie	"Show Me Heaven"	2009	778	2.86%	9	Out
9	Pauline	"Sucker for Love"	2010	1 109	4.07%	6	Out
10	Melody Club	"The Hunter"	2011	1092	4.01%	7	Out
