= Blame It on You (disambiguation) =

Blame It on You is a 2019 song by American country music singer Jason Aldean from his album 9.

Blame It on You may also refer to:

- "Blame It on You", 2017 song by Charli XCX from her mixtape Number 1 Angel
- "Blame It on You", 1986 song by Poison from their album Look What the Cat Dragged In
- "Blame It on You", 2011 song by Swedish boy band Youngblood from their album Running Home to You

== See also ==
- "Blame It on Yourself", song by American band Ivy from Long Distance
