= Cornelia Jakobs =

Swedish singer (born 1992)

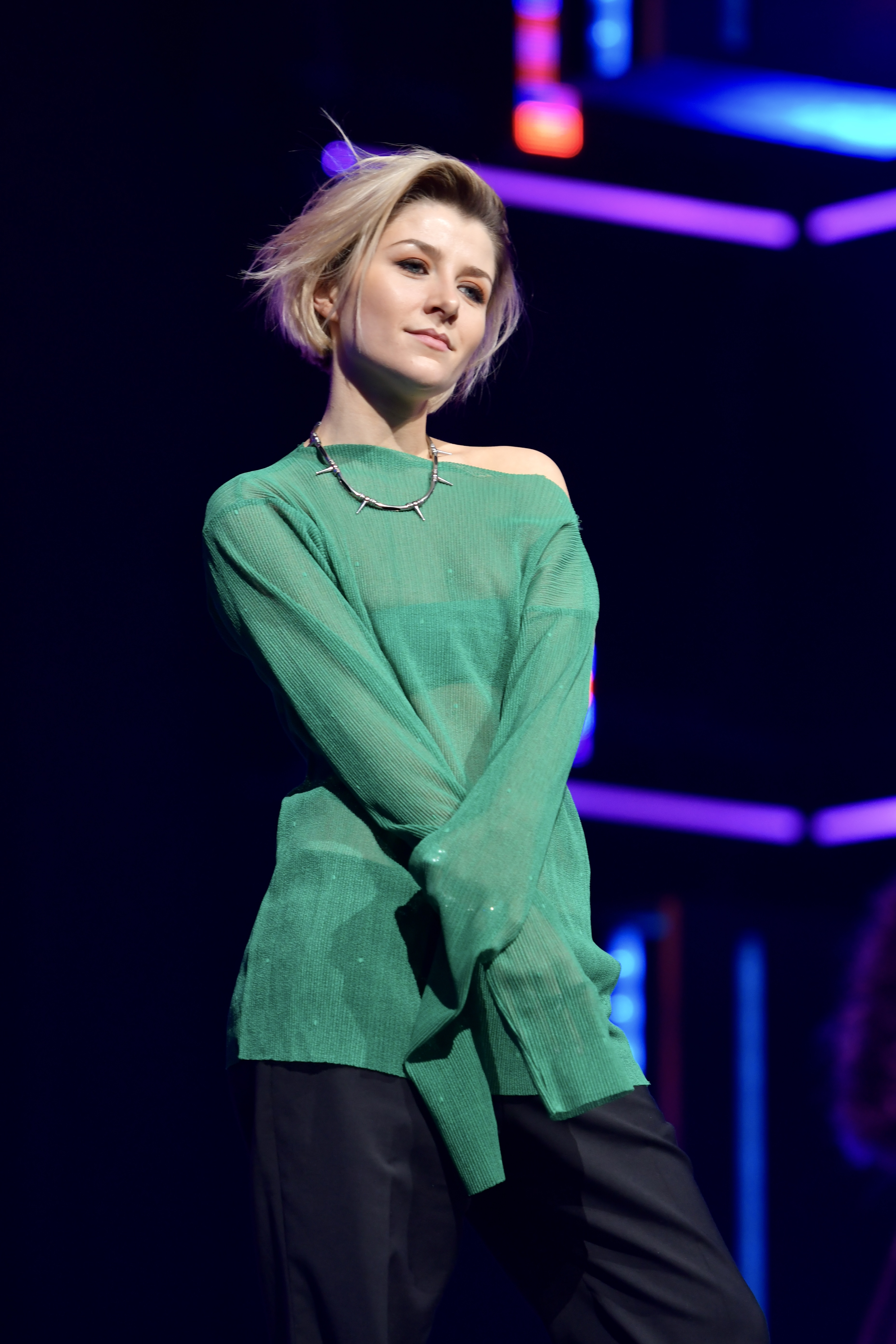
- Jakobs in 2022

Background information
- Born: Anna Cornelia Jakobsdotter Samuelsson; 9 March 1992 (age 34); Nacka Municipality, Sweden
- Genre: Pop
- Occupations: Singer; songwriter
- Years active: 2010–present
- Formerly of: Love Generation

Anna Cornelia Jakobsdotter Samuelsson (born 9 March 1992), known professionally as Cornelia Jakobs, is a Swedish singer and songwriter. She represented Sweden in the Eurovision Song Contest 2022 with the song "Hold Me Closer", placing fourth.

== Biography ==
=== Early life ===
Cornelia Jakobsdotter was born in Nacka Municipality, Stockholm County, and grew up in Stockholm. The daughter of the Poodles' singer Jakob Samuel and Fia Lönnborn, she first entered music by auditioning for Idol 2008; she received some media attention after being mocked by the judges. 14 years later jury member Anders Bagge and Jakobs both participated and were favorites in Melodifestivalen 2022 and he then apologized, saying "Shit, how wrong you can be, how talented you are".

=== 2011–2021: Love Generation and songwriting ===
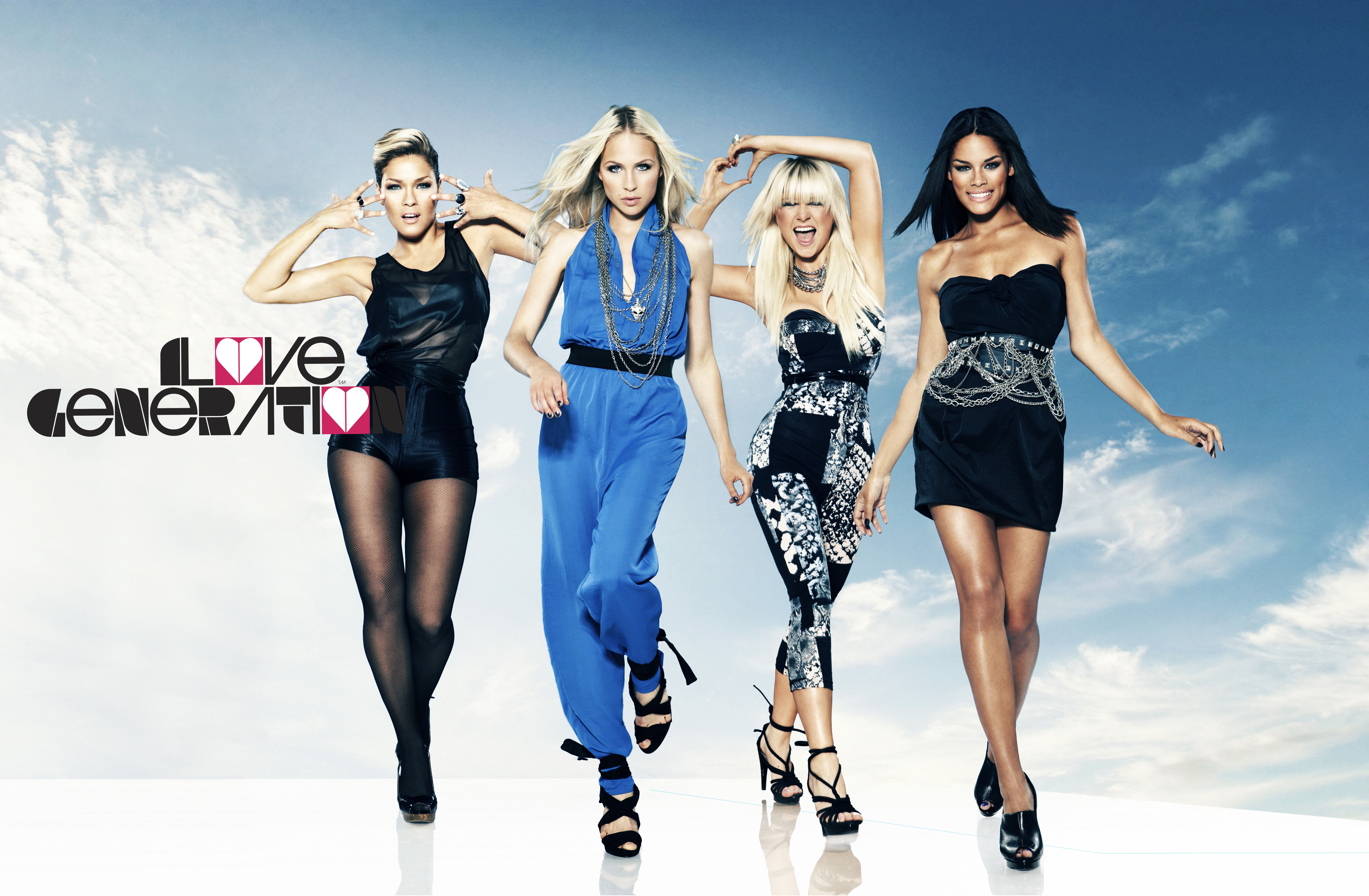
Love Generation in 2010, from left to right: Charly Q, Mikaela, Cornelia and Melanie

She started her music career as a member of the girl group Love Generation, who participated in Melodifestivalen 2011 and 2012. Love Generation's 2011 entry "Dance Alone" peaked at number 26 on the Sverigetopplistan.

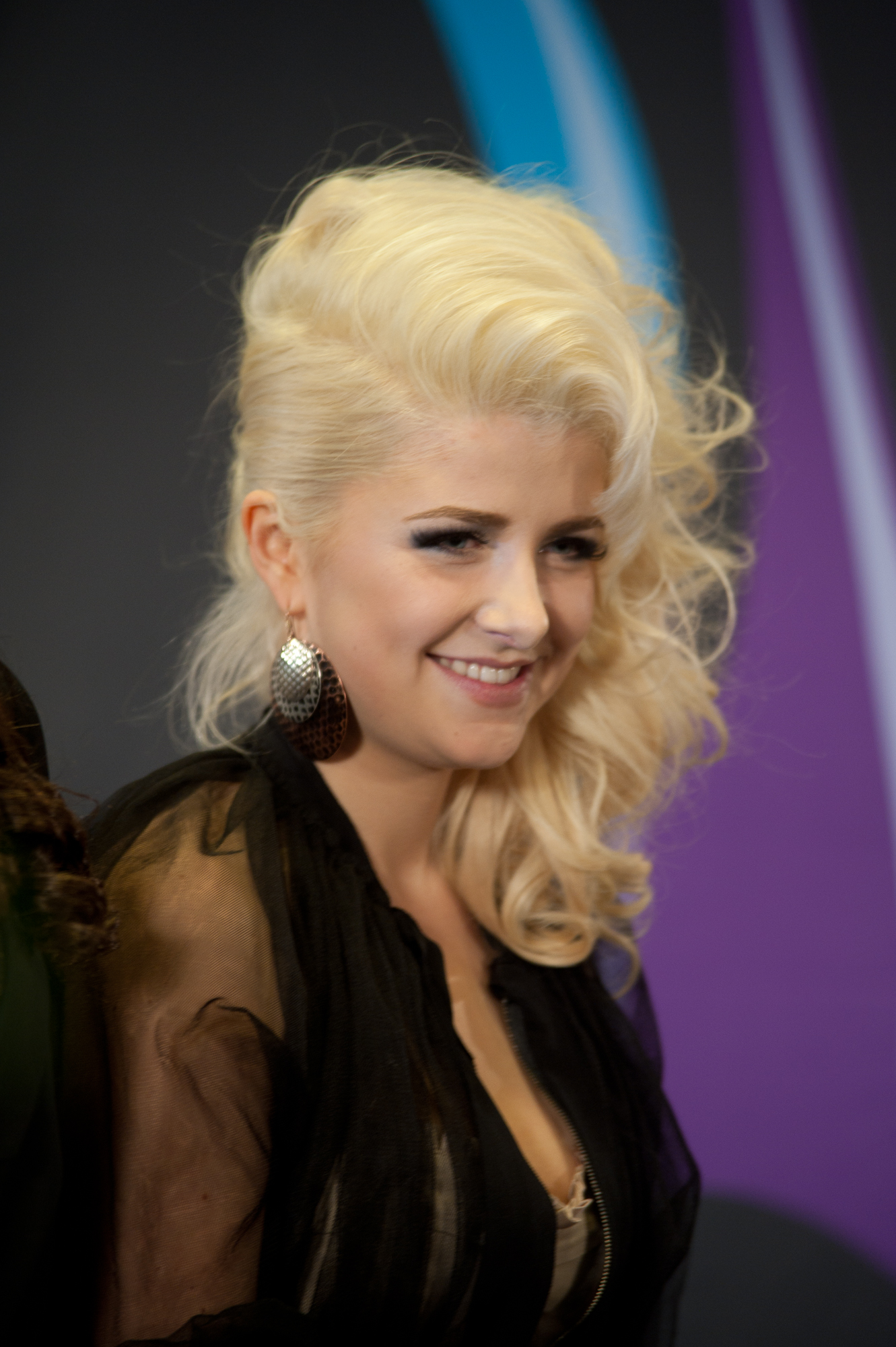
Jakobs in 2010

In 2020, Jakobs composed and performed the song "Weight of the World" which became the soundtrack for the HBO Nordic series Beartown (Swedish: Björnstad). She participated in Melodifestivalen 2021 as a songwriter for the song "Best of Me" performed by Efraim Leo.

=== 2022–present: Melodifestivalen and Eurovision ===
In 2022, Jakobs went solo as a singer and participated in Melodifestivalen 2022 with the song "Hold Me Closer", which qualified for the final and later won with 146 points, thus earning her the right to represent Sweden in the Eurovision Song Contest 2022 in Turin. In the final she finished in fourth place overall, with 438 points. Jakobs was one of the performers during the interval at the final of the Eurovision Song Contest 2023, where she performed "I Turn to You" by Melanie C in a segment which celebrated host city Liverpool's contribution to pop music. Jakobs released "Need You Now" in July 2023, in which she revealed that she has ADHD.

== Discography ==
=== Singles ===
List of singles, with selected chart positions
Title	Year	Peak chart positions						
Title	Year	SWE	FIN	IRE	LTU	NLD	NOR	UK
"Late Night Stories"	2018	—	—	—	—	—	—	—
"All the Gold"	2018	— (Note: "All the Gold" did not enter the Swedish Singellista Chart, but peaked at number 10 on the Swedish Heatseeker Chart.)	—	—	—	—	—	—
"You Love Me"	2018	—	—	—	—	—	—	—
"Animal Island"	2018	—	—	—	—	—	—	—
"Shy Love"	2018	—	—	—	—	—	—	—
"Locked Into You"	2018	—	—	—	—	—	—	—
"Hanging On"	2019	—	—	—	—	—	—	—
"Dream Away"	2020	—	—	—	—	—	—	—
"Weight of the World"	2020	—	—	—	—	—	—	—
"Hold Me Closer"	2022	1	9	38	5	76	15	59
"Fine"	2022	— (Note: "Fine" did not enter the Swedish Singellista Chart, but peaked at number 15 on the Swedish Heatseeker Chart.)	—	—	—	—	—	—
"Rise"	2022	— (Note: "Rise" did not enter the Swedish Singellista Chart, but peaked at number one on the Swedish Heatseeker Chart.)	—	—	—	—	—	—
"It Takes a Fool to Remain Sane"	2023	83	—	—	—	—	—	—
"I Turn to You"	2023	—	—	—	—	—	—	—
"Need You Now"	2023	—	—	—	—	—	—	—
"—" denotes a recording that did not chart or was not released in that territory.

== Awards ==
Year	Award ceremony	Category	Nominee(s)/work(s)	Result	Ref.
2022	Marcel Bezençon Awards	Composer Award	"Hold Me Closer"	Won	
2022	Rockbjörnen	Swedish Song of the Year	"Hold Me Closer"	Won	
2022	Rockbjörnen	Breakthrough of the Year	Herself	Won	
2022	Musikplats Stockholm	Song of the Year	"Hold Me Closer"	Won	
2022	Musikförläggarnas Pris	Song of the Year	"Hold Me Closer"	Won	
2023	Grammis	Song of the Year	"Hold Me Closer"	Nominated	
2023	Grammis	Newcomer of the Year	Herself	Won	

== Notes ==
Preceded by Tusse with "Voices"	Sweden in the Eurovision Song Contest; 2022	Succeeded by Loreen with "Tattoo"
