= Synden =

Book by Björn Ranelid

- First edition cover
- Author: Björn Ranelid
- Language: Swedish
- Published: 1994
- Publisher: Albert Bonniers Förlag
- Publication place: Sweden
- Awards: August Prize of 1994

Synden (The Sin) is a 1994 novel by Swedish author Björn Ranelid. It won the August Prize in 1994.
