= 2012 in Swedish music =

The following is a list of notable events and releases of the year 2012 in Swedish music.

== Events ==
=== May ===
- 6 – Swedish singer Loreen won the 57th annual Eurovision Song Contest in Baku, Azerbaijan.

=== June ===
- 6 – The 20th Sweden Rock Festival started in Norje (June 6 – 9).

== Album and singles releases ==
=== April ===
- 23 – Sibelius: Symphonies Nos. 5 & 7; Karelia Suite by Gothenburg Symphony Orchestra

=== September ===
- 7 – Atlantis by Elephant9, with Reine Fiske (Rune Grammofon).

=== Unknown date ===
#

G –

== See also ==
- Sweden in the Eurovision Song Contest 2012
- List of number-one singles and albums in Sweden (see 2012 section on page)
