= Running Home to You =

Studio album by Youngblood
- Released: March 7, 2012
- Recorded: 2011–2012
- Genre: Pop
- Label: EMI Sweden

Singles from Running Home to You
- 1. "Blame It On You"; 2. "Youngblood"

Running Home to You is the debut studio album by Swedish boyband Youngblood released through EMI Sweden. Two singles were released from the album prior, "Blame It On You" and their Melodifestivalen 2012 entry "Youngblood."

== Track list ==
1. "Youngblood" (3:04)
2. "American Girlfriend" (3:09)
3. "Tenderly" (4:09)
4. "Play My Song" (3:39)
5. "Blame It On You" (3:11)
6. "Running Home to You" (4:00)
7. "Sleep On It" (4:03)
8. "Outside Boy" (3:54)
9. "Youngblood" (Instrumental) (3:07)

== Charts ==
=== Weekly charts ===
Chart (2012)	Peak position
Swedish Albums (Sverigetopplistan)	7

=== Year-end charts ===
Chart (2012)	Position
Swedish Albums (Sverigetopplistan)	68
