= Don't Let Me Down (Lotta Engberg and Christer Sjögren song) =

Single by Lotta Engberg & Christer Sjögren

from the album Lotta & Christer
- Released: 2012
- Genre: Pop, schlager
- Songwriter(s): Lars Diedricson, Lasse Holm

"Don't Let Me Down" is a song written by Lars Diedricson and Lasse Holm, and performed by Lotta Engberg and Christer Sjögren at Melodifestivalen 2012, where it was performed during the 4th semifinal in Malmö. Reaching Andra chansen, it was knocked out by Thorsten Flinck's Jag reser mig igen.

On 18 March 2012 the song was tested for Svensktoppen. entering the chart the upcoming week.

The song charted at Svensktoppen for three weeks. before being knocked out.

The song lyrics is based on media gossip about a relationship between the performers in an early 1990s dansband Sweden.
