= PEAB Arena =

Indoor arena in Nyköping, Sweden

Coordinates: 58°44.7′N 17°2.5′E

PEAB Arena is an indoor arena in Nyköping, Sweden. Its current capacity is 5,500 and it was built in 2003. It was the home arena of the Nyköpings Hockey ice hockey team. It has been named after the construction company PEAB.

== See also ==
- Rosvalla Nyköping Eventcenter
