= Unchained (Molly Sandén album) =

Studio album by Molly Sandén
- Released: 23 May 2012
- Recorded: 2012
- Genre: Dance-pop; R&B
- Length: c. 40 minutes
- Label: EMI Music Sweden

Molly Sandén chronology
Samma himmel (2009)	Unchained (2012)

Unchained is the second studio album by Swedish pop singer Molly Sandén, released on 23 May 2012 by EMI.

== Track listing ==
No.	Title	Writer(s)	Length
1.	"Rollercoaster"	Molly Sandén, Aleena Gibson, Elias Kapari	3:38
2.	"Kill This Love"	Molly Sandén, Aleena Gibson, Moh Denebi	3:56
3.	"Mirage"	Peter Ries, Niklas Petterson, Lutz Weidendörfer, Jessy Philipp	3:49
4.	"This Party"	Molly Sandén, Moh Denebi, Aleena Gibson, Nick Jarl	3:08
5.	"A Little Forgiveness" (featuring Christopher)	Molly Sandén, Aleena Gibson, Robin Fredriksson, Mattias Larsson	3:48
6.	"Unchained"	Molly Sandén, Aleena Gibson, Anton Hård af Segerstad	3:38
7.	"Why Am I Crying"	Molly Sandén, Windy Wagner, Aleena Gibson	3:02
8.	"Green Light"	Molly Sandén, Johan Ramström, Patrik Magnusson	3:37
9.	"My Hands Around My Heart"	Molly Sandén, Moh Denebi, Aleena Gibson, Jasmine Anderson	4:16
10.	"Spread a Little Light"	Molly Sandén, Fredrik Thomander, Aleena Gibson	3:06
11.	"Why Am I Crying" (acoustic version)	Molly Sanden, Windy Wagner, Aleena Gibson	4:13

== Charts ==
Chart (2012)	Peak position
Swedish Albums (Sverigetopplistan)	1
