= Krigaren =

2001 novel by Björn Ranelid

- First edition
- Author: Björn Ranelid
- Language: Swedish
- Set in: Sweden
- Published: 2001
- Publisher: Albert Bonniers Förlag
- Publication place: Sweden

Krigaren (lit. The Warrior) is a 2001 novel by Swedish writer Björn Ranelid.

== Plot ==
David Saxon is an American who after fighting in Vietnam deserts and finds a haven in Sweden. Saxon's younger brother was killed in the war and is mourned as a hero, whilst himself was disowned by his family - parents, wife and children. Being young, he decides to start a new life in the capital of Sweden, Stockholm. He learns Swedish, makes friends, and finds a job as a janitor in a school. Through his work he gets acquainted with many of the children and young adolescents, some of which come from Stockholm's more troubled suburbs. Among them are Selma and Joppe, sister and brother. Later, after Saxon's retirement, Selma runs away from home and asks the former janitor for help and shelter. Her brother, who since he left school has been searching his fortune in the criminal world of the capital, has been found murdered. Selma's determination to find the murderer is as strong as Saxon's will to get to know young Selma under her tough surface.

== Comments ==
Ranelid tells his stories in a non-linear fashion, and the narrator travels in time as the plot goes on. From Birmingham, Alabama, to the jungle in Vietnam to the isles of Stockholm, the story tells more of the human nature than of the murder, and spans over almost the entire adult life of Saxon. The novel covers both an ant's view of political history since the sixties and a deeply philosophical introspective of what values really matter in life. Ranelid paints a portrait of a man who has both inflicted and suffered loss and who with time surmounts his griefs with the help of love and care.
