= Opa (Swedish band) =

OPA!
- Origin: Malmö, Sweden
- Genres: Pop, folk, ethnic music, fusion
- Years active: 2012-present
- Labels: Roasting House
- Members: Michael Sideridis; Thor Ahlgren; Martin Eriksson; Johan Ohlsson; Andreas Rudenå; Emil Sjunnesson
- Website: opaband.com

OPA! is a Malmö-based Swedish 6-member musical band with Swedish and folk / pop / ethnic influences featuring Greek-Swedish singer Michael Sideridis (lead vocals). Other members are Thor Ahlgren, Martin Eriksson, Johan Ohlsson, Andreas Rudenå and Emil Sjunnesson.

The band took part in Sweden's Melodifestivalen 2012 in day 4 of semi-finals held at Malmö Arena on 25 February 2012 with the song "Allting blir bra igen" (meaning Everything will be fine again) with music and lyrics by Michael Sideridis. They are signed with Roasting House label and distribution by Universal Music.

Following Melodifestivalen, the band released their debut album Tills du kan sjunga med that entered the Swedish Albums Chart at #26 in May 2012.

== Members ==
- Michael Sideridis - lead vocals
- Thor Ahlgren - bouzouki
- Martin Eriksson - double bass
- Johan Ohlsson - accordion
- Andreas Rudenå - guitar
- Emil Sjunnesson - percussions

== Discography ==
=== Albums ===
Year	Album	Peak position SWE
2012	Tills du kan sjunga med	26

=== Singles ===
- 2012: "Allting blir bra igen" (in Melodifestivalen 2012)
- 2012: "Himmelskt"
