= Thomas Di Leva =

Swedish singer-songwriter

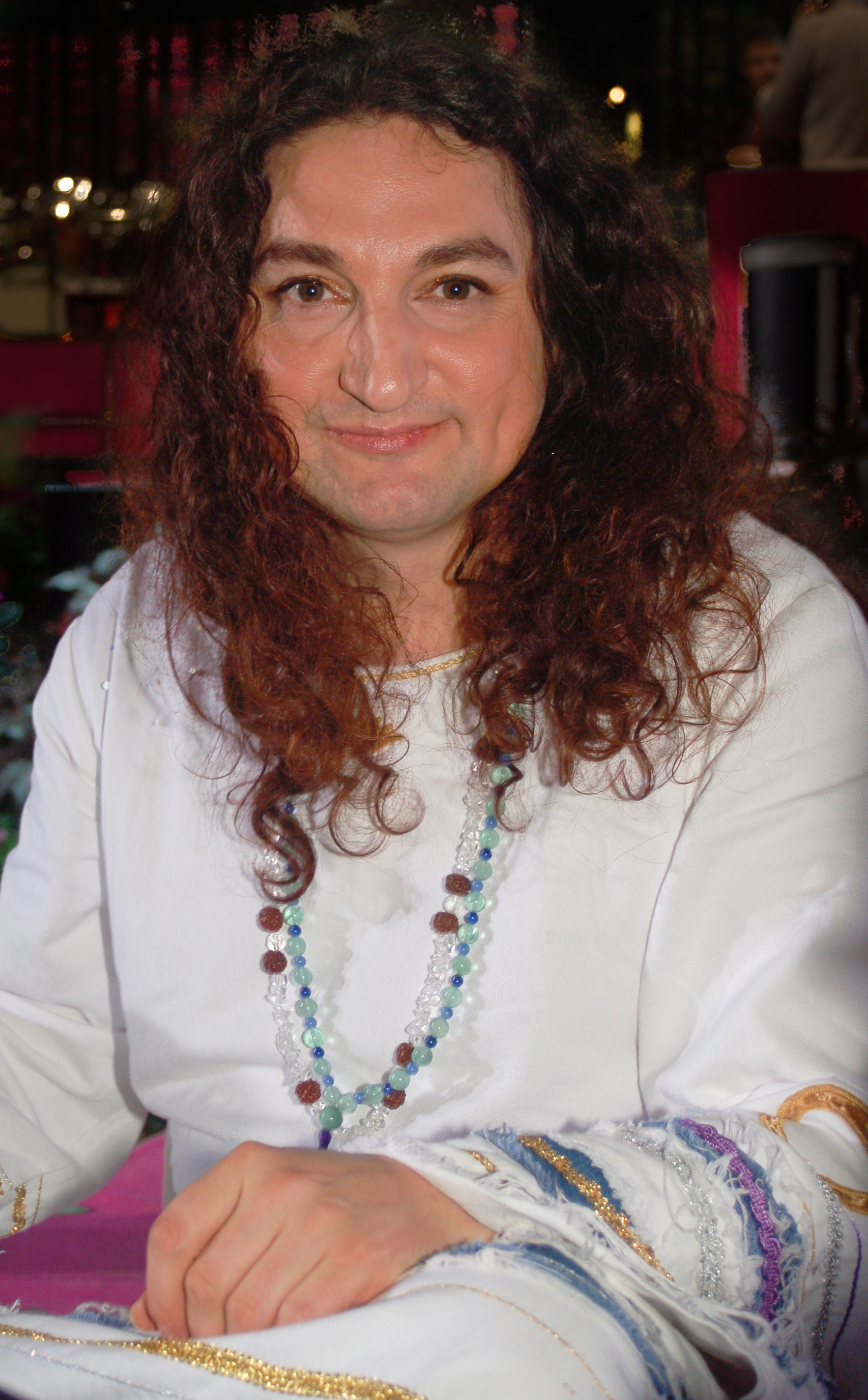
- Magnusson in 2008

Background information
- Born: Sven Thomas Magnusson; 23 October 1963 (age 62); Gävle, Sweden
- Occupations: Singer; songwriter
- Years active: 1980–present
- Website: dileva.se
- Musical career
- Instrument: Vocals

Sven Thomas Magnusson (born 23 October 1963), known by his stage names Thomas Di Leva or simply Di Leva, is a Swedish singer and songwriter.

== Biography ==
Sven Thomas Magnusson was born 1963 in Gävle, Gävleborg County, Gästrikland, Sweden. At 14 years of age, he changed his name from Magnusson to Di Leva, inspired both by his mother's Italian maiden name and idols like Leonardo da Vinci and Charlie Chaplin. He started his career with the band The Pillisnorks, debuting with the EP 4 Visitors on 1 January 1980. Later, Di Leva formed the band Modern Art, which subsequently became Modærn Art. In autumn 1981, Di Leva signed a record contract as a solo artist with the recently formed record label Adventure. The following year, Di Leva released his debut album, Marginal Cirkus. After a short time at the Stranded label, Billy Bolero took Di Leva to the newly-established Papa Records. The album På ett fat was released, and Di Leva became known throughout the country. Di Leva said "I want to create great art in the form of simple music for the large audience." With the song "Kom till mig", recorded with strings from Fläskkvartetten and the Raj Montana Band, Di Leva reached the Trackslistan in 1985 for the first time and had his first hit. The following year he released his third album, Pussel.

Vem ska jag tro på was released in autumn 1987 and became Di Leva's breakthrough album. The album was produced in the cellar of Mistlur Records in Roslags Street with co-producer Kaj Erixon. On the album's first track, "I morgon", a new tone atmosphere and new sound effects can be heard, with Johan Vävare performing using oscillator and keyboard sounds. The album was nominated by Slitz as best album of the year and placed second in the Aftonbladet re-vote of the yearly Rockbjörnen award in the category Best Swedish Album. Di Leva took part in Melodifestivalen 2012 with the song "Ge aldrig upp" (Never Give Up) but failed to qualify in the finals.

== Discography ==
=== Albums ===
(Credited as Di Leva, except where indicated)

Year	Album	SWE Peak	Notes
1982	Marginal Cirkus	–	Re-released in 2001
1985	På ett fat	–	Re-released in 1989
1986	Pussel	41	
1987	Vem ska jag tro på?	17	
1989	Rymdblomma	7	
1991	Noll	6	
1993	Naked Number One	6	Re-released in 1995
1993	Love Is The Heart	22	
1997	Jag är du	13	
1997	I Am You	13	English version of album Jag är du
2000	Älska	5	
2004	Tiden Faller	2	
2004	Free Life	–	
2006	Hoppets Röst	8	
2006	Mantra Miracles	–	
2010	Lovestar	10	
2011	Hjärtat Vinner Alltid	10	
2013	Innan solen går upp	58	
2025	När Änglar Dör		

==== Compilation albums ====
Year	Album	SWE Peak	Notes
1995	Flashback #02	–	
1999	För Sverige i rymden – Di Levas bästa	1	
2005	Själens krigare: Samlade Sånger 1980–2005	8	
2012	Vi har bara varandra – Di Levas klassiker	20	

=== Singles ===
(Vinyl 1980–1991/1993) (CD 1988/1990–2004)

==== Charting singles ====
Year	Single	SWE Peak	Album
1993	"Naked Number One"	34	Naked Number One
1994	"Everyone Is Jesus"	11	
1996	"Den glada stjärnan"	43	
2004	"Vad är frihet?"	29	

==== Other singles ====
- 1980 – The Pillisnorks: 4 Visitors
- 1981 – Modaern Art: Circle in different shapes
- 1981 – Modaern Art: Envy/Magic Place
- 1982 – Johan Vävares Tango: (Nu tändas åter ljusen) I min lilla stad
- 1982 – Single man / Appear of need
- 1983 – Om jag vill
- 1984 – Bring me a magician / The dirty clown
- 1985 – Två på skilda håll / Rätt & fel
- 1985 – Kom till mig / Vem älskar du?
- 1986 – Snurra bakåt ! / Himlen (Heaven)
- 1986 – Glad att du ännu har tårar / Fördämningen
- 1987 – Vem ska jag tro på / Tycker om
- 1988 – Du är precis / Söta lilla blomma
- 1988 – Dansa din djävul / Snart bländar solstrålar
- 1989 – Vi har bara varandra / Du ger/du gör
- 1989 – Om du vore här nu / Om du längtar
- 1990 – Själens krigare / Struntar i dig
- 1991 – Dansa naken med mig / Själens krigare (solid bass mix) / Själens krigare (Extended 12" mix)
- 1993 – Naked number one (French clubmix) / Naked number one (Original version) / Naked number one (French submix) / Polish meditation (Feel it loud)
- 1993 – Naked number one / Naked number one (Eternal heart mix) / Naked number one (The gathering) / It is accomplished
- 1993 – Adam & Eve (Sunflash remix) / Adam & Eve (Giant orange) / Adam & Eve (Original version) / Drive me wild
- 1993 – Mr Thomas
- 1994 – Everyone is Jesus / Coca-cola Angel / Everyone is Jesus (Dancing mantra mix) / Everyone is Jesus (Meditation mix)
- 1995 – Love the children / Say yes
- 1996 – Den glada stjärnan / Happy star / Happy star (Spacepeace remix) / Golden ray
- 1997 – Svarta pärlan i London / Spelar helt normal / Svarta pärlan (Röd remix) / Hjälpa till
- 1997 – Regnbågsdiamant / Maya / 303 / Den enda här på jorden
- 1999 – Miraklet / Den oemotståndlige
- 2000 – Vi får vingar när vi älskar/Rymdens Ros
- 2000 – Solsjäl/Håll mig
- 2000 – Man av färger/Paradisbröllop
- 2004 – Vad är frihet?/Långt Inuti
- 2004 – Tiden faller
- 2006 – Ingen kan köpa livet
- 2008 – Öppna ditt Hjärta
- 2009 – Hopp och Förtvivlan
- 2009 – Let's Dance
- 2010 – Another Day In Paradise
- 2011 – Välkommen Hem

=== Others ===
- Fred i rörelse, a free song from Di Leva's website.
- Jag äter inte mina vänner, song with Refused on Djurens rätts compilation album Defenders of the oppressed breed.
- Stolt, song with Lars Demian on his record Elvis & Jesus & jag.
- Vad bryr sig kärleken, song with Mikael Wiehe on his record Sevilla.
- Kom och håll om mig, duet with Nike Gurra on the record Hula Hula [1987].

== Television, theatre, etc. ==
=== Television ===
- Sommarmorgon, TV 1, 1985
- Smash!, TV 1, 1989
- Kenny Starfighter, TV 1, 1994

=== Radio ===
- Sommar, P1, 1987
- Alkemisternas blandning, 1991
- Sommar, P1 Tuesday June 10 13:05, 1997

=== Theatre ===
- Mahagonny (Berthold Brecht/Director: Peter Haber) theatre in Gävleborg, 1987
- Hamlet (William Shakespeare/Director: Peter Oskarson) Folk theatre in Gävleborg 1989-90

=== Film ===
- I morgon & i morgon & i morgon. (Director: Stig Björkman, 1989)

=== Publications ===
- Nu [1988]
- Contribution to B Åkerlunds book Insida – svenska personligheter. [1992]
- Prologue in T Jönssons book Tarot, den inre världsomseglingen. [1996]
