= Hold Me Closer (Cornelia Jakobs song) =

2022 song by Cornelia Jakobs

Single by Cornelia Jakobs
- Released: 26 February 2022
- Length: 3:19 (single); 3:00 (Eurovision version)
- Label: Freebird Entertainment
- Songwriters: Cornelia Jakobsdotter; David Zandén; Isa Molin

Cornelia Jakobs singles chronology
"Weight of the World" (2020)	"Hold Me Closer" (2022)	"Fine" (2022)

Music video
- "Hold Me Closer" on YouTube

Eurovision Song Contest 2022 entry
- Country: Sweden
- Artist: Cornelia Jakobs
- Languages: English
- Composers: Cornelia Jakobsdotter; David Zandén; Isa Molin
- Lyricists: Cornelia Jakobsdotter; David Zandén; Isa Molin

Finals performance
- Semi-final result: 1st
- Semi-final points: 396
- Final result: 4th
- Final points: 438

Entry chronology
- ◄ "Voices" (2021)
- "Tattoo" (2023) ►

"Hold Me Closer" is a song by Swedish singer and songwriter Cornelia Jakobs, released as a single on 26 February 2022. It represented Sweden at the Eurovision Song Contest 2022 in Turin, Italy, after winning the Melodifestivalen 2022 final with 146 points. At Eurovision, Jakobs performed 17th of the 18 acts in the second semi-final, where she qualified for the grand final. In the grand final, she performed 20th of 25th acts and finished in fourth place in the Eurovision grand final with 438 points.

The song was Sweden's best performing song at Eurovision in the seven years since their last victory and scored the most points ever received by a Swedish entry in the grand final before being surpassed by next year's entry, "Tattoo".

== Eurovision Song Contest ==
Jakobs was announced as a participant in Melodifestivalen 2022, the Swedish national selection for the Eurovision Song Contest, with the song "Hold Me Closer" on 26 November 2021. Drawn to compete in the first heat on 5 February 2022, following a technical glitch during the show's broadcast, voting through the competition's mobile app failed and only telephone votes were counted during the heat as a result, despite telephone votes typically making up just one of eight voting categories which determine qualification at Melodifestivalen. "Hold Me Closer" ultimately received the most telephone votes during the heat, leading to Jakobs and the song qualifying directly to the final. The final was later held on 12 March, where "Hold Me Closer" went on to win the competition, receiving the most points from the international juries and second-most points from the Swedish public.

As the winner of Melodifestivalen, Jakobs represented Sweden at the Eurovision Song Contest 2022 in Turin with "Hold Me Closer". The song competed in the second semi-final on 12 May, where it qualified to the final after placing first in the semi-final, receiving the highest number of points from both the juries of music professionals and the viewing public. Going into the final, Sweden was considered one of the frontrunners to win the competition, and was awarded the Composer Award by the European Broadcasting Union (EBU) at the Marcel Bezençon Awards, voted on by the participating composers for the best and most original composition. The final was held on 14 May, where Sweden placed fourth overall, placing second with the juries and sixth with the public.

== Awards and nominations ==
Awards and nominations for "Hold Me Closer"
Year	Organization	Award	Result	Ref.
2022	Marcel Bezençon Awards	Composer Award	Won	
2022	Rockbjörnen	Swedish Song of the Year	Won	
2022	Musikplats Stockholm	Song of the Year	Won	
2022	Musikförläggarnas Pris	Song of the Year	Won	
2023	Grammis	Song of the Year	Nominated	

== Charts ==
=== Weekly charts ===
Weekly chart performance for "Hold Me Closer"
Chart (2022)	Peak position
Australia Digital Tracks (ARIA)	41
Finland (Suomen virallinen lista)	9
Germany Download (Official German Charts)	7
Global Excl. US (Billboard)	132
Greece International (IFPI)	50
Iceland (Tónlistinn)	2
Ireland (IRMA)	38
Lithuania (AGATA)	5
Lithuania (AGATA) Eurovision version	49
Netherlands (Single Top 100)	76
Norway (VG-lista)	15
Portugal (AFP)	135
Spain (PROMUSICAE)	88
Sweden (Sverigetopplistan)	1
Switzerland (Schweizer Hitparade)	53
UK Singles (OCC)	59

=== Year-end charts ===
Year-end chart performance for "Hold Me Closer"
Chart (2022)	Position
Sweden (Sverigetopplistan)	7

== Certifications ==
Certifications for "Hold Me Closer"
Region	Certification	Certified units/sales
Streaming
Sweden (GLF)	3× Platinum	24,000,000^{†}
^{†} Streaming-only figures based on certification alone.
