= Youngblood (group) =

Swedish band

- Origin: Sweden
- Genres: Pop
- Years active: 2011–present
- Label: EMI
- Members: Christer Sjølie af Geijerstam; Henric Flodin; Marcus Sjöstrand; Oskar Kongshöj; Simon Johansson
- Website: www.youngbloodworld.com

Youngblood is a Sweden-based boy band made up of 5 members from both Sweden and Norway. Members are Christer Sjølie af Geijerstam, Henric Flodin, Marcus Sjöstrand, Oskar Kongshöj and Simon Johansson. They are signed to the EMI record label.

The band was launched by Swedish singer/composer Fredrik Kempe, and took part in Melodifestivalen 2012 with the song "Youngblood" written by Kempe with David Kreuger and reached the Andra Chansen show in Nyköping, where they faced Sean Banan and failed to qualify to the second round.

Their debut was the single "Blame It on You" by Alexander Kronlund and Quiz & Larossi. They released their debut album Running Home to You immediately after their appearance on Melodifestivalen and release of "Youngblood" their song in the competition.

Following the release of Running Home to You on 7 March 2012, the band embarked on a promotional tour throughout Sweden.

== Discography ==
=== Albums ===
| Year | Album | Peak Position | Certifications | Notes |
| Year | Album | SWE | Certifications | Notes |
|---|---|---|---|---|
| 2012 | Running Home to You | 7 | | |

=== Singles ===
| Year | Single | Peak Position | Album |
| Year | Single | SWE | Album |
|---|---|---|---|
| 2011 | "Blame It on You" | – | Running Home to You |
| 2012 | "Youngblood" | 37 | Running Home to You |
| 2012 | "American Girlfriend" | – | Running Home to You |
