= Top Cats =

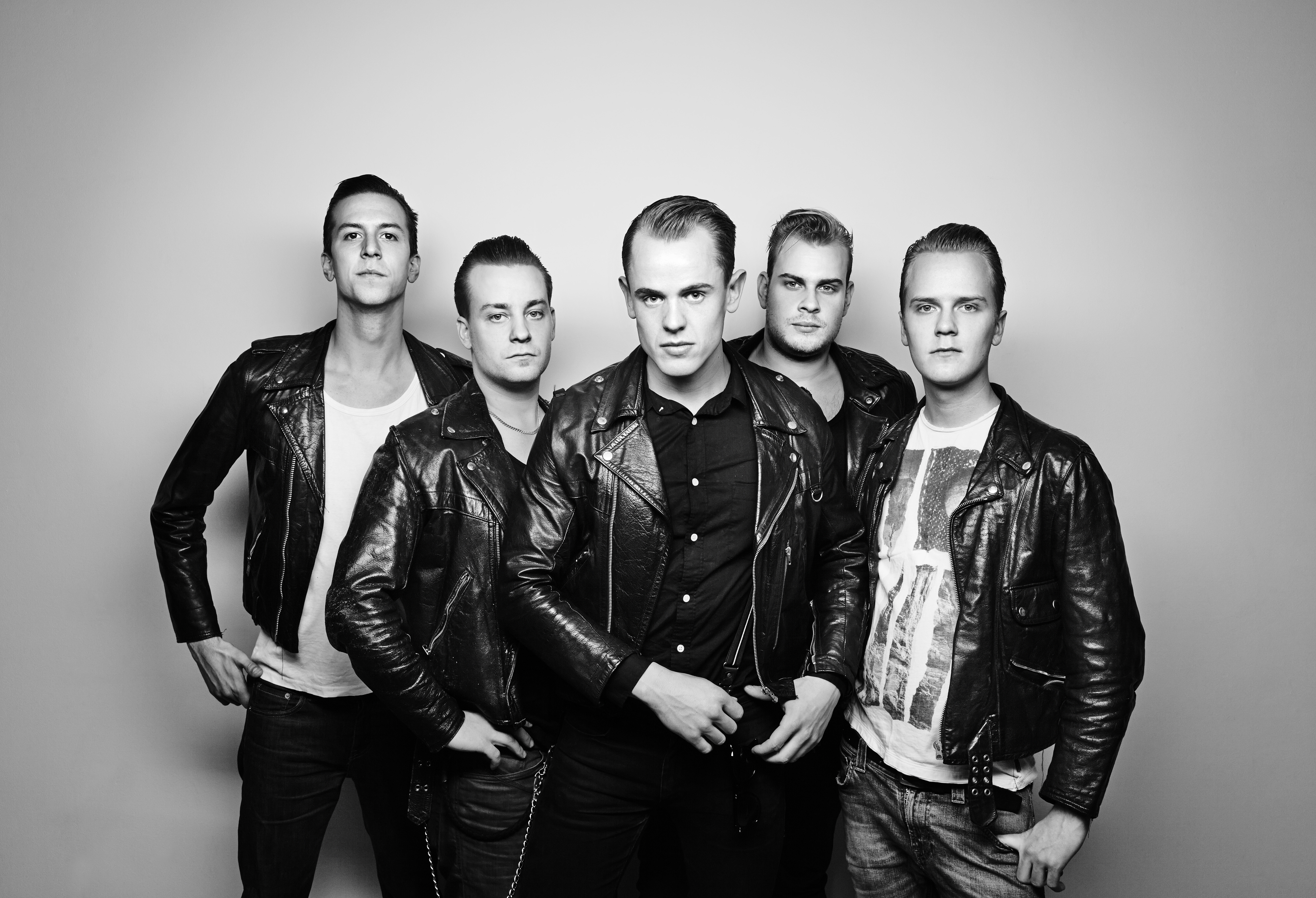
- Top Cats in January 2013

Background information
- Origin: Torsby, Sweden
- Genres: Rockabilly
- Years active: 2001–present
- Labels: TC Entertainment
- Members: Jon Kleppenes; Fredrik Lilja; Robert Jansson; Martin Lindahl
- Past members: Daniel Kjellberg; Henrik Törnevik; Patrik Pantzar; Olle Sätterström
- Website: topcats.se

Top Cats is a Swedish rockabilly band formed Torsby in 2001. The earliest line-up was made up of Jon Kleppenes (as lead singer), Daniel Kjellberg (drummer), Henrik Törnevik (contrabass), Fredrik Lilja (guitar), Olle Sätterström (guitar, trumpet, piano), Erica Larsson and Sandra Zackrisson (both backing vocals). When in 2004 drummer Daniel Kjellberg left, he was replaced by Robert Jansson. In 2007, double bassist Henrik Törnevik left and was replaced by Martin Lindahl.

The band took part in Melodifestivalen 2012 with "Baby Doll" written by Mårten Eriksson, Lina Eriksson and Susie Päivärinta and made it to the final after winning a spot from the "second chance" round alongside Thorsten Flinck & Revolutionsorkestern. In the final they finished in sixth place.

In 2015 Top Cats started their own record label TC entertainment.

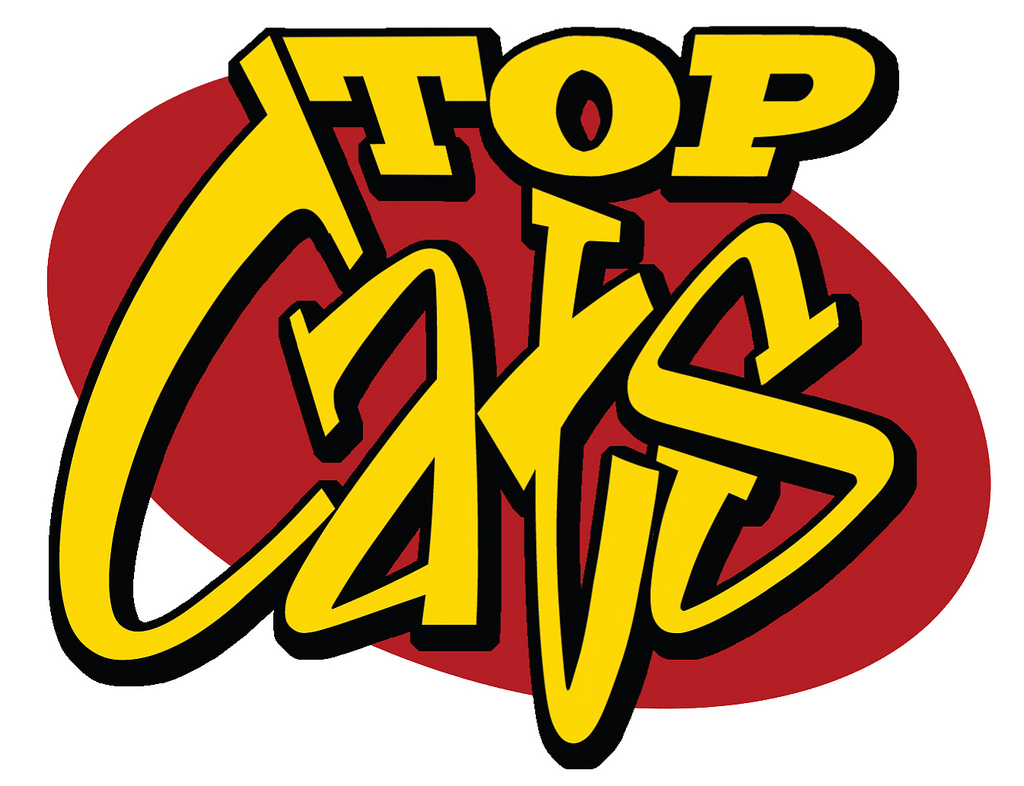
Top Cats logo

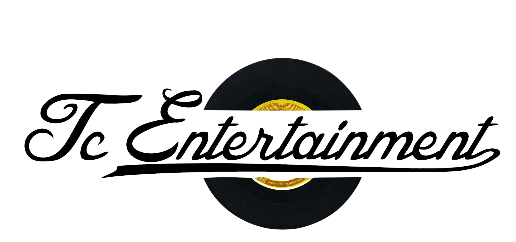
Tc Entertainment logo

At the new label, Top Cats released the Kick Down record that was recorded in King's side studio in Gnesta.

Two years later, the band released its first EP "in the middle of the night", which was partly recorded in the band's private studio, located in a barn in northern Värmland.

New music is recorded in 2018 and as the first single, Piece of my Heart was released in June.

== Discography ==
=== Albums ===
Title	Year	Peak	Certification
Title	Year	SWE	Certification
Heartache	2011	2	
No More Heartache	2012	12	
Smashing to the Ground	2013	1	
Kick Down	2015	18	

=== Singles ===
Title	Year	Peak	Certification	Album
Title	Year	SWE	Certification	Album
"Heartache"	2011	—		No More Heartache
"Baby Doll"	2012	20		No More Heartache
"Sad But True"	2012	—		
"Romeo"	2013	—		Smashing to the Ground
"Det kan väl inte jag rå för"	2013	—		
"Howlin Mama"	2015	—		Kick Down
"Rock This Town"	2016	—		In the Middle of the Night (EP)
"Stuck Under the Misteltoe"	2016	—		
"In the Middle of the Night"	2017	—		In the Middle of the Night (EP)
"Piece of My Heart"	2018	—		
