= Björn Ranelid =

Swedish author

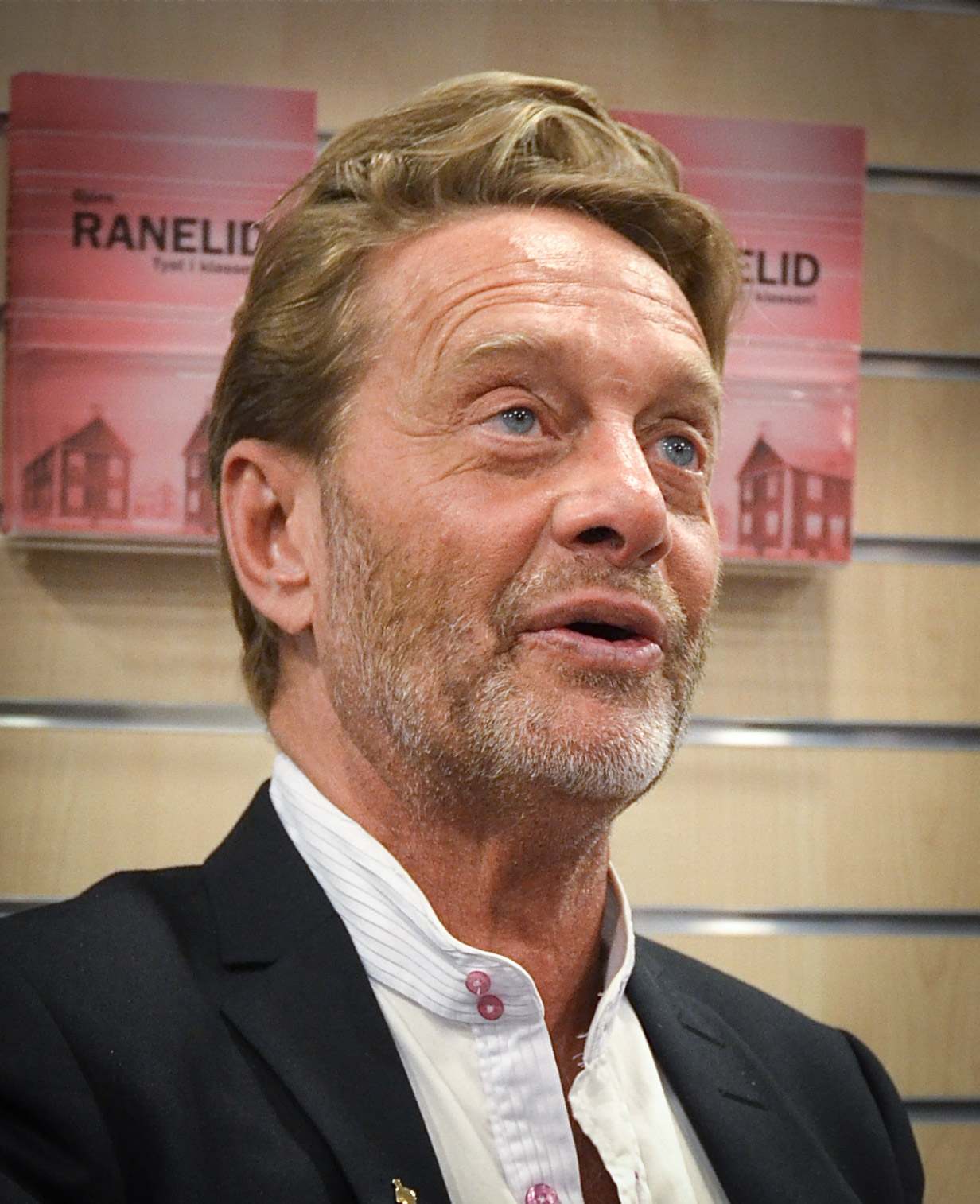
- Ranelid in 2012
- Born: Per Björn Sigvardson Ranelid; 21 May 1949 (age 77); Malmö, Sweden
- Education: Lund University
- Years active: 1983–
- Notable work: Synden
- Awards: August Prize; 1994 Synden
Association football career
Senior career*
Years	Team	Apps	(Gls)
- Håkanstorps BK
	Malmö FF	0	(0)
1970–1973	Helsingborgs IF	12	
- Trelleborgs FF
- * Club domestic league appearances and goals

Ranelid presenting himself at the Gothenburg Book Fair in 2013

Per Björn Sigvardson Ranelid (born 21 May 1949) is a Swedish author from Malmö. Since the beginning of his career in 1983, Ranelid has published twenty novels and written about five hundred articles in different magazines and newspapers. The author has also made numerous speeches throughout the years since his debut. He has been living in Stockholm since 1989.

His works have been translated into French, English, German, Norwegian and Finnish.

== Biography ==
=== Education and teaching career ===
Ranelid has been a postgraduate student in literature at Lund University. He has taught literature, Swedish, and philosophy at the high school level.

=== Football career ===
Ranelid played professional football for Malmö FF and Helsingborgs IF however only with limited appearances in each club's first team. He started as a youth player in Håkanstorps BK before moving to Malmö FF in his teenage years, Ranelid transferred to Helsingborgs IF in 1970.

=== Musical career ===
Ranelid took part in Melodifestivalen 2012 with "Mirakel". The lyrics are by Björn Ranelid himself and music by Fredrik Andersson. The song features Sara Li in vocals. The song reached the Final 10.

== Bibliography ==
- Den överlevande trädgårdsmästaren (1983)
- I glastiden (1985)
- David Hills obotliga minne (1987)
- Mellan mörker och ljus. Erik Höglunds 80-tal (1988)
- Påfågelns längtan (1989)
- Mördarens öga (1990)
- Mästaren (1992)
- Mitt namn skall vara Stig Dagerman (1993)
- Synden (1994)
- I Bögens namn (1994)
- Kärlekens innersta rum (1996)
- Till alla människor på jorden och i himlen (1997)
- Tusen kvinnor och en sorg (1998)
- Min son fäktas mot världen (2000)
- Krigaren (2001)
- David Puma och drottning Silvia (2002)
- Kvinnan är första könet (2003)
- Ord (2003)
- Bär ditt barn som den sista droppen vatten (2004)
- Lustmördarna (2005)
- Hjärtat som vapen (2006)
- Öppet brev till George W Bush: paradisets nycklar hänger i helvetet – en sann berättelse (2007)
- Ansikte av eld (2008)
- I Gift You My Finest Words: Aphorisms and Metaphors in Swedish, French, English and German (2009)
- Kniven i hjärtat (2010)
- Tyst i klassen! (2012)
- Förbjuden frukt från ett fruset träd (2013)
- Kärleken och de sista människorna på jorden (2014)
- Överbefälhavarens hemlighet (2016)

== Discography ==
- 2012: "Mirakel" (feat. Sara Li) (Melodifestivalen 2012)
