= Baby Doll (Top Cats song) =

Single by Top Cats
- Released: 2012
- Genre: Rockabilly
- Songwriter(s): Mårten Eriksson, Lina Eriksson, Susie Päivärinta

Top Cats singles chronology
| "Heartache" (2011) | "Baby Doll" (2012) | "Sad But True" (2012) |

"Baby Doll" is a song written by Mårten Eriksson, Lina Eriksson and Susie Päivärinta. The song was performed in the second semifinal of Melodifestivalen 2012 by the Top Cats. From Andra chansen the song made it to the finals inside the Stockholm Globe Arewna, where it ended up 6th.

On 22 April 2012, the song entered Svensktoppen.

== Charts ==
| Chart (2012) | Peak position |
|---|---|
| Sweden (Sverigetopplistan) | 20 |
