= Youngblood (Youngblood song) =

Single by Youngblood

from the album Running Home to You
- Released: 2012
- Recorded: 2012
- Genre: Pop
- Length: 3:04
- Label: EMI
- Songwriters: Fredrik Kempe; David Kreuger

Youngblood singles chronology
"Blame It On You" (2012)	"Youngblood" (2012)

"Youngblood" is a song by the Swedish boy band Youngblood. The song is written by Fredrik Kempe and David Kreuger. They took part with the song "Youngblood" in the Melodifestivalen 2012, the selection process for vying to represent Sweden in the Eurovision Song Contest 2012 in Baku, Azerbaijan. The song peaked at number 37 on the Swedish Singles Chart.

== Release history ==
Even though Youngblood were not successful in the Melodifestivalen contest, the song still proved popular enough to be released as a single, as a follow-up to their debut single "Blame It On You". Both singles appeared on their debut studio album Running Home to You.

== Commercial performance ==
"Youngblood" peaked at number 37 on the Swedish Singles Chart.

== Chart performance ==
Chart (2012)	Peak position
Sweden (Sverigetopplistan)	37
