= Axel Algmark =

Swedish pop singer

- Born: 1990 (age 34–35); Tranås, Sweden
- Genres: Pop
- Years active: 2011–present

Axel Algmark (born in 1990) is a Swedish pop singer.

Although he is from Tranås, he is a resident of Örnsköldsvik. At 22, he took part in Melodifestivalen 2012 in a bid to represent Sweden in finals to be held in Baku, Azerbaijan. He presented the song "Kyss mig" (meaning Kiss me) co-written by Mattias Frändå, Jonathan Magnussen and Algmark himself in the fourth semi-final held on 25 February 2012 in Malmö Arena, Malmö. Although the song failed to qualify to the finals, it still proved popular with the public and upon release reached number 25 on the Swedish Singles Chart.

Prior to Melodifestivalen, he had won "Sjöviks Schlagerfestival prize" and "Svensktoppen nästa" for new artists, the latter through his own composition "Lördag". Algmark's band is composed of Daniel Swarts, Benjamin Karlsson, Karl Horgby, Ludwig Gustavsson and Ludvig Eriksson.

== Discography ==
=== Singles ===
Year	Single	Peak Position	Certification	Album
Year	Single	SWE	Certification	Album
2012	"Kyss mig"	25		TBA
