= Stockholm Syndrome (Swedish band) =

Swedish pop group

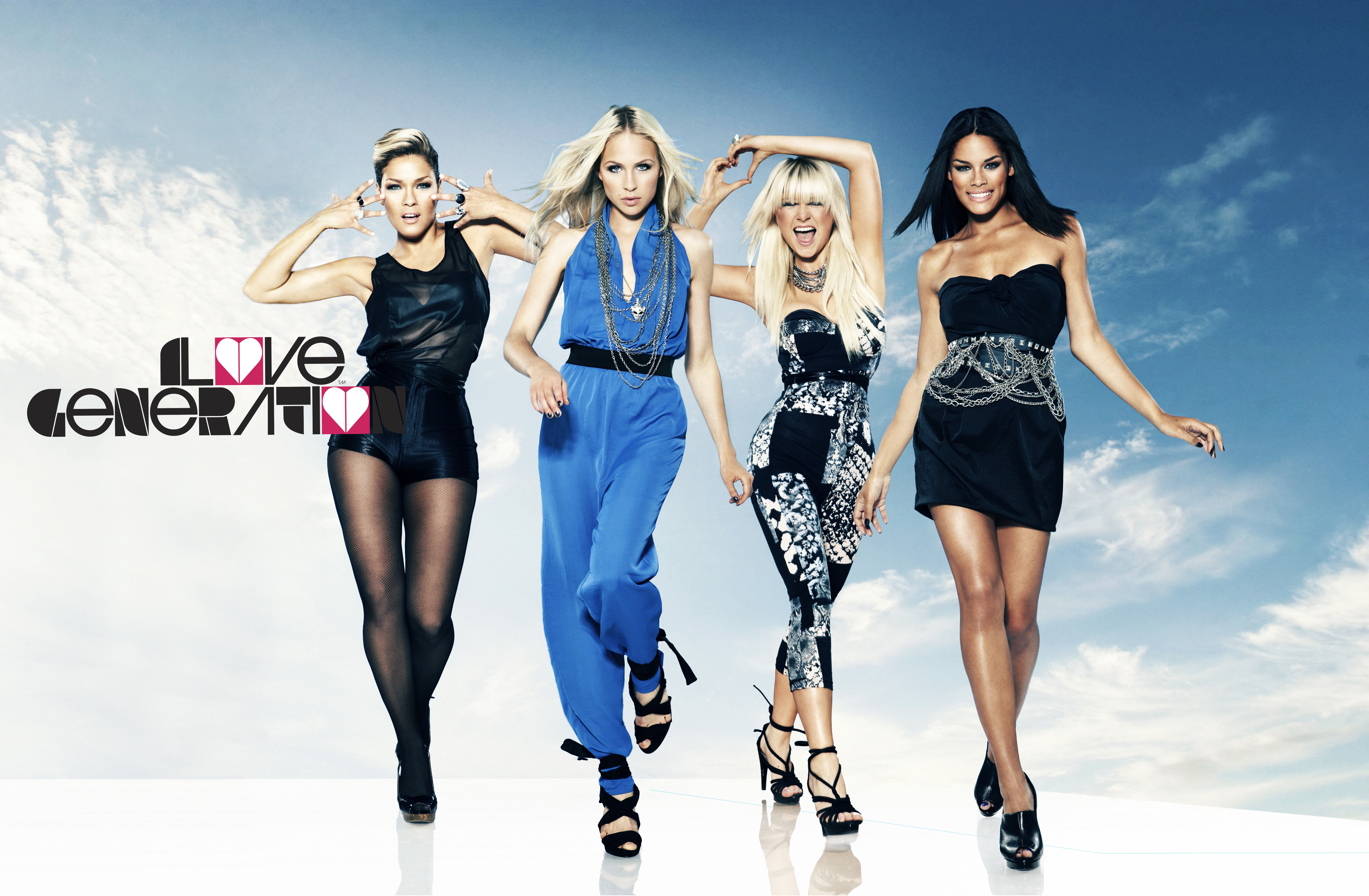
- Love Generation in 2010

Background information
- Also known as: Love Generation (until 2012)
- Origin: Sweden
- Genres: Pop, dance
- Years active: 2010–2016
- Labels: Legend Music Group with exclusive licence to Universal Music
- Past members: Cornelia Samuelsson; Martina "Charly Q" Braun Wolgast; Melanie Taylor; Mikaela Urbom; Roshana Hosseini
- Website: lovegeneration.se

Stockholm Syndrome, known until 2012 as Love Generation, was a Swedish female pop group and later duo, active between 2010 and 2016. The people behind the group were Moroccan hit producer RedOne, Swedish producer Jonas "JBK" Johnson and Peter Swartling, label Legend Music Group and Universal Music.

== History ==
=== 2010 ===
Through an audition with over 500 contestants, five girls got picked to form Love Generation. The making of their first self-titled single started the same day as the auditions were finished.

=== 2011 ===
Love Generation participated with "Dance Alone" in Melodifestivalen 2011, which selects the Swedish entrant for the Eurovision Song Contest. They placed 3rd in the fourth heat, therefore advancing to the Second Chance round. In the Second Chance round, they won duel 1 but lost duel 2 to Sara Varga, missing out on a place in the final.

=== 2012 ===
In 2012, they again participated in Melodifestivalen with the song "Just a Little Bit" in the third heat, however they only placed sixth in the heat, and were eliminated from the competition.

On 1 August, they announced that they would change their name to Stockholm Syndrome.

== Members ==
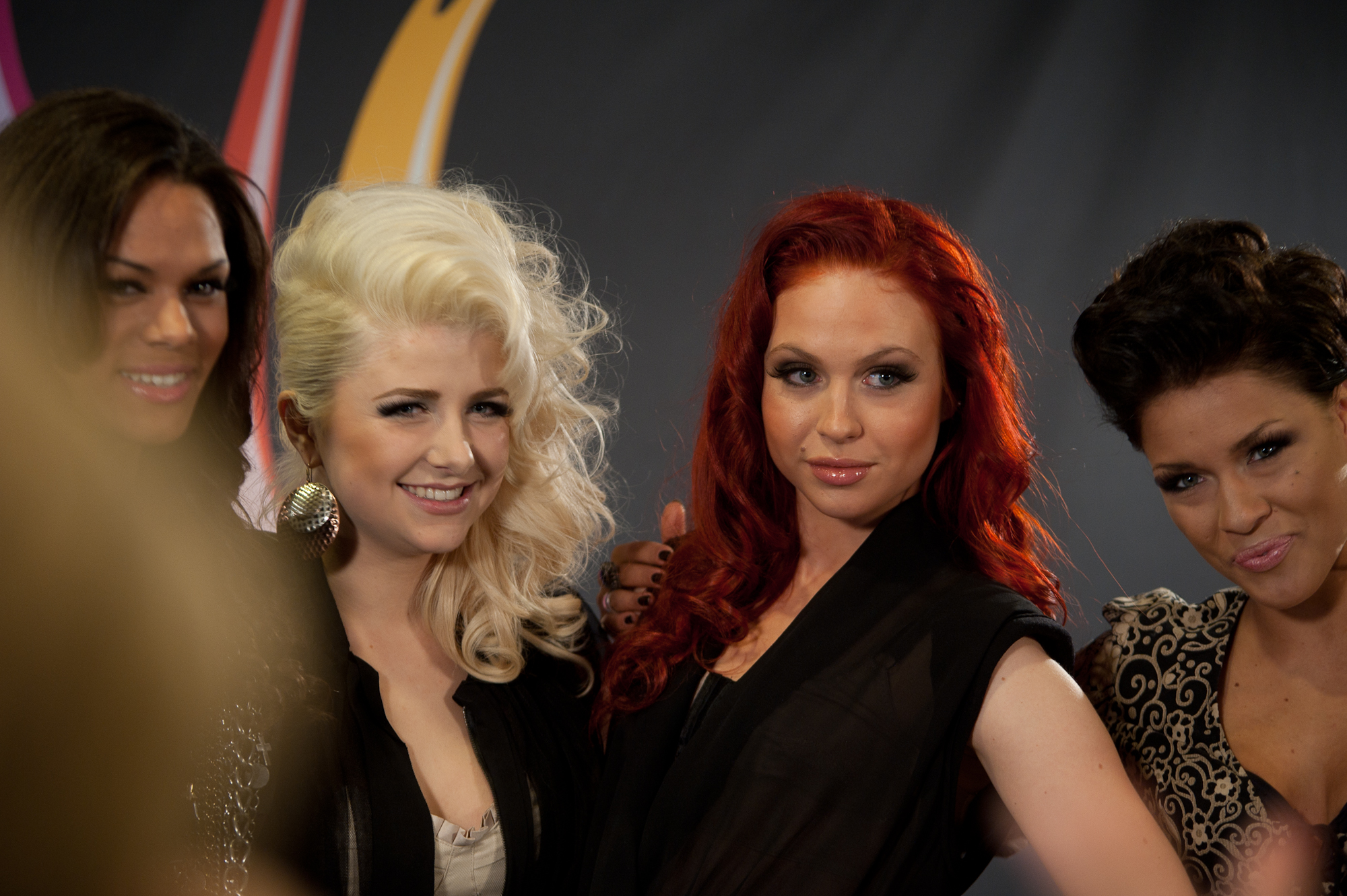
The group as Love Generation in 2010, consisting of (from left to right) Melanie, Cornelia, Mikaela and Charly Q

Roshana Hosseini left the group soon after the "Love Generation" music video was released, and later competed in Idol 2011.

Martina "Charly Q" Braun Wolgast is a Gothenburg girl and is a mix of Swedish, Austrian, African, and American descent. Her grandfather was a jazz musician and played with legends like Louis Armstrong. Martina "Charly Q" Braun Wolgast has lived in both Nice and Vienna. She sings, sews and paints, and is interested in all aspects of artistry, from the aesthetic and social aspects to the business side.

Mikaela Urbom is from southern Stockholm. Her sporting interests include football, running, tennis, dance and figure skating. Her brother, Alexander Urbom is a promising NHL ice hockey player. In 2011 Mikaela left the group, leaving them to continue as a trio.

Melanie Taylor also grew up in a sporting family – her mother played handball at an elite level, and father Jeff, an American, played in the NBA. Melanie chose music and besides singing, she has taken piano lessons and joined a music school. She has participated in productions of musicals and is also a talented songwriter.

Cornelia Jakobs is from Stockholm and grew up in a creative and somewhat Bohemian family because her parents worked in theater and music (her grandmother founded the People's Opera with her then-husband). Cornelia attended Kulturamas Music Dramatic elementary school and studied singing at Rytmus Musicians Gymnasium. Her father is Jakob Samuelsson of The Poodles. In 2022, she won Melodifestivalen as a solo artist and represented Sweden at the Eurovision Song Contest with the song "Hold Me Closer", where she placed fourth.

== Discography ==
=== Singles ===
Year	Single	Chart positions SWE	Album
2010	"Love Generation"	45	—
2011	"Dance Alone"	26	—
2012	"Just a Little Bit"	—	—
2012	"Pretty Girl"	—	—
2013	"Karma"	—	—
2013	"Hysteria" (with Young Squage)	—	—
2014	"Kalabalik"	—	—
2016	"Untouched Hearts" (with John Dahlbäck)	—	—

=== Music videos ===
- 2010 – Love Generation (3 July 2010)
- 2012 – Pretty Girl
- 2013 – Karma
- 2013 – "Hysteria" (with Young Squage)
- 2014 – "Kalabalik"
