= Rosvalla Nyköping Eventcenter =

Event arena in Nyköping, Sweden

Coordinates: 58°44′57″N 17°2′26″E

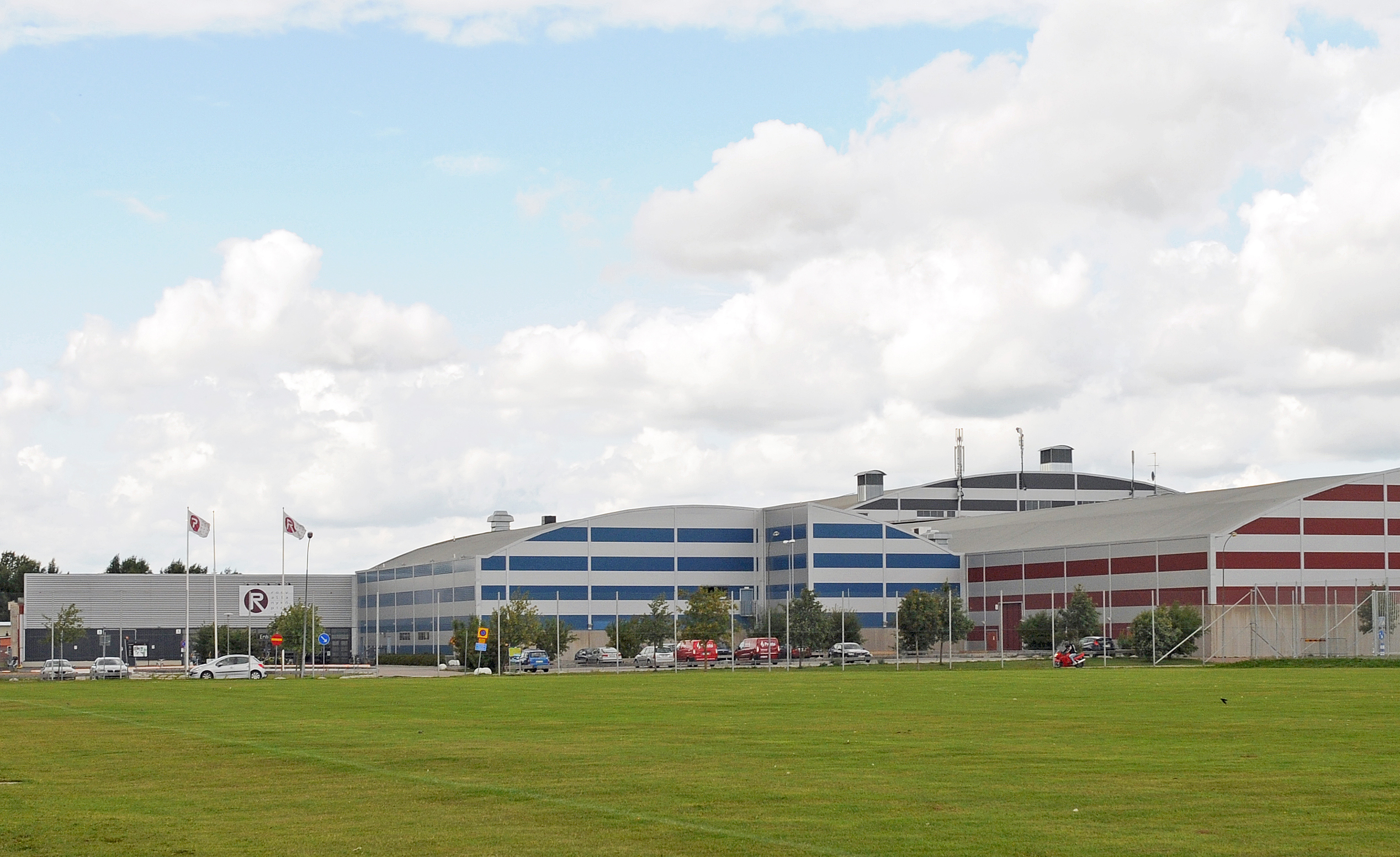

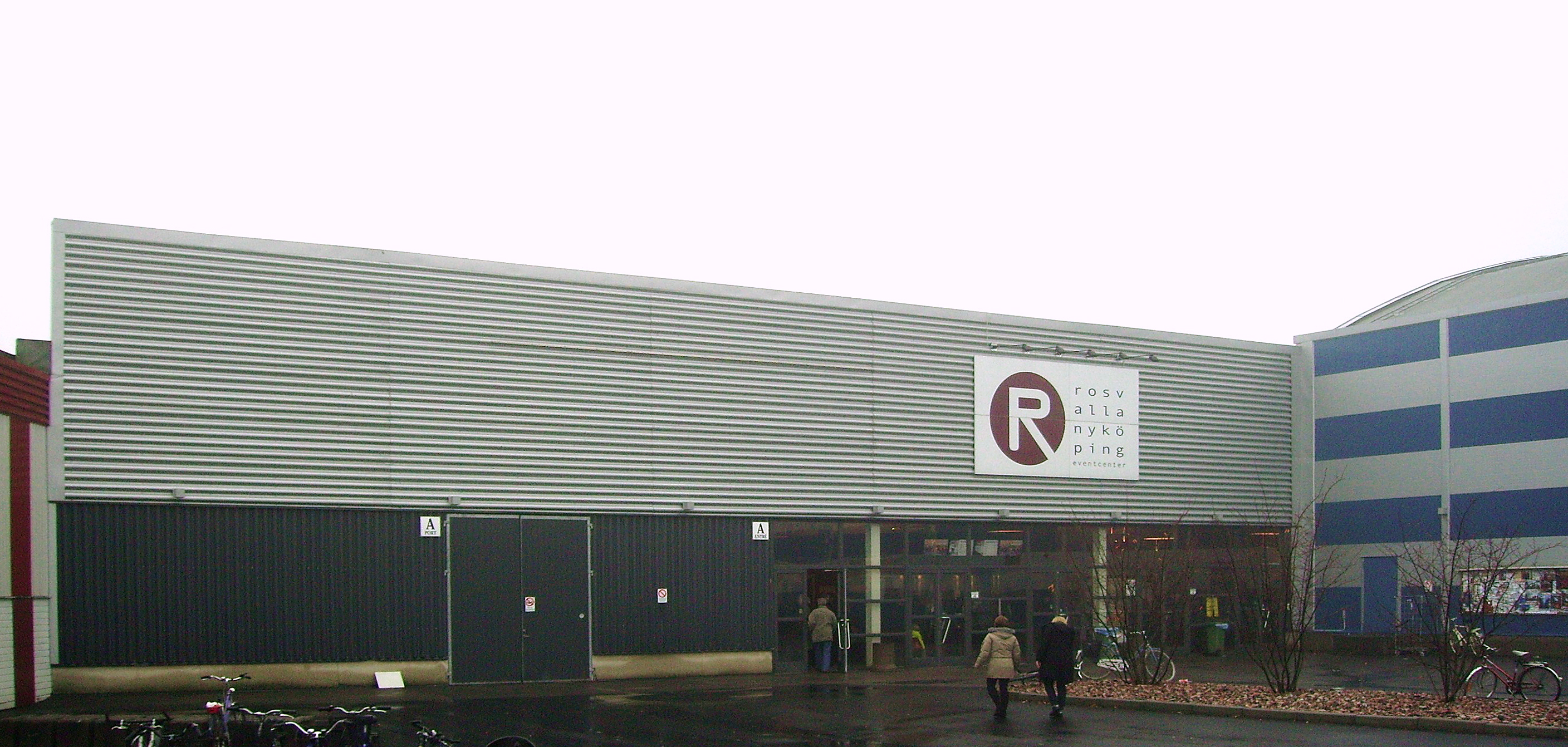

Nyköpings Arenor, Rosvalla is a sports and exhibition centre purely owned by the municipality of Nyköping and managed by Peab on behalf of Nyköping Sports and Exhibition Centre. The stadium includes indoor ice rinks, tennis courts, bowling lanes and a multi-purpose hall for sports, exhibitions and concerts. The facility, which opened in 2003, is home to the clubs; Nyköpings Hockey and Nyköpings BIS.

== Halls & arenas ==
Rosvalla Nyköping Eventcenter is made up of two ice halls, a bowling ball, gym, tennis courts, and conference halls of its indoor venues. However, the eventcenter also has outdoor venues that is made up of five eleven-man fields (two fields made of grass, and three fields with artificial grass), an American football field, a baseball field, and a boules court.

=== Hall-A ===
Hall-A is mainly used for sports such as handball, floorball, basketball, and volleyball. The maximum capacity for the hall is 2,000 spectators seated, and 3,000 standing.

=== Hall-B ===
Hall-B is equipped with marked lines on the floor and are mainly constructed for handball, floorball, basket, volleyball, badminton, and fustal.

=== Hall-C ===
Hall-C is also equipped with marked lines on the floor, just like Hall-B. It is located right next door to Hall-B.

=== Hall-C ===
Hall-C is mainly used for ping-pong and dance

=== Multihall ===
The multihall is mainly used for handball, but also have equipments used for athletics events. It has a capacity for up to 2,000 spectators, and is also equipped with a 200 meter long running track.

=== Small ice hall ===
The small ice hall has the same ice rink size as the larger indoor arena PEAB Arena. It is mainly used for hockey practices, tournaments, and figure skating. It has a capacity of 2,000 people, with 400 seated spectators and 1,600 standing spectators

== Major events ==
The centre has hosted the 'Second Chance' round in the Swedish Melodifestivalen three times, in 2007, 2012 and 2019.
