= Abalone Dots =

Swedish bluegrass and country musical group

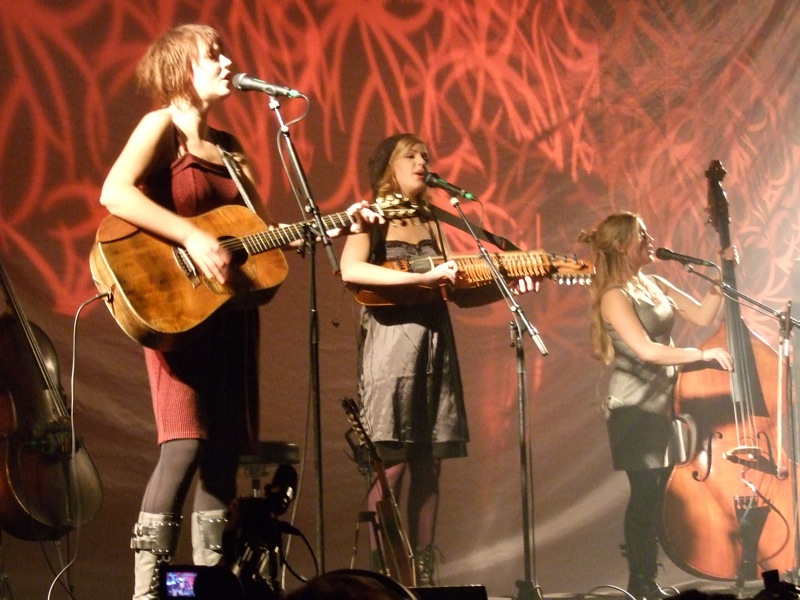
- Abalone Dots in concert in Luleå (2007)

Background information
- Origin: Västervik, Sweden
- Genres: Bluegrass
- Years active: 2000-present
- Labels: Sony BMG
- Members: Rebecka Hjukström; Sophia Hogman; Louise Holmer
- Past members: Elin Mörk
- Website: abalonedots.se

Abalone Dots is an all-female Swedish bluegrass and country musical group.

Three of the group's members met in Västervik in 2000 forming the group "Avalanche" with a repertoire of bluegrass music. The group changed it to Abalone Dots when they discovered existence of another group called Avalanche. The original trio was expanded in 2003 to include a new member becoming a quartet and travelled to Tanzania to take part in Music Crossroads Festival in Dar es Salaam. followed by various bluegrass festivals in the United States. Their appearance in summer of 2005 at the bluegrass festival in Torsåker in Gästrikland gave them wider exposure as Sveriges Television recorded a documentary on the event. After their appearance on national TV, the group was signed to Sony BMG with a brand the band called "softgrass" and in 2007, joined Lars Winnerbäcks in a tour.

The band's debut album was From a Safe Distance in 2007 on RCA / Sony BMG, that included collaborations with Marit Bergman particularly in the song "Long Lonely Road" about human trafficking. "In the Rain" featured Kristofer Åström. The album reached #7 on the Swedish Albums Chart prompting the band to release a new album Traveler the following year 2008 produced by Al Perkins which reached #8. The band went on to win the Swedish Grammy Awards at the Grammisgalan in 2009 as "Best New Folk / Show" Elin Mörk left the band in 2010 to continue her studies returning Abalone Dots into a trio.

The band took part in the Melodifestivalen 2012 in a bid to represent Sweden in the Eurovision Song Contest with the song "På väg", but failed to make it to the final round.

== Members ==
- Rebecka Hjukström (vocals, guitar, banjo, dobro)
- Sophia Hogman (vocals, mandolin, cello, nyckelharpa)
- Louise Holmer (vocals, double bass, piano)

Former member

- Elin Mörk (vocals, violin, viola)

== Discography ==
=== Albums ===
Year	Album	Peak chart positions	Certifications
Year	Album	SWE	Certifications
2007	From a Safe Distance	7	
2008	Traveler	8	
2012	Chocolate & Cigarettes	41	
2015	Red		
