= Jag reser mig igen =

Single by Thorsten Flinck & Revolutionsorkestern
- Released: 2012
- Genre: rock, blues, cabaret
- Length: 3:12
- Label: Columbia, Sony Music
- Songwriters: Ted Ström (lyrics), Thomas G:son (music)

Thorsten Flinck & Revolutionsorkestern singles chronology
"Hjärtats slutna rum" (2011)	"Jag reser mig igen" (2012)

"Jag reser mig igen" is a song with lyrics by Ted Ström and music by Thomas G:son. It was performed at Melodifestivalen 2012 by Thorsten Flinck & Revolutionsorkestern, and made it further through Andra chansen to the finals inside the Stockholm Globe Arena, where it ended up eight. With 8,4% of the televotes it became the viewers 3rd favourite song. On 6 May 2012, the song entered Svensktoppen.

== Charts ==
Chart (2012)	Peak position
Sweden (Sverigetopplistan)	38
