= Amazing (Danny Saucedo song) =

Single by Danny Saucedo
- Released: 26 February 2012
- Recorded: 2011
- Genre: Pop, dance
- Label: Columbia
- Songwriter(s): Danny Saucedo, Peter Boström, Figge Boström

Danny Saucedo singles chronology
"Tonight" (2011)	"Amazing" (2012)	"All in My Head" (2012)

"Amazing" is a song by Swedish singer Danny Saucedo that he performed in Melodifestivalen 2012, where it reached the final and finished in second place. It was written by Saucedo himself with Peter Boström and Figge Boström and was released as a digital download on 26 February 2012.

== Chart performance ==
On its release after the last semifinal on February 25, 2012, "Amazing" entered the Swedish Singles Chart at number 20 in its first week of release, and reached number two in its second week. The single subsequently peaked at number two on the chart. The single also entered the Turkish Singles Chart at number 70 for one week.

== Charts ==
Chart performance for "Amazing"
Chart (2012)	Peak position
Sweden (Sverigetopplistan)	2
Turkey (Turkish Singles Chart)	70
