= Why Am I Crying =

Single by Molly Sandén

from the album Unchained
- Released: 25 February 2012
- Genre: Pop; R&B
- Length: 3:01
- Label: EMI Music Sweden
- Songwriter(s): Molly Sandén; Aleena Gibson; Windy Wagner

Molly Sandén singles chronology
"Spread a Little Light" (2011)	"Why Am I Crying" (2012)	"Unchained/Mirage" (2012)

"Why Am I Crying" is a song written by Molly Sandén, Aleena Gibson and Windy Wagner. Participating in the third semifinal of Melodifestivalen 2012 in Leksand on 18 February 2012, the song made it directly to the finals inside the Stockholm Globe Arena on 10 March the same year. Once there, it ended up fifth.

The single was released on 25 February 2012, following the final semifinal. On 2 March 2012, the song debuted on the Swedish singles chart where it peaked at number 8 on 16 March the same year.

The lyrics were written before Molly Sandén broke up with Eric Saade in 2011.

The song also appeared on Molly Sandén's studio album Unchained, with both the original version and an acoustic version.

The song was featured in the second episode of Australian TV show, Ja'mie: Private School Girl.

== Charts ==
Chart (2012)	Peak position
Sweden (Sverigetopplistan)	12

== Certifications ==
Certifications for "Why Am I Crying"
Region	Certification	Certified units/sales
Sweden (GLF)	Platinum	40,000^{‡}
^{‡} Sales+streaming figures based on certification alone.
