= Melodifestivalen 2012 =

Swedish music competition

Dates and venues
- Heat 1: 4 February 2012
- Heat 2: 11 February 2012
- Heat 3: 18 February 2012
- Heat 4: 25 February 2012
- Second chance: 3 March 2012
- Final: 10 March 2012; Globen, Stockholm

Production
- Broadcaster: Sveriges Television (SVT)
- Director: Daniel Jelinek; Mikael Olander
- Presenters: Gina Dirawi; Sarah Dawn Finer; Helena Bergström

Participants
- Number of entries: 32: 8 in each heat; 10 in the final (2 from each heat, 2 from the Second Chance round)

Vote
- Voting system: 50% Jury, 50% SMS and telephone voting in the final. 100% SMS and telephone voting in the heats and Second Chance round.
- Winning song: "Euphoria" by Loreen

Melodifestivalen 2012 was a Swedish song contest that was held between 4 February and 10 March 2012. It selected the fifty-second Swedish entry to be internationally represented in the Eurovision Song Contest 2012 (ESC 2012).

As in the editions between 2009–2011, a maximum of eight people were allowed on stage, while only persons of 16 years or over are eligible. However, in accordance with Eurovision rules, only six people were allowed on stage for the Swedish entry at Eurovision. The main singer(s) were required to perform vocals live on stage. However, other backing vocals could be prerecorded, along with the song's backing track.

On 20 June 2011, Sveriges Television (SVT) announced an open call for Melodifestivalen 2012, with some changes in the rules. The first change was that only one web wildcard would be chosen online to compete in Melodifestivalen 2012. The participants could upload audio files instead of video files online.

The second change was that 16 songs were selected by the preliminary jury, with 15 being chosen by inviting specific composers, and another song from the chosen web wildcard, making a total of 32 songs again. The third change involved former Swedish Eurovision representative Christer Björkman being promoted from event producer to the executive producer of Melodifestivalen 2012. However, all songs were presented by SVT from October to December 2011.

For the web competition, authors could upload their audio file on SVT's website between 1–20 September 2011. There were separate categories in the upload for established composers and newcomers. A total of 3,485 songs were uploaded: 570 for the web wildcard and 2,915 for the annual contest.

Helena Paparizou was the guest of honor at the final of the festival. She sang a jazz-dance version of the song by Eric Saade "Popular".

== Format ==
The format of the 2012 Melodifestivalen was similar to the previous ten contests, with four heats, a second chance round, and a grand final. The four heats were held in Växjö (4 February), Gothenburg (11 February), Leksand (18 February) and Malmö (25 February). The second chance round was held in Nyköping on 3 March while the final in Stockholm was held on 10 March. SVT will present the competing songs during October–December 2011.

=== Schedule ===
| Date | City | Venue | Heat |
|---|---|---|---|
| 4 February | Växjö | VIDA Arena | Heat 1 in Småland |
| 11 February | Gothenburg | Scandinavium | Heat 2 in Västergötland |
| 18 February | Leksand | Tegera Arena | Heat 3 in Dalarna |
| 25 February | Malmö | Malmö Arena | Heat 4 in Scania |
| 3 March | Nyköping | Rosvalla Eventcenter | Second chance (Andra chansen) |
| 10 March | Stockholm | Globen | Final |

=== Changes ===
- In the web wildcard contest, it is only the song and not the artist who competes.
- The entries must be at least two minutes long.
- Foreign songwriters may submit entries to both the web wildcard contest and Melodifestivalen itself, but the songs must have at least one Swedish writer.

== Entries ==
32 songs competed in Melodifestivalen 2012. 16 of them were selected from a public call for songs, in which public songwriters and artists could send in songs to SVT, until 20 September 2011. The format for the contest remained the same as in 2011; the same format that was introduced in 2002. The 32 songs were first presented over four heats. A public televote was held to select two songs to progress directly to the final, with the third and fourth placed songs progressing to a Second Chance (Andra Chansen) round. The entries were presented on 9 November 2011. On 21 and 28 November 2011, SVT presented the artists for each song.

=== Web wildcard ===
As in the 2010 and 2011 contests, SVT held a web wildcard contest. SVT chose to do this for the public to directly choose a song in the competition. However, the difference from 2011 is that only one entry was chosen by the public, instead of two. From 1–20 September 2011, musicians with no previous music contract were able to submit songs to the SVT Melodifestivalen website. The contest was due to begin on 3 October and end on 7 November 2011.

Unlike the two previous years, it was only the song and not the artist (in combination with the song) that would compete. In addition, the requirement of having a video for the song was abolished. Since the winning song will not have an artist attached, it was SVT (in consultation with the winning song's writers) who decided which artist or group would present the entry in Melodifestivalen.

On 1 September 2011, SVT announced major changes in the web wildcard contest. A major change is that the public can only vote once in a voting round. The major change is that the contest is divided into a mini version of Melodifestivalen. It will become a contest with heats and a grand final.

Of the total 570 submissions of web wildcard entries, SVT will review them, and then select the 32 entries that will compete in the four heats. The first heat was held on 10 October. However, SVT revealed these entries one week earlier, on 3 October. The voting round was held on 10 October between 12:00 and 13:00 CET. The winning entry and one entry that SVT choose will go to the final. The remaining three heats will be held on 17 October, 24 October and 31 October. However, SVT will reveal the heat entries one week before each heat will begin. On 31 October, a total of eight songs will qualify for the final, which will be held on 7 November. Finals will be determined by telephone voting. It is not decided on the final will be broadcast live on SVT.

On 7 October 2011, SVT announced that four web wildcards were disqualified due to rule violations. All four songs had been published on other websites before the competition began, contrary to SVT's rules. However, on 14 October 2011, SVT disqualified the replaced song "No Games" by Leslie Tay. "No Games" was disqualified due to the writer having released music through a commercial record companies, in violation of the rules. The songs which have been disqualified are:

- "Set Me Free" - Trison (was not replaced).
- "Mary Doesn't Care" - My Niece (replaced by "She Is Love" - Fredrik Sjöstedt).
- "Stars Might Shine" - Albin Loán (replaced by "No Games" - Chris Mhina).
- "Fine" - My Niece (replaced by "Kärleken ler" - Ricky och Ronny).
- "No Games" - Chris Mhina (replaced by "Jag kommer ut" - San Francisco).

==== Rules ====
- Only non-established artists and songwriters can submit entries to the web wildcard contest.
- Authors who compete must not have had the musical works published previously (prior to 1 October 2011).
- During the contest, contestants entries only be published on the Melodifestivalen website. Authors must not publish entries to other websites in video format. The exception is that you link the song from SVT Play to other websites.
- SVT has the right to refuse entry to the competition if the audio file has bad sound quality.
- SVT has the right to refuse entry to the competition, if the content is considered offensive or violates the regular contest rules.

==== Heats ====
Voting in each heat will be held between 12:00 to 13:00 CET. Later in the afternoon, around 13:30 to 14:00 CET, SVT announce the winner and their own choice at Melodifestivalen website. However, SVT keep secret which finalists viewers chose and which SVT chose. The remaining songs will be eliminated. However, all songs in each heat will be released on Melodifestivalen website one week before the heat will begin. The heats will take place during these dates:

- Monday 10 October 2011 - Heat 1
- Monday 17 October 2011 - Heat 2
- Monday 24 October 2011 - Heat 3
- Monday 31 October 2011 - Heat 4
- Monday 7 November 2011 - Final

===== Heat 1 =====
| R/O | Artist | Song (English translation) | Songwriter(s) | Place | Result |
|---|---|---|---|---|---|
| 1 | Trison | "Set Me Free" | Tony Andersson, Martin Johansson | — | Disqualified |
| 2 | Billie Dee | "Wish You Luck" | Christian Lumbana | 5 | Eliminated |
| 3 | Keylas | "How About You?" | Oscar Lindstein | 7 | Eliminated |
| 4 | The Commoneers | "Your Majesty" | Mark Anthony Woznicki | 6 | Eliminated |
| 5 | Maria Klemetrud | "Catch Me" | Ditte Lindbom, Maria Klemetrud | 3 | Eliminated |
| 6 | Maria BenHajji | "I mina drömmar" (In my dreams) | Nanna Sveinsdóttir, Thomas Cars | 1 | Advanced |
| 7 | Flying Kite | "Seven Years" | Moa Rönnåsen, Robin William-Olsson | 4 | Eliminated |
| 8 | Grand Slam | "All Day All Night" | Peter Andersson, Andy Swaniz | 1 | Advanced |

===== Heat 2 =====
| R/O | Artist | Song (English translation) | Songwriter(s) | Place | Result |
|---|---|---|---|---|---|
| 1 | Keylas | "For the Win" | Oscar Lindstein | 6 | Eliminated |
| 2 | Nordic Shine | "What If" | Stefan Lebrot | 3 | Eliminated |
| 3 | Elin Jakobsson | "I'm Yours" | Jozsef Nemeth | 5 | Eliminated |
| 4 | David Nestander | "Beautiful Love" | Erik Kohl | 1 | Advanced |
| 5 | Kajsa Ingemansson | "Kitchen Floor" | Niclas Malmberg | 7 | Eliminated |
| 6 | Sören Karlsson | "Se mig som jag är (om du ser)" (See me as I am (if you see)) | Sören Karlsson | 8 | Eliminated |
| 7 | Unknown (Note: The songwriter for the song "A Heartbeat Away" chose not to present the demo artist to its song. Therefore, it is unknown who sings the song.) | "A Heartbeat Away" | Jonas Lundström | 1 | Advanced |
| 8 | Greta | "Through the Fire" | Margreta Sandkvist, Jim Wallenborg | 4 | Eliminated |

===== Heat 3 =====
| R/O | Artist | Song (English translation) | Songwriter(s) | Place | Result |
|---|---|---|---|---|---|
| 1 | Never Alone | "Marilyn Monroe" | Christofer Erixon, Joakim Björnberg | 1 | Advanced |
| 2 | Fredrik Sjöstedt | "She Is Love" | Fredrik Sjöstedt | 4 | Eliminated |
| 3 | Elin Jakobsson | "I Didn't Wanna Say Goodbye" | Jozsef Nemeth | 6 | Eliminated |
| 4 | Caroline Coquard | "Ingenting, ingen" (Nothing, no one) | Caroline Coquard | 1 | Advanced |
| 5 | Olle Andersson | "Dance It All Away" | Olle Andersson, Stefan Arnberg | 3 | Eliminated |
| 6 | Vilda | "Songbird" | Oliver Lundström, Johan Åberg, Robin Öman | 7 | Eliminated |
| 7 | Madeleine Ericson | "On the Top of the Mountain" | Madeleine Ericson | 8 | Eliminated |
| 8 | San Francisco | "Jag kommer ut" (I'm coming out) | Stefan Krakowski | 5 | Eliminated |

===== Heat 4 =====
| R/O | Artist | Song (English translation) | Songwriter(s) | Place | Result |
|---|---|---|---|---|---|
| 1 | Bowties | "Need to Know" | Erik Andergren, Erik Källner | 1 | Advanced |
| 2 | Ricky & Ronny | "Kärleken ler" (The love laughs) | Ronny Andersson | 8 | Eliminated |
| 3 | Trison | "Forever by Your Side" | Tony Andersson, Martin Johansson | 1 | Advanced |
| 4 | Felicia Vårnäs | "Not Over You" | Ditte Lindbom | 6 | Eliminated |
| 5 | Jenifer | "Letting Go" | Sofia Yxklinten | 5 | Eliminated |
| 6 | Patrick Egemo | "Higher" | Alexander Östman, Fredrik Langå | 3 | Eliminated |
| 7 | Vilda | "Box of Love" | Anton Fahlgren | 7 | Eliminated |
| 8 | Carolina Jakobsson | "Believe" | Carl Hansson, Emil Valtersson | 4 | Eliminated |

=== Web wildcard final ===
The final were held on November 7, 2011. It was broadcast live in the radio show P4 Extra with the host Lotta Bromé. The eight songs will be played in a quick review at approx. 13:20. The voting were held between 13:00 to 14:00. The results were revealed at approx. 14:33. The final draw:

| R/O | Artist | Song | Place |
|---|---|---|---|
| 1 | Maria BenHajji | "I mina drömmar" | 1 |
| 2 | David Nestander | "Beautiful Love" | 3 |
| 3 | Bowties | "Need to Know" | 2 |
| 4 | Caroline Coquard | "Ingenting, ingen" | 7 |
| 5 | Trison | "Forever by Your Side" | 8 |
| 6 | Grand Slam | "All Day All Night" | 5 |
| 7 | Unknown | "A Heartbeat Away" | 6 |
| 8 | Never Alone | "Marilyn Monroe" | 4 |

== Heats ==
The four heats were held in Växjö, Gothenburg, Leksand and Malmö. The jury, which chose the sixteen songs of around 3000 submissions, were selected at the end of September 2011. SVT's fifteen wild cards and the jury's choice were revealed on 9 November 2011. The web wildcard were chosen by viewers on 7 November 2011. SVT will announce the first sixteen artists on 21 November and the remaining sixteen artists on 28 November, during two press conferences. On the first press conference, the entries and artists for the first and second heat were revealed, however, on the second press conference, the entries and artists for the third and fourth heat will be revealed. It is not yet decided when the draw for each heat will be revealed.

On 21 November 2011, the first 16 artists were presented, which featured the return of several former Melodifestivalen artists: Loreen, The Moniker, the 2011 Melodifestivalen host Marie Serneholt, the 2002 Melodifestivalen winner Afro-Dite, Andreas Lundstedt, Sonja Aldén and Timoteij. It was also revealed that the song "Porslin" were replaced by the song "Shout It Out", due to SVT couldn't find the right artist for the song.

On 28 November 2011, the last 16 artist were presented, which also featured the return of several former Melodifestivalen artists like Mattias Andréasson and Danny Saucedo from the group E.M.D., in 2012 Melodifestivalen they will solo-compete and Charlotte Perrelli, winner of Eurovision Song Contest 1999. Other Swedish artists who will return to Melodifestivalen again are Love Generation, Andreas Johnson, Molly Sandén, Lotta Engberg and Christer Sjögren (in a duet) and Hanna Lindblad. The rock band Dynazty, which performed the 2010 winning song "This is my life" in the 2011 Melodifestivlen final, will also compete in 2012. The song "To the sky" were replaced by the song "Amazing".

The rules for the heats will be like last year, but with some changes. In the first round the artists will sing their songs, and the public will telephone- and SMS vote. After the appearances will SVT have a quick review of the songs, subsequently terminated round. The five songs which have received most telephone (and SMS) votes will qualify for round 2.

The second round will only have a quick review of the songs with new telephone and SMS-voting round. However, the five songs will keep its votes from the first round. When the round has been terminated, the two songs which have received most votes will qualify for the final. The two songs placed third and fourth will qualify to the Second chance round in Nyköping. The songs placed 5th, 6th, 7th and 8th will be eliminated from the race.

=== Heat 1 ===
The first heat was held on 4 February 2012 in VIDA Arena, Växjö. The songs are in running order.

| R/O | Artist | Song | Songwriter(s) for music and lyrics | Votes | | | Place | Result |
| R/O | Artist | Song | Songwriter(s) for music and lyrics | Round 1 | Round 2 | Total | Place | Result |
|---|---|---|---|---|---|---|---|---|
| 1 | Sean Banan | "Sean den förste Banan" | Sean Simadi (Sean Banan) (m and l), Joakim Larsson (m and l), Hans Blomberg (m and l), Mårten Andersson (m and l) | 59,068 | 38,378 | 97,446 | 3 | Second Chance |
| 2 | Abalone Dots | "På väg" | Rebecka Hjukström (m and l), Sophia Hogman (m and l), Louise Holmer (m and l), Viktor Källgren (m and l) | 13,156 | — | 13,156 | 7 | Out |
| 3 | The Moniker | "I Want to Be Chris Isaak (This Is Just the Beginning)" | Daniel Karlsson (The Moniker) (m and l) | 10,776 | — | 10,776 | 8 | Out |
| 4 | Afro-Dite | "The Boy Can Dance" | Figge Boström (m and l), Catrine Loqvist (m and l), Johan Lindman (m and l) | 23,795 | 20,941 | 44,736 | 5 | Out |
| 5 | Dead by April | "Mystery" | Pontus Hjelm (m and l) | 49,851 | 48,668 | 98,519 | 2 | Final |
| 6 | Marie Serneholt | "Salt and Pepper" | Lina Eriksson (m and l), Mårten Eriksson (m and l), Figge Boström (m and l) | 18,092 | — | 18,092 | 6 | Out |
| 7 | Thorsten Flinck & Revolutionsorkestern | "Jag reser mig igen" | Thomas G:son (m and l), Ted Ström (m and l) | 45,192 | 44,438 | 89,630 | 4 | Second Chance |
| 8 | Loreen | "Euphoria" | Thomas G:son (m and l), Peter Boström (m and l) | 78,121 | 82,230 | 160,351 | 1 | Final |

=== Heat 2 ===
The second heat was held on 11 February 2012 in Scandinavium, Gothenburg. The songs are in running order.

| R/O | Artist | Song | Songwriter(s) for music and lyrics | Votes | | | Place | Result |
| R/O | Artist | Song | Songwriter(s) for music and lyrics | Round 1 | Round 2 | Total | Place | Result |
|---|---|---|---|---|---|---|---|---|
| 1 | Ulrik Munther | "Soldiers" | Ulrik Munther (m and l), Johan Aberg (m and l), Linnea Deb (m and l), Joy Deb (m and l), David Jackson (m and l) | 60,994 | 52,623 | 113,617 | 2 | Final |
| 2 | Top Cats | "Baby Doll" | Mårten Eriksson (m and l), Lina Eriksson (m and l), Susie Päivärinta (m and l) | 47,129 | 41,380 | 88,509 | 3 | Second Chance |
| 3 | Sonja Aldén | "I din himmel" | Sonja Aldén (m and l), Bobby Ljunggren (m and l), Peter Boström (m and l) | 12,246 | — | 12,246 | 6 | Out |
| 4 | Andreas Lundstedt | "Aldrig aldrig" | Niclas Lundin (m and l), Maria Marcus (m and l), Randy Goodrum (m and l) | 10,080 | — | 10,080 | 7 | Out |
| 5 | Timoteij | "Stormande hav" | Kristian Lagerström (m and l), Johan Fjellström (m and l), Stina Engelbrecht (m and l), Jens Engelbrecht (m and l) | 49,752 | 37,249 | 87,001 | 4 | Second Chance |
| 6 | David Lindgren | "Shout It Out" | Fernando Fuentes (m and l), Tony Nilsson (m and l) | 57,696 | 71,678 | 129,374 | 1 | Final |
| 7 | Mimi Oh | "Det går för långsamt" | Anton Malmberg Hård af Segerstad (m and l), Niclas Lundin (m and l) | 9,342 | — | 9,342 | 8 | Out |
| 8 | Thomas Di Leva | "Ge aldrig upp" | Thomas Di Leva (m and l) | 34,739 | 30,028 | 64,767 | 5 | Out |

=== Heat 3 ===
The third heat was held on 18 February 2012 in Tegera Arena, Leksand. The songs are in running order.

| R/O | Artist | Song (English translation) | Songwriter(s) for music and lyrics | Votes | | | Place | Result |
| R/O | Artist | Song (English translation) | Songwriter(s) for music and lyrics | Round 1 | Round 2 | Total | Place | Result |
|---|---|---|---|---|---|---|---|---|
| 1 | Youngblood | "Youngblood" | Fredrik Kempe (m and l), David Kreuger (m and l) | 26,674 | 23,285 | 49,959 | 4 | Second Chance |
| 2 | Maria BenHajji | "I mina drömmar" (In my dreams) | Nanna Sveinsdóttir (l), Thomas Cars (m) | 8,720 | — | 8,720 | 8 | Out |
| 3 | Mattias Andréasson | "Förlåt mig" (Forgive me) | Mattias Andréasson (m and l) | 24,734 | 23,485 | 48,219 | 5 | Out |
| 4 | Love Generation | "Just a Little Bit" | Nadir Khayat (RedOne) (m and l), John Mamann (m and l), Jean-Claude Sindres (m and l), Teddy Sky (m and l), Yohanne Simon (m and l), Bilal "The Chef" Hajji (m and l) | 18,081 | — | 18,081 | 6 | Out |
| 5 | Carolina Wallin Pérez | "Sanningen" (The truth) | Michael Clauss (m and l), Martin Bjelke (m and l), Carolina Wallin Pérez (m and l), F Dread (m and l) | 9,849 | — | 9,849 | 7 | Out |
| 6 | Andreas Johnson | "Lovelight" | Andreas Johnson (m and l), Peter Kvint (m and l) | 39,821 | 38,520 | 78,341 | 3 | Second Chance |
| 7 | Molly Sandén | "Why Am I Crying" | Molly Sandén (m and l), Aleena Gibson (m and l), Windy Wagner (m and l) | 46,310 | 48,834 | 95,144 | 1 | Final |
| 8 | Björn Ranelid feat. Sara Li | "Mirakel" (Miracle) | Fredrik Andersson (m), Björn Ranelid (l) | 38,964 | 41,205 | 80,169 | 2 | Final |

=== Heat 4 ===
The fourth heat was held on 25 February 2012 in Malmö Arena, Malmö. The songs are in running order.

| R/O | Artist | Song (English translation) | Songwriter(s) for music and lyrics | Votes | | | Place | Result |
| R/O | Artist | Song (English translation) | Songwriter(s) for music and lyrics | Round 1 | Round 2 | Total | Place | Result |
|---|---|---|---|---|---|---|---|---|
| 1 | Charlotte Perrelli | "The Girl" | Fredrik Kempe (m and l), Alexander Johnsson (m and l) | 42,226 | 38,680 | 80,906 | 5 | Out |
| 2 | OPA! | "Allting blir bra igen" (Everything will be fine again) | Michael Sideridis (m and l) | 7,017 | — | 7,017 | 8 | Out |
| 3 | Dynazty | "Land of Broken Dreams" | Thomas G:son (m and l), Thomas "Plec" Johansson (m and l) | 45,227 | 41,170 | 86,397 | 4 | Second Chance |
| 4 | Lotta Engberg & Christer Sjögren | "Don't Let Me Down" | Lasse Holm, Lars "Dille" Diedricson (m and l) | 45,732 | 44,021 | 89,753 | 3 | Second Chance |
| 5 | Hanna Lindblad | "Goosebumps" | Hanna Lindblad (m and l), Linda Sundblad (m and l), Tony Nilsson (m and l) | 19,009 | — | 19,009 | 7 | Out |
| 6 | Axel Algmark | "Kyss mig" (Kiss me) | Axel Algmark (m and l), Mattias Frändå (m and l), Jonathan Magnussen (m and l) | 31,193 | — | 31,193 | 6 | Out |
| 7 | Lisa Miskovsky | "Why Start a Fire?" | Lisa Miskovsky (m and l), Aleksander With (m and l), Bernt Rune Stray (m and l), Berent Philip Moe (m and l) | 49,690 | 52,390 | 102,080 | 2 | Final |
| 8 | Danny Saucedo | "Amazing" | Danny Saucedo (m and l), Peter Boström (m and l), Figge Boström (m and l) | 121,954 | 101,273 | 223,227 | 1 | Final |

=== Second Chance ===
The Andra Chansen (Second Chance) round was held on 3 March in Rosvalla Nyköping Eventcenter. Eight acts qualified for this round from the heats - the songs that placed 3rd and 4th. A duel format was used, with each song battling against another in order to remain in the contest, and qualify for the final on 10 March. However, this year SVT changed the duel meetings. 2007-2011 the duel meetings were determined before the contest began, which meant that SVT decided how the eight songs would be met. This year SVT held a draw before Second Chance began. The four songs which came 3rd were in one pot, and the four songs which came 4th were in one other pot. Then SVT drew the duel meetings. The rule was that a 3rd and 4th from the same heat could not meet in a quarterfinal duel.

==== First round ====
| Duel | R/O | Artist | Song | Votes | Result |
|---|---|---|---|---|---|
| I | 1 | Dynazty | "Land Of Broken Dreams" | 46,666 | Out |
| I | 2 | Top Cats | "Baby doll" | 75,114 | Second Round |
| II | 1 | Andreas Johnson | "Lovelight" | 60,969 | Out |
| II | 2 | Timoteij | "Stormande hav" | 69,883 | Second Round |
| III | 1 | Thorsten Flinck & Revolutionsorkestern | "Jag reser mig igen" | 109,526 | Second Round |
| III | 2 | Lotta Engberg & Christer Sjögren | "Don't Let Me Down" | 79,235 | Out |
| IV | 1 | Sean Banan | "Sean den förste Banan" | 138,034 | Second Round |
| IV | 2 | Youngblood | "Youngblood" | 63,984 | Out |

==== Second round ====
| Duel | R/O | Artist | Song | Votes | Result |
|---|---|---|---|---|---|
| I | 1 | Top Cats | "Baby doll" | 98,782 | Final |
| I | 2 | Timoteij | "Stormande hav" | 54,788 | Out |
| II | 1 | Thorsten Flinck & Revolutionsorkestern | "Jag reser mig igen" | 196,014 | Final |
| II | 2 | Sean Banan | "Sean den förste Banan" | 111,443 | Out |

== Final ==
The final of Melodifestivalen 2012 was held on 10 March 2012 at the Globe Arena in Stockholm. The two winners from each of the four heats and the two Second chance winners qualified for the final, a total of 10 songs. The winner was decided by a mix of televoting/SMS voting and jury voting.

On 3 March 2011, SVT announced the 11 international groups that made up the jury vote. Each jury group gives their points as follows: 1, 2, 4, 6, 8, 10 and 12 points. The votes from the Swedish public were calculated the same way as the previous year. The points given to each song from televoting were a percentage of 473 points (equally the same total as the combined jury vote). For example, if a song had received 10% of the vote, then it would have received 47 points. If two songs had ended up at the same position, the people's votes would have overrule the jury.

| R/O | Artist | Song | Juries | Televote/SMS/App | | | Total | Place |
| R/O | Artist | Song | Juries | Votes | Percentage | Points | Total | Place |
|---|---|---|---|---|---|---|---|---|
| 1 | David Lindgren | "Shout It Out" | 65 | 102,308 | 5.0% | 23 | 88 | 4 |
| 2 | Thorsten Flinck & Revolutionsorkestern | "Jag reser mig igen" | 3 | 172,715 | 8.4% | 40 | 43 | 8 |
| 3 | Dead by April | "Mystery" | 25 | 119,473 | 5.8% | 27 | 52 | 7 |
| 4 | Lisa Miskovsky | "Why Start a Fire?" | 21 | 77,559 | 3.8% | 18 | 39 | 9 |
| 5 | Top Cats | "Baby Doll" | 35 | 142,688 | 7.0% | 33 | 68 | 6 |
| 6 | Loreen | "Euphoria" | 114 | 670,551 | 32.7% | 154 | 268 | 1 |
| 7 | Ulrik Munther | "Soldiers" | 62 | 112,025 | 5.5% | 26 | 88 | 3 |
| 8 | Björn Ranelid feat. Sara Li | "Mirakel" | 1 | 103,200 | 5.0% | 24 | 25 | 10 |
| 9 | Molly Sandén | "Why Am I Crying?" | 55 | 94,525 | 4.6% | 22 | 77 | 5 |
| 10 | Danny Saucedo | "Amazing" | 92 | 458,388 | 22.3% | 106 | 198 | 2 |

Detailed International Jury Votes
| R/O | Song | Belgium | Bosnia and Herzegovina | United Kingdom | Estonia | France | Cyprus | Ireland | Malta | Norway | Germany | Ukraine | Total |
| R/O | Song | Belgium | Bosnia and Herzegovina | United Kingdom | Estonia | France | Cyprus | Ireland | Malta | Norway | Germany | Ukraine | Total |
|---|---|---|---|---|---|---|---|---|---|---|---|---|---|
| 1 | "Shout It Out" | 10 | 10 | 8 | 2 | 2 | 8 | | 12 | 10 | 2 | 1 | 65 |
| 2 | "Jag reser mig igen" | | 2 | | | | | | | 1 | | | 3 |
| 3 | "Mystery" | | 8 | | 1 | 6 | 1 | 4 | | 4 | 1 | | 25 |
| 4 | "Why Start a Fire?" | 4 | 4 | 1 | | 1 | | 2 | 1 | 6 | | 2 | 21 |
| 5 | "Baby Doll" | 1 | | 4 | 8 | | 4 | 6 | 2 | | 6 | 4 | 35 |
| 6 | "Euphoria" | 6 | 12 | 6 | 12 | 10 | 12 | 12 | 10 | 12 | 12 | 10 | 114 |
| 7 | "Soldiers" | 2 | | 10 | 6 | 4 | 6 | 8 | 8 | | 10 | 8 | 62 |
| 8 | "Mirakel" | | 1 | | | | | | | | | | 1 |
| 9 | "Why Am I Crying?" | 8 | 6 | 2 | 4 | 8 | 10 | 1 | 4 | 2 | 4 | 6 | 55 |
| 10 | "Amazing" | 12 | | 12 | 10 | 12 | 2 | 10 | 6 | 8 | 8 | 12 | 92 |
International jury spokespersons
Belgium – Sandra Kim; Estonia – Reimo Silovee; Cyprus – Klitos Klitou; United Kingdom – Simon Proctor; Bosnia and Herzegovina – Dejan Kukric; France – Bruno Berberes; Ukraine – Gina Dirawi; Malta – Peter Carbonaro; Germany – Torsten Amarell; Ireland – Julian Vignoles; Norway – Tooji

== Tredje Chansen ==
Tredje Chansen (Third Chance) is a web-contest organized by Sveriges Television. Thirty-two unsuccessful Melodifestivalen entries in the past ten years will have a third opportunity for a spot in the grand final. The third chance procedure is similar to the actual one, there will be four rounds of third chances (four heats), a last chance (second-chance) and the final. There will be ten participants in the grand final. The winner will be decided by internet viewers and an expert jury while the qualifiers from the heats will be decided by the internet viewers only.

The first edition of Third Chance took place in January 2012, when Melodifestivalen 2012 began. Every week fans from Sweden, Europe and the rest of the world could vote their favourite song with 2 winners from each round (total 8 songs) to the finals and 8 songs for a last chance with available 2 spots left for the final.

=== Semi-final 1 ===
| R/O | Artist | Song | Year | Votes | | Place | Result |
| R/O | Artist | Song | Year | Votes | Percentage | Place | Result |
|---|---|---|---|---|---|---|---|
| 1 | The Attic feat. Therese | "The Arrival" | 2007 | 1,001 | 6.88% | 7 | Out |
| 2 | Patrik Isaksson | "Faller du så faller jag" | 2006 | 1,463 | 10.06% | 5 | Out |
| 3 | Poets | "What Difference Does It Make" | 2002 | 2,087 | 14.35% | 3 | Last Chance |
| 4 | PayTV | "Trendy Discoteque" | 2004 | 1,247 | 8.57% | 6 | Out |
| 5 | Pain of Salvation | "Road Salt" | 2010 | 3,492 | 24.00% | 1 | Final |
| 6 | Dilba | "Try Again" | 2011 | 1,904 | 13.09% | 4 | Last Chance |
| 7 | Eskobar | "Hallellujah New World" | 2008 | 398 | 2.74% | 8 | Out |
| 8 | Velvet | "The Queen" | 2009 | 2,965 | 20.38% | 2 | Final |

=== Semi-final 2 ===
| R/O | Artist | Song | Year | Votes | | Place | Result |
| R/O | Artist | Song | Year | Votes | Percentage | Place | Result |
|---|---|---|---|---|---|---|---|
| 1 | Verona | "La Musica" | 2007 | 1,336 | 7.71% | 6 | Out |
| 2 | Uno & Irma | "God Morgon" | 2007 | 994 | 5.74% | 8 | Out |
| 3 | Anniela | "Elektrisk" | 2011 | 1,672 | 9.65% | 4 | Last Chance |
| 4 | Magnus Carlsson | "Live Forever" | 2007 | 4,030 | 23.26% | 1 | Final |
| 5 | BWO | "Gone" | 2005 | 1,162 | 6.71% | 7 | Out |
| 6 | Andrés Esteche | "Just Like A Boomerang" | 2003 | 1,395 | 8.05% | 5 | Out |
| 7 | Pauline | "Sucker For Love" | 2010 | 3,355 | 19.36% | 3 | Last Chance |
| 8 | Ola | "Love in Stereo" | 2008 | 3,385 | 19.53% | 2 | Final |

=== Semi-final 3 ===
| R/O | Artist | Song | Year | Votes | | Place | Result |
| R/O | Artist | Song | Year | Votes | Percentage | Place | Result |
|---|---|---|---|---|---|---|---|
| 1 | Bosson | "Efharisto" | 2004 | 3,681 | 18.88% | 2 | Final |
| 2 | Anna Sahlene & Maria Haukaas Storeng | "Killing Me Tenderly" | 2009 | 914 | 4.69% | 6 | Out |
| 3 | Roger Pontare | "Silverland" | 2006 | 1,888 | 9.68% | 5 | Out |
| 4 | Lasse Lindh | "Du behöver aldrig mer vara rädd" | 2008 | 776 | 3.93% | 7 | Out |
| 5 | Christian Walz | "Like Suicide" | 2011 | 2,219 | 11.38% | 4 | Last Chance |
| 6 | Kalle Moraeus & Orsa Spelmän | "Underbart" | 2010 | 2,511 | 12.88% | 3 | Last Chance |
| 7 | Maarja-Liis Ilus | "He Is Always On My Mind" | 2003 | 235 | 1.21% | 8 | Out |
| 8 | Loreen | "My Heart Is Refusing Me" | 2011 | 7,281 | 37.35% | 1 | Final |

=== Semi-final 4 ===
| R/O | Artist | Song | Year | Votes | | Place | Result |
| R/O | Artist | Song | Year | Votes | Percentage | Place | Result |
|---|---|---|---|---|---|---|---|
| 1 | Love Generation | "Dance Alone" | 2011 | 3,681 | 18.88% | 1 | Final |
| 2 | Josefine Nilsson | "Med hjärtats egna ord" | 2005 | 360 | 2.64% | 7 | Out |
| 3 | Magnus Uggla | "För kung och fosterland" | 2007 | 1,805 | 13.21% | 5 | Out |
| 4 | Melody Club | "The Hunter" | 2011 | 2,019 | 14.78% | 3 | Last Chance |
| 5 | Johnson & Häggkvist | "One Love" | 2008 | 1,975 | 14.46% | 4 | Last Chance |
| 6 | Autolove | "Bulletproof Heart" | 2004 | 487 | 3.57% | 6 | Out |
| 7 | Anna Maria Espinosa | "Innan alla ljusen brunnit ut" | 2010 | 328 | 2.40% | 8 | Out |
| 8 | Lili & Susie | "Show Me Heaven" | 2009 | 2,447 | 17.91% | 2 | Final |

=== Last Chance (Sista chansen) ===
| R/O | Artist | Song | Year | Votes | | Place | Result |
| R/O | Artist | Song | Year | Votes | Percentage | Place | Result |
|---|---|---|---|---|---|---|---|
| 1 | Dilba | "Try Again" | 2011 | 834 | 9.77% | 6 | Out |
| 2 | Poets | "What Difference Does It Make" | 2002 | 496 | 5.81% | 8 | Out |
| 3 | Anniela | "Elektrisk" | 2011 | 725 | 8.49% | 7 | Out |
| 4 | Pauline | "Sucker For Love" | 2010 | 1,530 | 17.92% | 2 | Final |
| 5 | Christian Walz | "Like Suicide" | 2011 | 1,205 | 14.11% | 4 | Out |
| 6 | Kalle Moraeus & Orsa Spelmän | "Underbart" | 2010 | 1,335 | 15.64% | 3 | Out |
| 7 | Johnson & Häggkvist | "One Love" | 2008 | 868 | 10.17% | 5 | Out |
| 8 | Melody Club | "The Hunter" | 2011 | 1,545 | 18.1% | 1 | Final |

=== Final ===
| R/O | Artist | Song | Year | Votes | | Place |
| R/O | Artist | Song | Year | Votes | Percentage | Place |
|---|---|---|---|---|---|---|
| 1 | Pain of Salvation | "Road Salt" | 2010 | 7,959 | 29.22% | 2 |
| 2 | Velvet | "The Queen" | 2009 | 985 | 3.62% | 8 |
| 3 | Magnus Carlsson | "Live Forever" | 2007 | 2,121 | 7.79% | 3 |
| 4 | Ola | "Love in Stereo" | 2008 | 773 | 2.84% | 10 |
| 5 | Loreen | "My Heart Is Refusing Me" | 2011 | 9,416 | 34.57% | 1 |
| 6 | Bosson | "Efharisto" | 2004 | 1,730 | 6.35% | 4 |
| 7 | Love Generation | "Dance Alone" | 2011 | 1,278 | 4.69% | 5 |
| 8 | Lili & Susie | "Show Me Heaven" | 2009 | 778 | 2.86% | 9 |
| 9 | Pauline | "Sucker for Love" | 2010 | 1,109 | 4.07% | 6 |
| 10 | Melody Club | "The Hunter" | 2011 | 1,092 | 4.01% | 7 |
