= Carolina Wallin Pérez =

Swedish pop and jazz singer (born 1982)

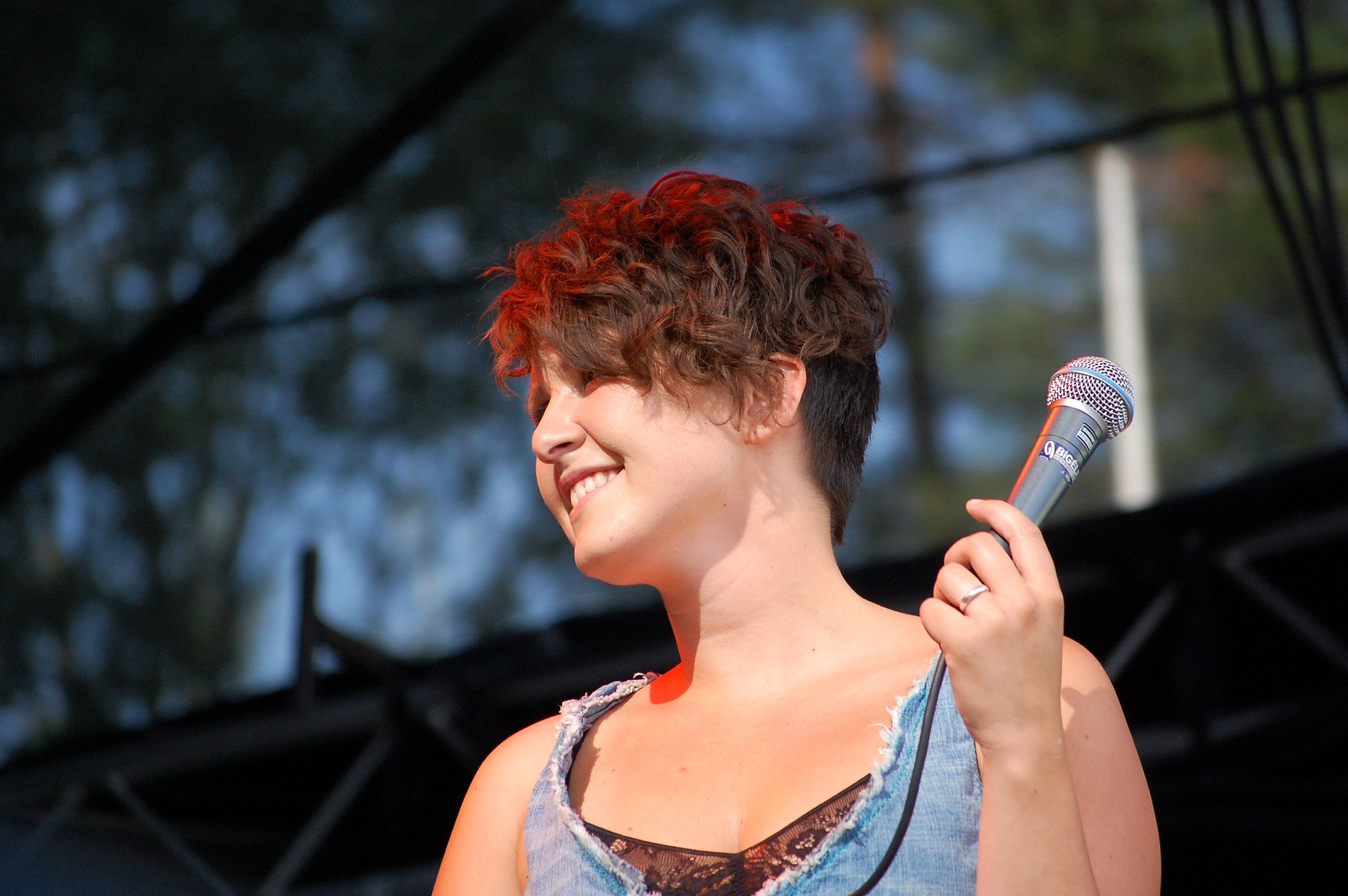
- Wallin Pérez performing in July 2010

Background information
- Born: 4 August 1982 (age 43); Mellerud, Sweden
- Occupation: Singer
- Years active: 2005–present
- Website: carolinawallinperez.com
- Musical career
- Genres: Pop; jazz
- Instrument: Vocals
- Label: Family Tree Music

Carolina Wallin Pérez (born 4 August 1982) is a Swedish singer.

She started in 2005 contributing vocals to the song "I Won't Stay" in the studio album Never Die! by the band Monster & Maskiners. Pérez became known through her music site on Myspace and was signed to Family Tree Music (a label distributed by Sony Music). She debuted in 2009 with the album Pärlor och svin with covers of Kent songs. The album produced by Fredrik Okazaki Bergstrom and recorded by Kent's producer Stefan Boman peaked at No. 23 on the Swedish Album Chart, and the single taken from the album "Utan dina andetag" reached No. 30 on the Swedish Singles Chart.

On 18 February 2012, Pérez took part in Melodifestivalen 2012 with the song "Sanningen" (meaning The truth), but did not qualify for the finals to represent Sweden in the 2012 Eurovision Song Contest in Baku, Azerbaijan

== Discography ==
- Pärlor och svin (2009)
- Där vi en gång var (2012)
