= Anniela =

Swedish pop singer (born 1990)

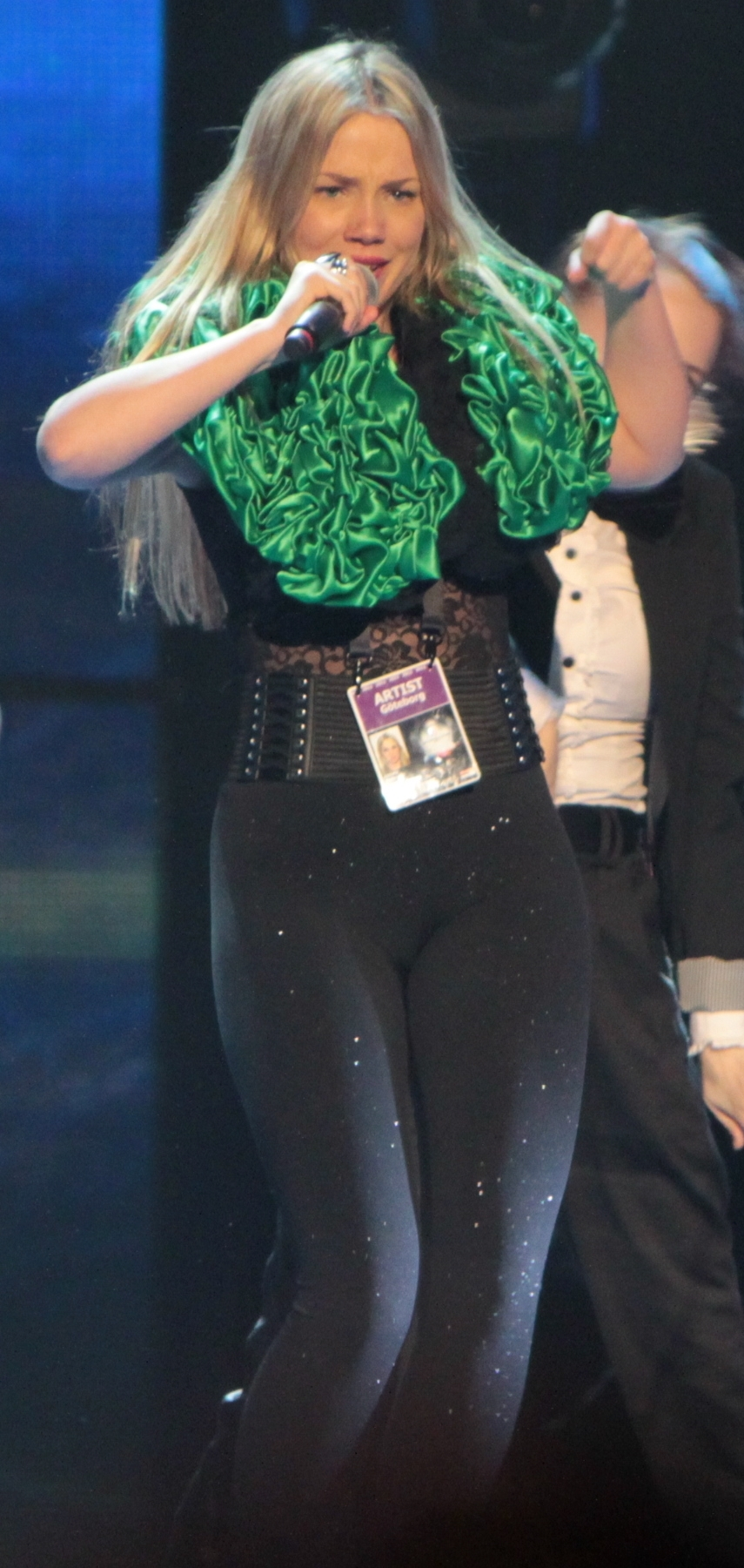

Background information
- Born: Anniela Andersson; 3 June 1990 (age 36)
- Origin: Rinkaby, Sweden
- Genres: Pop, dance, electropop, R&B
- Occupations: Singer, songwriter
- Years active: 2003–present
- Label: Hitworks
- Website: www.anniela.se

Anniela (born 3 June 1990) is a Swedish pop singer originally from Rinkaby in Skåne, but has been living in Stockholm for a few years. Signed to Hitworks, she released her début album Extravaganza in 2009. She appeared on a talent show TV4 when she was 13 years old and in various musicals. Her music can be described as international electro dance pop in English with hints of R&B and she offers avery visual performance. Annielas debut was released in a number of foreign countries. In 2011 she participated in Melodifestivalen 2011 with the song Elektrisk, with lyrics in Swedish, which is a first for her. She didn't make it to the final, getting 6th place in the second semi-final.

== Discography ==
Album

- 2009 – Extravaganza
- 2011 – Electric

Singles

- 2009 – "Strip-teaser"
- 2010 – "My Confession"
- 2011 – "Elektrisk/Electric"
- 2011 – "Sin of my Own"
- 2011 – "Party Crusher"
