= Heroes Are Calling =

Single by Smash into Pieces
- Released: 2 March 2024
- Length: 2:59
- Label: Self-released
- Songwriters: Andreas "Giri" Lindbergh; Benjamin Jennebo; Chris Adam Hedman Sörbye; Jimmy "Joker" Thörnfeldt; Joy Deb; Linnea Deb; Per Bergquist

Smash into Pieces singles chronology
"Trigger" (2024)	"Heroes Are Calling" (2024)

"Heroes Are Calling" is a song by Swedish rock band Smash into Pieces, released as a single on 2 March 2024. It was performed in Melodifestivalen 2024.

== Charts ==
=== Weekly charts ===
Weekly chart performance for "Heroes Are Calling"
Chart (2024)	Peak position
Sweden (Sverigetopplistan)	4

=== Year-end charts ===
Year-end chart performance for "Heroes Are Calling"
Chart (2024)	Position
Sweden (Sverigetopplistan)	87
