= Que Sera (Medina song) =

Single by Medina
- Released: 2 March 2024
- Length: 2:46
- Label: Warner Music Sweden
- Songwriters: Ali Jammali; Anderz Wrethov; Jimmy "Joker" Thörnfeldt; Sami Rekik

Medina singles chronology
"När krutet har lagt sig" (2023)	"Que Sera" (2024)

"Que Sera" is a song by Swedish hip hop duo Medina, released as a single on 2 March 2024. It was performed in Melodifestivalen 2024, where it was the only song with Swedish lyrics qualifying for the final. It came second in the final with 104 points.

== Charts ==
=== Weekly charts ===
Weekly chart performance for "Que Sera"
Chart (2024)	Peak position
Sweden (Sverigetopplistan)	1

=== Year-end charts ===
Year-end chart performance for "Que Sera"
Chart (2024)	Position
Sweden (Sverigetopplistan)	6
