= Awful Liar =

Single by Lisa Ajax
- Released: 2 March 2024
- Length: 3:02
- Label: Universal
- Songwriters: David Lindgren Zacharias; Sebastian Atas; Victor Crone; Victor Sjöström

Lisa Ajax singles chronology
"Falling for Christmas" (2023)	"Awful Liar" (2024)

"Awful Liar" is a song by Swedish singer Lisa Ajax, released as a single on 2 March 2024. It was performed in Melodifestivalen 2024.

== Charts ==
Chart performance for "Awful Liar"
Chart (2024)	Peak position
Sweden (Sverigetopplistan)	20
