= Dragon (song) =

Single by Liamoo
- Released: 2 March 2024
- Length: 3:00
- Label: Emperial
- Songwriters: Anderz Wrethov; Jimmy "Joker" Thörnfeldt; Julie "Kill J" Aagaard; Liam Pablito Cacatian Thomassen

Liamoo singles chronology
| "Two Christmas Hearts" (2023) | "Dragon" (2024) |

“Dragon” is a song by Swedish singer Liamoo, released as a single on 2 March 2024. It was performed in Melodifestivalen 2024. The song finished first in heat 2, qualifying directly for the final held on March 9 in 2024. They received 38 points from the juries and 45 points from the televote, finishing in 5th place with a total of 83 points.

== Charts ==
Chart performance for "Dragon"
| Chart (2024) | Peak position |
|---|---|
| Sweden (Sverigetopplistan) | 8 |
