= Chelsea Muco =

Swedish singer (born 1997)

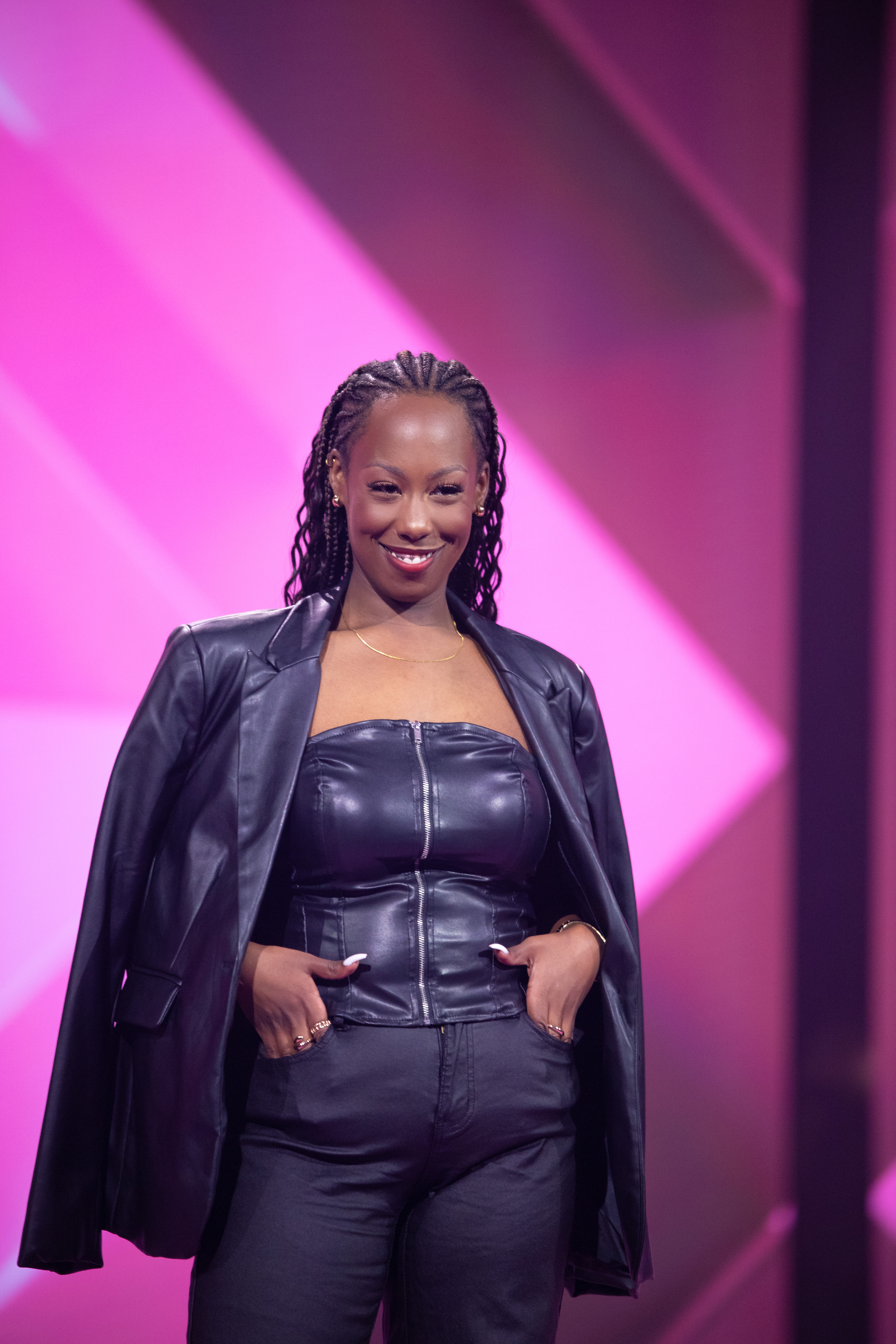
- Chelsea Muco in 2024

Background information
- Birth name: Chersea Muco
- Born: 16 April 1997 (age 28); Burundi
- Origin: Kristinehamn, Sweden
- Occupation: Singer

Chersea Muco (born 16 April 1997), known professionally as Chelsea Muco (Swedish pronunciation: [ˈtɕɛ̌lsɪ ˈmʊ̌tːɕʊ]), is a Swedish singer. She participated in Melodifestivalen 2024 with the song "Controlla", reaching fifth place in her heat and being eliminated.

== Discography ==
=== Charting singles ===
List of charting singles, with selected peak chart positions
Title	Year	Peak chart positions	Album
Title	Year	SWE	Album
"Controlla"	2024	64	Non-album single
