= Back to My Roots (Jay Smith song) =

Single by Jay Smith
- Released: 2 March 2024
- Length: 3:00
- Label: Universal
- Songwriters: Jay Smith; Jonas Jurström; Jonathan Keyes; Maria Jane Smith; Victor Thell

Jay Smith singles chronology
"The End" (2022)	"Back to My Roots" (2024)

"Back to My Roots" is a song by Swedish singer Jay Smith, released as a single on 2 March 2024. It was performed in Melodifestivalen 2024.

== Charts ==
=== Weekly charts ===
Weekly chart performance for "Back to My Roots"
Chart (2024)	Peak position
Sweden (Sverigetopplistan)	3

=== Year-end charts ===
Year-end chart performance for "Back to My Roots"
Chart (2024)	Position
Sweden (Sverigetopplistan)	72
