= It's Not Easy to Write a Love Song =

Single by Dotter
- Released: 2 March 2024
- Genre: Pop; R&B; orchestral pop
- Length: 3:01
- Label: Mookie Mama; Sony Music
- Songwriters: Dino Medanhodzic; Johanna Jansson

Dotter singles chronology
"No Room for Love" (2023)	"It's Not Easy to Write a Love Song" (2024)

"It's Not Easy to Write a Love Song" is a song by Swedish singer Dotter, released as a single on 2 March 2024. It was performed in Melodifestivalen 2024, where it finished in the 12th place.

== Charts ==
Chart performance for "It's Not Easy to Write a Love Song"
Chart (2024)	Peak position
Sweden (Sverigetopplistan)	9
