= Happy That You Found Me =

Single by Danny Saucedo
- Released: 2 March 2024
- Length: 3:00
- Label: TEN Music Group
- Songwriters: Danny Saucedo; John Martin; Kristoffer Fogelmark; Michel Zitron

Danny Saucedo singles chronology
"Har du sett henne i blått" (2023)	"Happy That You Found Me" (2024)	"Be Ok" (2024)

"Happy That You Found Me" is a song by Swedish singer Danny Saucedo, released as a single on 2 March 2024. It was performed in Melodifestivalen 2024, where it finished 6th in the final.

Peter Wilson and Sean Smith collaborated on a cover version of the song, featured on Wilson's album A Different Picture, released on September 5, 2025.

== Charts ==
Chart performance for "Happy That You Found Me"
Chart (2024)	Peak position
Sweden (Sverigetopplistan)	10
