= I Won't Shake (La La Gunilla) =

Single by Gunilla Persson
- Released: 17 February 2024
- Length: 2:59
- Label: Cardiac; Sony Music
- Songwriter: Fredrik Andersson

"I Won't Shake (La La Gunilla)" is a song by Swedish singer Gunilla Persson, released as a single on 17 February 2024. It was performed in Melodifestivalen 2024, where it made it to the final qualification round, but finished 5th, not enough to make it to the finals, and after the contest, it reached number four on the Swedish singles chart.

== Charts ==
Chart performance for "I Won't Shake (La La Gunilla)"
Chart (2024)	Peak position
Sweden (Sverigetopplistan)	4
