= Melodifestivalen 2024 =

Swedish music competition

Dates and venue
- Heat 1: 3 February 2024
- Heat 2: 10 February 2024
- Heat 3: 17 February 2024
- Heat 4: 24 February 2024
- Heat 5: 2 March 2024
- Final: 9 March 2024

Organisation
- Broadcaster: Sveriges Television (SVT)
- Artistic director: Karin Gunnarsson
- Presenters: Carina Berg

Participants
- Number of entries: 30
- Number of finalists: 12

Vote
- Voting system: Heats and final qualification: 100% public vote; Final: 50% public vote, 50% jury vote
- Winning song: "Unforgettable" by Marcus & Martinus

Melodifestivalen 2024 was the 64th edition of the Swedish music competition Melodifestivalen, which was organised by Sveriges Television (SVT) and took place over a six-week period between 3 February and 9 March 2024, hosted by Carina Berg. The winners of the competition, Marcus & Martinus with "Unforgettable", represented Sweden in the Eurovision Song Contest 2024 on home soil in Malmö, where they finished in ninth place.

== Format ==
Melodifestivalen 2024 saw six weekly shows held in six Swedish cities (namely Malmö, Gothenburg, Växjö, Eskilstuna, Karlstad and Stockholm). Carina Berg was announced as the presenter of the competition on 12 January 2023, with Björn Gustafsson later announced as her sidekick.

Changes to the format were announced on 29 June 2023. A total of 30 entries took part in the competition (two more than in previous editions) across five heats. Each heat consisted of six songs, with the top two songs directly qualifying for the final, and the third- and fourth-placing songs going to a final qualification round – replacing the semi-final, which itself had replaced the Second Chance round in 2022 – at the end of the fifth heat. The top two songs in the final qualification then progressed to the final, which comprised 12 songs. The winner of the final was determined by the usual 50/50 combination of votes from the public and an international jury. Anders Wistbacka, project manager for the event, anticipated on 12 January 2024 that several further format changes would be implemented.

Norwegian broadcaster NRK's decision to allow for the second year in a row the use of autotune in its national final, Melodi Grand Prix, prompted the European Broadcasting Union to state that such use must be limited to artistic purposes in the contest. Addressing the topic, Karin Gunnarsson, Melodifestivalen producer and artistic director, clarified that there were no plans to introduce a similar rule in the Swedish competition in the immediate future.

Competition schedule
Show	Date	City	Venue
Heat 1	3 February 2024	Malmö	Malmö Arena
Heat 2	10 February 2024	Gothenburg	Scandinavium
Heat 3	17 February 2024	Växjö	Vida Arena
Heat 4	24 February 2024	Eskilstuna	Stiga Sports Arena
Heat 5	2 March 2024	Karlstad	Löfbergs Arena
Final	9 March 2024	Stockholm	Friends Arena

== Competing entries ==
A public submission window was open between 25 August and 15 September 2023 to select the competing entries. Upon closing the submission period, SVT announced that 2,624 applications had been received, from which 15 competing entries were selected by a professional jury chaired by producer Karin Gunnarsson; the second set of 15 contestants was instead selected by a dedicated SVT board both from the received submissions and by direct invitation of artists. The selected entries were announced on 1 December 2023.

Artist	Song	Songwriter(s)
Adam Woods	"Supernatural"	Adam Christopher Allskog; Calle Hellberg; Jonna Hall; William Segerdahl
Albin Tingwall	"Done Getting Over You"	Jimmy "Joker" Thörnfeldt; Joy Deb; Linnea Deb
Annika Wickihalder	"Light"	Annika Wickihalder; Herman Gardarfve; Linnea Gawell; Patrik Jean
Cazzi Opeia	"Give My Heart a Break"	Ellen Berg; Jimmy Jansson; Moa "Cazzi Opeia" Carlebecker; Thomas G:son
Chelsea Muco	"Controlla"	Anderz Wrethov; Chelsea Muco; Elsa Carmona Oljelund; Fernand MP; Karl Flyckt; Pa Modou
C-Joe	"Ahumma"	Charles Koroma; Diana Kambugu; Michael Didriksson; Palle Hammarlund; Tony Malm; Twice Ice
Clara Klingenström	"Aldrig mer"	Bobby Ljunggren; Clara Klingenström; David Lindgren Zacharias
Danny Saucedo	"Happy That You Found Me"	Kristoffer Fogelmark; John Martin; Michel Zitron
Dear Sara	"The Silence After You"	Benjamin Rosenbohm; Jonas Thander; Marcus Winther-John; Sara Nutti
Dotter	"It's Not Easy to Write a Love Song"	Dino Medanhodžić; Johanna Jansson
Elecktra	"Banne maj"	Anderz Wrethov; Elin Wrethov; Jonny Werner; Robin Werner
Elisa Lindström	"Forever Yours"	Elisa Lindström; Erik Bernholm; Henric Axelsson; Henrik Sethsson; Thomas G:son
Engmans Kapell	"Norrland"	Larry Forsberg; Lennart Wastesson; Sven-Inge Sjöberg
Fröken Snusk	"Unga & fria"	Fröken Snusk; Sara Ryan
Gunilla Persson	"I Won't Shake (La La Gunilla)"	Fredrik Andersson
Jacqline	"Effortless"	Dino Medanhodžić; Jacqline Mossberg Mounkassa; Jimmy Jansson; Moa "Cazzi Opeia" Carlebecker; Thomas G:son
Jay Smith	"Back to My Roots"	Jay Smith; Jonas Jurström; Jonathan Keyes; Maria Jane Smith; Victor Thell
Kim Cesarion	"Take My Breath Away"	Albin Johnsén; Christoffer Johansson; Kim Cesarion; Mattias Andréasson; William Segerdahl
Klaudy	"För dig"	William Schenberg; Åke Olofsson
Lasse Stefanz	"En sång om sommaren"	Anders Wigelius; Anderz Wrethov; Robert Norberg
Lia Larsson	"30 km/h"	Axel Schylström; Jimmy Jansson; Lia Larsson; My Söderholm; Thomas G:son
Liamoo	"Dragon"	Anderz Wrethov; Jimmy "Joker" Thörnfeldt; Julie "Kill J" Aagaard; Liam Cacatian Thomassen
Lisa Ajax	"Awful Liar"	David Lindgren Zacharias; Sebastian Atas; Victor Crone; Victor Sjöström
Marcus & Martinus	"Unforgettable"	Jimmy "Joker" Thörnfeldt; Joy Deb; Linnea Deb; Marcus Gunnarsen; Martinus Gunnarsen
Maria Sur	"When I'm Gone"	Anderz Wrethov; Jimmy "Joker" Thörnfeldt; Julie "Kill J" Aagaard; Maria Sur
Medina	"Que Sera"	Ali Jammali; Anderz Wrethov; Jimmy "Joker" Thörnfeldt; Sami Rekik
Melina Borglowe	"Min melodi"	Andreas Mattsson; Melina Borglowe; Thomas G:son
Samir & Viktor	"Hela världen väntar"	David Kreuger; Fredrik Kempe; Niklas Carson Mattsson
Scarlet	"Circus X"	Emil Behmer; Henric Pierroff; Ian-Paolo Lira; Jessica Rachel Chertock; Scarlet; Simon Boustedt; Staffan Amberlind; Thirsty
Smash Into Pieces	"Heroes Are Calling"	Andreas "Giri" Lindbergh; Benjamin Jennebo; Chris Adam Hedman Sörbye; Jimmy "Joker" Thörnfeldt; Joy Deb; Linnea Deb; Per Bergquist

== Contest overview ==
=== Heat 1 ===
The first heat took place on 3 February 2024 at the Malmö Arena in Malmö. 3,281,130 viewers watched the heat live. A total of 7,337,419 votes were cast using 460,794 devices, with a total of SEK 230,707 collected for Radiohjälpen. A-Teens reunited to perform as an interval act.

R/O	Artist	Song	Round 1		Round 2				Result
R/O	Artist	Song	Votes	Place	Votes	Total	Points	Place	Result
1	Adam Woods	"Supernatural"	897,010	3	479,236	1,376,246	66	3	Final qual.
2	Samir & Viktor	"Hela världen väntar"	805,045	4	401,125	1,206,170	57	4	Out
3	Melina Borglowe	"Min melodi"	441,839	6	169,677	611,516	26	5	Out
4	Elisa Lindström	"Forever Yours"	757,042	5	342,421	1,099,463	69	2	Final qual.
5	Lisa Ajax	"Awful Liar"	1,146,470	2	610,447	1,756,917	86	1	Final
6	Smash into Pieces	"Heroes Are Calling"	1,287,107	1	—N/a				Final

Round 2 detailed televoting results
R/O	Song	Age groups							Tel.
R/O	Song	3‍–‍9	10‍–‍15	16‍–‍29	30‍–‍44	45‍–‍59	60‍–‍74	75+	Tel.
1	"Supernatural"	12	10	10	10	8	8	5	3
2	"Hela världen väntar"	10	8	8	5	5	5	8	8
3	"Min melodi"	3	3	3	3	3	3	3	5
4	"Forever Yours"	5	5	5	8	10	12	12	12
5	"Awful Liar"	8	12	12	12	12	10	10	10

=== Heat 2 ===
The second heat took place on 10 February 2024 at the Scandinavium in Gothenburg. 3,221,292 viewers watched the heat live. A total of 10,239,205 votes were cast using 589,162 devices, with a total of SEK 418,604 collected for Radiohjälpen.

R/O	Artist	Song	Round 1		Round 2				Result
R/O	Artist	Song	Votes	Place	Votes	Total	Points	Place	Result
1	Maria Sur	"When I'm Gone"	1,463,057	2	927,690	2,390,747	94	1	Final
2	Engmans Kapell	"Norrland"	679,574	6	281,283	960,857	38	5	Out
3	Dear Sara	"The Silence After You"	1,110,711	4	607,351	1,718,062	61	2	Final qual.
4	C-Joe	"Ahumma"	1,080,133	5	556,581	1,636,714	53	4	Out
5	Liamoo	"Dragon"	1,677,964	1	—N/a				Final
6	Fröken Snusk	"Unga & fria"	1,159,654	3	695,207	1,854,861	58	3	Final qual.

Round 2 detailed televoting results
R/O	Song	Age groups							Tel.
R/O	Song	3‍–‍9	10‍–‍15	16‍–‍29	30‍–‍44	45‍–‍59	60‍–‍74	75+	Tel.
1	"When I'm Gone"	12	12	10	12	12	12	12	12
2	"Norrland"	3	3	3	3	3	5	8	10
3	"The Silence After You"	5	5	5	8	10	10	10	8
4	"Ahumma"	8	8	8	5	8	8	5	3
6	"Unga & fria"	10	10	12	10	5	3	3	5

=== Heat 3 ===
The third heat took place on 17 February 2024 at the Vida Arena in Växjö. 3,189,123 viewers watched the heat live. A total of 9,037,118 votes were cast using 567,234 devices, with a total of SEK 413,375 collected for Radiohjälpen.

R/O	Artist	Song	Round 1		Round 2				Result
R/O	Artist	Song	Votes	Place	Votes	Total	Points	Place	Result
1	Jacqline	"Effortless"	1,343,304	1	—N/a				Final
2	Clara Klingenström	"Aldrig mer"	824,631	5	381,143	1,205,774	52	4	Out
3	Kim Cesarion	"Take My Breath Away"	884,738	6	429,362	1,314,100	45	5	Out
4	Klaudy	"För dig"	908,310	4	462,679	1,370,989	59	2	Final qual.
5	Gunilla Persson	"I Won't Shake (La La Gunilla)"	1,050,416	3	565,585	1,616,001	56	3	Final qual.
6	Cazzi Opeia	"Give My Heart a Break"	1,300,644	2	886,306	2,186,950	92	1	Final

Round 2 detailed televoting results
R/O	Song	Age groups							Tel.
R/O	Song	3‍–‍9	10‍–‍15	16‍–‍29	30‍–‍44	45‍–‍59	60‍–‍74	75+	Tel.
2	"Aldrig mer"	5	3	3	5	8	10	10	8
3	"Take My Breath Away"	10	8	5	8	5	3	3	3
4	"För dig"	8	5	8	10	10	8	5	5
5	"I Won't Shake (La La Gunilla)"	3	12	12	3	3	5	8	10
6	"Give My Heart a Break"	12	10	10	12	12	12	12	12

=== Heat 4 ===
The fourth heat took place on 24 February 2024 at the Stiga Sports Arena in Eskilstuna. 3,167,182 viewers watched the heat live. A total of 9,143,540 votes were cast using 555,108 devices, with a total of SEK 362,157 collected for Radiohjälpen.

R/O	Artist	Song	Round 1		Round 2				Result
R/O	Artist	Song	Votes	Place	Votes	Total	Points	Place	Result
1	Albin Tingwall	"Done Getting Over You"	1,000,678	5	509,376	1,510,054	63	2	Final qual.
2	Lia Larsson	"30 km/h"	1,049,671	3	547,654	1,597,325	49	4	Out
3	Dotter	"It's Not Easy to Write a Love Song"	1,258,479	2	677,671	1,936,150	84	1	Final
4	Scarlet	"Circus X"	1,014,301	4	559,235	1,573,536	60	3	Final qual.
5	Lasse Stefanz	"En sång om sommaren"	789,340	6	334,002	1,123,342	48	5	Out
6	Danny Saucedo	"Happy That You Found Me"	1,403,133	1	—N/a				Final

Round 2 detailed televoting results
R/O	Song	Age groups							Tel.
R/O	Song	3‍–‍9	10‍–‍15	16‍–‍29	30‍–‍44	45‍–‍59	60‍–‍74	75+	Tel.
1	"Done Getting Over You"	5	8	10	5	8	10	12	5
2	"30 km/h"	12	10	3	8	5	3	5	3
3	"It's Not Easy to Write a Love Song"	8	12	12	10	12	12	10	8
4	"Circus X"	10	5	5	12	10	5	3	10
5	"En sång om sommaren"	3	3	8	3	3	8	8	12

=== Heat 5 ===
The fifth heat took place on 2 March 2024 at the Löfbergs Arena in Karlstad. 3,061,813 viewers watched the heat live. A total of 10,285,078 votes were cast using 597,243 devices, with a total of SEK 444,159 collected for Radiohjälpen. A medley of past Melodifestivalen entries composed by Fredrik Kempe was performed as an interval act.

R/O	Artist	Song	Round 1		Round 2				Result
R/O	Artist	Song	Votes	Place	Votes	Total	Points	Place	Result
1	Marcus & Martinus	"Unforgettable"	1,759,673	1	—N/a				Final
2	Chelsea Muco	"Controlla"	1,009,857	5	459,399	1,469,256	42	4	Out
3	Jay Smith	"Back to My Roots"	1,171,788	3	624,639	1,796,427	73	3	Final qual.
4	Elecktra	"Banne maj"	803,892	6	399,506	1,203,398	28	5	Out
5	Annika Wickihalder	"Light"	1,144,413	4	665,667	1,810,080	79	2	Final qual.
6	Medina	"Que Sera"	1,392,450	2	853,794	2,246,244	82	1	Final

Round 2 detailed televoting results
R/O	Song	Age groups							Tel.
R/O	Song	3‍–‍9	10‍–‍15	16‍–‍29	30‍–‍44	45‍–‍59	60‍–‍74	75+	Tel.
2	"Controlla"	8	8	3	5	5	5	5	3
3	"Back to My Roots"	10	5	8	10	12	10	8	10
4	"Banne maj"	3	3	5	3	3	3	3	5
5	"Light"	5	10	10	8	10	12	12	12
6	"Que Sera"	12	12	12	12	8	8	10	8

==== Final qualification ====
At the end of the fifth heat, a final qualification round took place consisting of the third- and fourth-placing songs of each heat. The two most voted songs qualified for the final; the age group system was not used for this vote, but the results from the heats were added to it to determine the result of the final qualification. More specifically, for the heat points, the total number of votes for each song in each show was divided by the total number of voters (devices) in each show. Then 1000 points were distributed amongst the songs based on those ratios. Once the voting had ended, an additional 1000 points were distributed among the entries, based on how viewers had voted during the final qualification round. A total of 6,551,057 votes were cast using 518,179 devices, with a total of SEK 517,392 collected for Radiohjälpen.

Code	Artist	Song	Heat			Final qual.		Total	Place	Result
Code	Artist	Song	Votes	V/V	Points	Votes	Points	Total	Place	Result
11	Elisa Lindström	"Forever Yours"	1,099,463	2.39	84	381,269	58	142	10	Out
12	Adam Woods	"Supernatural"	1,376,246	2.99	106	545,665	83	189	6	Out
13	Dear Sara	"The Silence After You"	1,718,062	2.92	103	435,793	66	169	8	Out
14	Fröken Snusk	"Unga & fria"	1,854,861	3.15	111	809,748	124	235	3	Out (Note: In case of a tie, the exact number of votes cast during the final qualification round were taken into account to break the tie.)
15	Klaudy	"För dig"	1,370,989	2.42	86	508,044	78	164	9	Out
16	Gunilla Persson	"I Won't Shake (La La Gunilla)"	1,616,001	2.85	101	741,004	113	214	5	Out
17	Albin Tingwall	"Done Getting Over You"	1,510,054	2.72	96	581,259	89	185	7	Out
18	Scarlet	"Circus X"	1,573,536	2.84	100	796,229	122	222	4	Out
19	Annika Wickihalder	"Light"	1,810,080	3.03	107	906,864	138	245	1	Final
20	Jay Smith	"Back to My Roots"	1,796,427	3.01	106	845,182	129	235	2	Final

=== Final ===
The final took place on 9 March 2024 at the Friends Arena in Stockholm. 3,411,627 viewers watched the show live. A total of 26,597,637 votes were cast using 1,028,307 devices, with a total of SEK 1,949,008 collected for Radiohjälpen. The live stream of the show on SVT Play was available with English commentary by William Lee Adams and Bella Qvist.

R/O	Artist	Song	Juries	Public	Total	Place
1	Maria Sur	"When I'm Gone"	37	35	72	7
2	Jay Smith	"Back to My Roots"	20	26	46	10
3	Lisa Ajax	"Awful Liar"	26	11	37	11
4	Smash into Pieces	"Heroes Are Calling"	31	59	90	3
5	Cazzi Opeia	"Give My Heart a Break"	46	41	87	4
6	Annika Wickihalder	"Light"	38	25	63	8
7	Marcus & Martinus	"Unforgettable"	85	92	177	1
8	Dotter	"It's Not Easy to Write a Love Song"	26	8	34	12
9	Medina	"Que Sera"	43	61	104	2
10	Liamoo	"Dragon"	38	45	83	5
11	Jacqline	"Effortless"	40	21	61	9
12	Danny Saucedo	"Happy That You Found Me"	34	40	74	6

Detailed international jury votes
R/O	Song	Belgium	Ireland	Malta	Serbia	Australia	Iceland	Germany	Cyprus	Total
R/O	Song	Belgium	Ireland	Malta	Serbia	Australia	Iceland	Germany	Cyprus	Total
1	"When I'm Gone"	4	1	4	8	10		7	3	37
2	"Back to My Roots"	5	8		4		1	1	1	20
3	"Awful Liar"	2			6	3	4	3	8	26
4	"Heroes Are Calling"	6	7	5	2	1		5	5	31
5	"Give My Heart a Break"	12	3	6	7	7	7		4	46
6	"Light"		4	10	10		6	8		38
7	"Unforgettable"	8	5	12	12	12	12	12	12	85
8	"It's Not Easy to Write a Love Song"	3	2	2		8	3	6	2	26
9	"Que Sera"	10	12	8	5	4	2	2		43
10	"Dragon"	1	6	7	3	2	5	4	10	38
11	"Effortless"	7		1		6	10	10	6	40
12	"Happy That You Found Me"		10	3	1	5	8		7	34
International jury spokespersons
Belgium – Birgit Simal; Ireland – Neil Doherty; Malta – Gordon Bonello; Serbia – Ivan Simonović; Australia – Danny Estrin; Iceland – Felix Bergsson; Germany – Alina Stiegler; Cyprus – Evi Papamichael

Detailed televoting results
R/O	Song	Votes	Age groups							Tel.	Total
R/O	Song	Votes	3‍–‍9	10‍–‍15	16‍–‍29	30‍–‍44	45‍–‍59	60‍–‍74	75+	Tel.	Total
1	"When I'm Gone"	2,239,255	6	8	7	4	1		8	1	35
2	"Back to My Roots"	1,997,809	3		6	5	3	4		5	26
3	"Awful Liar"	1,754,949	4	5	2						11
4	"Heroes Are Calling"	2,688,509	10	6	5	12	10	6	2	8	59
5	"Give My Heart a Break"	2,042,843	5	2		7	6	10	5	6	41
6	"Light"	1,852,595		1	4	1	2	7	6	4	25
7	"Unforgettable"	3,186,801	12	12	12	8	12	12	12	12	92
8	"It's Not Easy to Write a Love Song"	1,633,089	2	4				1	1		8
9	"Que Sera"	2,894,693	8	10	10	10	7	2	7	7	61
10	"Dragon"	2,486,029	7	7	8	6	5	5	4	3	45
11	"Effortless"	1,930,548		3	3	3	4	3	3	2	21
12	"Happy That You Found Me"	1,890,517	1		1	2	8	8	10	10	40

== Ratings ==
Viewing figures by show
Show	Air date	Viewers			Ref.
Show	Air date	TV (millions)	TV share (%)	Online	Ref.
Heat 1	3 February 2024	2.771	76.7	381,130	
Heat 2	10 February 2024	2.838	80.4	363,292	
Heat 3	17 February 2024	2.751	73.8	434,123	
Heat 4	24 February 2024	2.753	79.4	402,182	
Heat 5	2 March 2024	2.627	76.1	408,813	
Final	9 March 2024	2.841	72.2	560,627	

== Gallery ==
=== Heat 1 ===
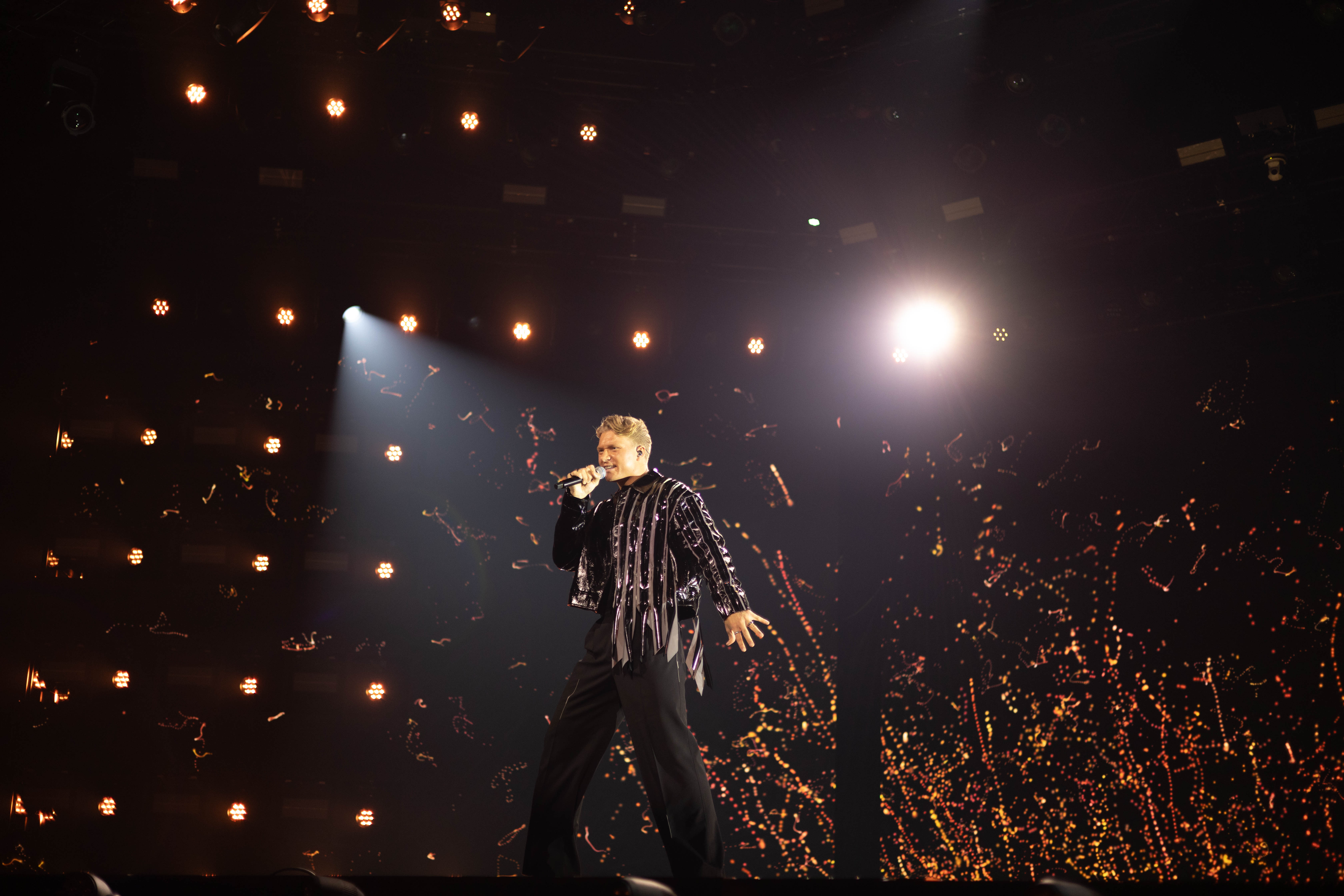
Adam Woods – "Supernatural"

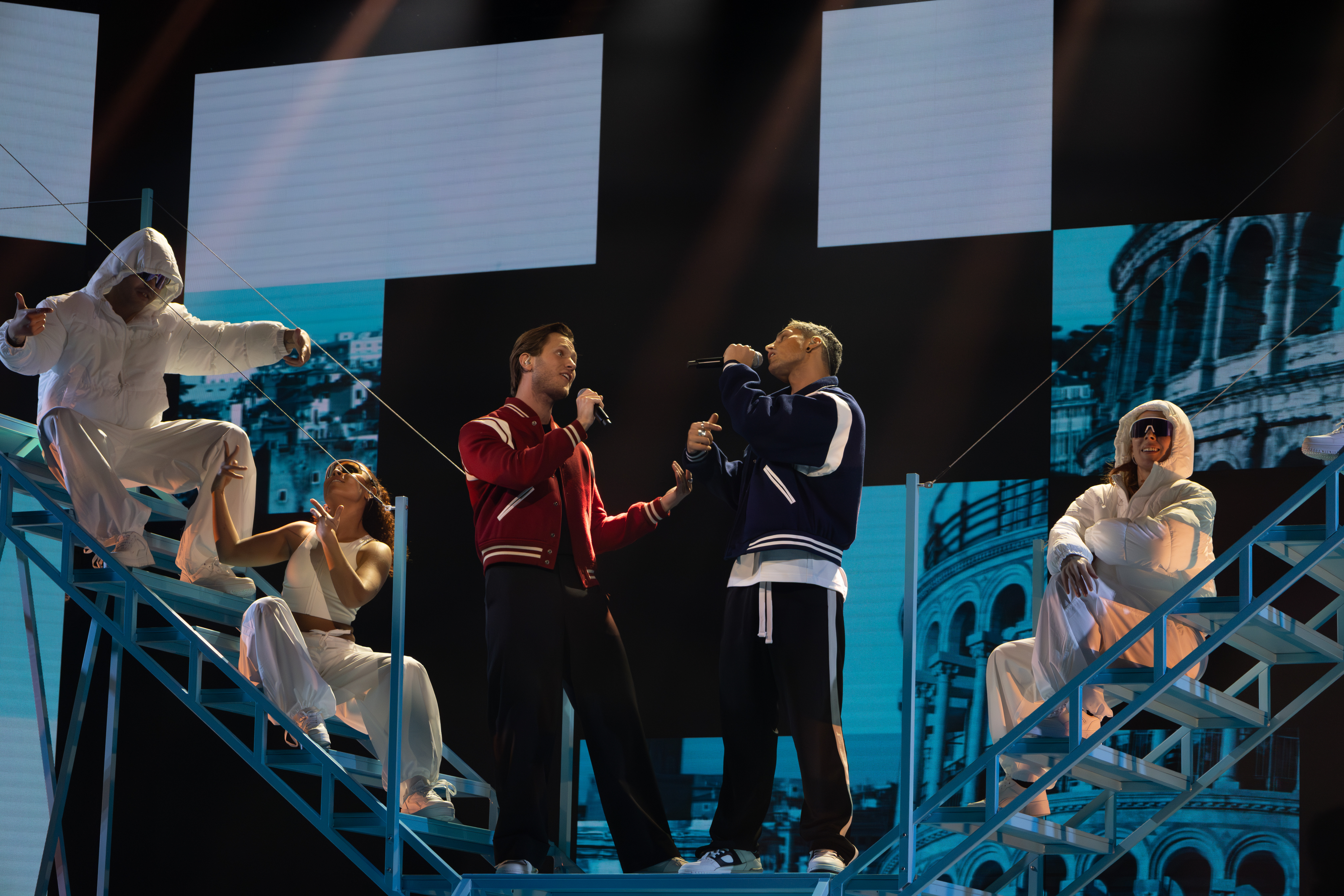
Samir & Viktor – "Hela världen väntar"

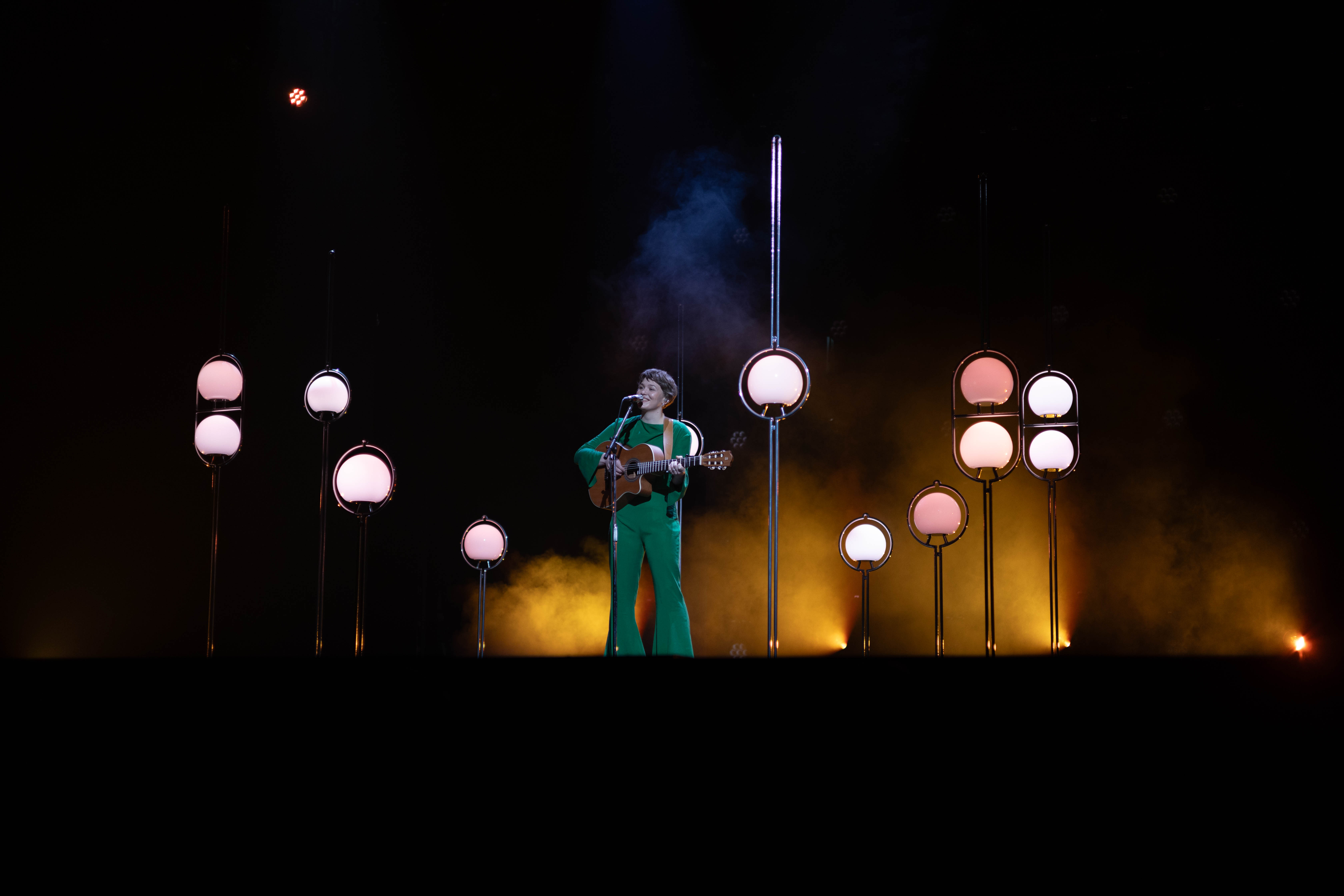
Melina Borglowe – "Min melodi"

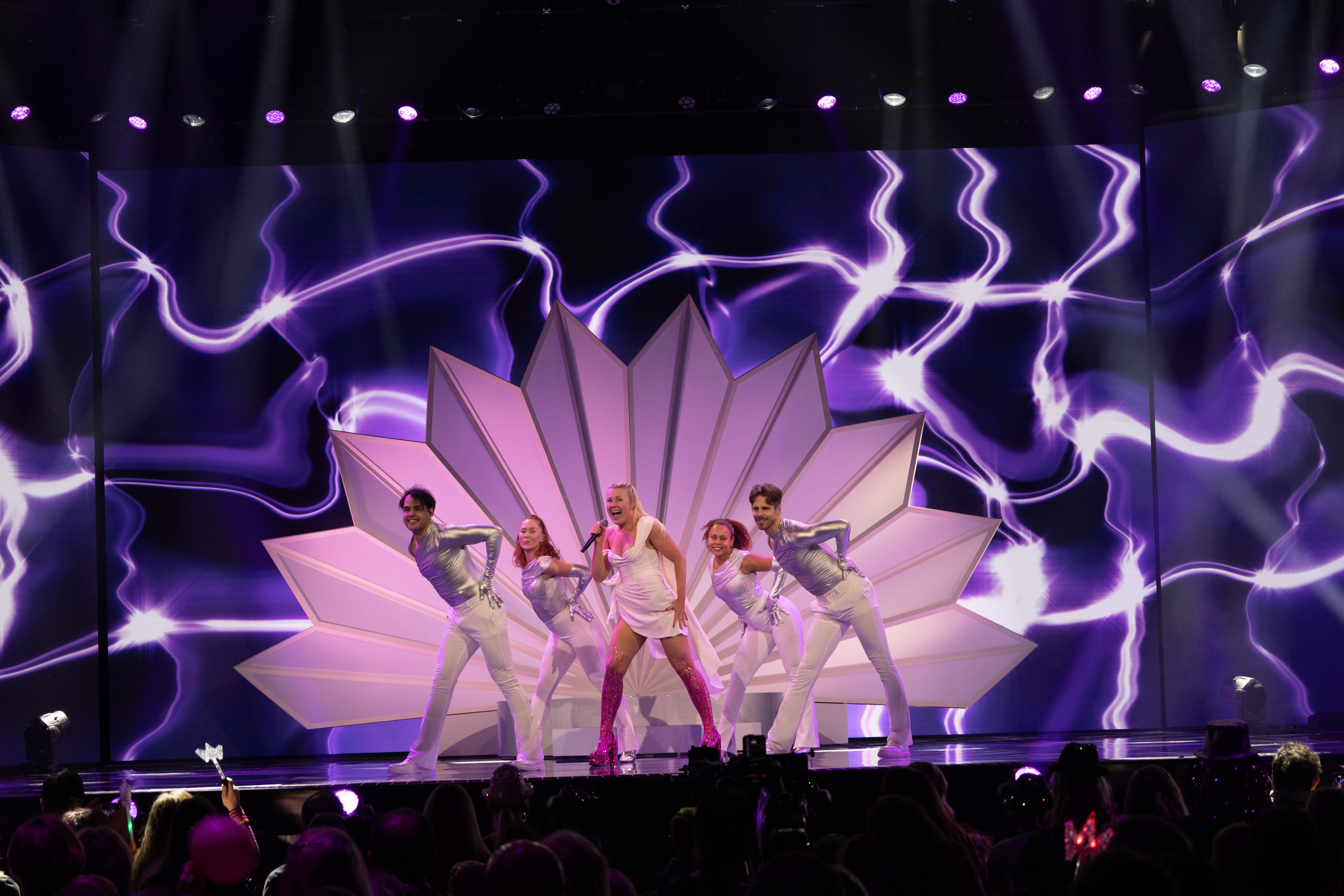
Elisa Lindström – "Forever Yours"

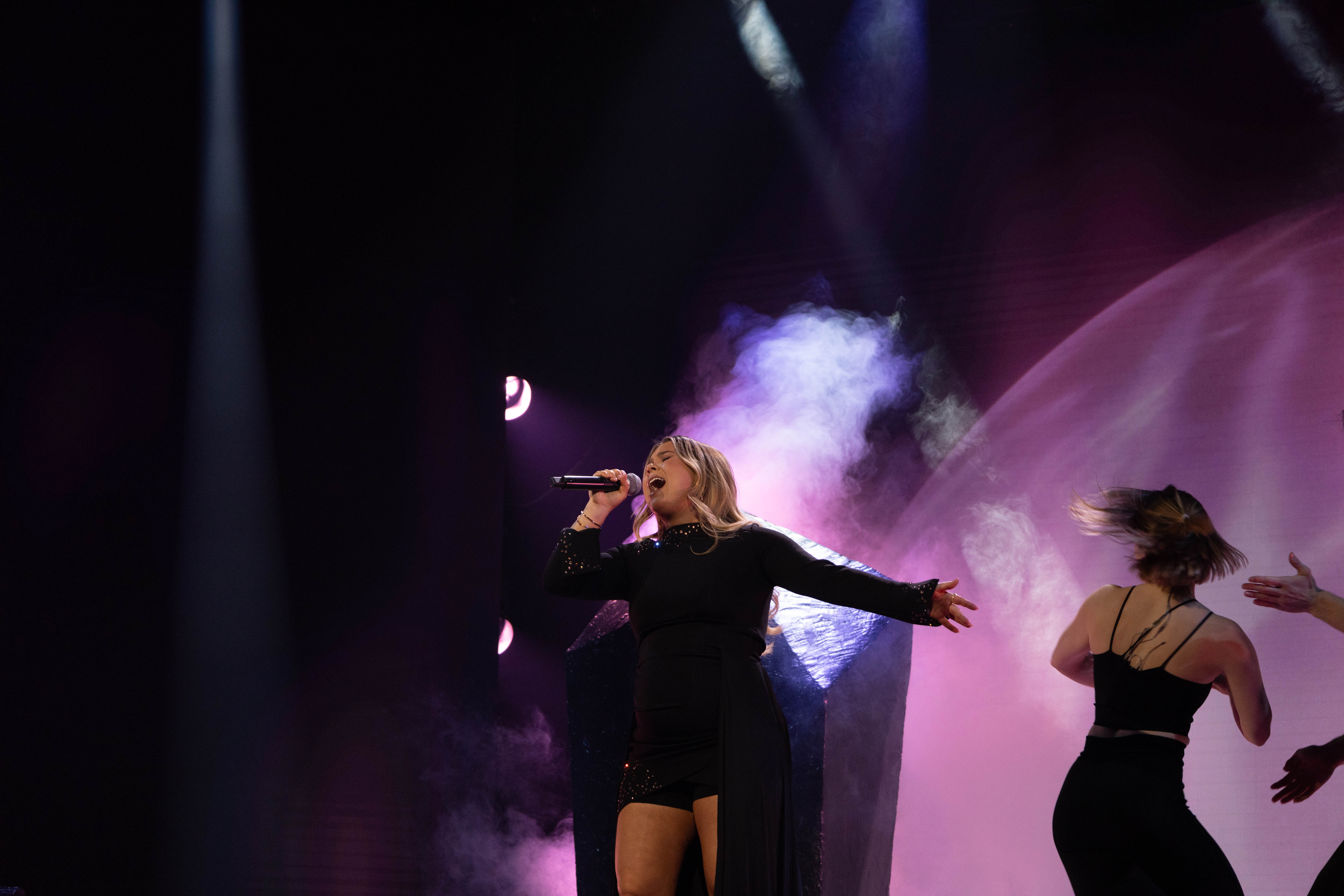
Lisa Ajax – "Awful Liar"

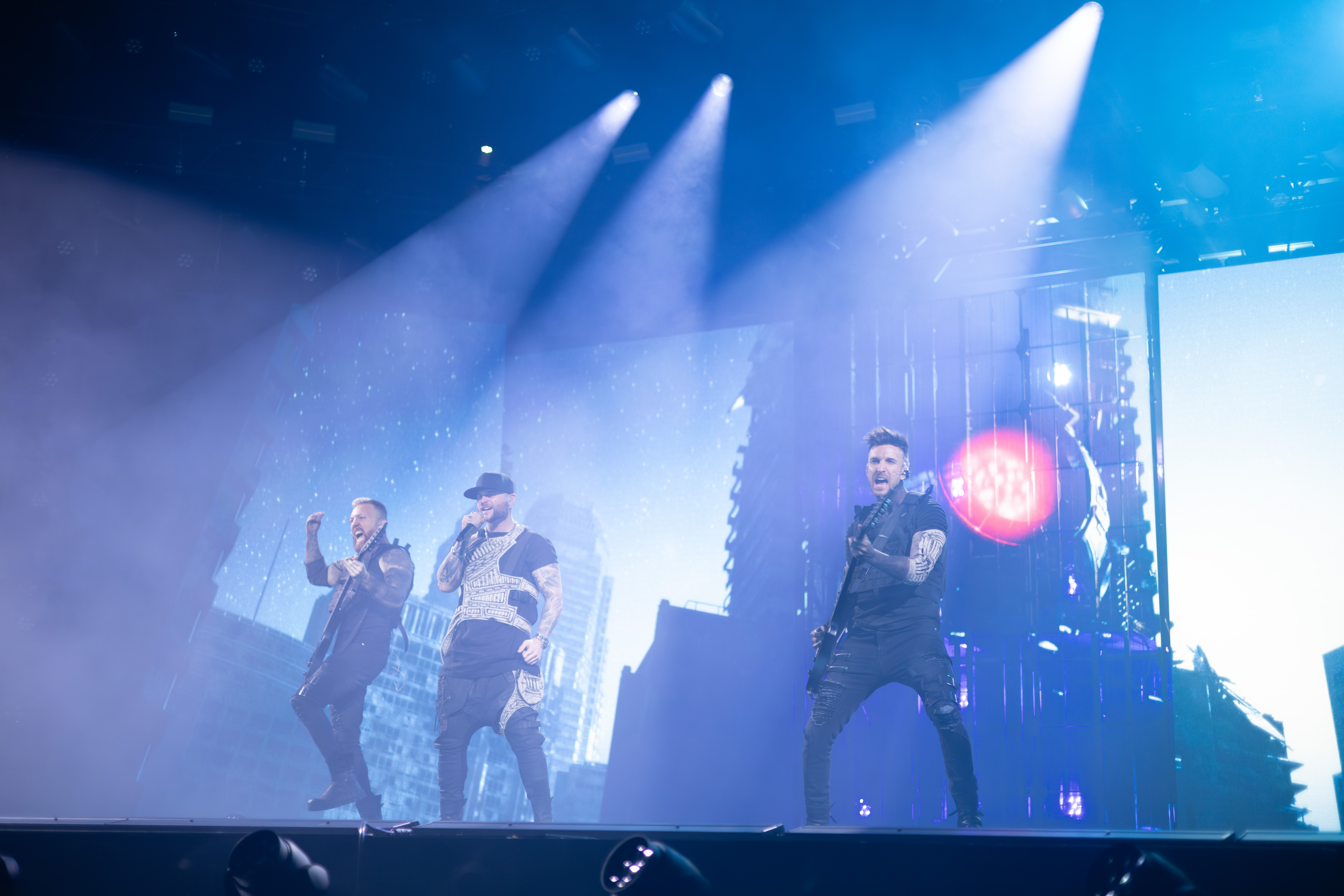
Smash Into Pieces – "Heroes Are Calling"

=== Heat 2 ===
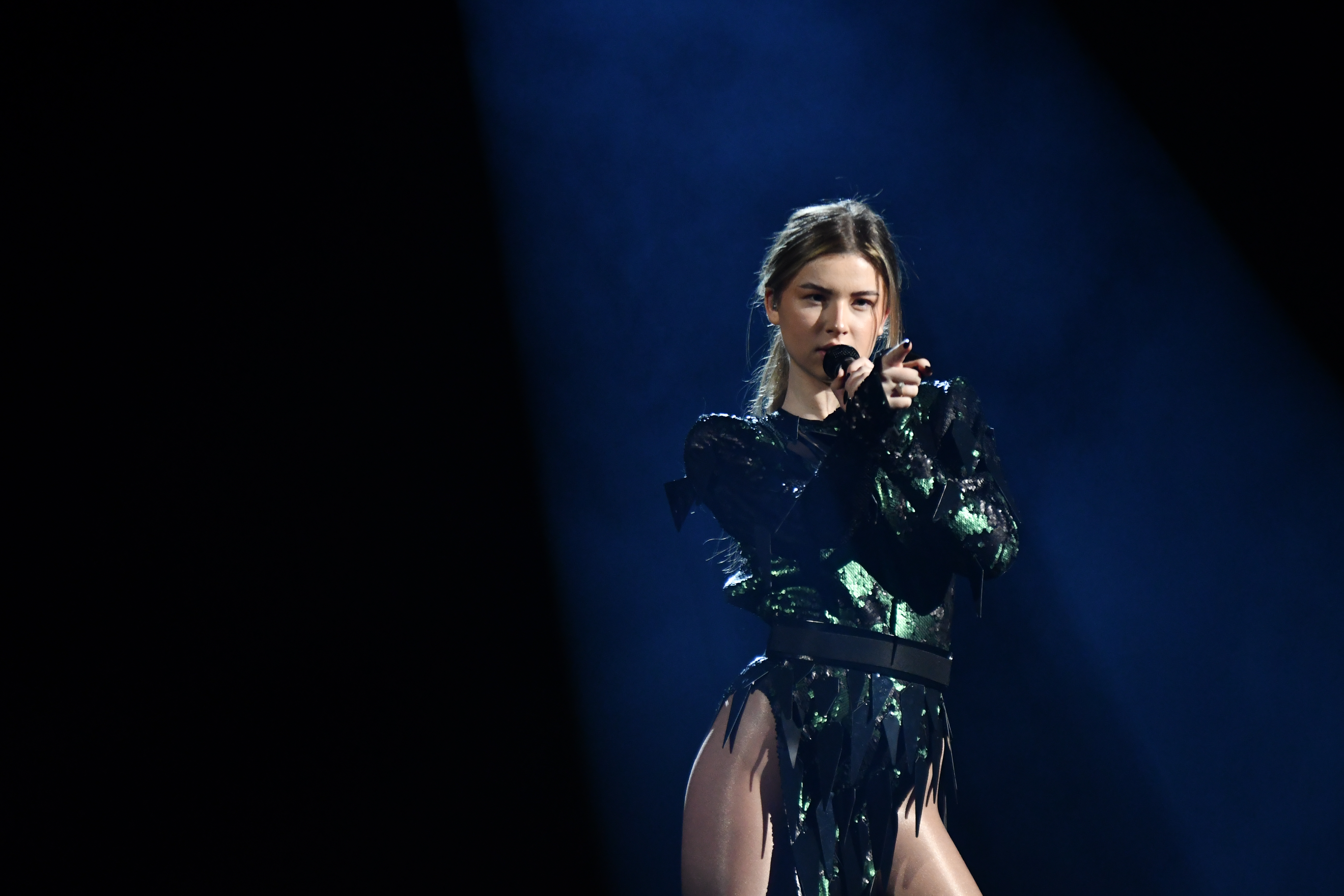
Maria Sur – "When I'm Gone"

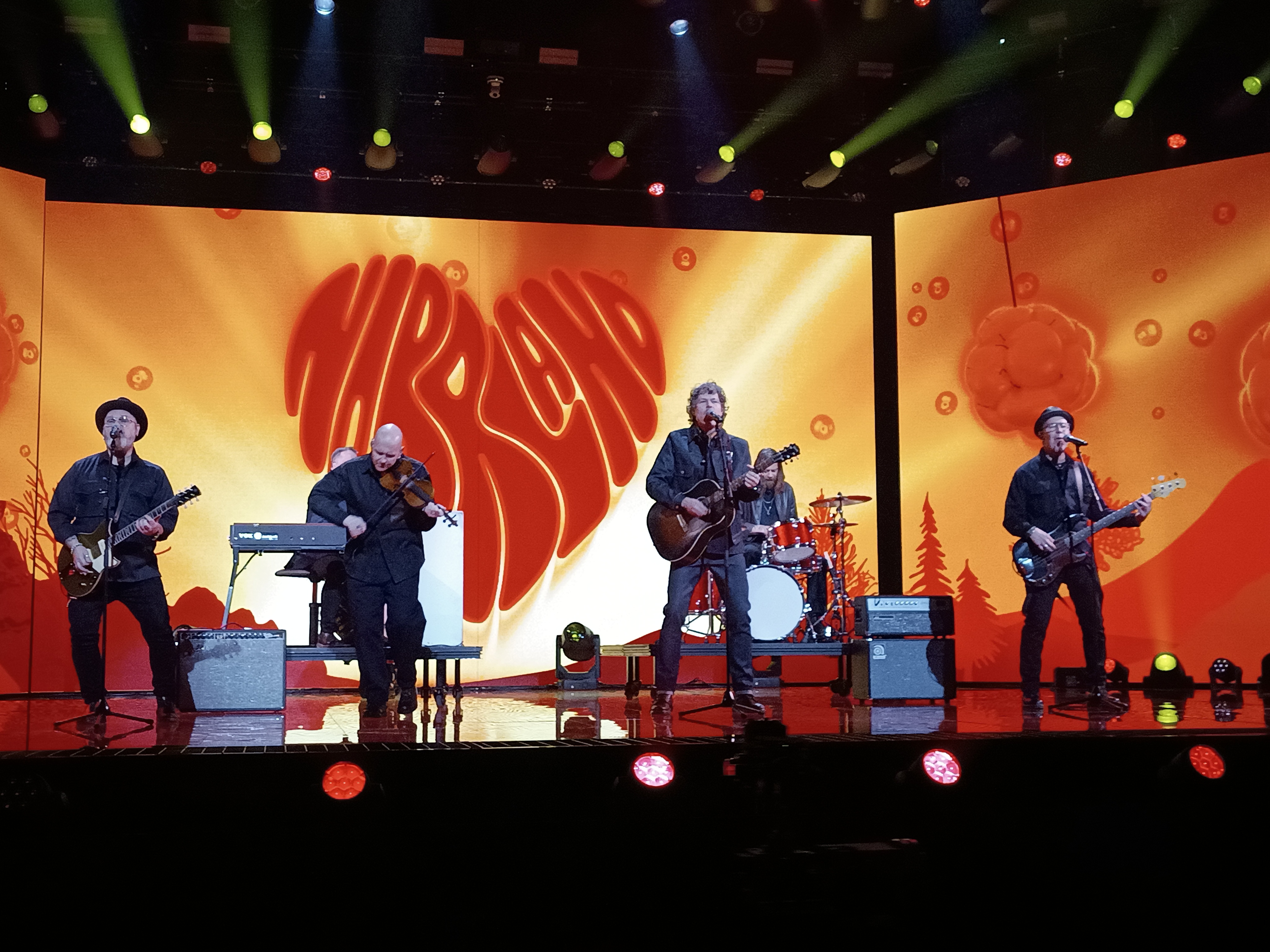
Engmans Kapell – "Norrland"

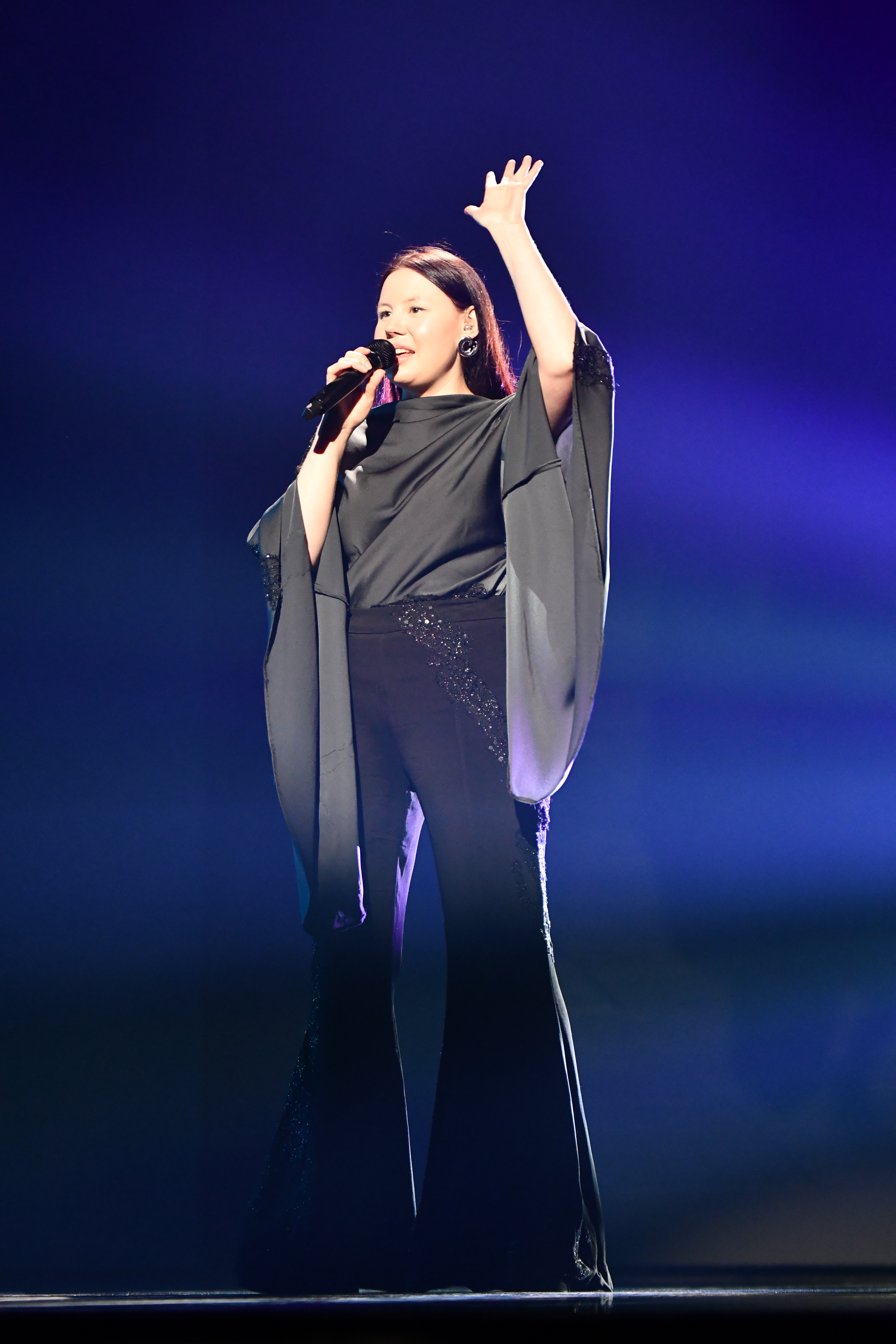
Dear Sara – "The Silence After You"

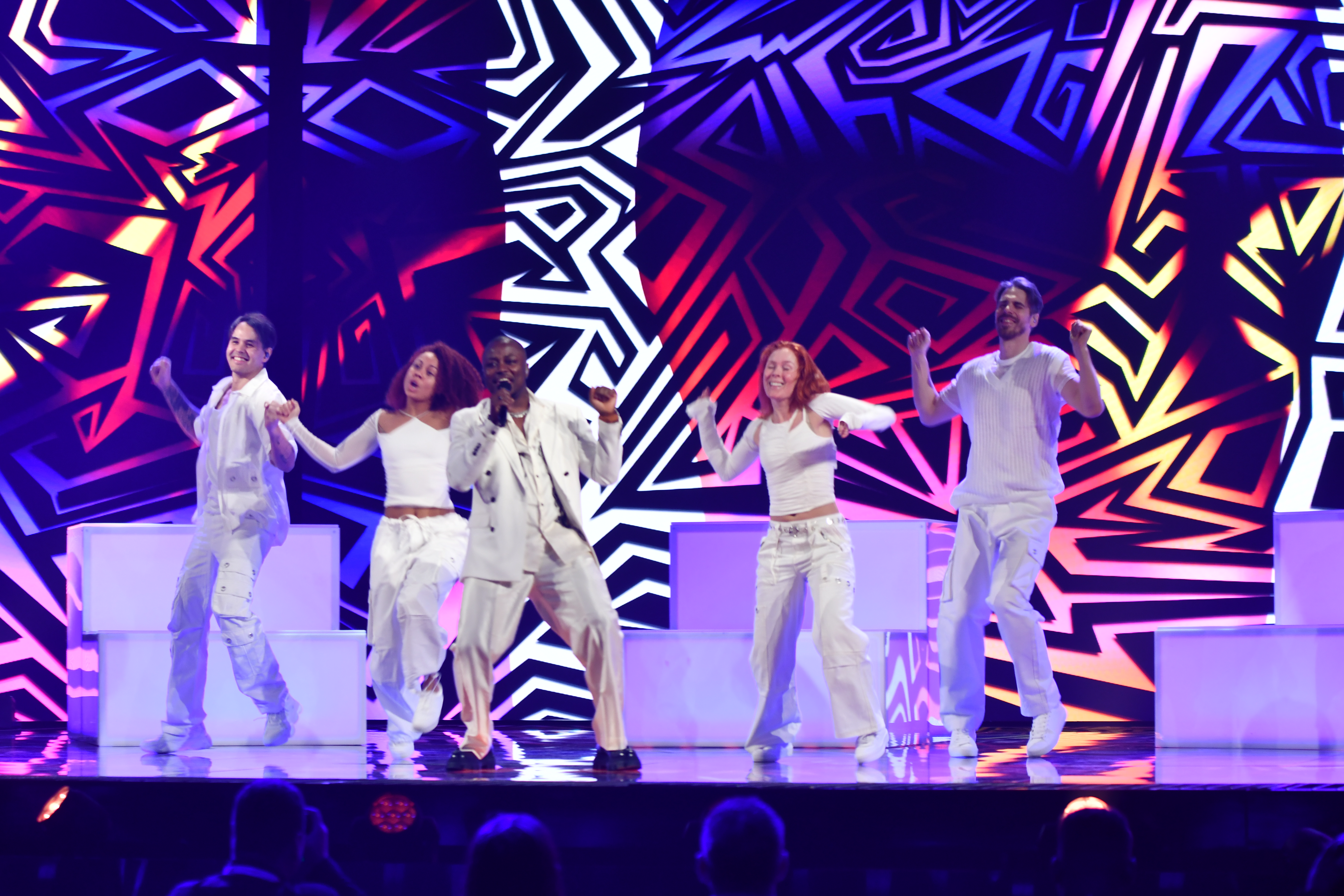
C-Joe – "Ahumma"

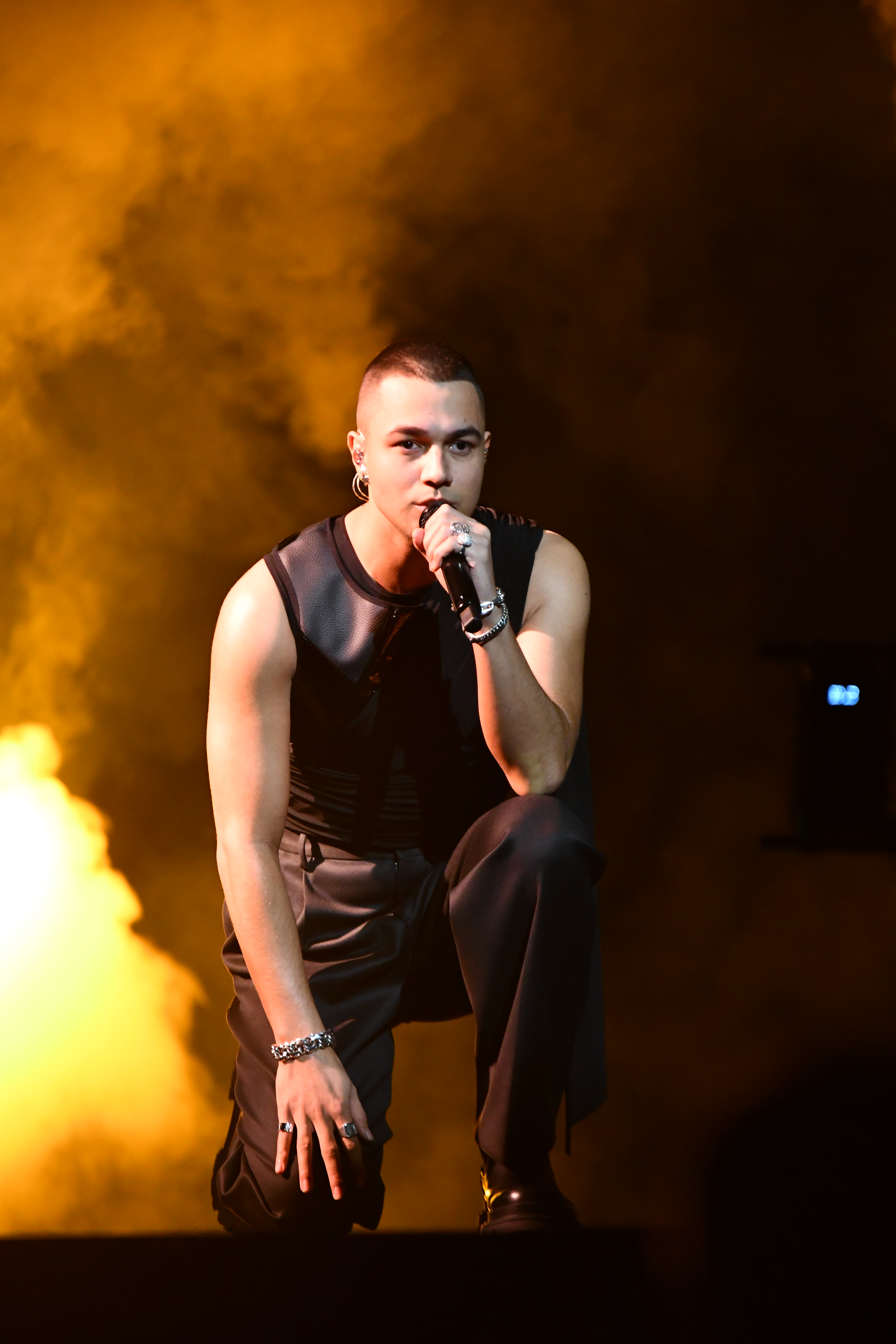
Liamoo – "Dragon"

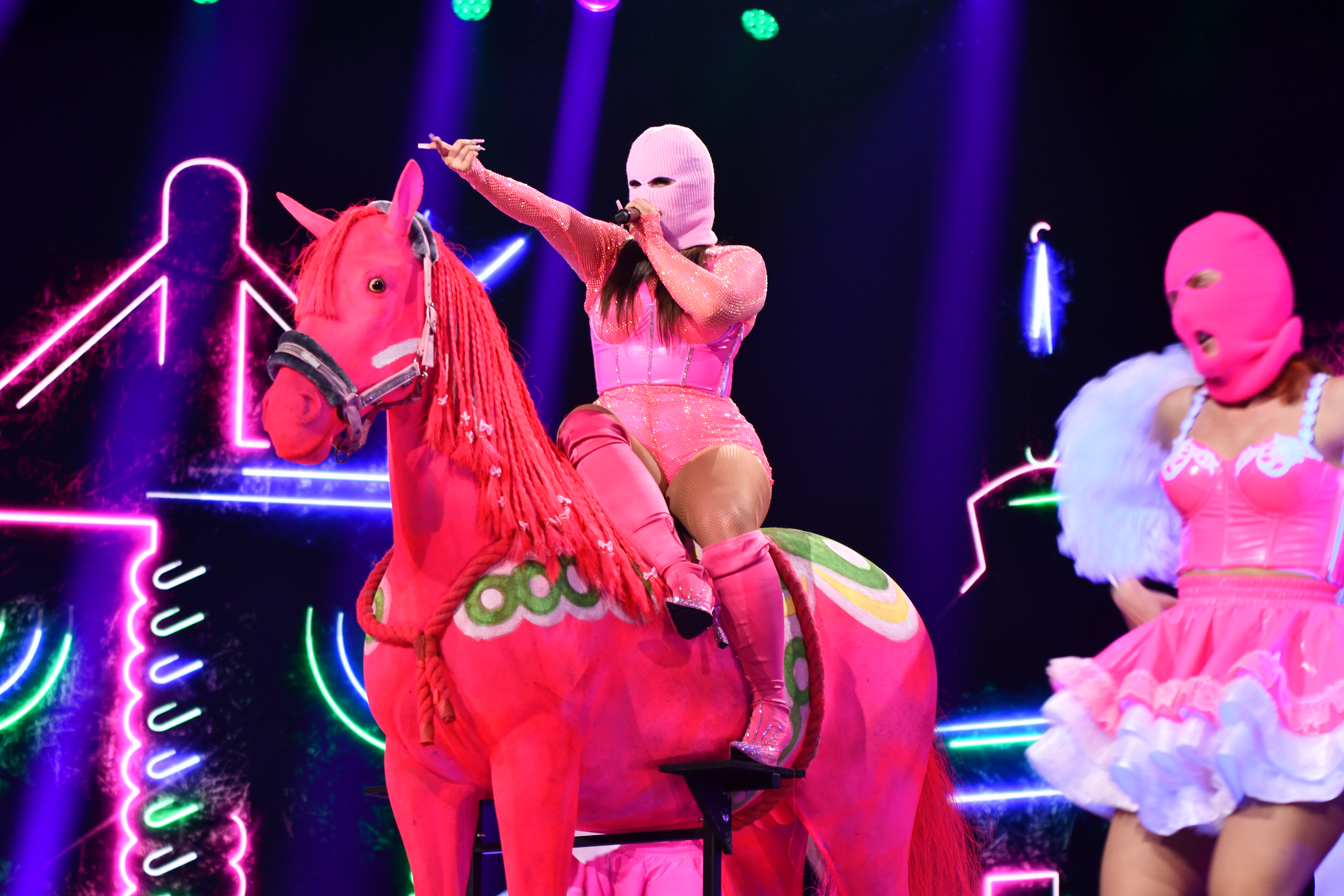
Fröken Snusk – "Unga & fria"

=== Heat 3 ===
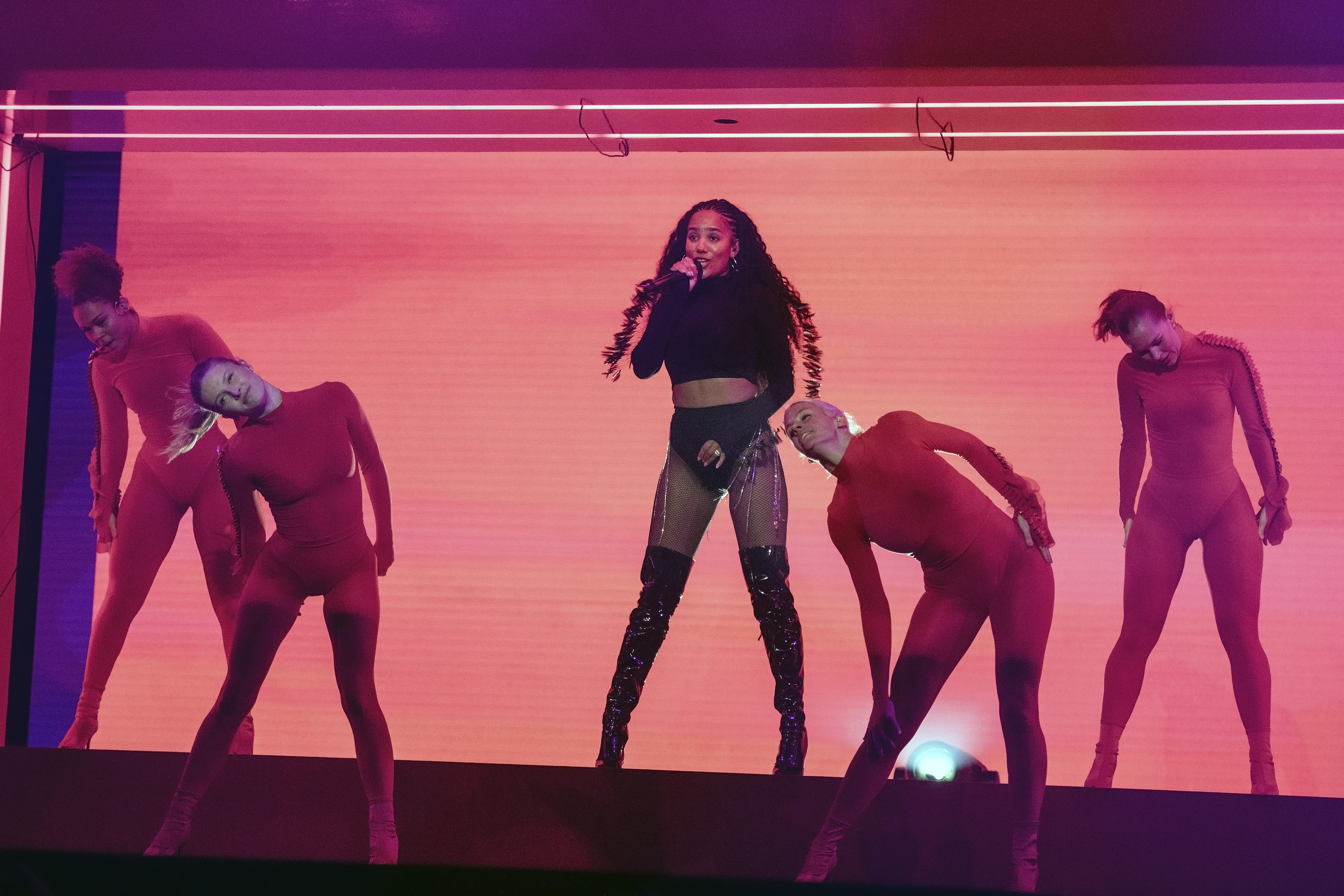
Jacqline – "Effortless"

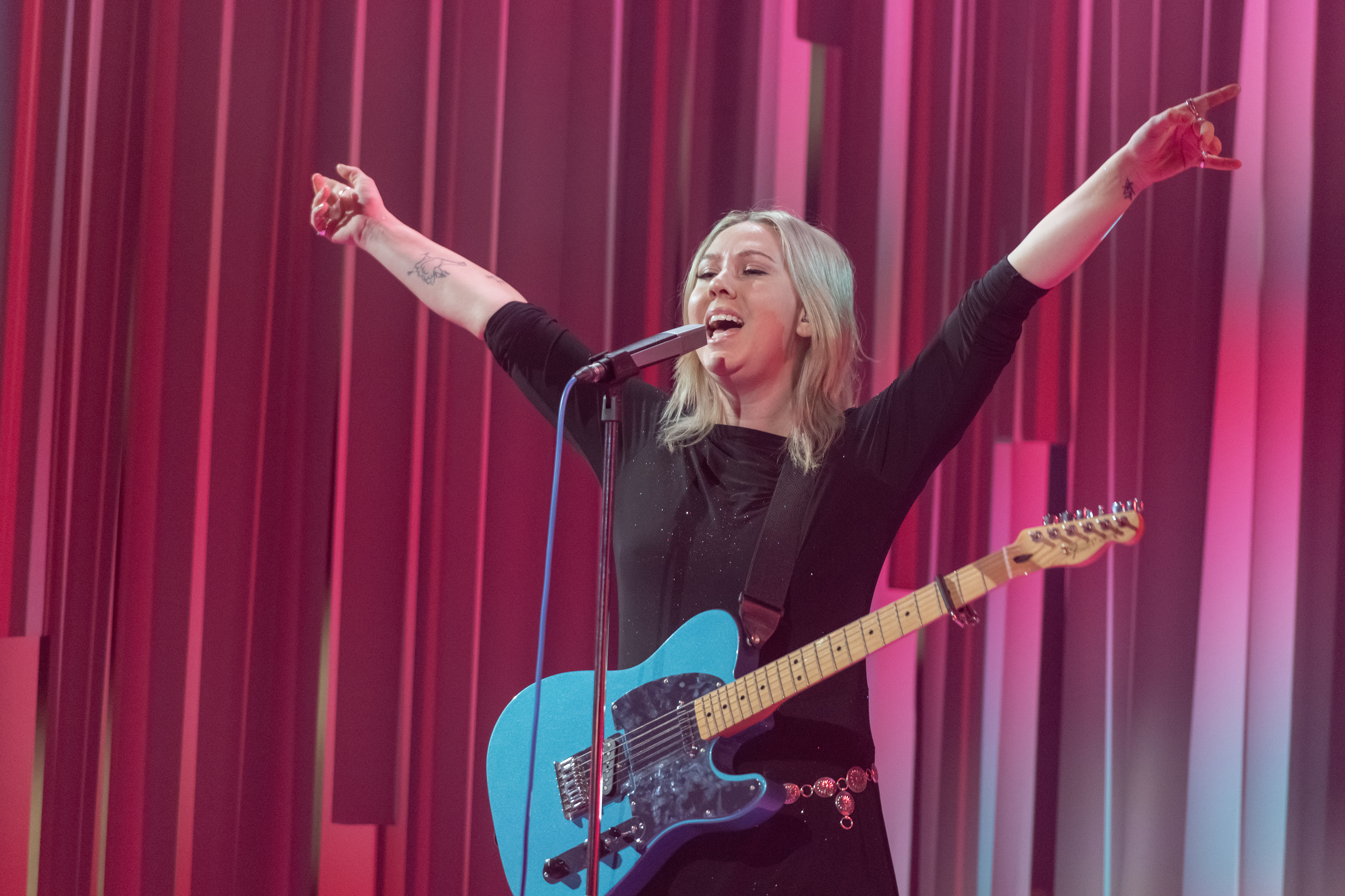
Clara Klingenström – "Aldrig mer"

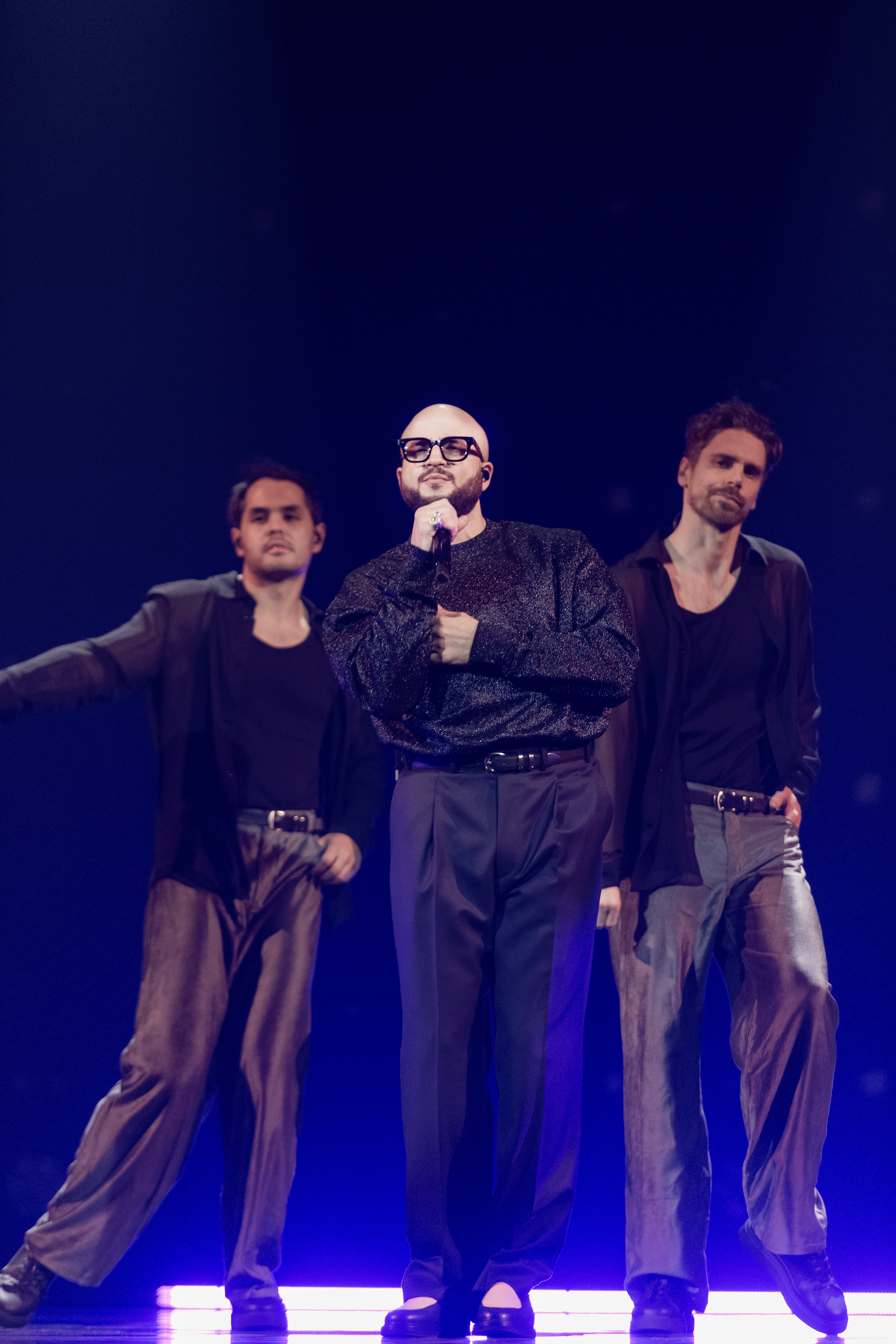
Kim Cesarion – "Take My Breath Away"

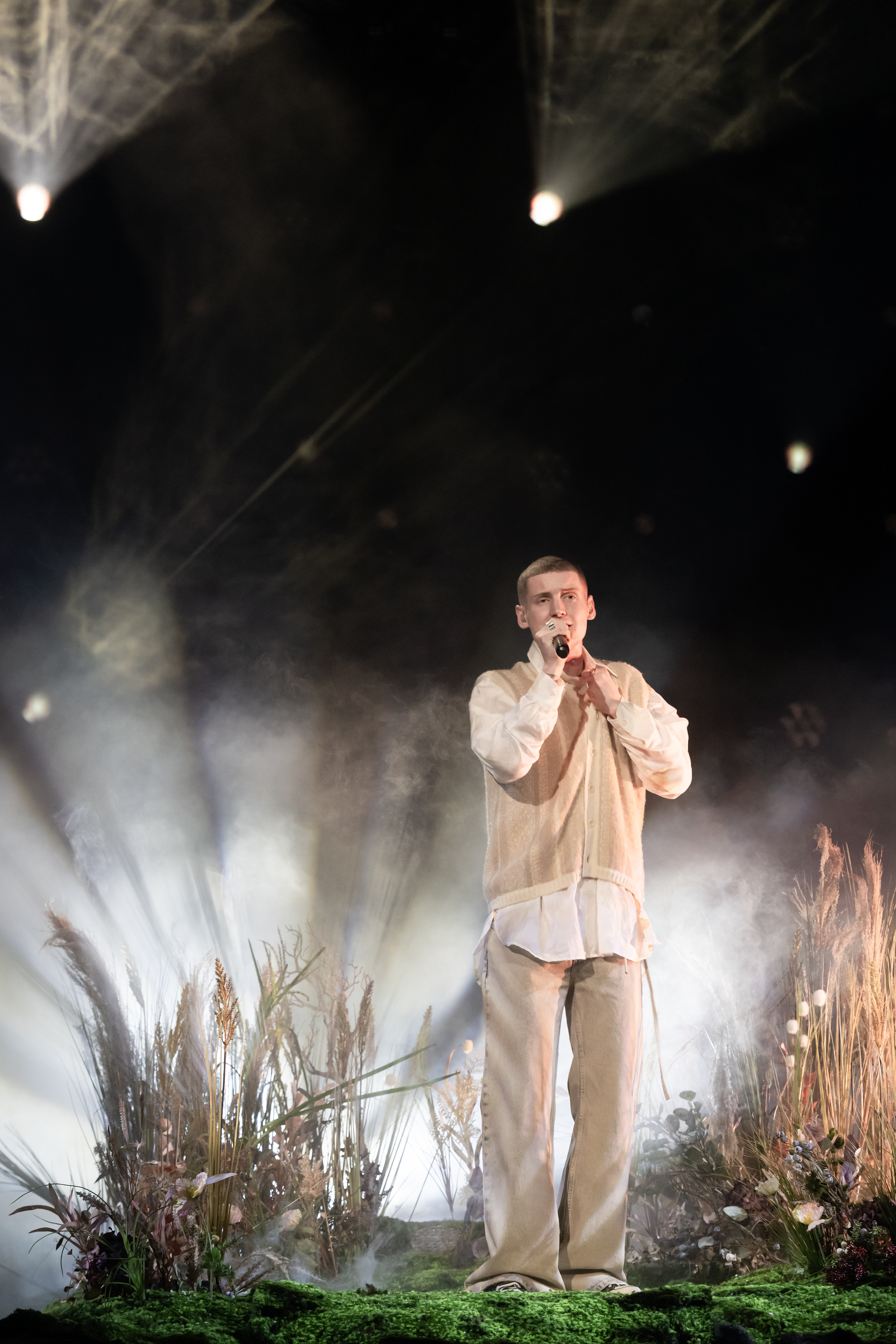
Klaudy – "För dig"

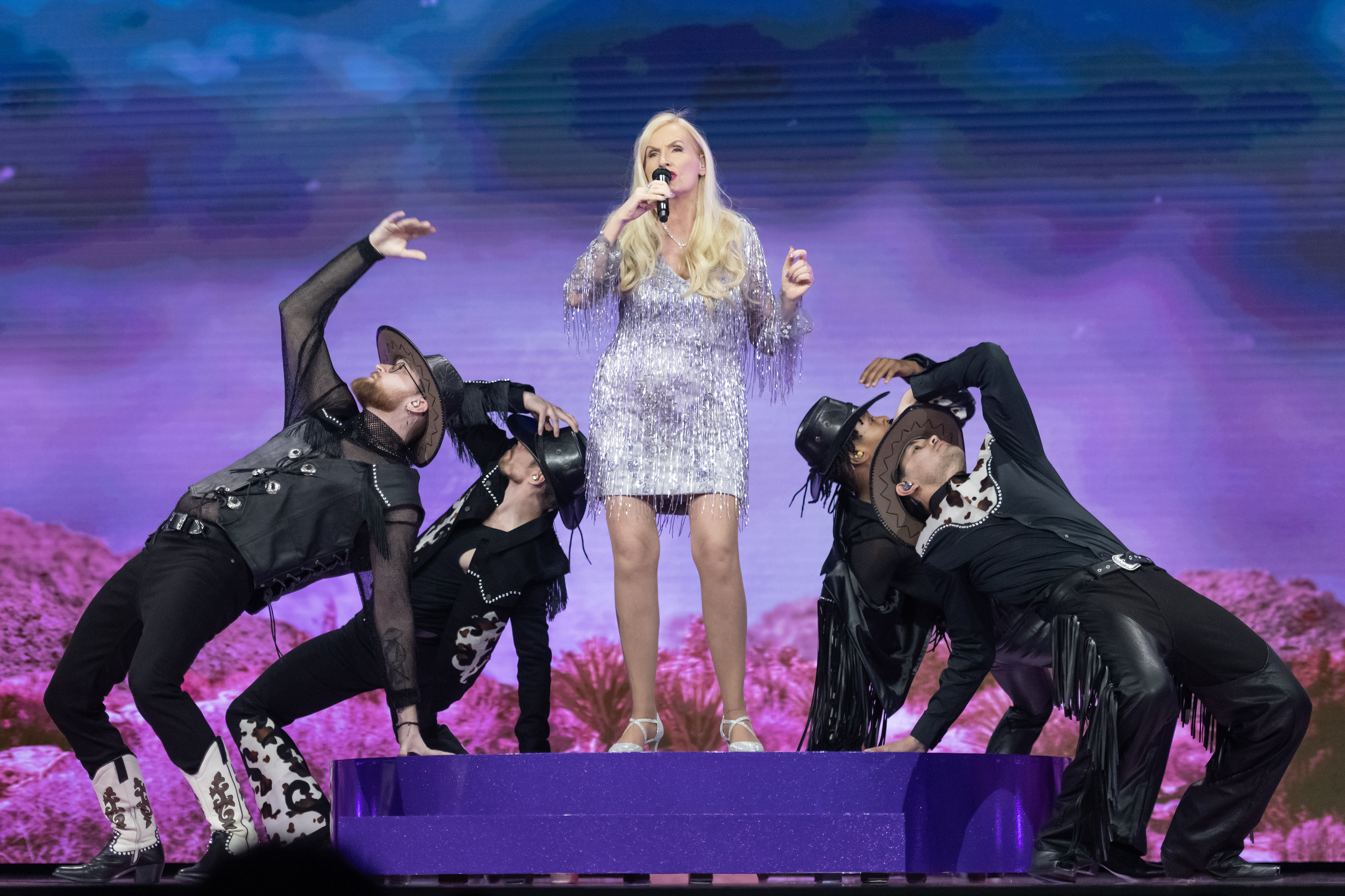
Gunilla Persson – "I Won't Shake (La La Gunilla)"

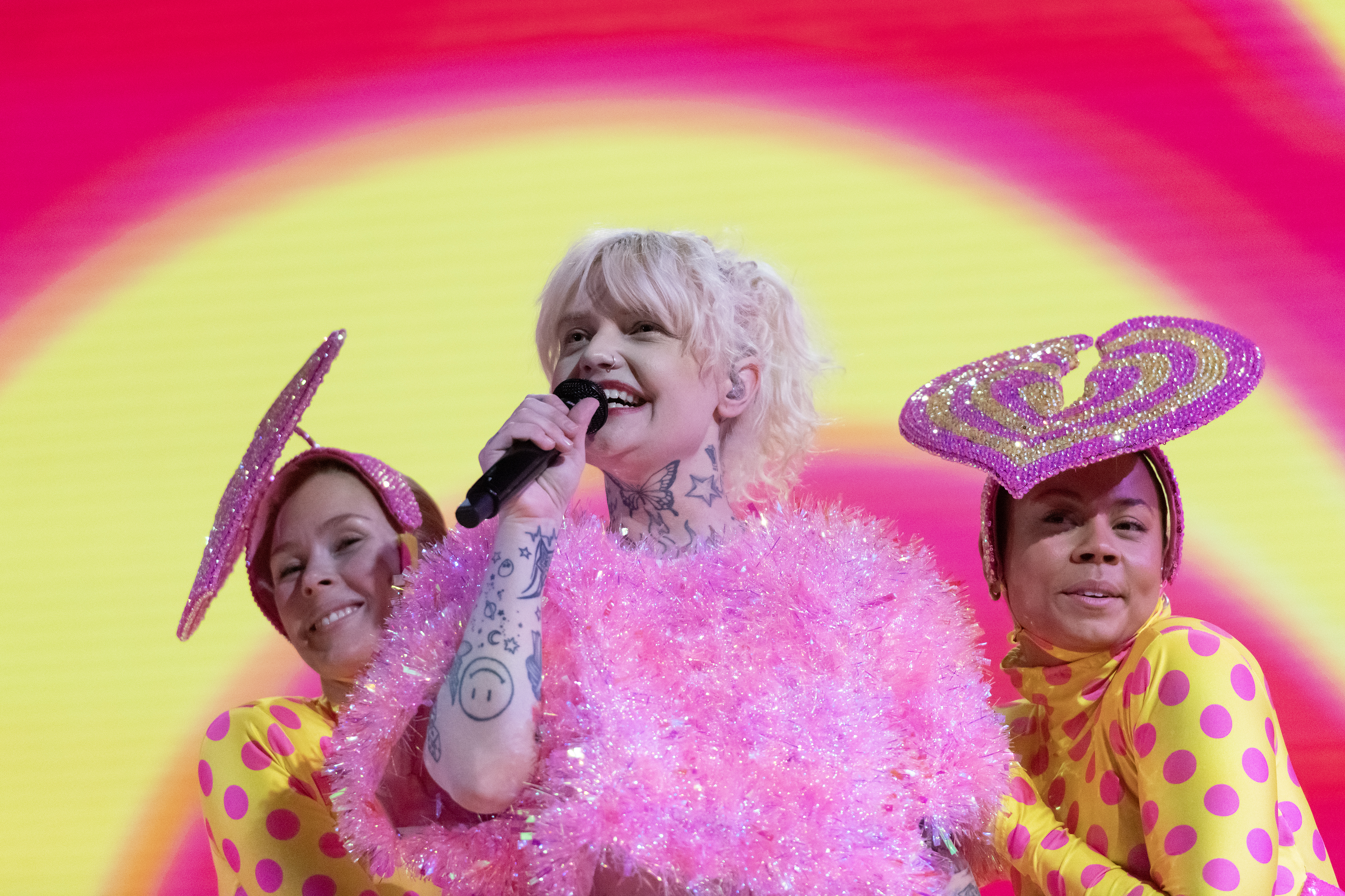
Cazzi Opeia – "Give My Heart a Break"

=== Heat 4 ===
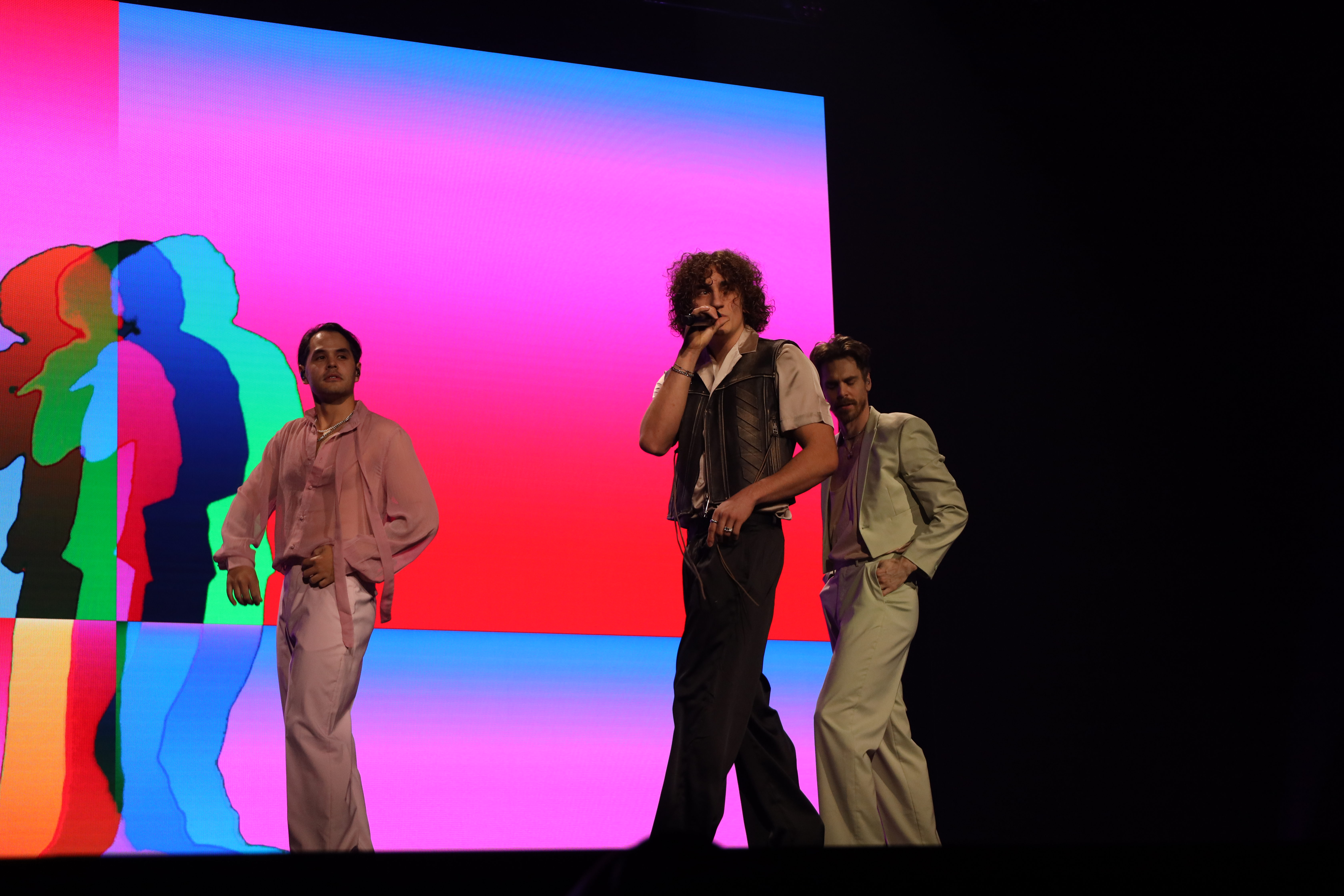
Albin Tingwall – "Done Getting Over You"

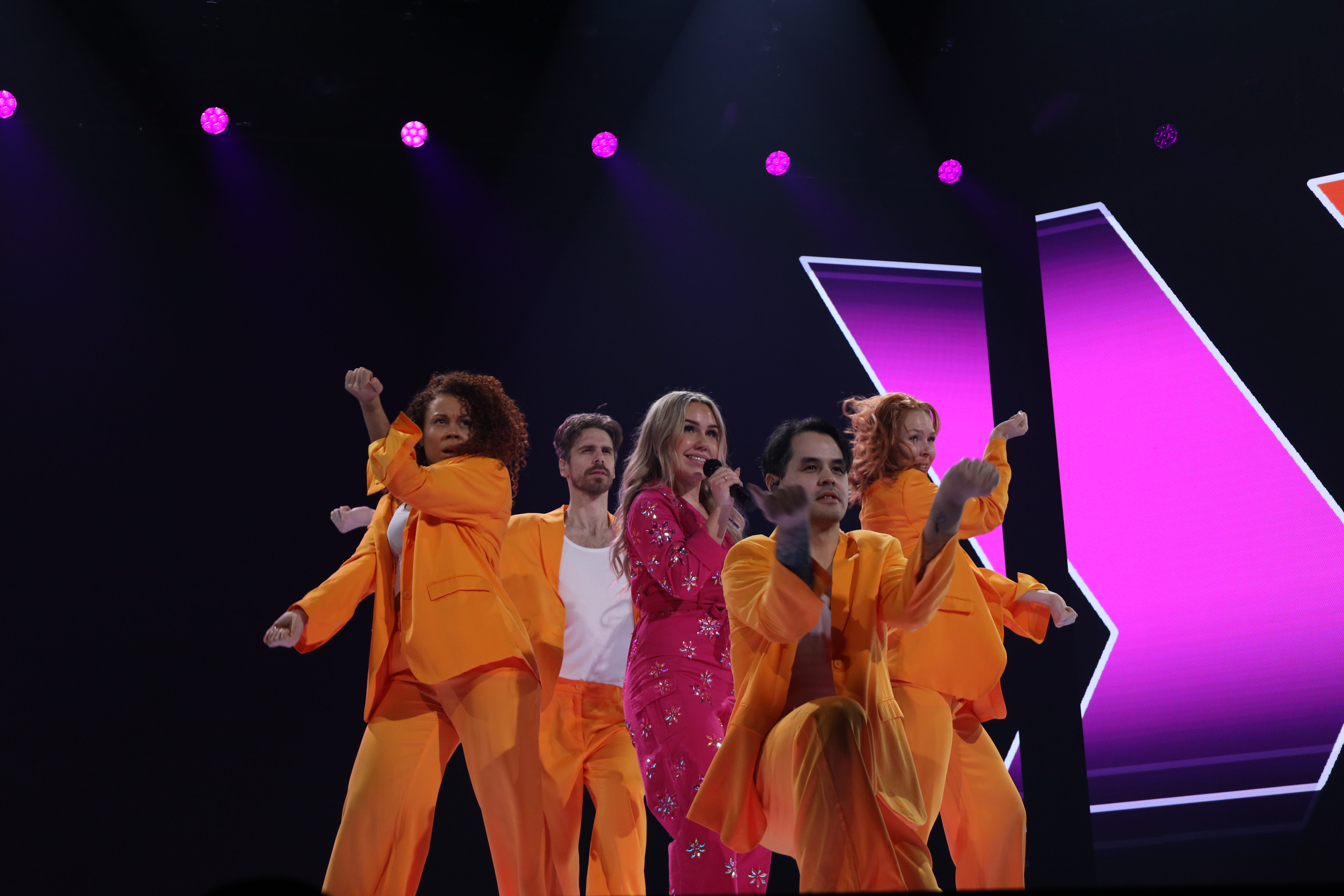
Lia Larsson – "30 km/h"

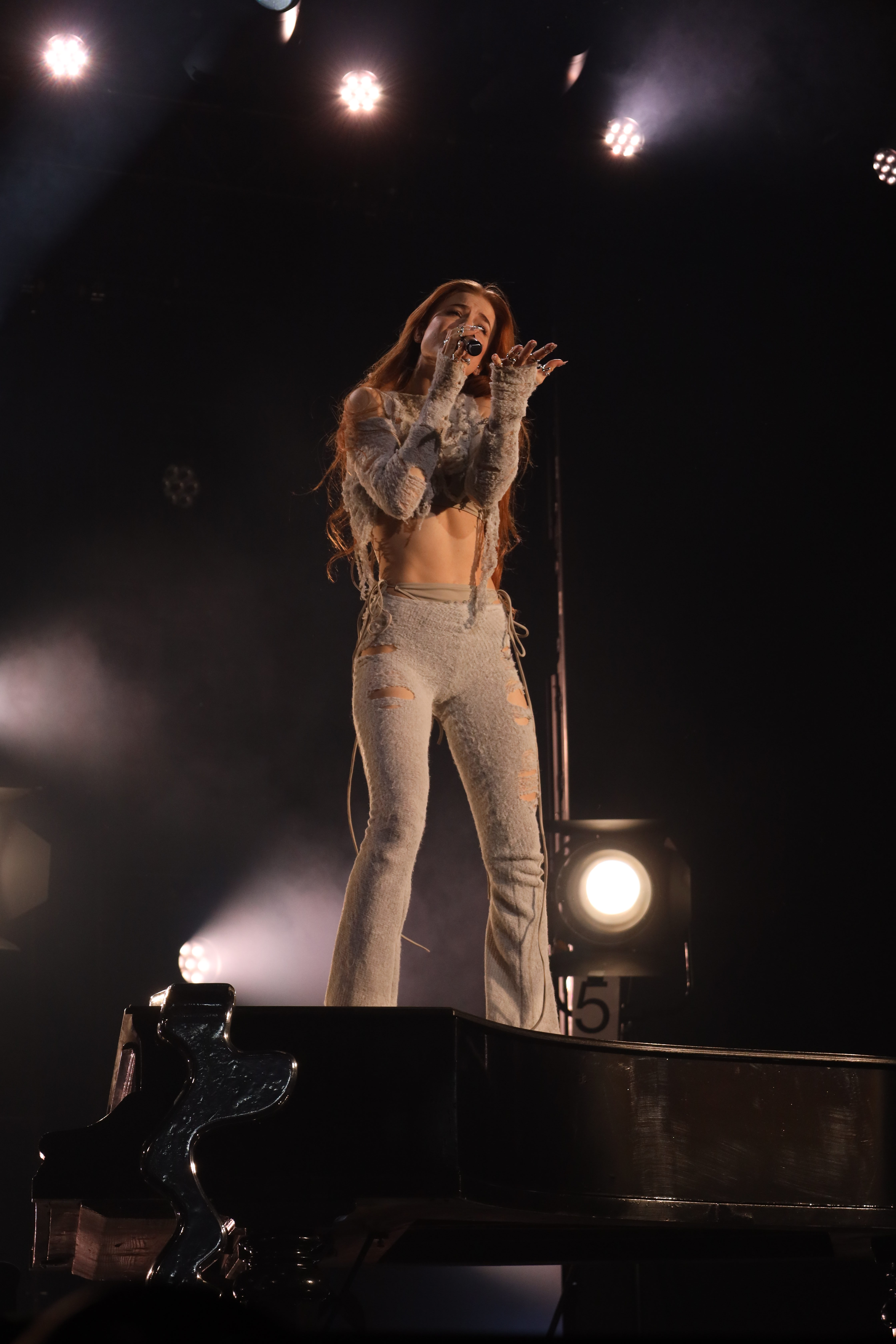
Dotter – "It's Not Easy to Write a Love Song"

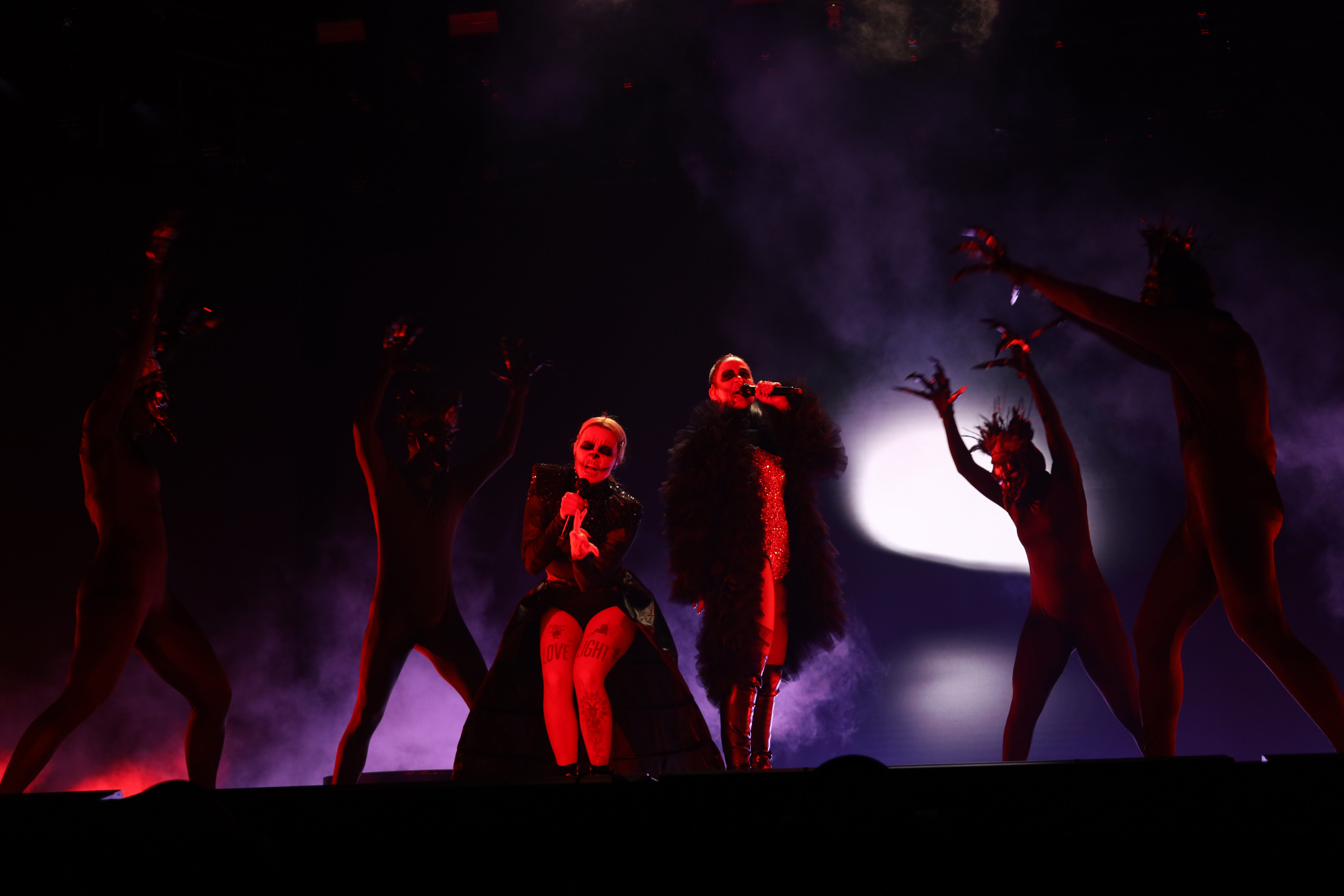
Scarlet – "Circus X"

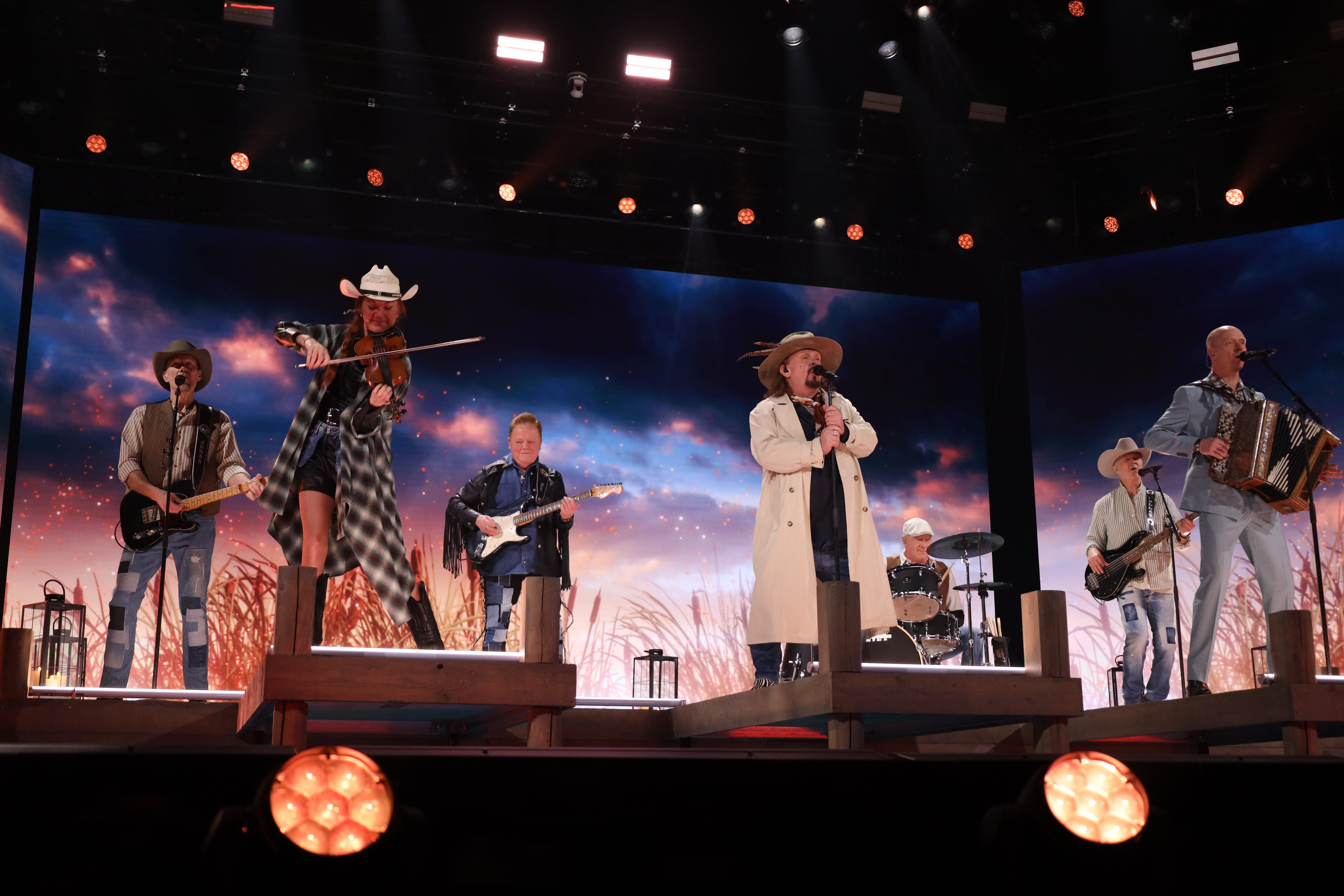
Lasse Stefanz – "En sång on sommaren"

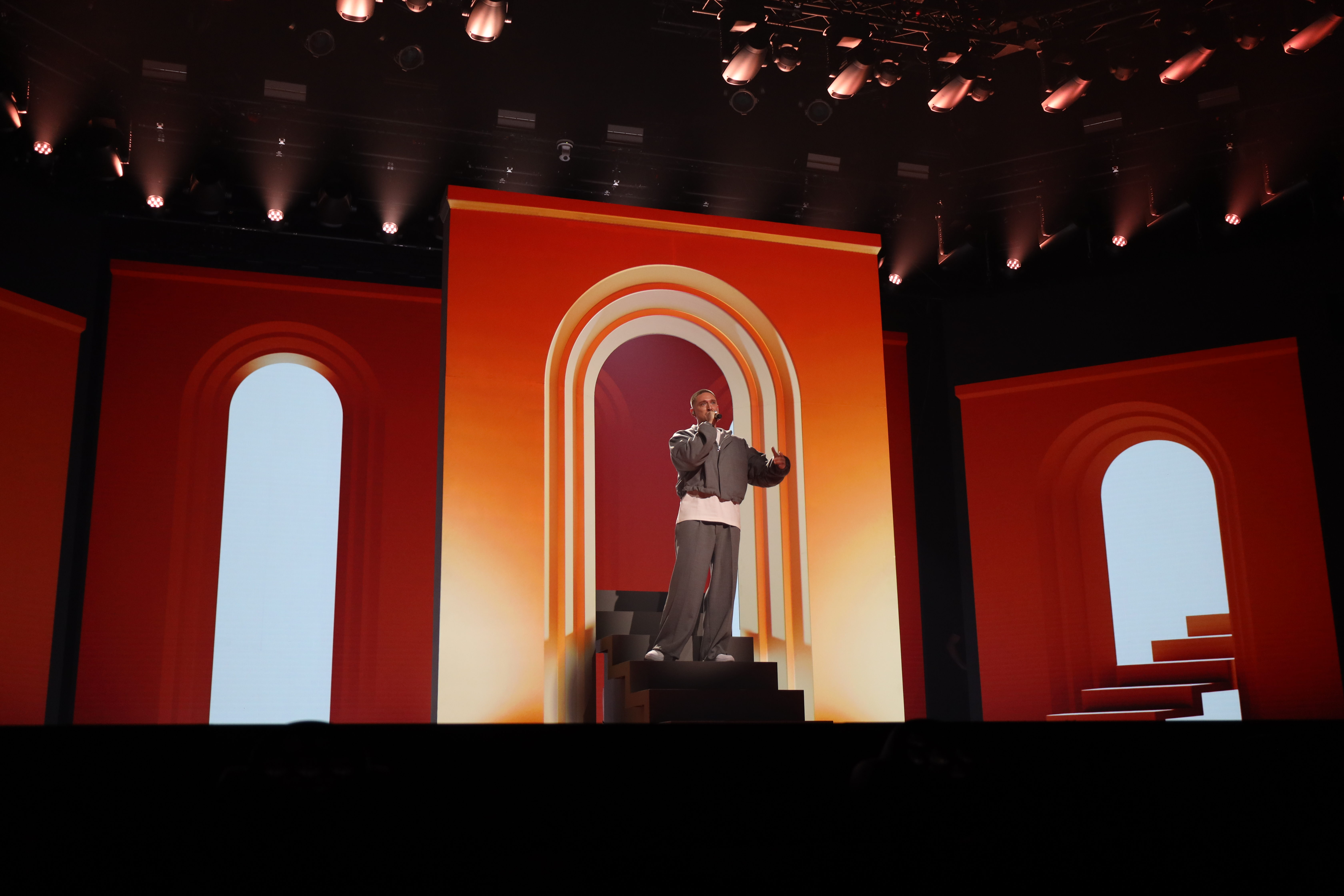
Danny Saucedo – "Happy That You Found Me"

=== Heat 5 ===
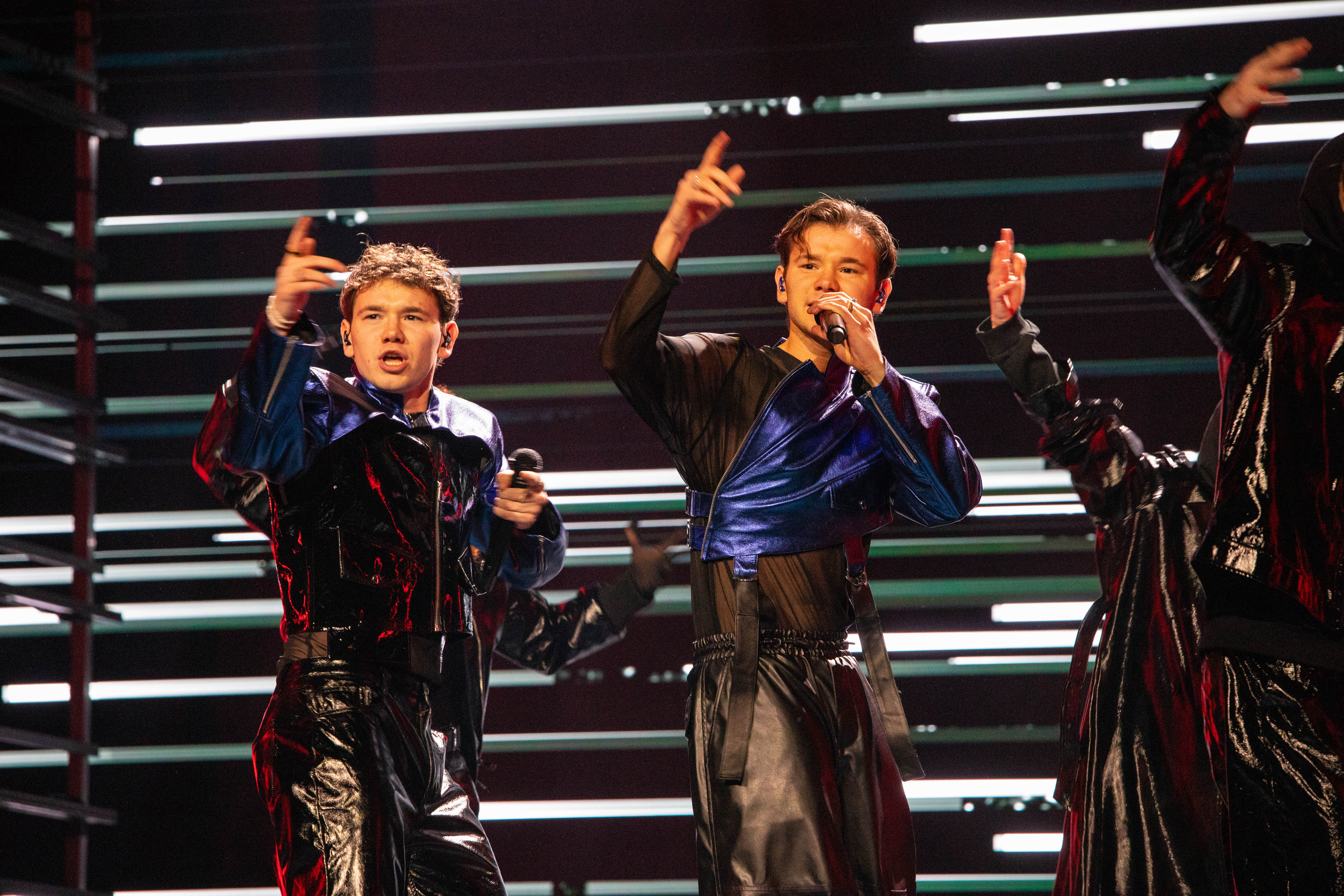
Marcus & Martinus – "Unforgettable"

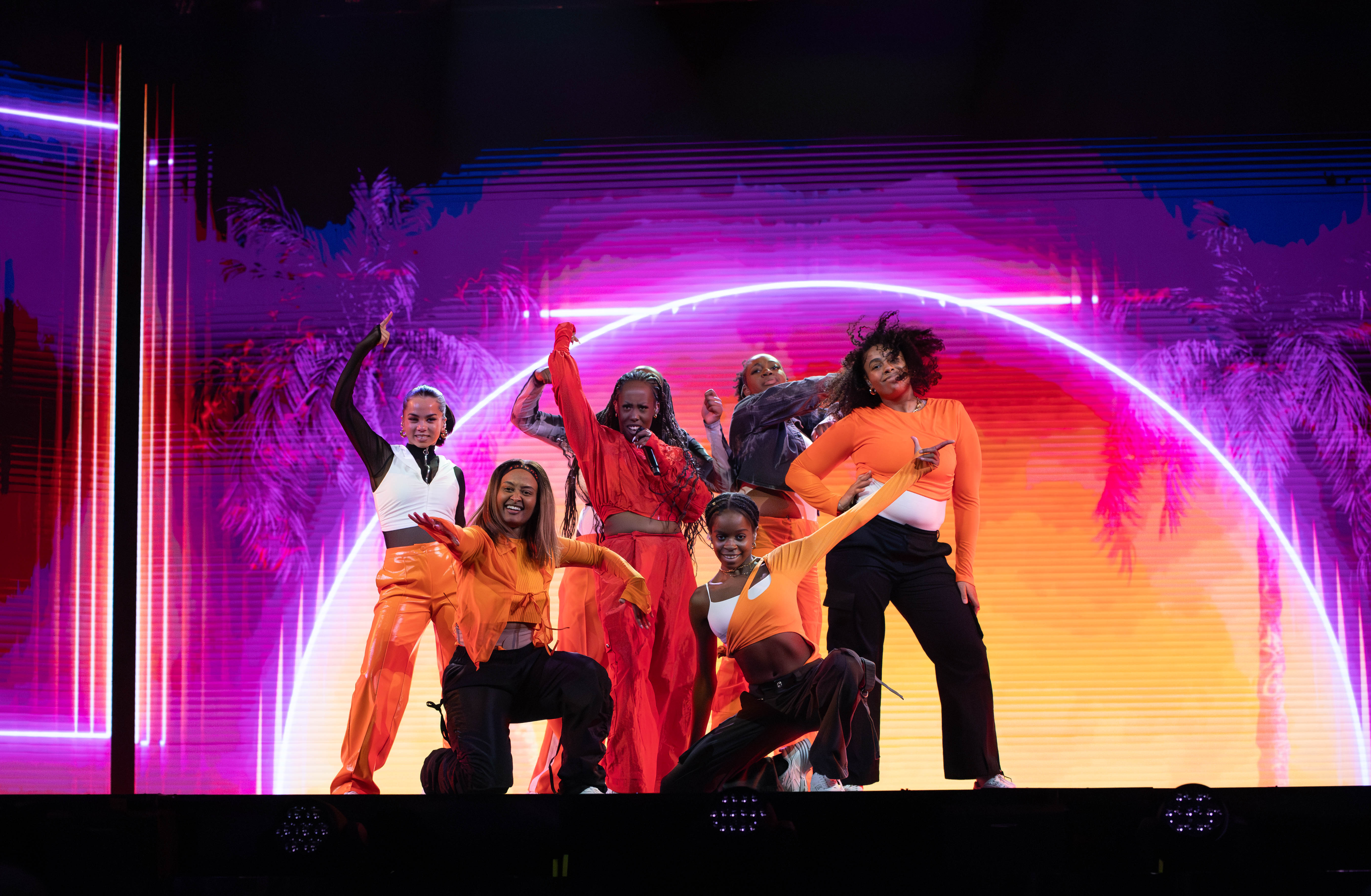
Chelsea Muco – "Controlla"

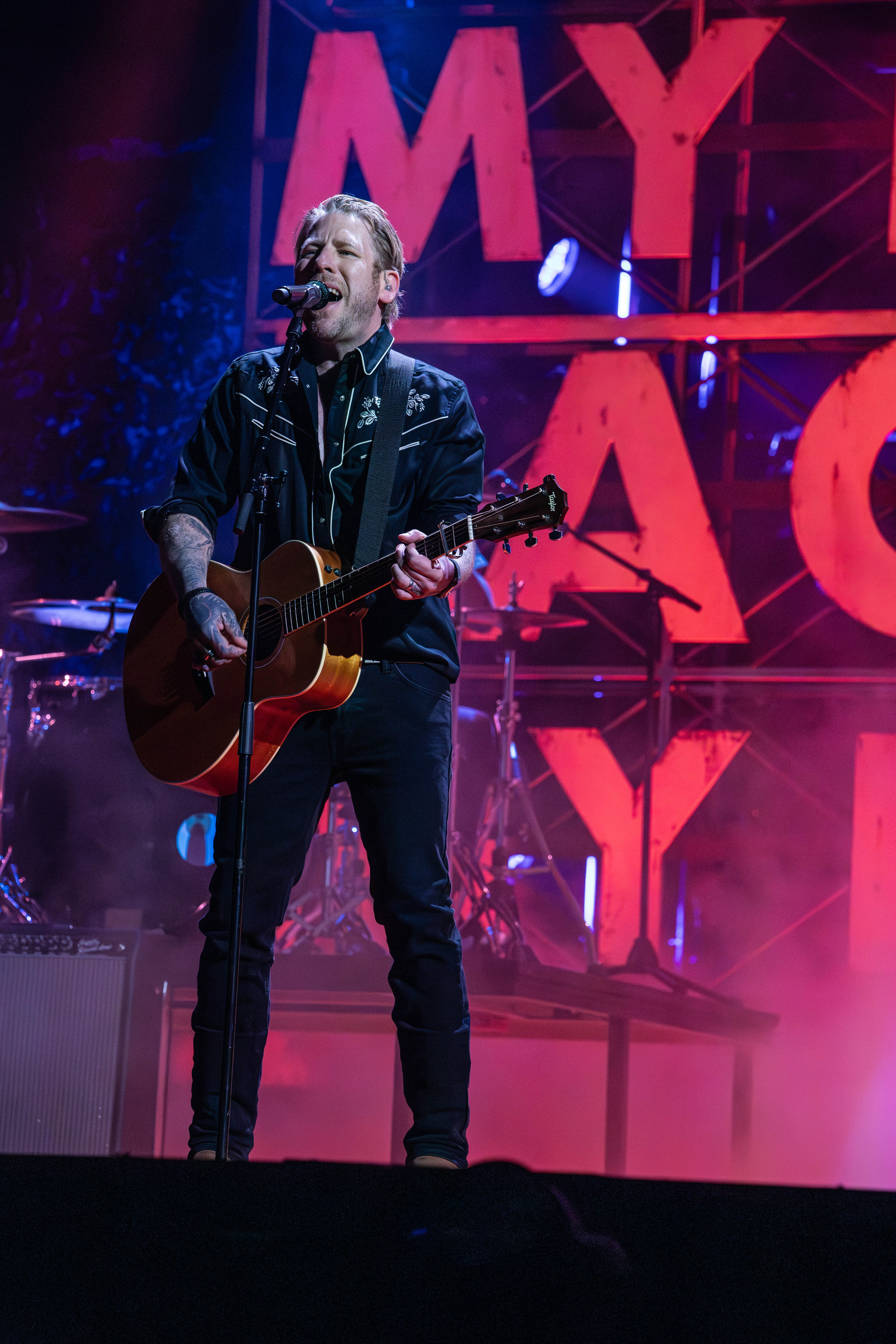
Jay Smith – "Back to My Roots"

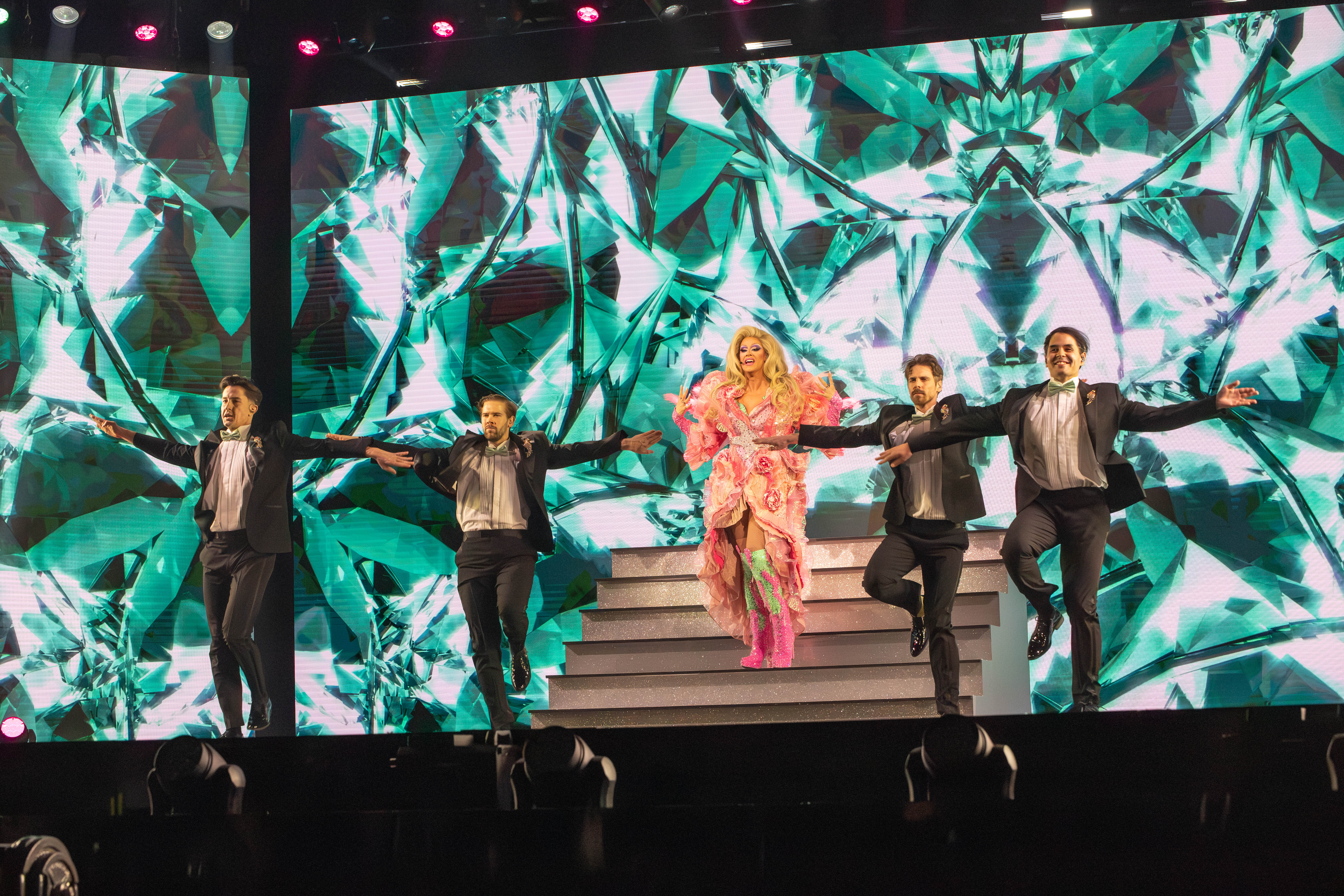
Elecktra – "Banne maj"

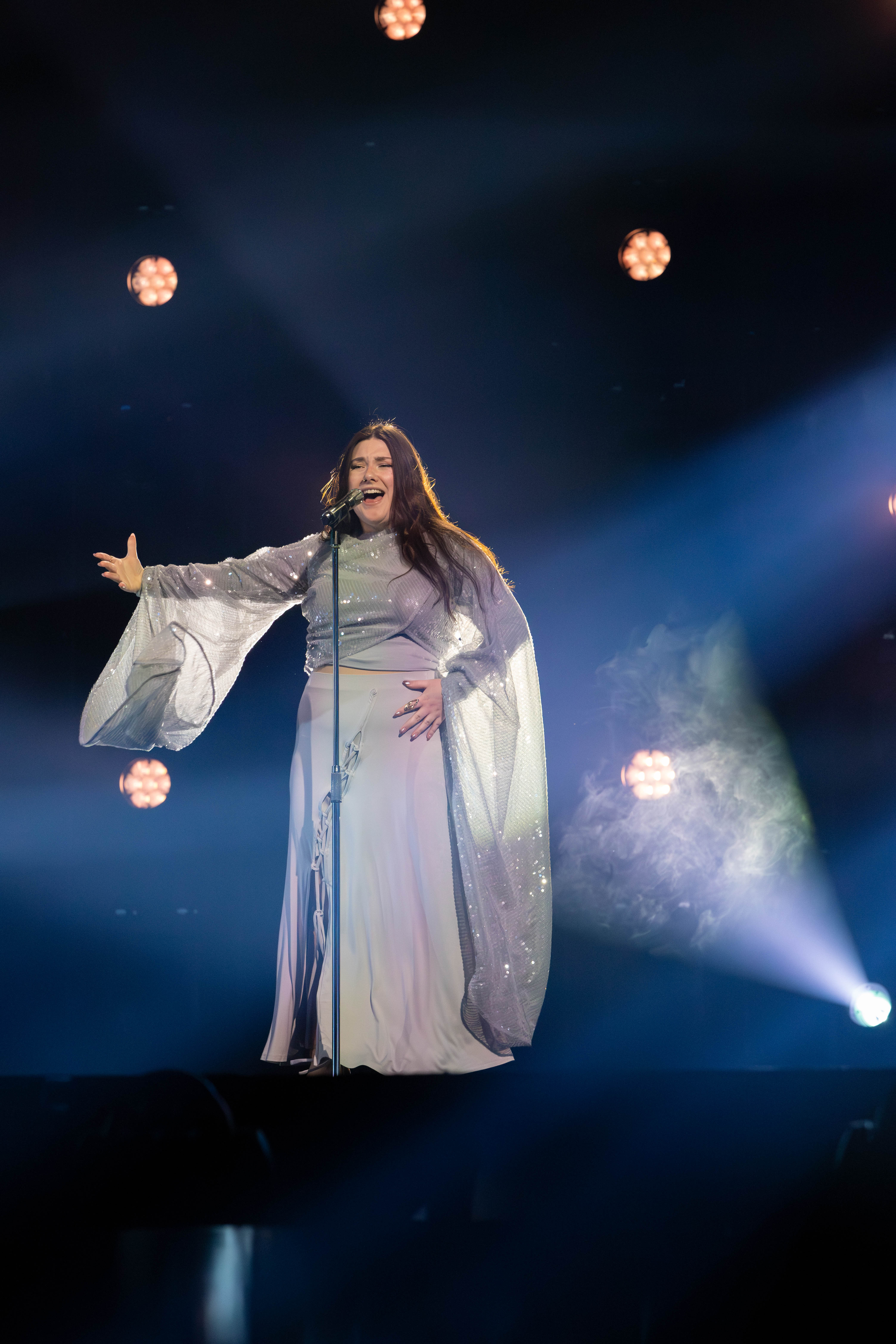
Annika Wickihalder – "Light"

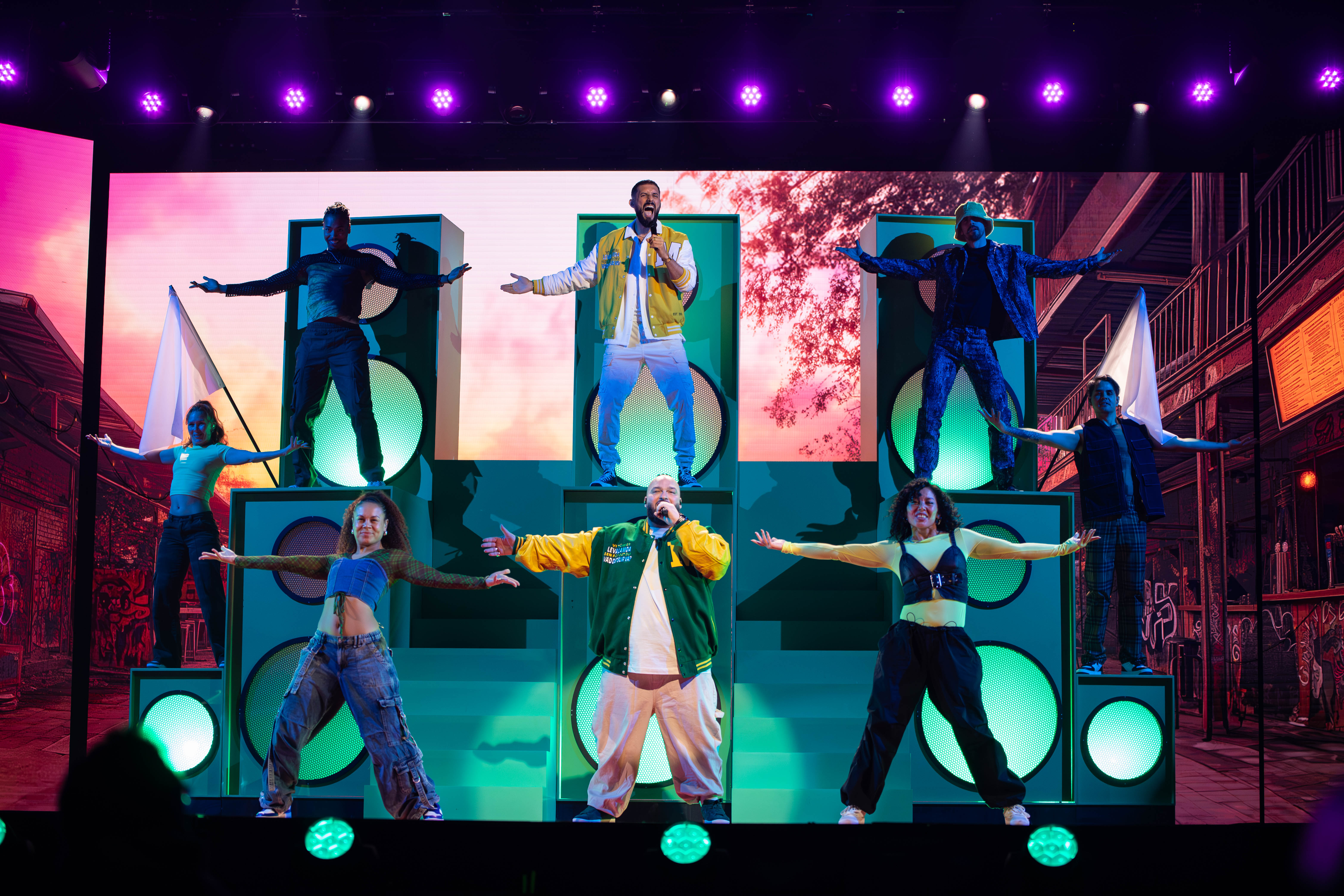
Medina – "Que Sera"
