= Dear Sara (singer) =

Swedish singer

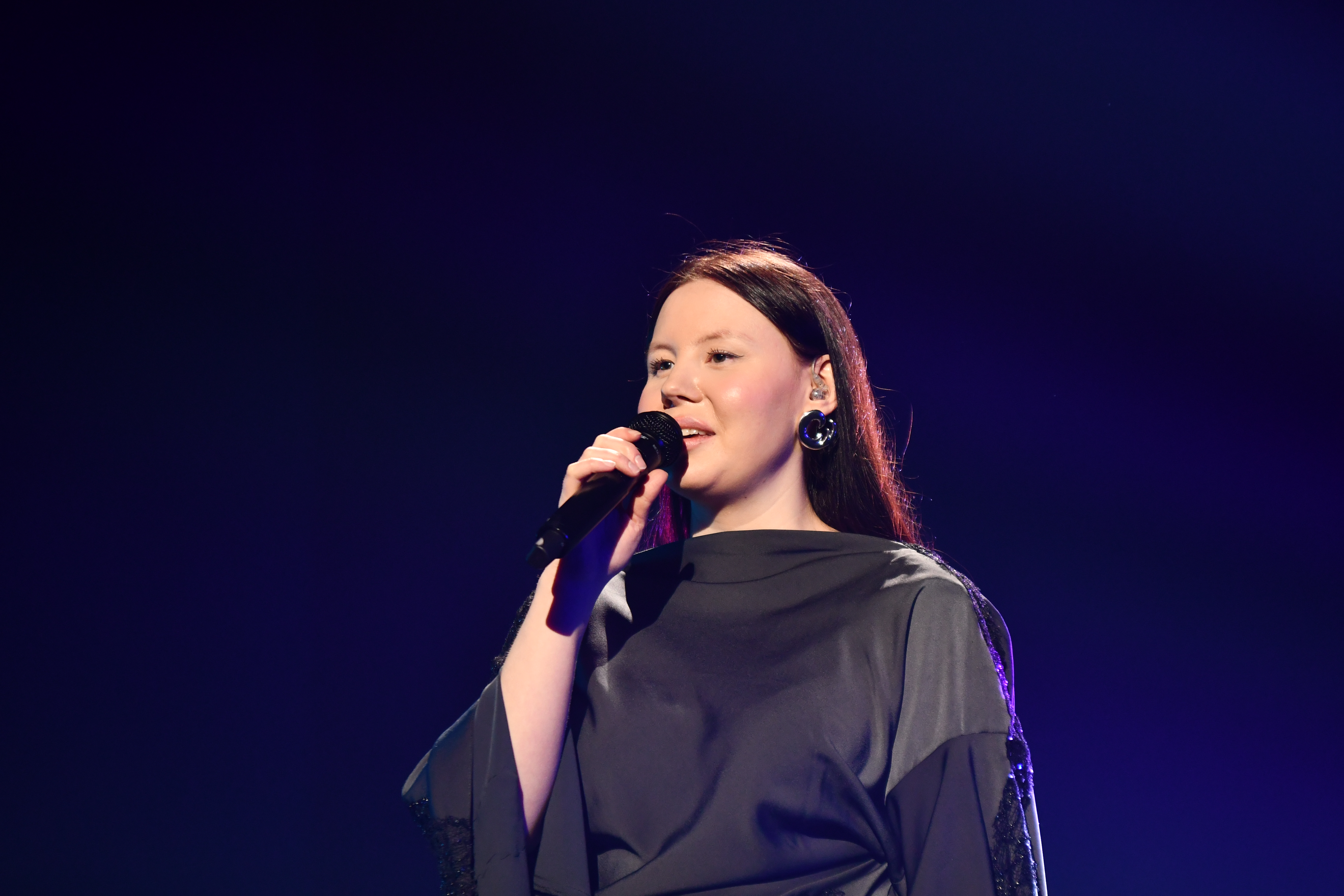
- Dear Sara in 2024

Background information
- Birth name: Sara Kristina Nutti
- Born: 28 January 1996 (age 29); Karesuando, Sweden
- Occupation: Singer

Sara Kristina Nutti (born 16 April 1997), professionally known as Dear Sara, is a Swedish singer. In 2012, she participated in X Factor on TV4, making it to the Judges house before being eliminated in the Girls category. She participated in Melodifestivalen 2024 with the song "The Silence After You", qualifying from her heat for the run-off round but ultimately failing to advance to the final.

== Discography ==
=== Charting singles ===
List of charting singles, with selected peak chart positions
Title	Year	Peak chart positions	Album
Title	Year	SWE	Album
"The Silence After You"	2024	80	Non-album single
