= Klaudy =

Swedish singer

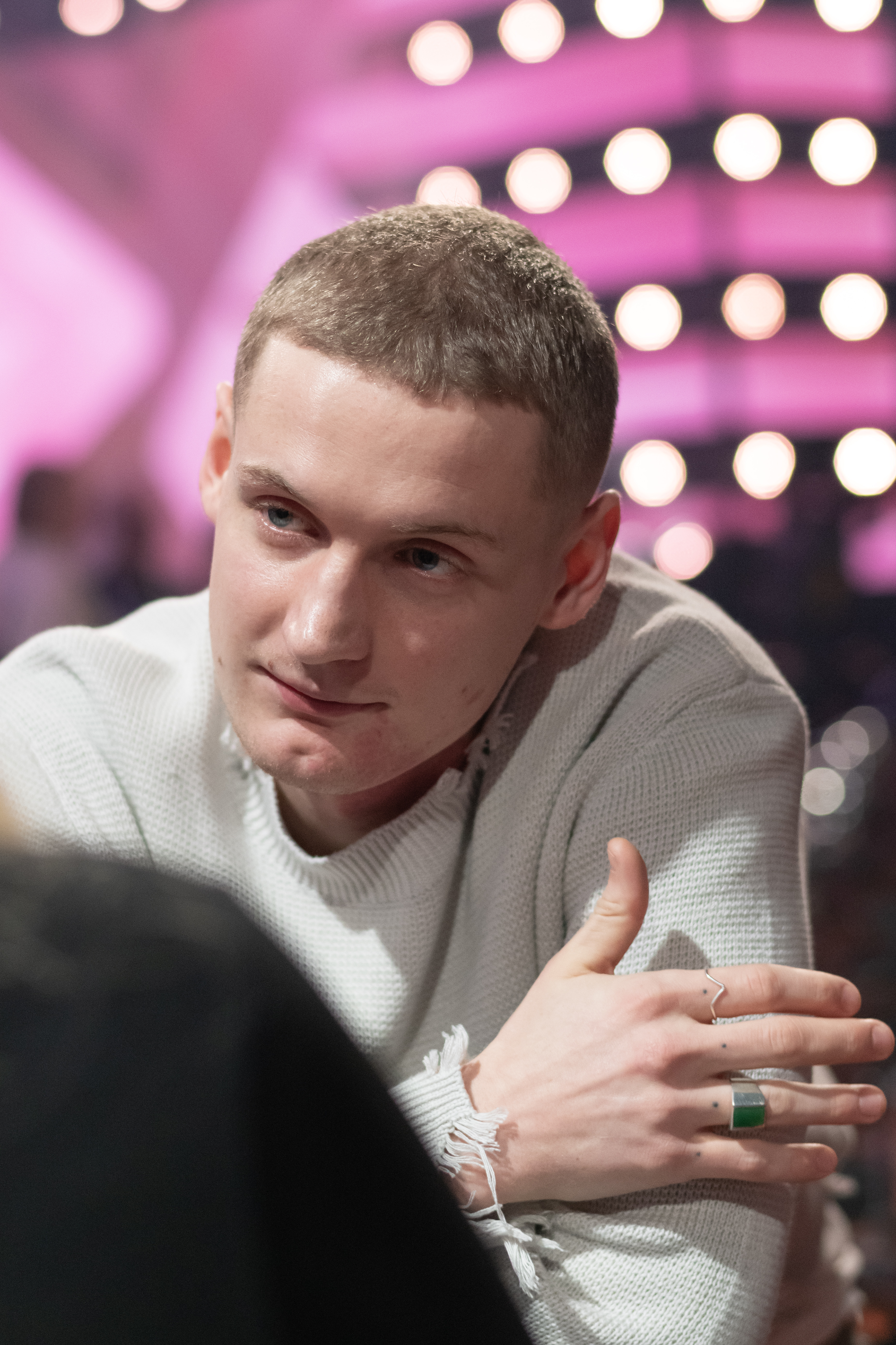
- Klaudy in 2024

Background information
- Birth name: Carl William Didrik Schenberg
- Born: 22 September 1999 (age 25)
- Occupation: Singer

Carl William Didrik Schenberg (born 22 September 1999), known professionally as Klaudy, is a Swedish singer. He participated in Melodifestivalen 2024 with the song "För dig", where it made it to the final qualification round.

== Discography ==
=== Charting singles ===
List of charting singles, with selected peak chart positions
Title	Year	Peak chart positions	Album
Title	Year	SWE	Album
"För dig"	2024	19	Non-album single

=== Songs ===
2021 - NEFERTARI.

2021 - Rough Love.

2022 - Dör För Er Skull.

2022 - Solen i Göteborg, written together with Gustav Blomberg.

2023 - Dansa Med Mig, written together with Gustav Blomberg.

2023 - Långsamt, written together with Gustav Blomberg.

2023 - Sång till Sophie, written together with Joakim Nyström.
