= Gaygalan Awards =

Annual Swedish LGBT achievement awards

- Awarded for: LGBT achievements
- Country: Sweden
- Presented by: QX
- First award: 1999; 27 years ago
- Website: qx.se/noje/gaygala

Established by Swedish magazine QX in 1999, the Gaygalan Awards are an annual event created to hand out prizes for LGBT achievements. In 2004, the gala was broadcast for the first time on Sveriges Television when it was held at Hamburger Börs with Annika Lantz as the host.

== 1999 Winners ==
- QX Honorary Award: Christer Lindarw
- Homo/bi of the Year: Elisabeth Ohlson Wallin
- Hetero of the Year: K. G. Hammar
- Film of the Year: Show Me Love
- Flipp of the Year: EuroPride
- Bar of the Year: Häcktet (Hornsgatan 82, Stockholm)
- Store of the Year: H&M
- Flopp of the Year: Alf Svensson
- Café of the Year: Chokladkoppen (Stortorget, Stockholm)
- DJ of the Year: Christer Broman
- Gay Club of the Year: Propaganda (Mike's, Blekholmsterrassen 15, Stockholm)
- TV Program of the Year: Diggiloo
- Book of the Year: Ecce Homo
- Song of the Year: "Diva" – Dana International

== 2000 Winners ==
- QX Honorary Award: Eva Dahlgren
- Homo/bi of the Year: Jerker Dalman
- Hetero of the Year: Henrik Johnsson
- Film of the Year: All About My Mother
- Flipp of the Year: Stockholm Pride
- Bar of the Year: Side Track (Wollmar Yxkullsgatan 7, Stockholm)
- Store of the Year: Clark's Case
- Flopp of the Year: Ken Ring
- Café of the Year: Chokladkoppen (Stortorget, Stockholm)
- DJ of the Year: Stonebridge
- Gay Club of the Year: Tiptop (Sveavägen 57, Stockholm)
- TV Program of the Year: Expedition: Robinson
- Book of the Year: Bög – så funkar det by Calle Norlén and Jonas Bergstrand
- Song of the Year: "Take Me to Your Heaven" – Charlotte Perrelli
- Restaurant of the Year: Mandus bar och kök (Österlånggatan 7, Stockholm)

== 2001 Winners ==
- QX Honorary Award: Exit
- Homo of the Year: Magnus Carlsson
- Hetero of the Year: Annika Lantz
- Drag of the Year: Björn Kjellman – Once in a Lifetime
- Book of the Year: Paradiset – Liza Marklund
- TV Program of the Year: Nalles show
- Swedish Film of the Year: Once in a Lifetime
- Gay Place of the Year: Mandus
- Store of the Year: Efva Attling
- Gothenburg Prize: Krizz DeeLight

== 2002 Winners ==
- QX Honorary Award: Stig-Åke Petersson
- Homo of the Year: Andreas Lundstedt
- Hetero of the Year: Mona Sahlin
- Drag of the Year: Rickard Engfors
- Gay Place of the Year: Torget
- Restaurant of the Year: Mandus
- Event of the Year: Lena PH on Börsen
- Comeback of the Year: Lena PH
- TV Program of the Year: Queer
- Swedish Song of the Year: "Listen to Your Heartbeat" – Friends
- Book of the Year: Ett UFO gör entré – Jonas Gardell
- Most Enjoyable Evening of the Year: Avslutningsgalan, Stockholm Pride
- Swedish Film of the Year: Sprängaren
- Store of the Year: IKEA
- Advertising of the Year: Stockholm Pride/Ogilvy
- International Film of the Year: Moulin Rouge!
- International Song of the Year: "Can't Get You Out of My Head" – Kylie Minogue
- Gothenburg Prize: Krizz DeeLight
- Öresund Prize: Missis Green – Carl-Peter Licorish
- Flopp of the Year: Gustav von Essen

== 2003 Winners ==
- QX Honorary Award: Ammi Helmadotter
- Homo of the Year: Mathias Holmgren
- Hetero of the Year: Thomas Bodström
- Drag of the Year: Tollie & Dolores
- Gay Place of the Year: Patricia
- Best Staff of the Year: Mandus
- Café of the Year: Chokladkoppen
- DJ of the Year: Christer Broman
- Best Straight Bar of the Year: Olssons skor
- TV Program of the Year: Fame Factory
- Swedish Song of the Year: "Never Let It Go" – Afro-dite
- Artist of the Year: Ola Salo
- Film of the Year: Lilja 4-ever
- Event of the Year: Kikki, Lotta and Bettan at Rondo
- Advertising of the Year: ICA
- Book of the Year: Queerfeministisk Agenda – Tiina Rosenberg
- International Song of the Year: "All the Things She Said" – t.A.T.u.
- Gothenburg Prize: Cockpit
- Öresund Prize: Oscar Bar Café
- Flopp of the Year: Per Unckel

== 2004 Winners ==
- QX Honorary Award: Jerusalem Open House
- Homo of the Year: Sverker Åström
- Hetero of the Year: Elin Ek
- Drag of the Year: Tiffany Persson
- Gay Place of the Year: Lino
- Best Staff of the Year: Mandus
- Café of the Year: Djurgårdsterrassen
- Artist of the Year: Alcazar
- TV Program of the Year: Fab 5
- TV Personality of the Year: Lotta Bromé
- Best Straight Spot of the Year: Blue Moon Bar
- Swedish Song of the Year: Not a Sinner nor a Saint – Alcazar
- International Song of the Year: Everyway That I Can – Sertab Erener
- Swedish Film of the Year: Du ska nog se att det går över
- International Film of the Year: The Hours
- BookElin Ek: Smulklubbens skamlösa systrar – Mian Lodalen
- Event of the Year: Alcazar at Pride
- Gothenburg Prize: Zappho Bar
- Öresund Prize: Wonk

== 2005 Winners ==
- QX Honorary Award: Proud parents of homosexual children
- Homo/bi of the Year: Peter Jöback
- Hetero of the Year: Bishop Caroline Krook
- Drag of the Year: After Dark
- Fighter of the Year: Lars Gårdfeldt
- Artist of the Year: Lena Philipsson
- Comeback of the Year: Lena Philipsson
- Book of the Year: Alla vilda – Birgitta Stenberg
- Show of the Year: La Dolce Vita – After Dark
- Swedish Song of the Year: "Min kärlek" – Shirley Clamp
- International Song of the Year: "Toxic" – Britney Spears
- TV Personality of the Year: Lotta Bromé
- TV Program of the Year: L-word
- Film of the Year: As It Is in Heaven
- Café of the Year: Roxy
- Gay Club of the Year: Lino
- Best Staff of the Year: Populära Sibirien
- Gothenburg Prize: Gretas
- Öresund Prize: Wonk

== 2006 Winners ==
- QX Honorary Award: Göran Bratt
- Homo/bi of the Year: Roger Nordin
- Hetero of the Year: Carin Götblad
- Fighter of the Year: Tiina Rosenberg
- Drag of the Year: Hey Baberiba
- Book of the Year: No tears for queers – Johan Hilton
- Show of the Year: Mamma Mia!
- Swedish Song of the Year: "Håll om mig" – Nanne Grönvall
- International Song of the Year: "Hung Up" – Madonna
- Artist of the Year: Bodies Without Organs
- TV Program of the Year: Desperate Housewives
- TV Personality of the Year: Christine Meltzer
- Gay Club of the Year: Club Conneticon
- Café of the Year: Torget
- Film of the Year: Dalecarlians
- I-don't-believe-my-eyes of the Year: Carola's blomattack at Allsång på Skansen
- We Love You of the Year: Mark Levengood
- Öresund Prize: Wonk
- Gothenburg Prize: Cattis på Castro

== 2007 Winners ==
- QX Honorary Award: The organizers of Riga Pride
- Homo/bi of the Year: Cissi Ramsby
- Hetero of the Year: Sissela Kyle
- Keep-up-the-good-work of the Year: Normal förlag
- Drag of the Year: Diamond Dogs
- Gay Club of the Year: Lino
- Café of the Year: Torget
- Fighter of the Year: Kristian Kabelacs
- Artist of the Year: Lisa Miskovsky
- TV Program of the Year: Ugly Betty
- Show/musical of the Year: Cabaret
- Film of the Year: Brokeback Mountain
- Swedish Song of the Year: "Jag ljuger så bra" – Linda Bengtzing
- International Song of the Year: "I Don't Feel Like Dancin'" – Scissor Sisters
- Book of the Year: Komma ut – Anders Öhrman
- Öresund Prize: Regnbågsfestivalen
- Gothenburg Prize: Gretas

== 2008 Winners ==
- QX Honorary Award: Jonas Gardell
- Homo/bi of the Year: Tomas Tobé
- Hetero of the Year: Mona Sahlin
- Fighter of the Year: Elisabeth Ohlson Wallin
- Duo of the Year: Mia & Klara
- Gay Place of the Year: Gossip, Göteborg
- Oh-a-new-place-to-go-to of the Year: Pigalle, Stockholm
- LGBT-fixed-not-for-real of the Year: Kim in Andra Avenyn (played by Jonas Bane)
- Drag of the Year: Diamond Dogs
- Artist of the Year: Måns Zelmerlöw
- Swedish Song of the Year: "Cara Mia" – Måns Zelmerlöw
- Album of the Year: "Människor som du och jag" – Peter Jöback
- TV Program of the Year: Melodifestivalen 2007
- Scene of the Year: Tillfällig gäst i ditt liv – Jonas Gardell
- Film of the Year: The Queen
- Book of the Year: Luftslottet som sprängdes – Stieg Larsson
- Keep-up-the-good-work of the Year: Daniel Larsson and Andreas Christiansson, founders of Club KAK
- International Song of the Year: Grace Kelly – Mika
- Gothenburg Prize: Gossip
- Öresund Prize: Cabaret Moulin

== 2009 Winners ==
- QX Honorary Award: Hatbrottsjouren
- Homo of the Year: Andreas Lundstedt
- Hetero of the Year: Gustaf Skarsgård
- Fighter of the Year: Jan Wisén, Brandförsvaret
- Gay Place of the Year: Gossip (Göteborg)
- Artist of the Year: Amanda Jenssen
- Swedish Song of the Year: "Empty Room" – Sanna Nielsen
- International Song of the Year: "I Kissed a Girl" – Katy Perry
- Breakthrough of the Year: Björn Gustafsson
- Film of the Year: Patrik, Age 1.5
- Scene of the Year: Dina dagar är räknade by Sissela Kyle
- Duo of the Year: Gustaf Skarsgård and Torkel Peterson
- Drag of the Year: Fashion pack
- Blog of the Year: Per-Robins Gaybloggen
- TV Program of the Year: Bonde söker fru
- TV Star of the Year: Björn Gustafsson
- Book of the Year: Mamma, mormor & jag – Kim Kärnfalk
- Keep-up-the-good-work of the Year: Volontärerna at Stockholm Pride
- Gothenburg Prize: Gossip
- Öresund Prize: Copenhagen Gay & Lesbian Film Festival

== 2010 Winners ==
- QX Honorary Award: Cherin and Mohammed from the Sämre än djur documentary
- Homo/bi of the Year: Mariette Hansson
- Hetero of the Year: Noomi Rapace
- Keep-up-the-good-work of the Year: The rainbow project at the maternity care Mama Mia
- Scene of the Year: No tears for queers
- Book of the Year: Halva liv – Mats Strandberg
- TV Program of the Year: Svenska Hollywoodfruar
- TV Star of the Year: Petra Mede
- Drag of the Year: Rolf Lassgård – Edna Turnblad in Hairspray
- Duo of the Year: Christer Lindarw & Babsan
- Årets vi-älskar-dig: Maria Montazami
- Film of the Year: The Girl with the Dragon Tattoo
- Gothenburg Prize: Gretas, Göteborg (nattklubb)
- Öresund Prize: Wonk, Malmö (nattklubb)
- International Song of the Year: "Bad Romance" – Lady Gaga
- Swedish Song of the Year: "Snälla, snälla" – Caroline af Ugglas
- Artist of the Year: Agnes Carlsson
- Gay Place of the Year: Zipper, Stockholm

== 2011 Winners ==
- QX Honorary Award: Joel Burns, American politician
- Homo/bi of the Year: Elisabeth Ohlson Wallin
- Hetero of the Year: Birgitta Ohlsson
- Keep-up-the-good-work of the Year: Markus Gisslén – Bee Bar i Göteborg
- Scene of the Year: Mia Skäringer – Dyngkåt och hur helig som helst
- Book of the Year: Tiger by Mian Lodalen
- TV Program of the Year: Så mycket bättre
- TV Star of the Year: Maria Montazami
- Drag of the Year: Dark Ladies
- Duo of the Year: Prinsessan Victoria and Prins Daniel
- Årets vi-älskar-dig: Maria Montazami
- Film of the Year: Fyra år till
- Gothenburg Prize: HBTQ-festivalen
- Öresund Prize: Wonk
- International Song of the Year: "Telephone" – Lady Gaga & Beyoncé
- Swedish Song of the Year: "Dancing on My Own" – Robyn
- Artist of the Year: Robyn
- Gay Place of the Year: Momma (Stockholm)
- QX Honorary Award: Joel Burns

== 2012 Winners ==
- QX Honorary Award: Expo
- Homo/bi/trans of the Year: Anton Hysén
- Hetero of the Year: David Lazar
- Keep-up-the-good-work of the Year: Ulrika Westerlund, RFSL
- Scene of the Year: "Angels in America" – Stockholm City Theatre
- Book of the Year: "Allt eller inget" – Rickard Engfors
- TV Program of the Year: Så mycket bättre
- TV Star of the Year: Roy Fares
- Drag of the Year: Diamond Dogs
- Duo of the Year: Judit & Judit – Comhem
- Film of the Year: With Every Heartbeat
- International Song of the Year: "Born This Way" – Lady Gaga
- Swedish Song of the Year: "My Heart is Refusing Me" – Loreen
- Artist of the Year: Laleh
- Club of the Year: Paradise Sthlm
- Restaurant/bar/café of the Year: Bee Bar
- Party Fixer of the Year: Katja & Gunn

== 2013 Winners ==
- QX Honorary Award: Uganda's LGBTQ activists (prize picked up by Jimmy and Lawrence)
- Homo/bi/trans of the Year: Jonas Gardell
- Hetero of the Year: Soran Ismail
- Keep-up-the-good-work of the Year: Alf Kjeller (for the work with Stockholm Pride)
- Scene of the Year: After Dark
- Book of the Year: "Torka aldrig tårar utan handskar: Kärleken" – Jonas Gardell
- TV Program of the Year: Don't Ever Wipe Tears Without Gloves
- TV Star of the Year: Simon J Berger – "Torka aldrig Tårar utan handskar"
- Drag of the Year: After Dark
- Duo of the Year: Adam Pålsson and Adam Lundgren (play the main roles in Don't Ever Wipe Tears Without Gloves)
- Film of the Year: Cockpit
- Song of the Year: "Euphoria" – Loreen
- Artist of the Year: Darin
- Gay Place of the Year: Bee Bar

== 2014 Winners ==
- QX Honorary Award: Barbro Westerholm, among other things because she 35 years ago made sure that the National Board of Health and Welfare removed the disease stamp on homosexuals
- Homo/bi/trans of the Year: Nilla Fischer
- Hetero of the Year: Emma Green Tregaro
- Keep-up-the-good-work of the Year: Sean Kelly
- Scene of the Year: Priscilla
- Book of the Year: "Sjukdomen och Döden" – Jonas Gardell
- TV Program of the Year: Eurovision Song Contest 2013
- TV Star of the Year: Gina Dirawi
- Drag of the Year: Björn Kjellman
- Film of the Year: Blue Is the Warmest Colour
- Song of the Year: "Wake Me Up" – Avicii
- International Song of the Year: "Same Love" – Macklemore & Ryan Lewis
- Artist of the Year: Peter Jöback
- Gay Place of the Year: Kolingsborg, Stockholm

== 2015 Winners ==
- QX Honorary Award: The eight pride festivals that had their first parade in 2014; Pajala, Lund, Falkenberg, Karlskrona, Hudiksvall, Falun, Sapmi, Skellefteå
- Homo/bi/trans of the Year: Silvana Imam
- Hetero of the Year: Johan Köhler
- Keep-up-the-good-work of the Year: Kiruna IF Hockey
- Scene of the Year: Once in a Lifetime Musical
- Book of the Year: En liten handbok i konsten att bli lesbisk – Mian Lodalen and Matilda Tudor
- TV Program of the Year: Orange Is the New Black
- Drag of the Year: Peter Jöback for the role of Candy Darling in Once in a Lifetime Musical
- Song of the Year: "Freak" – Molly Sandén
- Artist of the Year: Alcazar
- Club of the Year: Candy, Stockholm
- Restaurant/bar of the Year: Urban Deli Nytorget, Stockholm
- Moment of the Year: Conchita Wurst winning Eurovision Song Contest 2014
- Duo of the Year: Christine Meltzer and Carina Berg

== 2016 Winners ==
- QX Honorary Award: Rikard Wolff
- Homo/bi/trans of the Year: Rickard Söderberg
- Hetero of the Year: Malena Ernman
- Book of the Year: Kommer du tycka om mig nu? – Lina Axelsson Kihlblom
- Film of the Year: Holy Mess
- Club of the Year: King Kong
- Restaurant of the Year: Bee Bar i Göteborg
- Keep-up-the-good-work of the Year: RFSL Newcomers
- Duo of the Year: Anton Lundqvist and Anastasios Soulis
- Drag of the Year: Cabaret Moulin
- TV Star of the Year: Johan Rehborgs's character Morran
- Artist of the Year: Miriam Bryant
- Song of the Year: "Heroes" – Måns Zelmerlöw
- Scene of the Year: Alcazar – Disco Defenders

== 2017 Winners ==
- Homo/bi of the Year: Oscar Zia
- Trans of the Year: Cameron Jai
- Hetero of the Year: Peter Pettersson
- Keep-up-the-good-work of the Year: GazeNet
- Drag of the Year: After Dark
- Club of the Year: Gretas
- Restaurant/bar of the Year: Bee Bar
- Duo of the Year: Petra Mede and Måns Zelmerlöw
- International TV Program of the Year: Skam
- Swedish TV Program of the Year: Eurovision Song Contest 2016
- Swedish Song of the Year: "Bara få va´mig själv" – Laleh
- International Song of the Year: "Can't Stop the Feeling!" – Justin Timberlake
- Scene of the Year: "This Is It" – After Dark
- Book of the Year: "This Is My Life" – Christer Lindarw
- Film of the Year: The Danish Girl
- Moment of the Year: The Sweden-Brazil match in this summer's Olympics
- LGBT-YouTuber of the Year: Tone Sekelius
- Honorary Award of the Year: Posthumously to Christopher Leinonen, one of the 2016 Orlando nightclub shooting victims

== 2018 Winners ==
- Homo/bi of the Year: Christer Lindarw
- Trans of the Year: Viktoria Harrysson
- Hetero of the Year: Anders Nilsson
- Club of the Year: Backdoor
- Restaurant/bar of the Year: Mälarpaviljongen
- Keep-up-the-good-work of the Year: Martin Kallur
- Swedish Song of the Year: "A Million Years" – Mariette Hansson
- International Song of the Year: "Symphony" – Clean Bandit with Zara Larsson
- Movie of the Year: Moonlight
- Swedish TV Program of the Year: "Vår tid är nu"
- International TV Program of the Year: Skam
- TV Star of the Year: Petra Mede
- Duo of the Year: Kajsa Bergqvist and Peter Häggström
- Book of the Year: Christer Björkman – "Generalen (bara jag vet vem som vinner)"
- Drag of the Year: Admira Thunderpussy
- Scene of the Year: The Book of Mormon
- Honorary Award of the Year: Moscow Community Center for LGBT+ initiatives

== 2019 Winners ==
- LGBT of the Year: Caroline Farberger
- LGBTQ Friend of the Year: DJ Méndez
- Drag of the Year: Cherry Wilder
- Film of the Year: Bohemian Rhapsody
- Place of the Year: Secret Garden
- Song of the Year: "Shallow" – Lady Gaga & Bradley Cooper
- Scene of the Year: No More Fucks to Give – Mia Skäringer
- TV Program of the Year: Vår tid är nu
- Book of the Year: Såna som du ska inte va här – Marika Carlsson
- Everyday Hero of the Year: Jenni Steiner
- Award of the Year: Patrik Hermansson

== 2020 Winners ==
- Homo/bi/trans/queer of the Year: Tobias Karlsson
- Hetero of the Year: Albin Ekdal
- Drag of the Year: Miss Vanity
- Film of the Year: And Then We Danced
- Place of the Year: Secret Garden
- Song of the Year: "Det bästa kanske inte hänt än" – Molly Sandén
- Keep-up-the-good-work of the Year: Regnbågsblod
- Best of the Year: Women's Football Bronze
- Scene of the Year: It Takes a Fool to Remain Sane
- TV Program of the Year: Vår tid är nu
- TV Star of the Year: Marianne Mörck
- Book of the Year: Inte alltid en dans på rosor

== 2021 Winners ==
- LGBTQ of the Year: Darin
- Hetero of the Year: Victoria, Crown Princess of Sweden
- Drag of the Year: Carnita Molida
- Film of the Year: Min pappa Marianne
- Duo of the Year: Edvin Törnblom and Johanna Nordström
- Place of the Year: Mälarpaviljongen
- Song of the Year: "En säng av rosor" – Darin
- Keep-up-the-good-work of the Year: SHL Pride Week
- Scene of the Year: Fucking Åmål
- TV Program of the Year: Så mycket bättre
- TV Star of the Year: Benjamin Ingrosso
- Book of the Year: "Lisa & Lilly" by Mian Lodalen
- QX Honorary Award: Jan Hammarlund

== 2022 Winners ==
- LGBTQ of the Year: Tone Sekelius
- Hetero of the Year: Benjamin Ingrosso
- Duo of the Year: Omar Rudberg and Edvin Ryding
- TV Star of the Year: Christer Lindarw
- Drag of the Year: Imaa Queen
- TV Program of the Year: "Young Royals"
- Book of the Year: "Ett lyckligare år" by Jonas Gardell
- Song of the Year: "Don't shut me down" by ABBA
- Film of the Year: "Who the fuck is Bobby?"
- Scene of the Year: Darin Akustiskt
- Keep-up-the-good-work of the year: Lars Gårdfeldt
- Place of the year: Secret Garden

== 2023 Winners ==
- LGBTQ of the Year: Edvin Törnblom
- Hetero of the Year: Hasret Bozarslan
- Drag of the Year: After Dark
- Place of the year: The Blue Oyster
- Book of the Year: "Bögen är lös" by Edvin Törnblom
- Film of the Year: "Hilma"
- TV Program of the Year: "Young Royals"
- Song of the Year: "Ingen annan rör mig som du" by Molly Hammar
- TV Star of the Year: Edvin Ryding
- Scene of the Year: Club After Dark
- Duo of the Year: Edvin Törnblom and Johanna Nordström
- Keep-up-the-good-work of the year: Lady Busty & Miss Shameless
- QX Honorary Award: Mian Lodalen
