= Isabel Adrian =

Swedish television personality

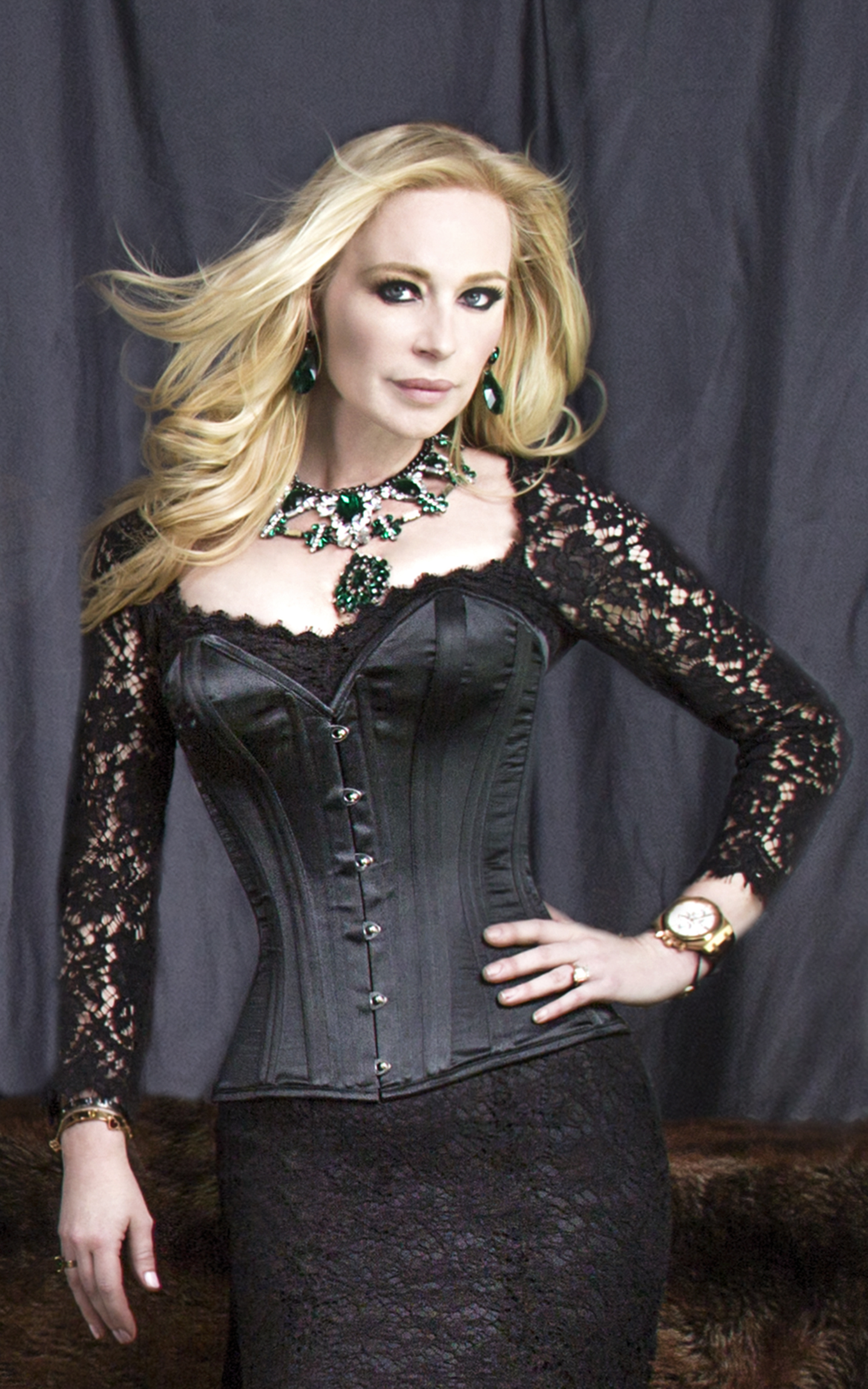
- Born: 30 August 1977 (age 49); Gothenburg, Sweden
- Education: Bachelor's degree in Journalism
- Occupations: Television personality, producer, author, designer, blogger
- Years active: 2004–present
- Notable work: Book: Sex Droger och en DJ
- Spouse: Steve Angello
- Children: 2

Isabel Maria Adrian Angello (born 30 August 1977) is a Swedish television personality, producer, author and model. She was a contestant in Expedition Robinson 2004 which was broadcast on TV3 and also made a centerfold in the men's magazine Café in the same year. Adrian has worked as a model. She is a well-known Swedish and international blogger and a clothing designer.

== Early life ==
At the age of 15, Isabel moved out of her home and began her modeling career, traveling all over the world. After five years of being a successful runway model, including over 350 runway shows and being a cover girl for numerous publications like Sony, Chic Magazine, Elle and Rolling Stone, she grew tired of the industry and decided to focus on her education. She enrolled in Film and Design School and received her bachelor's degree in Journalism. After graduating, she moved to Stockholm and was asked to appear in Expedition Robinson, which was later turned into Survivor in America. Isabel began to work for Size Records as a merchandise designer and traveled with the group all across the world.

== Career ==
Isabel and Steve moved to Los Angeles in 2008. Isabel was cast in Swedish Hollywood Housewives, which she starred in for the next four years in episodes 3, 4, and 5. In 2015 Isabel did a comeback in season 9. In 2014 Isabel was cast as one of the co-stars in the reality show Euros of Hollywood for Bravo, which is an American reality documentary television series on Bravo that premiered on 3 November 2014 Other cast members of the show were Massimo Dobrovic, Fawni, Sascha Gerecht, Jannik Olander and Bleona Qereti. Later on the show was also aired in Sweden and Australia.

In 2013, Isabel and her friend Rebecca Stella released a podcast at Expressen called Isabel och Rebeccas podcast. It turned out to be a success, and after only its first episode it was ranked number one on iTunes. In this podcast Isabel and Rebecca discuss everything from work, every-day life to what inspires them as individuals. The podcast was released on Expressen as well as on iTunes and they did a total of 50 episodes.

In 2014, Isabel released her best-selling book Sex, Drugs and The DJ. The fictional book is loosely based on Adrian's personal experiences. The book showcases the rise of electronic dance music and the people who are along for the ride. Her book is a love story involving hate, greed, envy, success, and music. At the beginning of 2016, Isabel had teamed up with her husband Steve Angello to produce a feature film based on the book. For the movie she created the music video and song, Bring Me Light together with Audrey Napoleon.

In 2015, Isabel and her husband Steve appeared on one episode of Arga Snickaren VIP together, where Isabel received a new office built by the team which aired on Kanal 5. In 2015 they also attended the Swedish television show Renées Brygga as a couple.

In 2018, Isabel Adrian was one of the co-hosts at Diabetesgalan.

== Production company ==
Life in the heart of Hollywood inspired Isabel to establish her own production company, LaLa Studios. There, she photographs actors' headshots, films scenes for their reels, and develops her own film and television projects. She also produces plays for local theatres.

== Reality show ==
In 2016, Adrian has been one of the co-stars of the reality show Realitystjärnorna på Godset. She was also one of the competing stars in Let's Dance on TV4 (Dancing with the Stars in America) where she danced with the professional dancer Fredric Brunberg. Adrian placed 9th in the competition. She was also a guest on the late night live talk show Aschberg Direkt. Adrian starred in an episode of SVT's live show Opinion Live, where she and Tina Meehrafzon discussed the flag ban and advertising brawl that was a hot topic before the Eurovision Song Contest in 2016. Right after this Adrian was asked to be one of three people to monitor the Eurovision Song Contest in 2016, she was broadcast live on Expressen TV throughout the evening.

== Personal life ==
In 2004, Isabel met her future husband, musician Steve Angello and one of the members of Swedish music group Swedish House Mafia. In 2013 they married. Adrian and Angello reside in Los Angeles and have two daughters.

In February 2019, Adrian was robbed at gunpoint by a number of masked robbers in central Stockholm as she was about to enter her car in a car garage. In the end, four men were found guilty of the offence and sentenced to prison.

== TV ==
Year	Title
2004	Expedition Robinson
2011	Svenska Hollywoodfruar season 3 & 4
2012	Svenska Hollywoodfruar season 5
2013	Fest hos Bagge Wahlgren
2014	Euros of Hollywood
2015	Svenska Hollywoodfruar season 9, Arga Snickaren VIP, Renées Brygga
2016	Realitystjärnorna på Godset, Let's Dance (Swedish TV series) Let's Dance, Aschberg Direkt, sv: SVT Opinion Live
