= Gunilla Persson =

Swedish fashion model and television personality

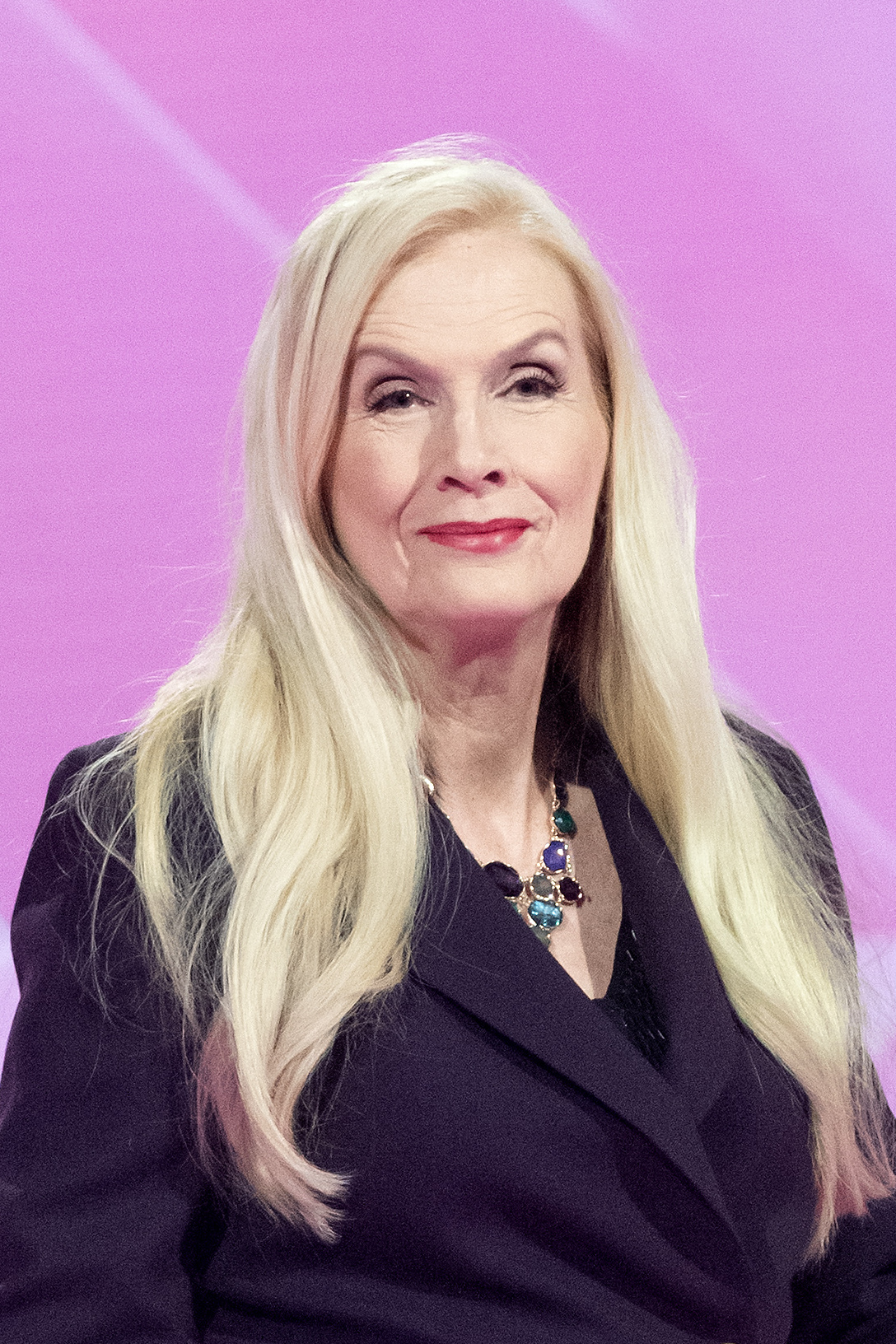
- Persson in 2024
- Born: Sonja Gunilla Persson; 31 December 1958 (age 67); Norrköping, Sweden
- Known for: Svenska Hollywoodfruar, Realitystjärnorna på godset
- Children: Erika Persson
- Parents: Nils Erik Persson (father); Iris Strid (mother)

Sonja Gunilla Persson (born 31 December 1958) is a Swedish former fashion model and current television personality and singer. She is the daughter of Nils Erik Persson (1920–1998) and Iris Strid (1926–2023).

== Career ==
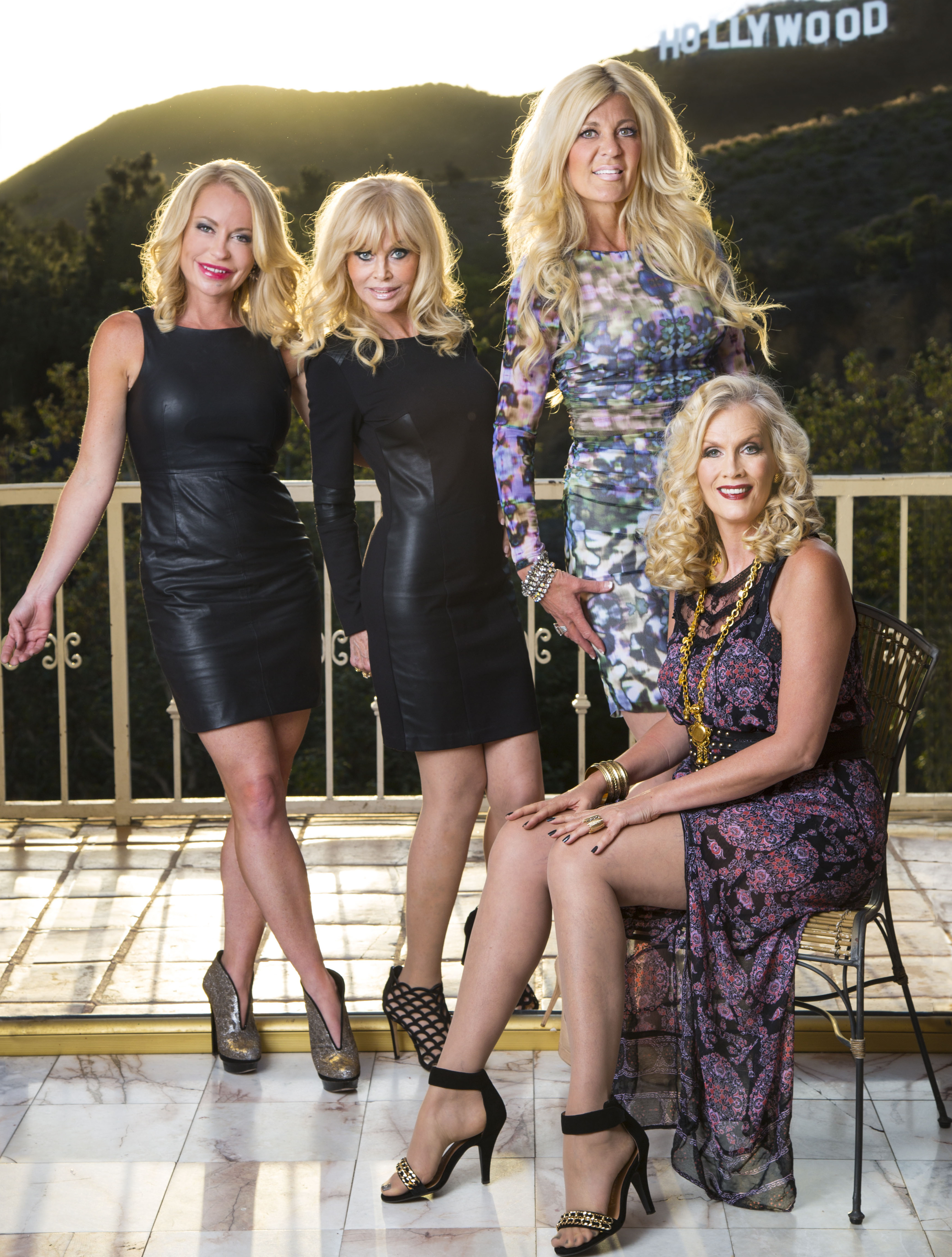
Persson (front) with Åsa Vesterlund, Britt Ekland and Maria Montazami in the Swedish reality TV series Svenska Hollywoodfruar in 2014

Persson worked as a tour leader and after journalistic studies started her career at Sveriges Radio where she worked as a presenter of a one-hour celebrity entertainment show conducting interviews with celebrities.

=== Modelling ===
Persson participated in 1983 Damernas Värld (Swedish women's magazine) modelling competition The Face of the 80's after her boyfriend submitted pictures of her without her knowledge. Eileen Ford, one of the judges of the competition, contacted her and signed her to her agency in New York City in 1983, even though Persson did not win the competition. She was also signed at and worked for Elite Model Management. She has appeared on the cover of a number of magazines including notably for the German edition of Bazaar, and has modelled lingerie for La Perla.

In the late 1970s, Persson moved from Sweden to Dallas, US, later moving to New York City where she lived for many years. She studied at Stella Adler's acting school. She moved to California to participate in Svenska Hollywoodfruar, and in early 2015 Persson was forced to leave her Manhattan, New York apartment by her landlord.

=== Television ===
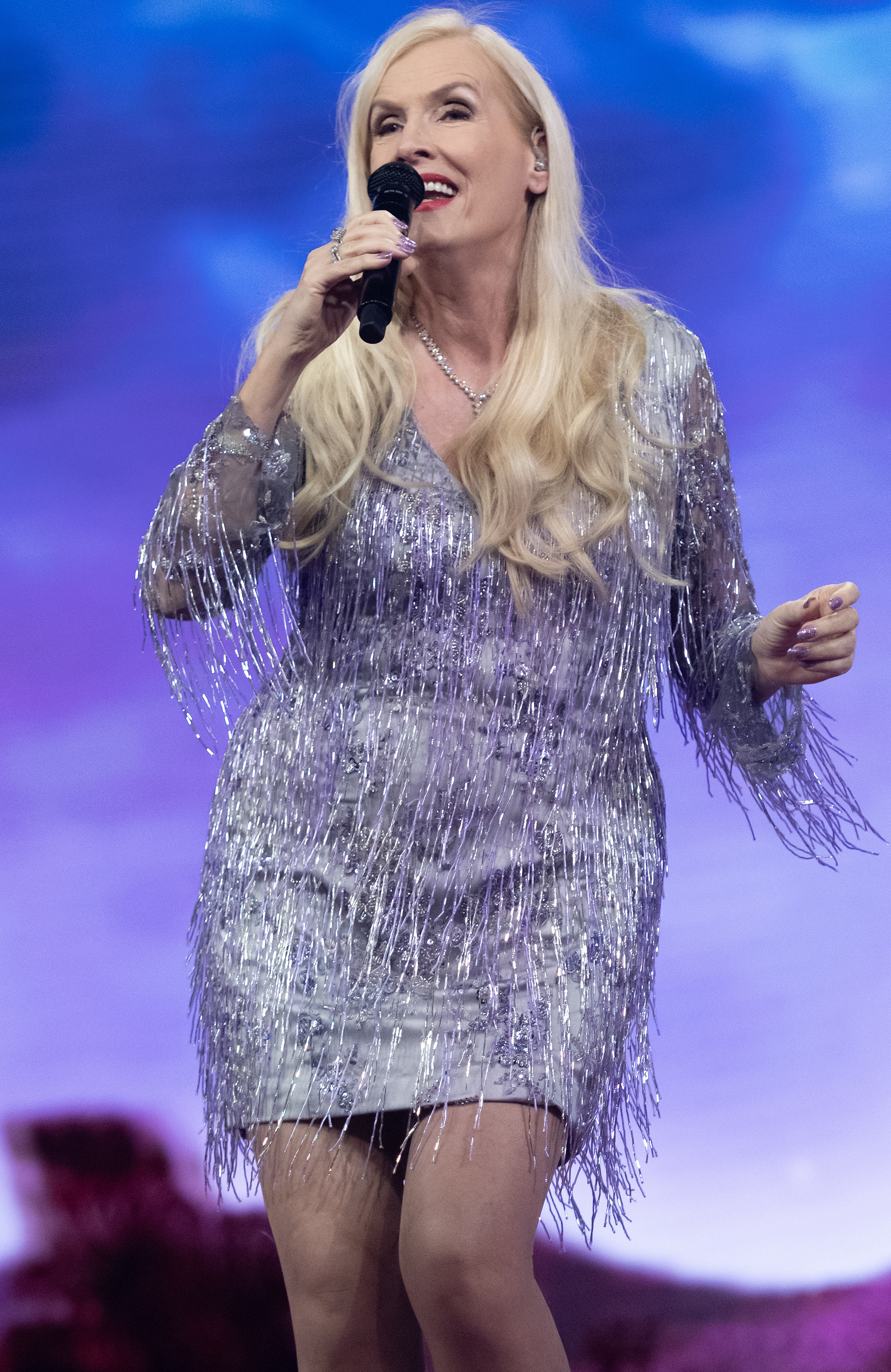
Persson during Melodifestivalen 2024

Persson appeared in a small role in the 1980s soap opera Dallas while living in Dallas.

Persson made her television debut in 2010 in the reality series Svenska New Yorkfruar (Swedish New York Wives): the series lasted one season and was broadcast on TV3. She has also participated in eight seasons of Svenska Hollywoodfruar (Swedish Hollywood-wives) as of 2017, also at TV3. Persson participated in the celebrity reality series Realitystjärnorna på godset (Reality Stars at the Manor) in 2014, and in 2015 got her own show called Gunilla tycker till (Gunilla states her opinion) where her fans got to vote on different jobs she had to try out. Persson also got a News show in 2017 called The Gunilla Show on viafree. In February 2013, Persson was a guest on The Schulman Show which is aired on Aftonbladet's website and presented by Alex Schulman. Persson recorded a music video with rapper Dogge Doggelito in 2015. In October 2015, Persson was a guest on the Norwegian talk show God kveld Norge!.

On 13 April 2017, Persson's home in Pacific Palisades that has appeared in Svenska Hollywoodfruar was badly damaged by fire. Persson's 91-year-old mother was injured during the incident.

In 2018, Persson participated in the celebrity version of Biggest Loser, broadcast on TV4.

She participated in Melodifestivalen 2024 with the song "I Won't Shake (La La Gunilla)". She came fourth in her heat on 17 February 2024, moving on to the run-off round where she was ultimately eliminated.

== Personal life ==
Gunilla Persson was married to Stephen Linville 1984–1990, whom she met at an acting class in Dallas. She lived in Francis Kellogg's apartment in New York in late 1980's, during which she also had a romance with Prince Albert of Monaco. Her boyfriend was hotel developer Patrick Ellis from 1990 until 1995.

She has a daughter whose name is Erika, who was born in August 2002.

On 22 May 2018, Persson was arrested by Palm Beach police on a felony grand-theft charge for stealing sunglasses. She was released the following morning after posting a $5,000 bond.

== Discography ==
=== Singles ===
List of singles, with selected peak chart positions
Title	Year	Peak chart positions	Album
Title	Year	SWE	Album
"I Won't Shake (La La Gunilla)"	2024	4	Non-album single
