= Natacha (given name) =

Natacha is a given name. It may refer to:

- Natacha Amal (born 1968), Belgian actress
- Natacha Atlas (born March 1964), Egyptian-Belgian singer
- Natacha Muziramakenga (born 1984), Rwandan poet, actor and curator
- Natacha Peyre, birth name of Swedish blogger, and singer Elena Belle
- Natacha Rambova (1897–1966), American costumer, set designer, occasional actress, published scholar of Egyptology and second wife of Rudolph Valentino
- Natacha Randriantefy (born 1978), Malagasy tennis player
- Natacha Régnier, Belgian actress
- Natacha Vautour, Canadian politician
- Natacha Voliakovsky, Argentine activist and performance artist
- Natacha Karam (born 1994), Saudi-born Irish and Lebanese actress
- Natacha Jaitt (1977–2019), Argentine model, actress, sex worker, screenwriter and radio and television host
- Natacha Lindinger (born 1970), French actress.
- Natacha Bouchart (born 1963), French politician of the Republicans (LR) and formerly Union for a Popular Movement (UMP).
- Nathacha Rigobert (born 1980), Mauritian beach volleyball player
- Natacha Valla (born 1976), French economist
- Natacha Michel (born 1941), French political activist and writer
- Natacha Gachnang (born 1987), Swiss race driver and the cousin of former Formula One driver Sébastien Buemi.
- Natacha Marro, French footwear designer

== See also ==
- Natasha
