= Bleona discography =

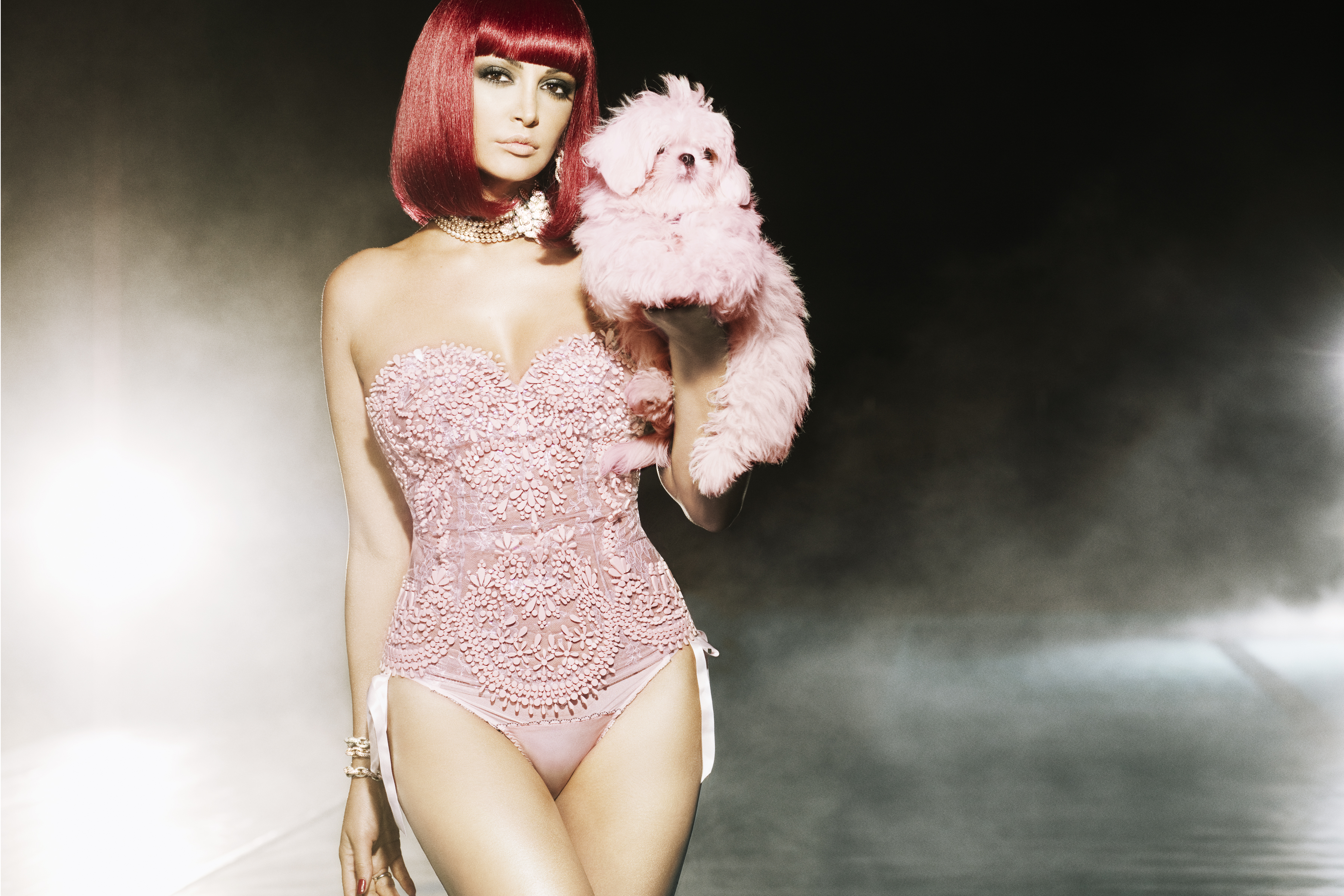
- Bleona, 2012
- Studio albums: 8
- Singles: 32

This article features the discography of Albanian-American singer and songwriter Bleona.

== Albums ==
=== Studio albums ===
- Kam Qejfin Tim (1997)
- Nese Me Do Fort (1999)
- S'me Behet Vone (2001)
- Ik Meso Si Dashurohet (2002)
- Ti Nuk Di As Me Ma Lyp (2003)
- Greatest Hits (2005)
- Boom Boom (2005)
- Mandarin (2007)

=== Extended plays ===
- Take It Like A Man (2013)
- Take You Over (2015)
- Wicked Love (2018)
- Monster (2018)
- I Don't Need Your Love (2018)

== Singles ==
=== As lead artist ===
Title	Year	Peak chart positions		Album
Title	Year	ALB	US	Album
"A ti besoj"	1994	—N/a	—	Non-album single
"Si të panjohur"	1995	—N/a	—	Non-album single
"Lermëni"	1995	—N/a	—	Non-album single
"Dhe prapë jam kthyer"	1996	—N/a	—	Non-album single
"Era"	1997	—N/a	—	Non-album single
"Nuk më mashtron dot"	1997	—N/a	—	Non-album single
"Nëse më do fort"	1999	—N/a	—	Non-album single
"S'më bëhet vonë"	2001	—N/a	—	Non-album single
"Telefon"	2001	—N/a	—	Non-album single
"Ik meso si dashurohët"	2002	—N/a	—	Non-album single
"Ti nuk di as me ma lyp"	2003	—N/a	—	Non-album single
"O bo bo c'i bëre vehtës"	2003	—N/a	—	Non-album single
"S'dua"	2005	—N/a	—	Non-album single
"Boom Boom"	2005	—N/a	—	Non-album single
"Hallal e ke"	2007	—N/a	—	Non-album single
"Mandarinë" (with Hekuran Krasniqi)	2007	—N/a	—	Non-album single
"Qejfin gruas mos ja prish"	2008	—N/a	—	Non-album single
"Magnetic"	2008	—N/a	—	Non-album single
"Show Off"	2010	—N/a	—	Non-album single
"Pass Out"	2012	—N/a	—	Non-album single
"Without You"	2013	—N/a	—	Non-album single
"Take It Like A Man"	2013	—N/a	— (Note: "Take It Like A Man" peaked at number 31 on the Dance Club Songs chart.)	Non-album single
"Fuck You I'm Famous"	2014	—N/a	—	Non-album single
"Still In Love"	2014	—N/a	—	Non-album single
"Take You Over"	2015	—N/a	— (Note: "Take You Over" peaked at number 28 on the Dance/Electronic Songs and number 3 on the Dance Club Songschart.)	Non-album single
"Wicked Love"	2018	—	— (Note: "Wicked Love" peaked at number 12 on the Dance Club Songs chart.)	Non-album single
"I Don't Need Your Love"	2018	—	— (Note: "I Don't Need Your Love" peaked at number 1 on the Dance Club Songs chart.)	Non-album single
"Monster"	2018	—	— (Note: "Monster" peaked at number 12 on the Dance Club Songs chart.)	Non-album single
"Su Di Noi"	2019	—	—	Non-album single
"#Haters" (featuring Bes Kallaku)	2020	73	—	Non-album single
"Xhamadani [Live]"	2024	—	—	
"Stani"	2024	—	—	

== Billboard Dance Chart Success ==
=== Weekly charts ===
I Don't Need Your Love (2019)	Peak position
US Dance Club Songs (Billboard)	1

Wicked Love (2018)	Peak position
US Dance Club Songs (Billboard)	12

Monster (2018)	Peak position
US Dance Club Songs (Billboard)	12

Take you over (2015)	Peak position
US Dance Club Songs (Billboard)	3
US Hot Dance/Electronic Songs (Billboard)	28
