= It's All About You (Fawni song) =

2012 song by Fawni

"It's All About You" is a song by Austrian singer-songwriter, artist and actress Fawni. It was released on November 21, 2012. The song was written and produced by Johannes Bürmann, Alexander Gernert, Dan Priddy and Alfred Tuohey. "It's All About You" has since peaked at number one on the iTunes charts in Japan.

== Track listing ==
It's All About You - Single
No.	Title	Writer(s)	Producer(s)	Length
1.	"It's All About You (Radio Edit)"	Johannes Bürmann; Alfred Tuohey; Alexander Gernert; Dan Priddy	Johannes Bürmann; Alfred Tuohey	3:38
2.	"It's All About You (Extended Mix)"	Johannes Bürmann; Alfred Tuohey; Alexander Gernert; Dan Priddy	Johannes Bürmann; Alfred Tuohey	4:59

== Remixes ==
On March 5, 2013 Street Beat Records released a remix compilation of "It's All About You".

- 1. Original Radio Edit 3:38
- 2. Original Extended 4:59
- 3. Mike Rizzo Remix Radio Edit 3:47
- 4. Mike Rizzo Remix 6:56
- 5. Dominatorz Remix Radio Edit 3:38
- 6. Dominatorz Remix 5:21
- 7. Sjors vam Dimms Remix Radio Edit 3:50
- 8. Sjors vam Dimms Remix 5:46
- 9. Al Patrone Remix Radio Edit 3:36
- 10. Al Patrone Remix 4:14
- 11. RKRDR Dubstep Remix Radio Edit 3:26
- 12. RKRDR Dubstep Remix 5:25

== Credits and personnel ==
Credits adapted from Juno Records.

- Fawni - Primary artist
- Johannes Bürmann - Producer
- Alfred Tuohey - Producer
- Rene Van Verseveld - Vocal Engineer, Mixing
- Koen Heldens - Mixing
- Jessica Jean - Backing Vocals
- Duncan Stanbury - Mastering Engineer
- Gil Corber - Executive Producer
- Michael Hernandez - Executive Producer

== Charts ==
Chart	Peak position
UK Commercial Pop Top 30	9
UK Cool Cuts Top 20	18
Swiss Dance Top 100	23
Australia Airplay Top 10	9
