= Maria Montazami =

Swedish housewife and television personality

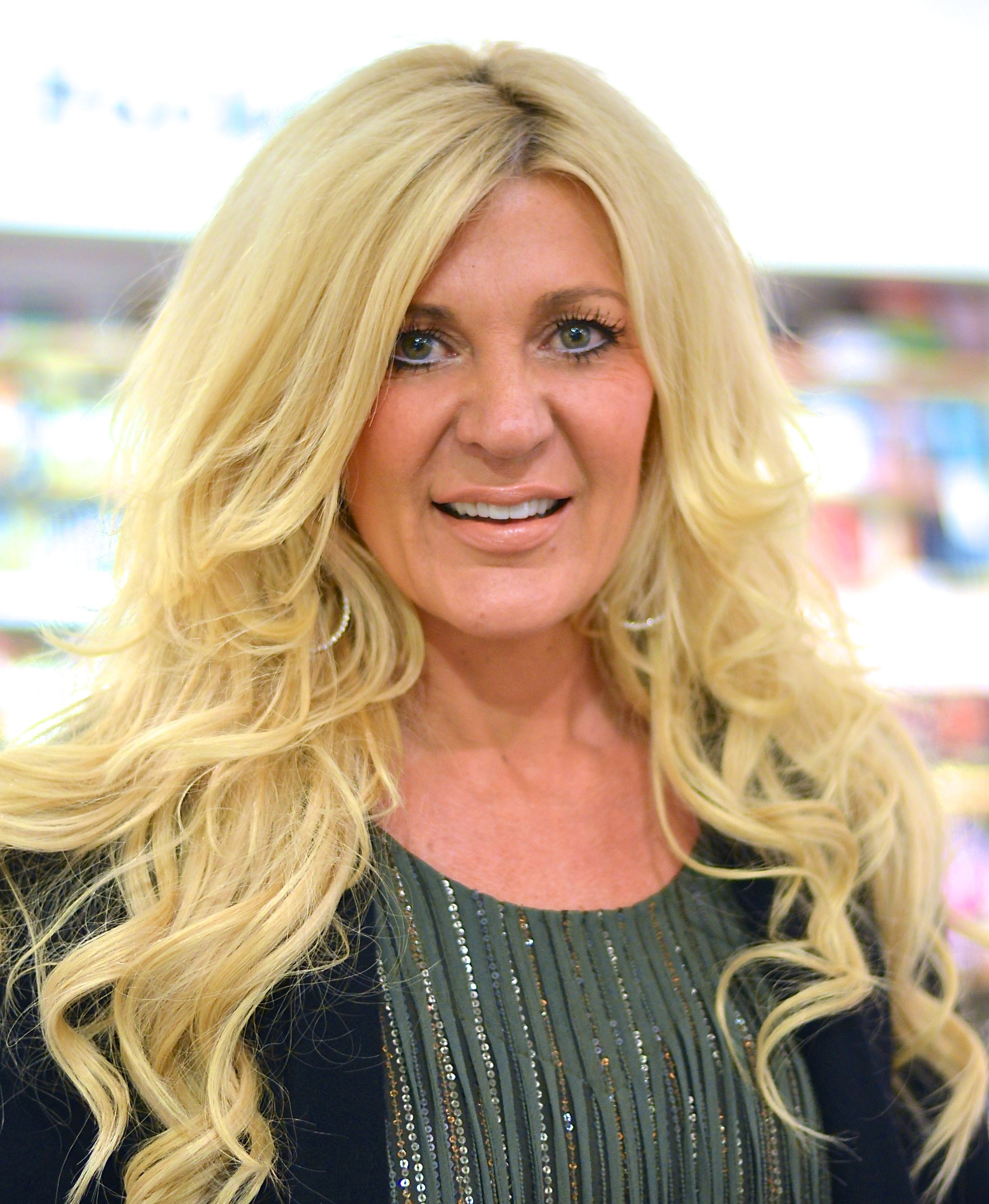
- Maria Montazami (2013)
- Born: Maria Brigitte Anita Westphal; 13 November 1965 (age 60); Västerås, Sweden
- Occupation: Television personality
- Years active: 2009–present
- Known for: Svenska Hollywoodfruar
- Height: 5 ft 11 in (180 cm)
- Spouse: Kamran Montazami
- Children: Sara Montazami (born 1990); Hanna Montazami (born 1993); Emma Montazami; Nicholas Montazami
- Website: http://www.mariamontazami.nu/

Maria Brigitte Anita Montazami (née Westphal; born 13 November 1965) is a Swedish–American housewife and television personality in the series Svenska Hollywoodfruar. Montazami has also appeared in commercials for Max Hamburgers and the travel agency Vings commercial. In November 2010 Montazami appeared in the TV3 show 24 timmar, alongside singer Anna Book.

== Biography ==
Montazami was born in Västerås. In 1965, she travelled to Los Angeles, United States, to visit her sister. She stayed in Los Angeles and worked as an au pair and later as a waitress at a restaurant. She met the restaurant owner Kamran Montazami, an American originally from Iran. Maria and Kamran married in 1990.

Within the next few years, Kamran Montazami became a successful real-estate agent and the couple moved to Laguna Niguel, California where they raised four children. Since the mid-1990s, Maria Montazami has been a housewife.

== Fame in Sweden ==
In September 2009 Montazami along with Paul Anka's wife Anna Anka and actress Agnes-Nicole Winter were all cast for a new Swedish television show that was to follow three Swedish women who live in Hollywood. The show Svenska Hollywoodfruar became a huge hit and the most viewed television show in TV3's history with more than one million people tuning in each week to watch. Montazami was the only of the three original Hollywood wives that signed for season two of the show. Montazami also appeared in season three, four and five of the Hollywood wives.

At the QX Gaygala in 2010 in Stockholm Montazami was a presenter for the category "Årets bok". She also won the category Årets: vi älskar dig.

Maria Montazami was featured in a commercial for the Swedish fast food company Max Hamburgers in 2010.

In November 2010, Maria Montazami appeared in the TV3 show 24 timmar (24 hours) along with singer Anna Book.

In January 2011, Monatazami appeared in a television commercial for the travel agency Ving in Sweden.

February 5, 2013, was the premiere of Monatazami's new spin-off TV show, Maria & Mindy - Best Friends Forever on TV3. Mindy Bondurant was Maria's best friend and neighbour. In the show we follow the two friends as they journey through Sweden. Much has changed since Maria moved from Sweden in 1987. She and Mindy rediscover Sweden and it becomes an adventure filled with new experiences, encounters, humour and colliding cultures. The première on TV3 attracted around 382,000 viewers. After the show Maria and Mindy parted ways and are no longer friends.

Montazami was a contestant on Let's Dance 2013. And in late 2013 she had her own show Montazamis med vänner (Montazamis with friends) on TV3 a show where Maria and her family meet and hang out with Swedish celebrities.

== TV ==
- 2009- - Svenska Hollywoodfruar
- 2010 - 24 timmar
- 2010 - Max Hamburgers commercial
- 2011 - Ving travel agency commercial
- 2013 - Maria & Mindy – Best Friends Forever
- 2013 - Let's Dance
- 2013 - Montazamis med vänner

== Bibliography ==
- 2011 - Välkommen hem till Maria Montazami
- 2013 - Fira med Maria Montazami
