= Margareta Svensson =

Musical artist, Vocal coach

Margareta Svensson Riggs
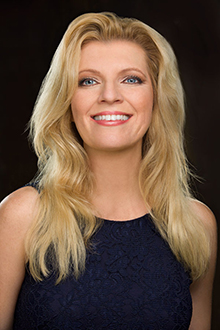
- Svensson Riggs in Los Angeles, September 2015
- Born: Ulla Margareta Elisabeth Svensson; 22 April 1968 (age 58); Varberg, Sweden
- Occupations: Singer, pianist, songwriter, actress, voice teacher, vocal coach, television personality
- Years active: 1986–present
- Partner: Seth Riggs (m. 2012)
- Children: 1

Margareta Svensson Riggs (born Ulla Margareta Elisabeth Svensson; 22 April 1968) is a Swedish singer, pianist, songwriter, actress, voice teacher, vocal coach and television personality.

== Early life ==
Already as a five-year-old, Svensson performed her first public performance at a Red Cross Christmas party, and soon thereafter she went with her mother, Inga-Lill Svensson, a registered nurse, to sing for the sick and elderly at the local hospital. With an extensive after-school music program and busy performing schedule, Svensson went on to study dance at Harvard University, and acting at Calle Flygare Teaterskola, Stockholm, Sweden, acting, musical theater, and film and television at Tisch School of the Arts, NYU.

== Career ==
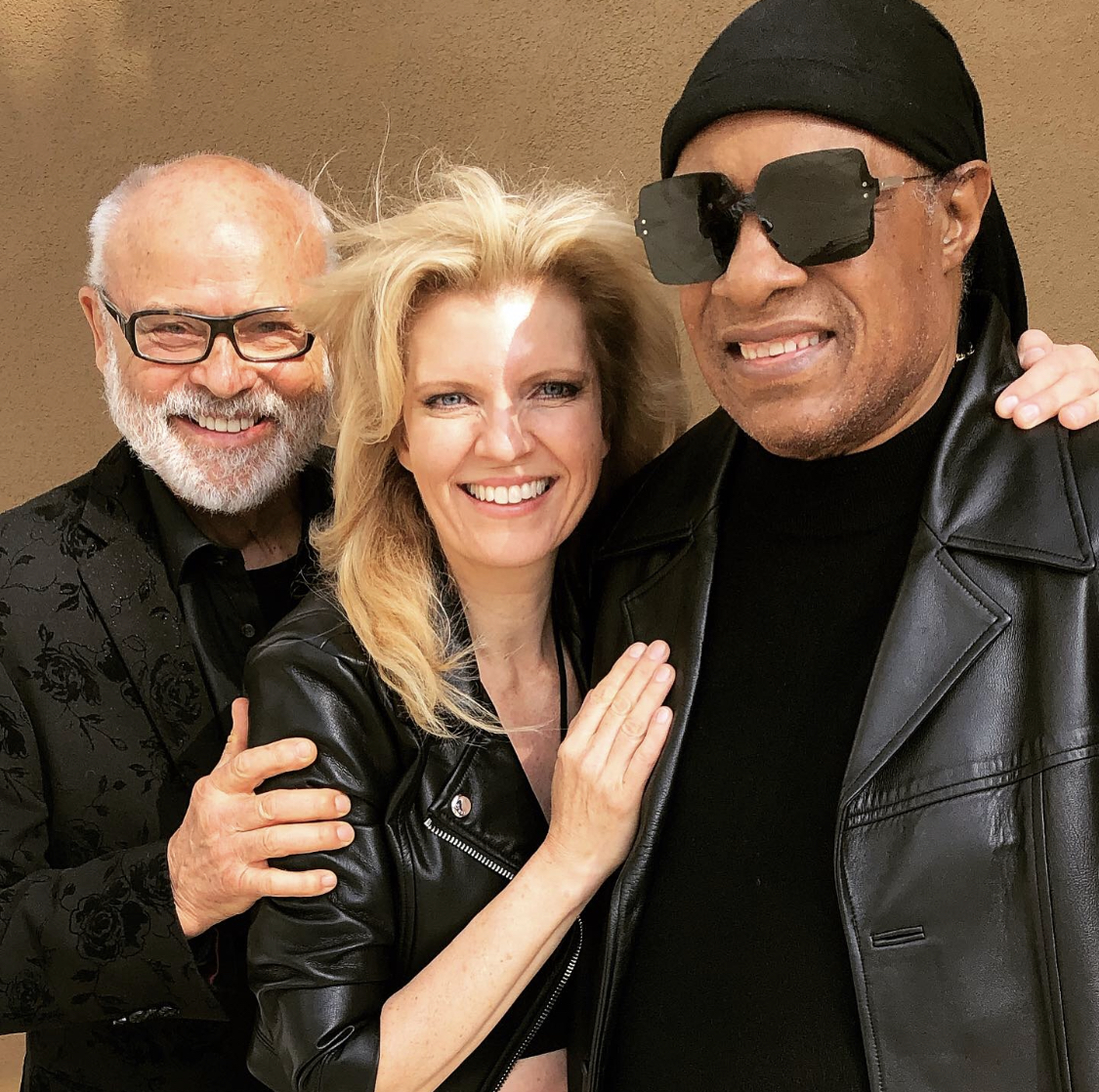
Riggs, Svensson and Stevie Wonder (June 2019)

At 18, Svensson boarded Portuguese cruise ship MS Funchal as a singer-pianist and a headliner, and from there on she performed throughout Sweden and Europe. While playing Gothia Towers in Gothenburg, Frank Sinatra was performing next-door at Scandinavium. After the concert the Sinatra band came to see Svensson. Sinatra-drummer, Gregg Field, liked Svensson's original music and invited her to come to Los Angeles to record.

As a singer-pianist Margareta Svensson has opened five casino resorts in Las Vegas. National, daily, Swedish newspaper Expressen wrote "Jackpot in Las Vegas". In 1999, Svensson opened Mandalay Bay alongside Bob Dylan and Luciano Pavarotti, The Venetian Las Vegas where she had her own act at La Scena, The Resort at Summerlin (now known as JW Marriott Las Vegas Resort and Spa,) in the year 2000 The Aladdin (now known as Planet Hollywood Resort & Casino) and in 2005 Steve Wynn recruited her to open Wynn Las Vegas. She has held engagements at numerous other Las Vegas casinos and resorts, including MGM Grand Las Vegas, Bellagio, The Mirage, Treasure Island Hotel and Casino, Monte Carlo Resort and Casino, Bally's Las Vegas and Encore Las Vegas.

Svensson has also performed and held resident engagements at among other places The Grand Hotel Stockholm, Sweden, The Dorchester, London, UK, The Beverly Hills Hotel Polo Lounge, The Beverly Wilshire Hotel, and Montage Beverly Hills where she was responsible for all music, and she has traveled the world both as a headliner as well as a piano-singer, and performed for many superstars, including Sir Paul McCartney, Whoopi Goldberg, Stevie Wonder, Chevy Chase, Michael Bolton, B. B. King, Sir Tom Jones and Kiss and world leaders like Margaret Thatcher, to name a few.

She continues to write, record and perform her original music.

=== Svenska Hollywoodfruar ===
Her extensive career as a singer-pianist and performer, led to a lead on the fifth season of Svenska Hollywoodfruar broadcast on TV3 Sweden. Season 5 had the highest ratings of the 13 seasons and season 5 is claimed to have saved the network at the time. Svenska Hollywoodfruar features Svensson both as a singer, pianist, performer, songwriter and recording artist, as well as a vocal coach.

=== The World's Best ===
In 2019, Svensson Riggs was one of the 50 international expert judges on the new global talent competition series The World's Best from reality TV heavyweights Mark Burnett and Mike Darnell, on CBS. Headlining was James Corden as host, and Drew Barrymore, RuPaul and Faith Hill as American judges. "The Wall of the World" panel consisted of noteworthy names from all realms of entertainment. She is the first Swede to be featured as a judge on an American reality talent show.

== Teaching and workshops ==
Riggs and Svensson teaching in China, September 2013

Margareta Svensson Riggs is an expert in vocal technique, known for defining singing as "the energizing, managing, shaping and directing of air." She is the voice teacher to legendary singers such as Stevie Wonder, Michael Bolton, Brian Wilson, and M.Shadows, among others. She works with her husband, Seth Riggs, who originally trained her as a singer and a teacher. Once teaching together, they developed the Svensson Riggs vocal technique and perfected their methods for effective and healthy singing to better benefit their clients. They conduct vocal workshops and master classes around the world.

== Personal life ==
Svensson Riggs is married to American vocal coach Seth Riggs, who is known for clients such as Michael Jackson, Barbra Streisand, Stevie Wonder, Madonna, Ray Charles, Earth, Wind & Fire, and Natalie Cole. The two met when Margareta Svensson came to Seth Riggs for singing lessons in the mid-1990s. In 2008, they became a couple and in 2012, they married and their daughter Samantha was born.

In 2013 Svensson read about Angelina Jolie having tested positive for BRCA1, a gene mutation that drastically increases the risk of ovarian- and breast cancer, and Jolie's mother having died from ovarian cancer. Svensson's own mother, Inga-Lill Svensson, had also died from ovarian cancer, and Svensson asked to be tested for BRCA. Svensson tested positive for BRCA1 and while waiting for preventive surgery, an MRI revealed early stage breast cancer. Well and healthy, she shared her story in 2015 in hopes to pass on the gift of helping to yet others at risk.
