= University of the Arts Helsinki =

Arts university in Helsinki, Finland

Coordinates: 60.1741°N 24.9346°E

The University of the Arts Helsinki (Uniarts Helsinki)
- Taideyliopisto; Konstuniversitetet
- Type: Public
- Established: 2013
- Rector: Kaarlo Hildén
- Administrative staff: 731 (2019)
- Students: 1,946 (2019)
- Postgraduates: 205 (2016)
- Location: Helsinki, Kuopio, Seinäjoki, Finland
- Website: www.uniarts.fi

The University of the Arts Helsinki (Finnish: Taideyliopisto, Swedish: Konstuniversitetet), also known as Uniarts Helsinki, is a Finnish arts university that was launched in the beginning of 2013. Apart from a few exceptions, it is the only university in Finland that provides education in the fields it represents.

The University of the Arts Helsinki is located mainly in Helsinki, but it also has operations in Kuopio (department of church music) and Seinäjoki at the University Consortium of Seinäjoki (department of popular and folk music).

The university comprises three academies that were formerly independent universities: The Academy of Fine Arts of the University of the Arts Helsinki (until 2013 Finnish Academy of Fine Arts), the Sibelius Academy of the University of the Arts Helsinki (until 2013 Sibelius Academy) and the Theatre Academy of the University of the Arts Helsinki (until 2013 Helsinki Theatre Academy). The total number of students is 1946 (as of 2019).

According to the university, the goal of the merger is to strengthen the education, research and artistic activity within the field of arts in the university sector on a national and international scale. Another objective is to provide more opportunities to influence society through art.

The rector of the University of the Arts Helsinki is Kaarlo Hildén. Lauri Väkevä and Jaana Erkkilä-Hill are the vice-rectors and Heikki Lehtonen is the chair of the university board.

== Admissions ==
The University of the Arts Helsinki offers over 30 degree programmes in the fields of music, fine arts, theatre and dance. The programmes lead to a Bachelor's, Master's or doctoral degree.

== Education and research ==
The university provides the highest level of education in the arts in Finland, also engaging in artistic activities and research. In addition to bachelor's, master's and doctoral studies, the university offers open and continuing education services. University of the Arts Helsinki's Sibelius Academy also offers junior academy studies.

=== Degrees ===
At the University of the Arts Helsinki, students can complete Bachelor's, Master's and doctoral degrees in the fields of fine arts, music, theatre and dance.

== Degree programmes ==
=== Academy of Fine Arts of the University of the Arts Helsinki (fine arts) ===
- Study Programme in Printmaking
- Study Programme in Painting
- Study Programme in Sculpture
- Study Programme in Time and Space Arts (moving image, site and situation specific art, photography)
- Praxis Master's Programme
- Doctoral Programme

=== Sibelius Academy of the University of the Arts Helsinki (music) ===
- Arts Management
- Church Music
- Classical Music Performance, accordion
- Classical Music Performance, early music
- Classical Music Performance, forte piano
- Classical Music Performance, guitar
- Classical Music Performance, kantele
- Classical Music Performance, orchestral instruments
- Classical Music Performance, organ
- Classical Music Performance, piano
- Classical Music Performance, piano chamber music and lied
- Classical Music Performance, vocal music and collaborative piano
- Composition and Music Theory
- Conducting
- Folk Music
- Global music
- Jazz
- Music Education
- Music Technology
- Nordic Master in Folk Music
- Nordic Master in Jazz
- Popular and Folk Music (research)

=== Theatre Academy of the University of the Arts Helsinki (dance, theatre) ===
- Degree Programme in Acting (in Finnish)
- Degree Programme in Acting (in Swedish)
- Degree Programme in Dance
- Degree Programme in Directing
- Degree Programme in Dramaturgy
- Master's Degree Programme in Choreography
- Master's Degree Programme in Dance Pedagogy
- Master's Degree Programme in Dance Performance
- Master's Degree Programme in Lighting Design
- Master's Degree Programme in Sound
- Master's Degree Programme in Theatre Pedagogy
- Master's Degree Programme in Live Art and Performance Studies (LAPS)

== Notable staff ==
=== Academy of Fine Arts ===
- Tuulikki Pietilä (teacher of printmaking, Art Academy School 1956–1960, now the Academy of Fine Arts)
- Helene Schjerfbeck (teacher of a painting atelier and a figure drawing class at the Finnish Art Society's Drawing School 1892-1902)

=== Sibelius Academy ===
- Martti Rousi (Professor of Cello Music 1998)
- Erik T. Tawaststjerna (Professor of Piano Music 1986-)
- Petteri Salomaa (Professor of Vocal Music 2003-)
- Réka Szilvay (Professor of Violin Music 2006-)
- Leif Segerstam (Professor of Orchestral Conducting 1997-2013)
- Einojuhani Rautavaara (Professor of Composition 1976-1990)
- Veli-Matti Puumala (Professor of Composition 2005-)
- Jorma Panula (Professor of Conducting 1973–1993)
- Erkki Melartin (director of the Helsinki Music Institute 1911–1936, now the Sibelius Academy)
- Hannu Lintu (Visiting Professor, Conducting and Orchestral Training 2014-)
- Paavo Heininen (Professor of Composition)
- Andrew Bentley (Artistic Professor of Music Technology 2015-)
- Atso Almila (Professor of Conducting and Orchestral Training 2013-)

=== Theatre Academy ===
- Kari Väänänen (Professor of Acting 1.11.1992–28.2.1998)
- Vesa Vierikko (Professor of Acting 2002–2012)
- Ritva Valkama (Professor of Acting 1.8.1985–31.8.1988)
- Jouko Turkka (Professor of Acting 1983–1985)
- Pirkko Saisio (Professor of Dramaturgy 1.1.1997–30.6.2002)
- Laura Ruohonen (Professor of Dramaturgy 1.6.2008–31.5.2013)
- Kati Outinen (Professor of Acting 2002–2013)
- Kaisa Korhonen (Professor of Directing 1.8.1995–31.7.2000)
- Elina Knihtilä (Professor of Acting 2013-2018)
- Hannu-Pekka Björkman (Professor of Acting 2013-2018)

== Student Union ==
The University of the Arts Student Union is a student organisation that provides services and promotes the interest of its members. All Bachelor's and Master's students studying at any of the three academies of the University of the Arts Helsinki are members of the University of the Arts Student Union. The Student Union was established on 1 January 2013 as a result of the merger between the student unions of the Academy of Fine Arts, Sibelius Academy and Theatre Academy. The University of the Arts Student Union is the only Finnish student union whose members exclusively consist of students studying in the field of arts.

In addition to promoting the interest of its members, the University of the Arts Student Union is in charge of Vapaan taiteen tila, a space for the university's students to organise their own exhibitions, performances and events. The venue is in an emergency shelter under the Katri Vala Park in Helsinki.

== Organisation ==
=== Rectors ===
- Tiina Rosenberg 2013–1.6.2015
- Paula Tuovinen 2.6.2015–30.11.2015
- Jari Perkiömäki 1.12.2015–30.11.2020
- Kaarlo Hildén 1.12.2020–

=== Board 2018-2021 ===
- Researcher of economic culture Paavo Järvensivu
- Board professional and executive Heikki Lehtonen (chair of the board)
- Professor Marja Makarow
- Director of the Cultural Office of the City of Helsinki Stuba Nikula
- LL.M. with court training Astrid Thors (vice-chair)
- Professor Eeva Anttila
- Professor Petteri Salomaa
- Facilities expert Kari Karlsson
- Senior Advisor Hannu Tolvanen
- Student Lukas Korpelainen
- Student Sofia Raittinen
