= Caroline Farberger =

Swedish business executive (born 1967)

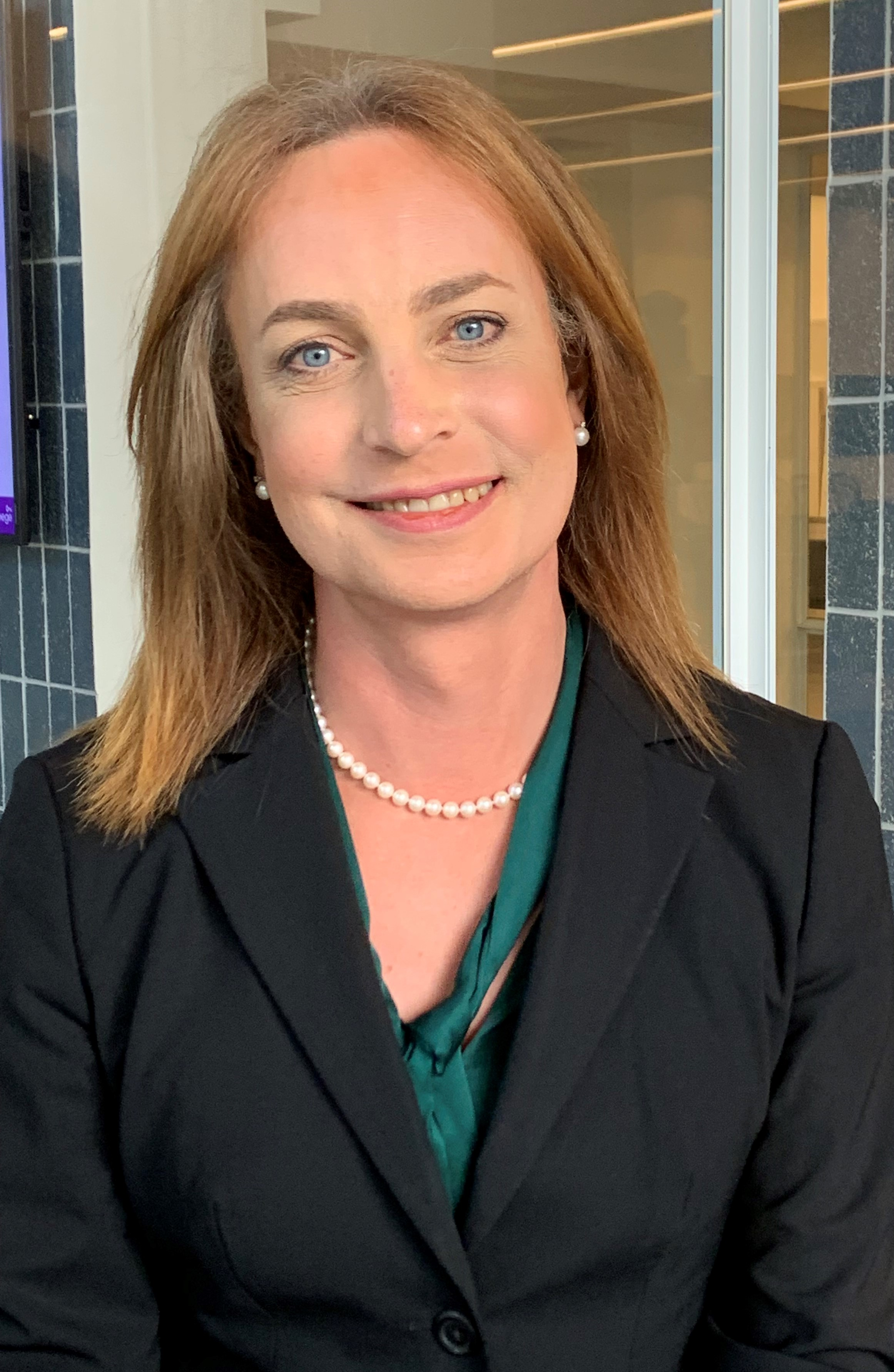
- Farberger in September 2019

Caroline Farberger (born 1967) is a Swedish business executive, and a chairwoman, board advisor and board member on several boards. She was the CEO of the Swedish company ICA Insurance, part of the ICA Group, from 2016 to 2022. Formerly having lived as a man, Farberger is known for being the first Swedish top CEO coming out as transgender. She came out at the age of 49.

Farberger grew up in Uddevalla and Lerum. She completed military service as a company commander at the Älvsborg Regiment (I15). After completing degrees in business administration at Gothenburg School of Business, Economics and Law and electrical engineering at Chalmers University of Technology, Farberger worked as a management consultant with McKinsey for six years. During the dot-com bubble she founded InsMark, a finance company, before moving on to work in the insurance industry. Farberger held various management positions at Trygg-Hansa before taking the helm as CEO of ICA Insurance in May 2016. A year later she began the process of seeking gender-affirming care, eventually coming out as trans in 2018. In 2019 she won "LGBTQ person of the year" at Gaygalan Awards. In 2020, her autobiography Jag, Caroline was published. The book was nominated for Book of the Year by QX magazine. After quitting her job as CEO at ICA insurance in 2022 she moved on to become a venture capitalist and board professional. She is a chair person, board member and advisor on several boards.

== Personal life ==
Farberger has three children.
