= Caroline Grane =

Swedish realtor (born 1978)

- Born: 19 April 1978 (age 47); Stockholm, Sweden
- Occupation: realtor
- Known for: participate in the eighth season of Svenska Hollywoodfruar

Ulla Johanna Caroline Grane (born 19 April 1978) is a Swedish realtor who works in New York City, United States. She has also participated in the Swedish reality series Svenska Hollywoodfruar on TV3.

== Biography ==
Grane was born in Stockholm. She grew up in[Stockholm and in the mid-2000s moved to New York to start her career as a realtor, she has an MBA in finance. She is employed at the real estate agency Nest Seekers. Grane is a childhood friend of Fredrik Eklund and she has also appeared on the Bravo show Million Dollar Listing New York as a friend of Eklund.

Grane agreed to participate in the eighth season of Svenska Hollywoodfruar in 2015 after actress Britt Ekland had decided to drop out.
