= Svenska Hollywoodfruar =

Swedish reality television program

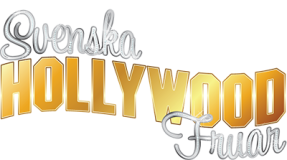
- Genre: Reality television
- Starring: Former Wives Maria Montazami (season 1 – season 13); Gunilla Persson (season 4 – season 13); Elena Belle (season 10 - 13); Anna Anka (season 1, 12); Agnes-Nicole Winter (season 1, 3–4, 6, 8); Suzanne Saperstein (season 2); Lena Jolton (seasons 2 - season 3); Päivi Hacker (season 2 - season 3); Isabel Adrian (season 3–5, 9, 11); Margareta Svensson (season 5); Siv Cotton (season 6, 13); Britt Ekland (season 6 – 7); Caroline Grane (season 8); Åsa Vesterlund (season 7–10, 13); Sofie Prydz (season 10, 12); Jennifer Åkerman (season 11)
- Narrated by: Maria Franceschi
- Country of origin: Sweden
- Original languages: Swedish; English
- No. of seasons: 13

Production
- Production location: Los Angeles
- Running time: 45 minutes
- Production companies: Meter Film & Television

Original release
- Network: TV3
- Release: 2009 – 2019

Related
- The Gunilla Show

Svenska Hollywoodfruar (English: Swedish Hollywood Wives) was a Swedish reality TV series from 2009 to 2019 that followed Swedish women in Hollywood and their glamorous lives. The first episode aired on TV3 on 14 September 2009, and became a hit with over 600,000 viewers. In March 2020, TV3 announced that the thirteenth season would be the last.

== Concept and production ==
Svenska Hollywoodfruar is a Swedish documentary series consisting of five parts that aired in the autumn of 2009 on TV3. The series follows the life of three Swedish women living a wealthy, glamorous Hollywood lifestyle in Los Angeles, California (USA). The wives, Anna Anka, Maria Montazami, and Agnes-Nicole Winter, have all married rich American men and are now living a life of luxury. International adaptations of the format have also aired in Denmark, Norway, Spain, Belgium, Poland, and Holland, among other territories. The concept of the series is based on the American reality shows The Real Housewives of..., such as The Real Housewives of Orange County, New York City, Atlanta, and New Jersey. Anders Knave, program director at TV3, commented: "The Real Housewives shows are very popular and we wanted to take it a step further. We have therefore looked for Swedish women in Hollywood, who have married rich men and live what one would call the ideal picture of a life in luxury." Knave also commented that the wives do not get any assignments by the producers and the series only follows their regular life; "It's a sneak peek into the lusciousness of luxury", Knave said.

== Some of the former wives ==
=== Maria Montazami ===
(Season 1 – 13)

Maria Montazami was born and raised in Västerås, Västmanland County. In 1987, she travelled to Los Angeles, California, to meet her sister, a foreign exchange student. While staying in Los Angeles and working as a waitress, Montazami met restaurant owner Kamran Montazami, to whom she soon got married. A few years later, Kamran Montazami became a successful and wealthy real estate broker, and the couple moved to Laguna Niguel, California, where they have raised four children. Montazami is currently a housewife. She commented on her role in the series: "I hope people will see that I'm a happy and fun person [...] and that we are a family that works really hard."

=== Gunilla Persson ===
(Season 4 – 13)

Gunilla Persson was born in Norrköping in 1958 and since 1989 resides in Manhattan, New York. She has a daughter named Erika who was born in 2002. She has previously worked as a tour guide and model and celebrity portraits done for Sveriges Radio.

=== Elena Belle ===
- Elena Belle

(season 10 - 13)

Elena Belle is a model, reality star and entrepreneur that was born in Ibiza.

=== Anna Anka ===
(Season 1, 12)

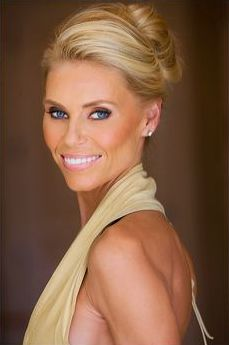
Anna Anka, one of the wives featured in the TV show.

Anna Åberg was born in Poland but was adopted into a Swedish family in Bjuv, Skåne, at the age of three. She moved to the United States in 1994 to begin a modelling career, and six years later, she was hired as the personal trainer of pop musician Paul Anka. Åberg and Anka soon started a relationship and got married in 2008, when Åberg changed her surname to Anka. They were living in Westlake Village, California, with their children Ethan and Elli. Anna Anka was then a housewife, which she described as a "full-time job". In the first episode of Svenska Hollywoodfruar, Anka followed her husband to one of his concerts across the U.S.

=== Agnes-Nicole Winter ===
(Season 1, 3–4, 8)

Agnes-Nicole Winter is a Swedish actress and writer from Borås, Västra Götaland County. She moved to the United States at the end of the 1980s to work as a model. She is currently divorced, and living with her two sons, Cristofer and Alexander, in Beverly Hills and works as an actress and a film producer and owns her own film production company, Global Star Films. After getting a divorce from her previous husband, Winter can be seen in the series visiting a dating agency called Millionaires Club, in hopes of maybe starting a new relationship with a new man. In the first episode of Svenska Hollywoodfruar, Winter spends time at a shooting range with her sons, after having experienced a robbery in her home. In a subsequent episode, she looked to distribute her upcoming feature film The Gold & The Beautiful and visited the office of a Hollywood film producer and distributor.

=== Suzanne Saperstein ===
(Season 2)
Suzanne Saperstein born in 1961 in Avesta moved to the U.S. at a young age and met during a flight David Saperstein. The couple married and had children but divorced in 2005 after David had fallen in love with the couple's Swedish nanny model Hillevi Svensson and decided to leave Suzanne. Their divorce went to court a lot of attention in both Swedish and foreign media and ended with Suzanne received an undisclosed amount of money of the couple's fortune said to be worth about 100 million according to TV3 sources in Swedish Hollywood Wives. Suzanne owns one of the world's most expensive houses in the exclusive Holmby Hills and she also has one of the largest collections of Haute Couture clothing.

=== Lena Jolton ===
(Season 2–3)
Lena Jolton was born in 1956 in Halmstad, and in her teens moved to Paris to study French. Later she moved to the United States. She was previously married to a millionaire and has a daughter named Cassandra from that marriage. She has also worked as a model. Lena is friends with the other Hollywood wife Päivi Hacker and is acquaintances with Suzanne Saperstein. She plays a flight attendant in Sällskapsresan.

=== Päivi Hacker ===
(Season 2–3)
Päivi Hacker was born in Finland in 1958 but grew up in Västerås and moved to the U.S. when she was 24 years old. Päivi Hacker has also studied art and literature at Stockholm University. She was married to Joseph L Alperson, of Beverly Hills, Ca. who died 7 June 1992. She remained a widow until 2005 when she met Barry Hacker. She is married to Barry, 44, who is a businessman. The couple has no children.

=== Isabel Adrian ===
(Season 3–5)
Isabel Adrian, born 1977 in Gothenburg, is a Swedish artist, designer, reality show participant and blogger. 2004 she participated in Swedish Expedition Robinson. She is engaged to Steve Angello and together they have two daughters, Monday-Lily (born 2010) and Winter Rose (born 2012). Living in Los Angeles since 2009. Adrian has also worked as a model.

=== Margareta Svensson ===
(Season 5)

Margareta Svensson, born in 1968, is a Swedish singer, pianist, songwriter and actress. From Varberg, Sweden, she first came to the United States to study acting and dance, and was later brought back by Frank Sinatra drummer Gregg Field, to record her original music. In 1998 Margareta embarked on a long string of engagements in mainly Las Vegas and Los Angeles, in addition to her European and worldwide appearances. Audiences have included superstars and world leaders. She is married to world renown singing teacher Seth Riggs, and together they hold master classes in vocal technique. Their daughter Samantha was born in 2012.

=== Siv Cotton ===
(Season 6, 13)

=== Britt Ekland ===
(Season 6–7)

Britt Ekland was born in Stockholm in 1942 and is an actress and singer. She's best known for her roles as a Bond girl in The Man with the Golden Gun, and in the British cult horror film The Wicker Man, as well as her marriage to actor Peter Sellers, and her high-profile social life. In the series there's a lot of focus on her family life and her three children, Victoria, Nic and T.J. Ekland and her family also got their own spin-off series called The Eklands.

== Hollywoodwives history ==
Hollywoodwife	seasons												
Hollywoodwife	1	2	3	4	5	6	7	8	9	10	11	12	13
Maria Montazami													
Anna Anka													
Agnes-Nicole Winter													
Suzanne Saperstein													
Lena Jolton													
Päivi Hacker													
Isabel Adrian													
Gunilla Persson													
Margareta Svensson													
Siv Cotton													
Britt Ekland													
Åsa Vesterlund													
Caroline Grane													
Elena Belle													
Sofie Prydz													
Jennifer Åkerman													

== Reception ==
The first episode of Svenska Hollywoodfruar aired on 14 September 2009 and was watched by approximately 600,000 viewers, making it the most-watched television show in the 9:00 p.m. timeslot. It beat TV4's Kändisdjungeln and Kanal 5's CSI: NY, which drew 527,000 and 504,000 viewers respectively. It was because of this success that the series was expanded from four to five episodes. The fifth episode will contain deleted scenes and highlights from the four earlier episodes. The second episode of Svenska Hollywoodfruar was watched by more than one million viewers, the highest number of viewers for a TV3 production since 2000.

== See also ==
- Hollywood Wives – 1983 novel by Jackie Collins about fictional women in Hollywood
- Hollywood Exes- a VH1 reality show about Ex-wives of famous Hollywood men.
- The Real Housewives of Beverly Hills-, a Bravo reality show about beautiful rich women living in glamorous Beverly Hills, CA
