= Euros of Hollywood =

- Genre: Reality television
- Starring: Isabel Adrian; Massimo Dobrovic; Fawni; Sascha Gerecht; Jannik Olander; Bleona Qereti
- Country of origin: United States
- Original language: English
- No. of seasons: 1
- No. of episodes: 9

Production
- Executive producers: Jennifer O'Connell; Andrew Hoegl; Rob Lee
- Camera setup: Multiple
- Running time: 42 minutes
- Production companies: CORE Media Group; Bayonne Entertainment

Original release
- Network: Bravo
- Release: November 3 – December 30, 2014

Euros of Hollywood is an American reality television series on Bravo that premiered on November 3, 2014. Bravo announced the series in April 2014, as a show featuring a group of Europeans trying to make success in America. The nine-episode season concluded on December 30, 2014.

== Premise ==
The reality series follows six people from different European countries who all live in Los Angeles and try to deal with their own cultural differences while striving to achieve their version of the American Dream. The show features diverse and very ambitious people, "from a pop diva known as the “Madonna of Albania” to a Prada-wearing Italian Renaissance man whose goal is to win an Oscar." The cast members include Isabel Adrian, Massimo Dobrovic, Fawni, Sascha Gerecht, Jannik Olander, and Bleona Qereti.

== Cast ==
- Isabel Adrian is a Swedish television personality who has built a successful career back home as a model, designer and stylist. She is married to DJ Steve Angello of the band Swedish House Mafia.
- Massimo Dobrovic is an Italian actor, model and choreographer, one of whose biggest dreams is winning an Oscar. After escaping Croatia during the war as a boy and making a career as an actor in Italy, Massimo is ready to make it even bigger in America.
- Fawni is an Austrian singer-songwriter, artist and actress. However, after a troublesome divorce from her husband-producer, Fawni is ready to put her both personal and professional life back together.
- Sascha Gerecht is a German DJ, music producer, clothing designer, and night club and restaurant owner. Sascha has moved to Los Angeles to explore any business opportunities, including his own clothing brand and music career.
- Jannik Olander is a Danish jewelry designer and entrepreneur. He began his career working at Ralph Lauren and later founded Nialaya Jewelry, a jewelry brand that is popular with many celebrities in America. In 2011, he opened his first retail outlet on LA's trendy Melrose Avenue.
- Bleona Qereti is an Albanian recording artist and actress. Bleona has been a famous singer in Eastern Europe for over a decade and has released multiple albums throughout her career.

== Episodes ==
| No. | Title | Original release date | U.S. viewers (millions) |
|---|---|---|---|
| 1 | "We Are Euros" | November 3, 2014 | 0.528 |
A group of six people from different European countries decide to come to Los Angeles to chase the American dream while trying to deal with their own cultural differences. Fawni organises a dinner party in order to celebrate the start of a new life after her divorce.
| 2 | "Cold War" | November 10, 2014 | 0.478 |
After misbehaving at Fawni’s dinner party, Bleona attempts to defense herself. Meanwhile, Fawni tries to maintain her business relationship with Isabel.
| 3 | "The Bodyguard" | November 17, 2014 | 0.405 |
Euros feel estranged by Bleona when she brings a bodyguard to Isabel’s party. Jannik gets a job offer.
| 4 | "The Diplomat" | November 24, 2014 | N/A |
Sascha attempts to obviate drama at his party and gets in between Fawni and Bleona. Massimo continues to work on his acting career.
| 5 | "Happy Birthday, German Tank" | December 1, 2014 | 0.393 |
Sascha promotes his brand to his German business partners. Massimo is about to go to Romania after getting an acting gig. Bleona has troubles with her parents struggling with their English.
| 6 | "American Girl" | December 9, 2014 | N/A |
Bleona is excited about her first performance in America at the White Party in Palm Springs. Massimo works on a music video for Isabel. Things get tense between Jannik and Natalie during a photoshoot.
| 7 | "F--- You, I'm Famous" | December 16, 2014 | N/A |
Euros go on a trip to Palm Springs for Bleona’s White Party performance. Isabel gets confronted by the others due to her dishonest behaviour.
| 8 | "The Art of Surprise" | December 23, 2014 | N/A |
Tensions get even higher after the White Party as well as Fawni's upcoming art show which is followed by further confrontations. Fawni surprises everyone during the event.
| 9 | "Secrets Revealed" | December 30, 2014 | N/A |
The special episode features never-before-seen footage from the season.

== Broadcast ==
In Australia, the first episode premiered on Arena on January 1, 2015, before the full series began on February 3, 2015.
