= Seth Riggs =

American vocal coach

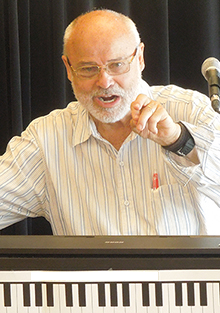
- Seth Riggs at the "Margareta Svensson Riggs and Seth Riggs Summer Vocal Workshop" in Varberg, Sweden July 26, 2013

Background information
- Born: September 19, 1930 (age 96); Washington D.C.
- Occupations: Vocal coach, singer
- Spouse: Margareta Svensson

Seth Riggs (born Samuel Riggs of Reuben III, September 19, 1930) is an American singer, actor, and vocal coach. He has created the vocal technique "Speech Level Singing", and has worked with performers such as Prince, Michael Jackson, Stevie Wonder, Cher, Ray Charles, Josh Groban, Michael Bolton, Olivia Newton-John, Brian Wilson,Madonna, Janet Jackson, Johnny Hallyday, Natalie Cole, Jennifer Lopez, Ozzy Osbourne, Bette Midler, Julio Iglesias Barbra Streisand, José José, Whoopi Goldberg, James Ingram, Val Kilmer, Anita Baker, Earth Wind and Fire and many more.

== Early life, education, and career ==
Riggs started singing when he was about 7 years old, and joined the Washington National Cathedral Boys' Choir as a 9-year-old. Riggs has been a vocal coach since 1949, when he was serving in the Navy as a gunner. He "received his music education from Peabody Conservatory of Music and Manhattan School of Music", and also received a B.A. in drama from Johns Hopkins University. After receiving the Distinguished Alumnus Award from the Peabody Conservatory, Riggs gave a masterclass which Richard Cassilly attended, and afterwards asked Riggs to help him with his voice. Riggs studied voice with teachers including American baritone John Charles Thomas and Italian tenor Tito Schipa, and in New York City with Keith Davis who was at the time teaching the majority of singers on Broadway. Riggs studied acting with Sandy Meisner

In the 1950s and 60s, Riggs performed on Broadway, at the New York City Opera and on tours alongside teaching. Productions included "Happy Hunting" with Ethel Merman. For "South Pacific" Riggs auditioned for Richard Rodgers and Oscar Hammerstein II. After having changed a line and sung it on one breath, contrary to written, Rodgers asked Riggs why. When Riggs answered: "Because I felt like it," Rogers made him promise he would sing it the same way each performance and gave him the role.

In 1967, Riggs moved to Los Angeles and his focus became wholeheartedly on voice teaching. His first star clients were Ann-Margret and Stevie Wonder Then came clients including Carol Burnett, Goldie Hawn and Jane Fonda. With Shirley MacLaine Riggs worked on the film version of Sweet Charity, directed by Bob Fosse, with whom Riggs had performed with in his first musical production; "Pal Joey."

In the early 1980s producer Quincy Jones called Riggs to work with Michael Jackson. Jones wanted Riggs to work with Jackson two hours a day, six days a week, in preparation for and through the entire time recording the Thriller album, which was to become the biggest selling album of all time. Riggs stayed as Michael Jackson's only voice teacher throughout Jackson's career. During the BAD tour, Riggs vocalized Jackson three times a day, and Jackson never missed a show.

Since 2012, Seth Riggs has been teaching with his wife, Margareta Svensson Riggs, a recording and performing artist. Together, they conduct workshops and masterclasses around the world, as well as teach private lessons. Through their work with top-level artists, the technique evolves to be even more effective, efficient and precise to support vocal freedom, health and longevity.

== Seth Riggs Speech Level Singing (SLS) ==
Riggs developed his vocal methods over decades and known as the go-to-person for every singer, Alfred Publishing approached Riggs to write a how-to book on his technique. The book, "Singing for the Stars," includes endorsement from artists like Michael Jackson, Madonna, Jennifer Lopez, Luther Vandross, Stevie Wonder, Ray Charles and many more.

Riggs' technique mixes head voice and chest voice, and makes it possible to have an even and big range without breaks with a powerful sound. A key element in Riggs' singing technique is that the larynx stays on the same general level as speech - therefore the technique came to be called Speech Level Singing.

In 2000 "Seth Riggs Speech Level Singing International" was formed. The organization, "SLS" for short, was aiming to teach teachers how to teach Riggs' vocal technique. SLS, required all of SLS's vocal teachers to undergo lessons and testing from one or more of seven SLS master teachers and be tested and approved if they were to be associated with Seth Riggs

== Personal life ==
Riggs is married to Swedish singer Margareta Svensson, The two met when Svensson came to Seth Riggs for singing lessons in 1995. In 2008, they became a couple, and four years later, in 2012, they married; they have a daughter.

== Bibliography ==
- Singing For The Stars – A Complete Program For Training Your Voice (1992, Alfred Music)
- American Idol Singer's Advantage: Male Version (2008, Hal Leonard Corporation)
