= Agnes-Nicole Winter =

Swedish television personality (born 1956)

Agnes-Nicole Winter also known by the name Nicole Winter (born 17 April 1966) is a Swedish television personality and model. After producing and starring in The Gold & The Beautiful, Agnes-Nicole's rise to prominence quickly advanced with her role in the Swedish reality television series Svenska Hollywoodfruar.

== Biography ==
She was born on 17 April 1966 in She grew up in Borås.

Agnes-Nicole Winter graduated from the Stockholm School of Optometry. Winter started her career in the entertainment industry as a model. After she made her first movie in 1997 she was appointed vice president in charge of production at Hux Enterprises, in Beverly Hills, where she developed, wrote and produced the "Priceless Intentions" project for cable television. Winter was the executive producer and host of the "Agnes Winter Show" where she oversaw the production and the release of the cable TV Show. Winter is president of Global Star Films, Inc. and completed her first feature The Gold & The Beautiful and TV show Swedish Hollywood Wives. An active member of WIF, American Film Institute and Film Independent. She is the founder and the CEO of the non-profit organization Children's After-School Programs Inc. (CAP) The mission of CAP is to help children raised by low income working single parents with funding of supervised after-school programs, and summer camps, a graduate of "Team Beverly Hills, a leadership program sponsored by the Beverly Hills City council and on the board of FOG - Friends of Greystone, FAB - Film Advisory Board, and also a board member of SWEA Film Commission. Swedish Women's Educational Association Inc., is a global non-profit organization for Swedish speaking women who live abroad. An active member at the Beverly Hills Women's Club.

She is a mother of her two sons, who are also involved in Agnes-Nicole's projects as managers and co-producers. Both sons are models and signed with Ford Models.

== Filmography ==
=== Acting ===
- 1987 - Terminal Exposure
- 1988 - The Invisible Kid
- 2010 - Valentine's Day
- 2013 - The Gold & the Beautiful

=== As herself ===
- 2009 - Swedish Hollywood Wives
- 2010 - Swedish Hollywood Wives
- 2011 - Swedish Hollywood Wives
- 2012 - Swedish Hollywood Wives
- 2015 - Swedish Hollywood Wives
- 2017 - Swedish Hollywood Wives

== Awards ==
- The Southern California Motion Picture Council has honored her with a Golden Halo Award for her contribution to the entertainment industry and the performing arts. The Awards Ceremony luncheon in Studio City, California.
- Film Advisory Board: Award of Excellence for The Gold & The Beautiful
- The Treasure Coast Film Festival in Florida, The Gold & The Beautiful: Recipient of the Audience Choice Award and Agnes-Nicole Winter Received the Award for Outstanding First Lead Performance. The film was also Nominated for Best Feature, Best Cinematography, and Best Original Song.
