= Fawni =

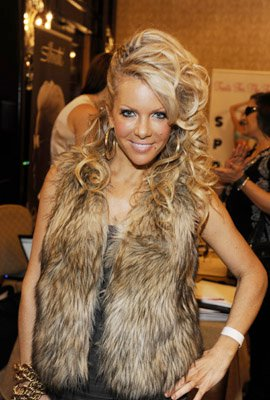

Background information
- Genres: Pop, dance-pop, electronica
- Occupations: Artist, singer-songwriter, actress
- Instrument: Vocals
- Years active: 2002–present
- Label: Universal Music Group
- Website: fawni.com

Fawni is an Austrian singer-songwriter, artist and actress.

== Reality television ==
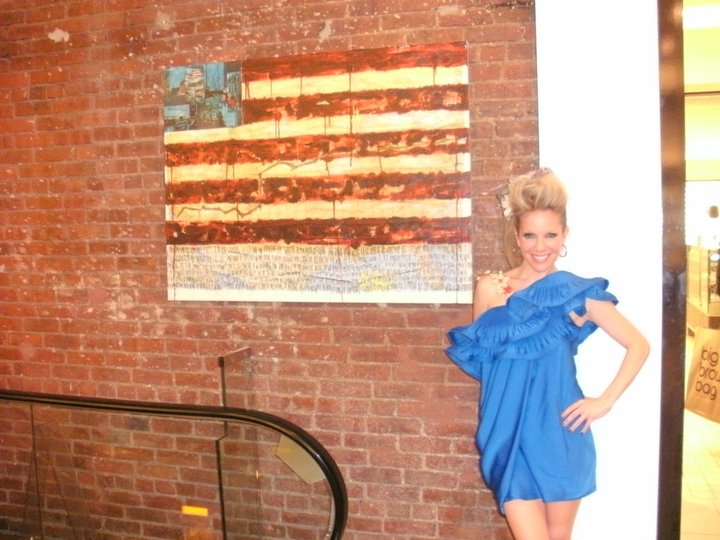
Fawni at the Marc Jacobs Spring-Summer collection '11' debut.

In 2014, Fawni starred in the American reality television series titled Euros of Hollywood which premiered on Bravo network on November 3, 2014. The show featured a group of Europeans trying to make it in America.

== Songs ==
- It's All About You
