= Elena Belle =

Swedish model (born 1985)

- Born: Natacha Peyre Requena; 26 March 1985 (age 41); Ibiza, Spain
- Spouse: Michael Theanne (m. 2016; died 2020)

Elena Belle (born Natacha Peyre Requena, 26 March 1985) is a Swedish blogger, and model. She is best known for being a main cast member of Svenska Hollywoodfruar.

== Early life ==
Born in Ibiza, Spain, she is half-Spanish on her mother's side and fluent in Spanish, Swedish, and English. She is also known as Elena Belle.

== Career ==
In 2005, she participated in the Swedish reality show Paradise Hotel which was broadcast on TV4.

In 2016, she played in the Carl's Jr. commercial for the Three-Way Burger, along with models Emily Sears and Genevieve Morton.

Since 2016, she as well is a main cast member of Svenska Hollywoodfruar which is broadcast on TV3.

She is also the owner of the swimsuit brand Saltyhair. She as a model became the face of the Panos Emporio brand SS20.

== Personal life ==
Belle was married to music producer Michael Theanne. He died in February 2020.

== Discography ==
- TNT (2006)
- In Control (2008)

== Filmography ==
- Aylar - Ett År I Rampelyset (2005)
