= Tiina Rosenberg =

Finnish-born Swedish academic and feminist

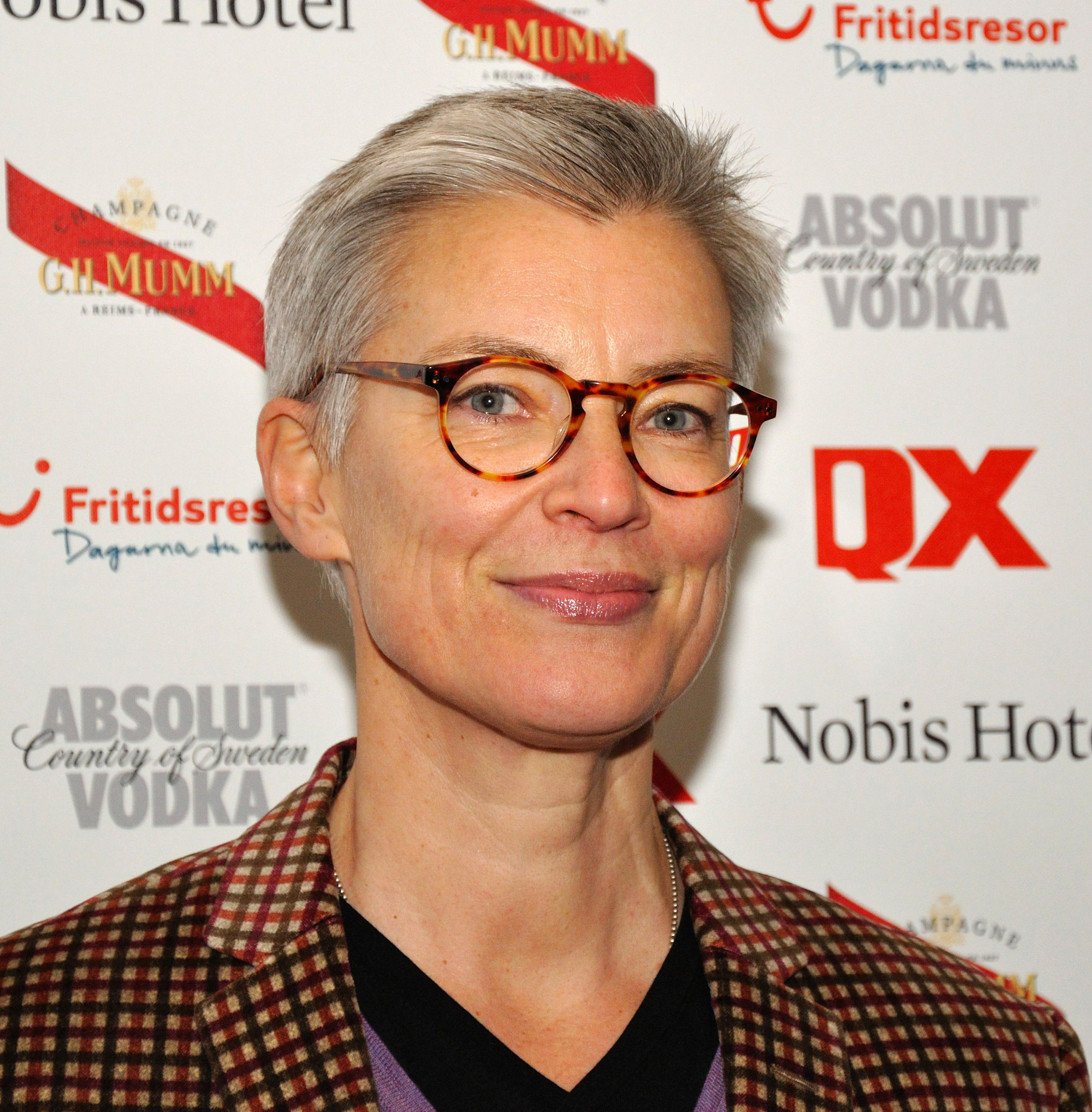
Tiina Rosenberg in 2011

Dont' Be Quiet, Start a Riot

Tiina Maria Pursiainen Rosenberg (born Tiina Maria Pursiainen; 7 July 1958) is a Finnish-born Swedish academic and feminist, who is Professor of Theatre and Performance Studies at Stockholm University. She has formerly been Professor of Gender Studies at Stockholm University and Lund University, and rector of the University of the Arts Helsinki. She was a founding member and board member of the Feminist Initiative political party.

== Career ==
Rosenberg was born and raised in Finland, but made her academic career in Sweden. She studied theatre, film and literature studies at Stockholm University, and earned her PhD in 1993 with the dissertation En regissörs estetik: Ludvig Josephson och den tidigare teaterregin (A director's aesthetics). Her research areas include gender studies, theatre studies, performance studies, queer studies, feminist theory and cultural studies.

Rosenberg has previously been a Professor of Gender Studies at Stockholm University and at Lund University, and was the inspector of Småland Nation, Lund from 2006 to 2012. She served as rector of the University of the Arts Helsinki from 2013 to 2015. She frequently appears in the role of public intellectual in the areas of cultural policy, equality, gender, democracy, and human rights.

Rosenberg identifies as a queer feminist. She is a founding member of the feminist party Feminist Initiative and was formerly a member of the party's executive board.

== Selected bibliography ==
- Byxbegär (Anamma, 2000)
- Queerfeministisk agenda (Atlas, 2002)
- Besvärliga människor. Teatersamtal med Suzanne Osten (Atlas, 2004)
- Teater i Sverige (with Lena Hammergren, Karin Helander and Willmar Sauter, Gidlunds, 2004)
- Könet brinner! Judith Butlers texter i urval (Natur och Kultur 2005)
- L-ordet: Vart tog alla lesbiska vägen? (Normal förlag, 2007)
- Bögarnas Zarah - diva, ikon och kult (Normal förlag, 2009)
- Ilska, hop och solidaritet: Med feministisk scenkonst in i framtiden (Atlas, 2012)
- Arvot mekin ansaitsemme. Kansakunta, demokratia ja tasa-arvo (Tammi 2014)
- Don't Be Quiet, Start a Riot. Essays on Feminism and Performance (Stockholm University Press 2016)
- Mästerregissören. När Ludvig Josephson tog Europa till Sverige (Atlantis, 2017)
- HBTQ spelar roll – mellan garderob och kanon (Leopard 2018)
- The Palgrave Handbook of Queer and Trans Feminisms in Contemporary Performance (Palgrave MacMillan 2021)
- Berätta, överleva, inte drunkna: Antirasism, dekolonisering och migration i svensk teater (Atlas, 2022)
- Milestones in Feminist Performance (Routledge, 2024)
