= I Don't Need Your Love =

Single by Bleona
- Released: 6 July 2018
- Recorded: 2018
- Length: 3:32
- Label: 418 Music Bleona.inc
- Songwriter(s): Bleona Qereti
- Producer(s): Bleona Qereti

Bleona singles chronology
"Monster" (2018)	"I Don't Need Your Love" (2018)	"#Haters" (2019)

"I Don't Need Your Love" is a song produced and recorded by Albanian-American singer and actress Bleona, released as a single on 6 July 2018.

== Background ==
The single became Bleona's first number one on Billboard's Dance Club Songs chart (her second top ten and fourth charted single), reaching the summit in its 16 February 2019 issue.

When Billboard asked her about the song's success and its meaning behind it, Bleona told the magazine "This song means the world to me, as it is a personal story, something that I wrote while I was having a major heartbreak and I had no choice but to put my pain in my music. I believe a lot of girls depend on a guy to give them validation and a lot of guys think a girl cannot succeed without their support, so 'I Don't Need Your Love' sends exactly the type of message that breaks this pattern. I think the phrase, 'guess you thought that I would fall, but damn it, I don't need your love,' pretty much sums it all up."

== Track listing ==
=== Single ===
Digital download
No.	Title	Length
1.	"I Don't Need Your Love"	3:32

=== Remixes (Part 1) ===
Digital download
No.	Title	Length
1.	"I Don't Need Your Love" (Dave Audé 124 Club Mix)	4:54
2.	"I Don't Need Your Love" (Dave Audé 124 Extended Mix)	3:02
3.	"I Don't Need Your Love" (Dave Audé 102 Edit)	4:54
4.	"I Don't Need Your Love" (Alex Acosta Peak Club Mix)	3:42
5.	"I Don't Need Your Love" (Alex Acosta Peak Instrumental Mix)	6:48

=== Remixes (Part 2) ===
Digital download
No.	Title	Length
1.	"I Don't Need Your Love" (StoneBridge Epic Extended Mix)	4:54
2.	"I Don't Need Your Love" (StoneBridge Epic Radio Mix)	3:02
3.	"I Don't Need Your Love" (StoneBridge Epic Extended Instrumental Mix)	4:54
4.	"I Don't Need Your Love" (Slim Tim Mix)	3:42
5.	"I Don't Need Your Love" (Stereosoulz Mix)	6:48

== Charts ==
=== Weekly charts ===
Chart (2018–19)	Peak position
US Dance Club Songs (Billboard)	1

=== Year-end charts ===
Chart (2019)	Position
US Dance Club Songs (Billboard)	8

== See also ==
- List of Billboard number-one dance songs of 2019
