= Bleona =

Albanian and American singer and actress (born 1979)

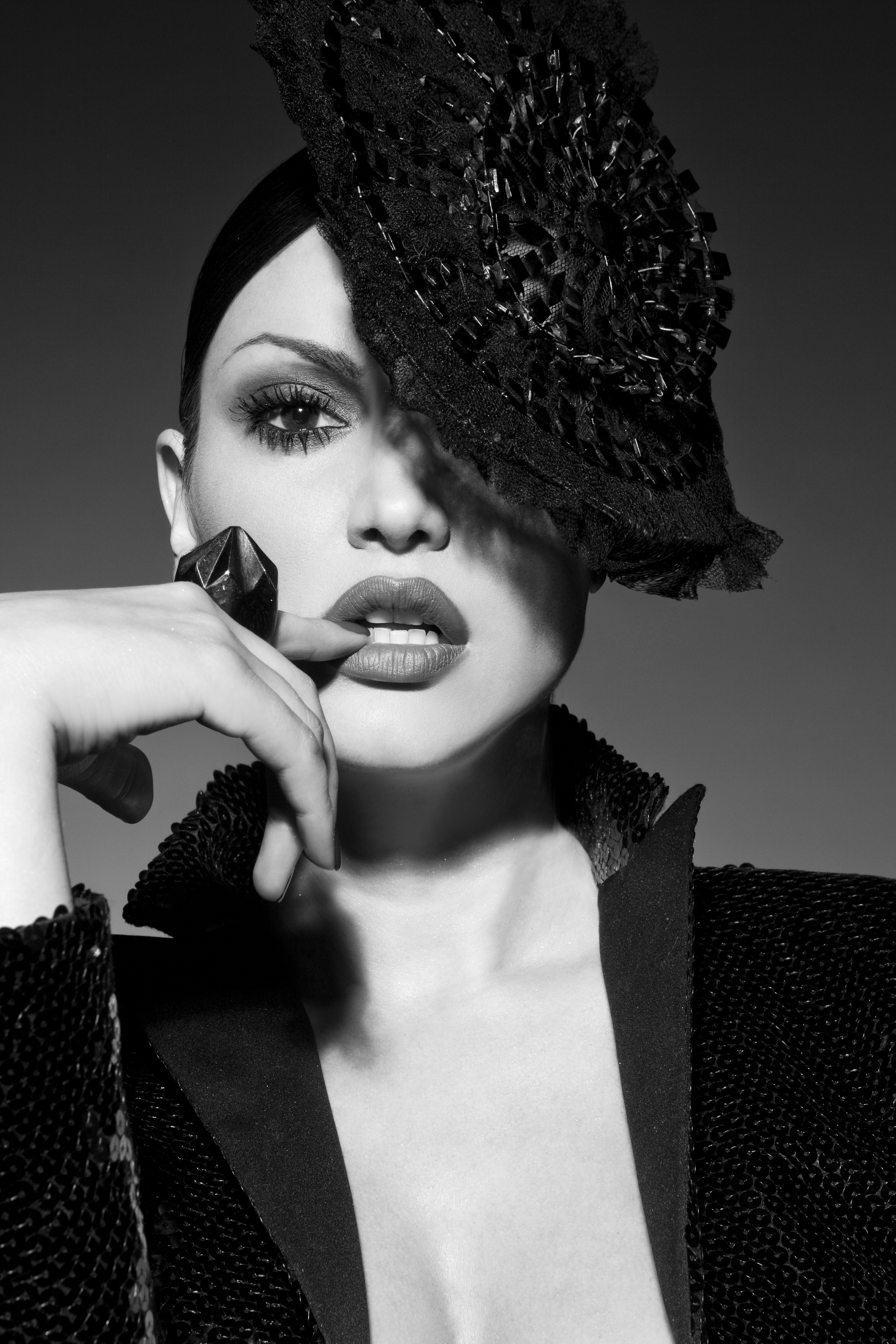
- Qereti in 2012
- Born: Bleona Qereti; May 14, 1979 (age 47); Korçë, Albania
- Education: University of Arts (Albania)
- Occupations: Singer; songwriter; actress; model; television personality
- Years active: 1994–present
- Notable work: Discography
- Television: Euros of Hollywood
- Spouse: Gani Bardha (divorced)
- Musical career
- Instruments: Vocals
- Website: Official website

Bleona Qereti (born May 14, 1979) is an Albanian and American singer-songwriter, actress and model.

== Life ==
Qereti is an American citizen, and, as of 2010, lives in California, where she has worked with producers such as Timbaland, Rodney Jerkins, and Grammy Award winner David Foster. She has released eight studio albums in Albanian, and has released several singles in English, such as "Show Off", "Famous", "Take You Over", "Without You" and "Pass Out," the latter co-produced by Timbaland. On September 10, 2013, she released the single "Take It Like a Man", which went to No. 7 in the UK charts. She was also a celebrity judge on the fourth season of the Albanian version of The X Factor and the breakout star of the 2014 Bravo reality series Euros of Hollywood.

In February 2019, she landed her first number one single on Billboard's Dance Club Songs chart with "I Don't Need Your Love."

== Early life and career ==
Qereti was born on May 14, 1979, in Korçë, the daughter of Albanian parents Oli and Nazmi Qereti.

Bleona began singing at age 5 when she joined the House of Pionieri. At 13, her parents encouraged her to focus on academics and give up on singing, but against their advice, she continued to pursue a career in entertainment. When she was 14 years old, Bleona earned an audition and landed her first major role as the lead singer for the Skampa Theater in Elbasan.

Following a performance at the Albanian National Music Festival at age 15, Bleona became a household name in her native country. She released her first single "Lermëni (Let Me Be Free)" in 1996, and the following year issued her debut album Kam Qejfin Tim (I Run My Own Game). Bleona's first major tour took place that year, and she performed 25 summer shows at concert halls in Switzerland and Germany. Bleona has said she learned Italian through music and often performs in Italian, and she also records in English and Albanian. She studied the Stanislavski System of acting, graduating with a BA from the Academy of Performing Arts in Tirana. She also plays violin.

=== 1998–2008 ===
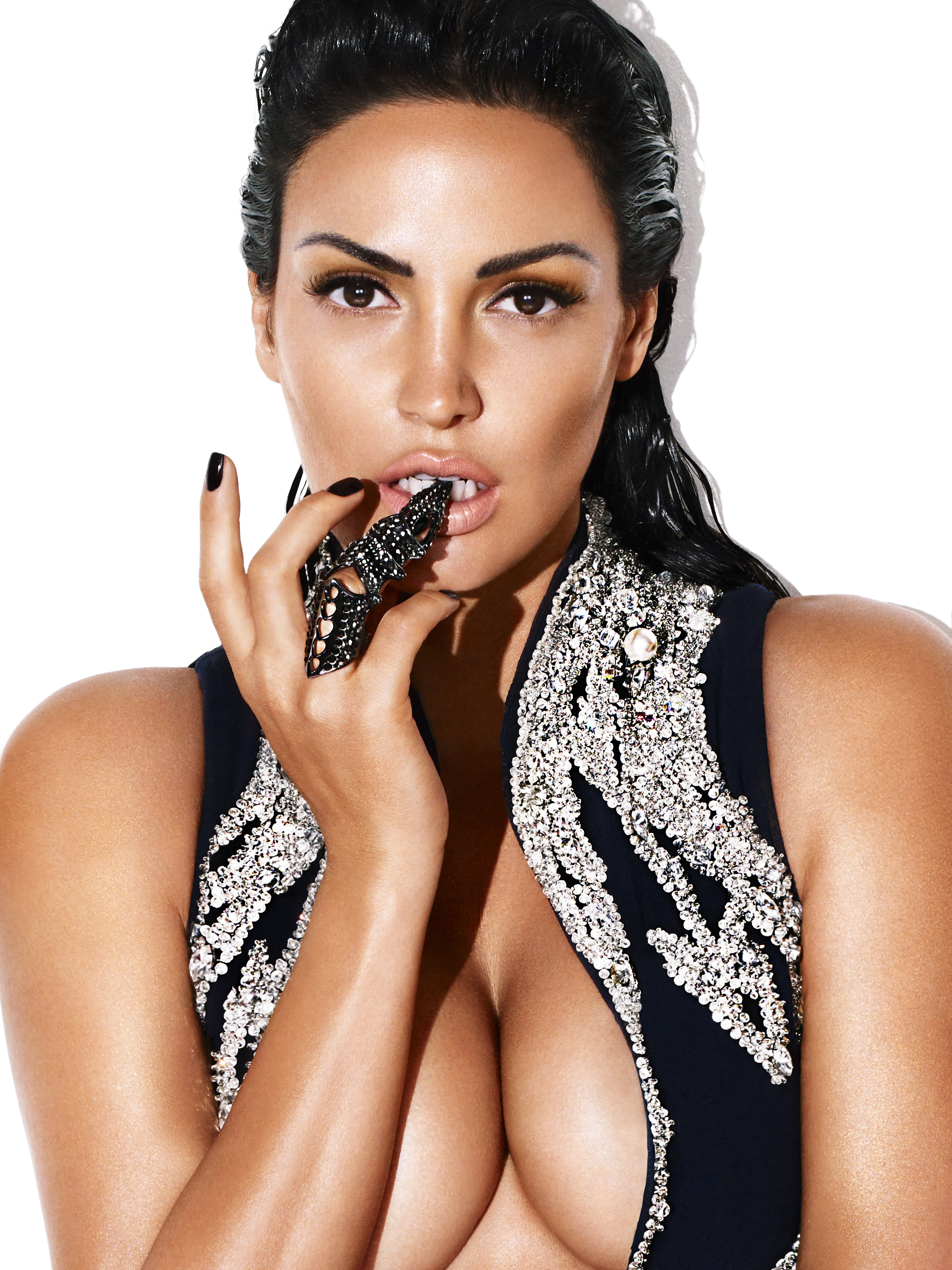

From 1998 through 2002, Bleona released four albums, all of which reached the charts in southeastern Europe. In 1999 she headlined the Humanitarian Tour for the People of Kosovo, where she played a number of concerts around Europe. From 2000 to 2001, she performed more than 80 concerts across Europe, and by 2002 was headlining outdoor concerts and festivals. In 2002, a concert program titled Nje xhiro neper Shqiperi (Walking Through Albania) was issued; footage is available online. In 2003, Bleona released Ti Nuk Di As Me Ma Lyp. A 2004 piece in the Albanian daily Panorama relayed her own claim that the album had sold 400,000 copies by that time.

Since 2013, she has performed at U.S. events including White Party Palm Springs and Las Vegas Pride, and she staged concerts in the Balkans in 2012.

In 2005, her song S'dua received the Television Prize (Çmimi Televiziv) at the Kënga Magjike (Magic Song) festival in Tirana, Albania. According to her official biography, Bleona's eighth album, Mandarin, reportedly sold over 800,000 copies in 2007, breaking her previous record. In theme with the album, which means "tangerine", she dyed her hair red in 2006 and kept it that way until 2007, featuring the color in three music videos. In 2008, Bleona won two awards (media and internet) with the song "Magnetic" at the "Magic Song Festival Awards".

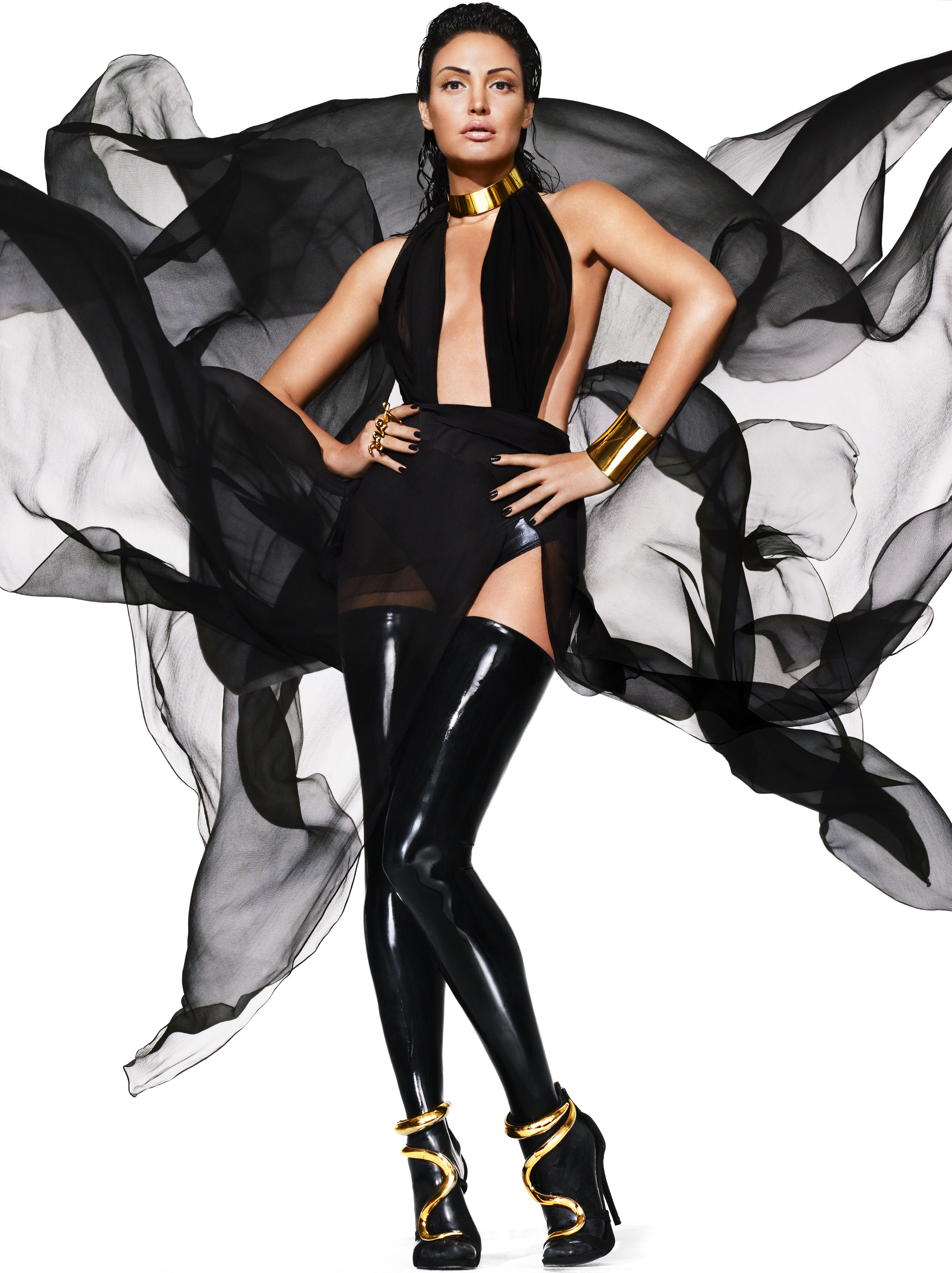
Bleona on the cover of CCercle Magazine.

=== 2009–2012 ===
Bleona moved to the U.S. in September 2010. Shortly afterward, she met producer Timbaland while both were attending the Grammy Awards, and after a year of discussions, she began working with him on three new tracks. Her first English language single, "Show Off", featuring Petey Pablo, was released on September 27, 2010. Bleona has also worked on songs with Rodney Jerkins, Makeba, and Jimmy Douglass.

In February 2011, Bleona became a citizen of the United States.

In September 2012, Bleona's co-produced single with Timbaland, "Pass Out", featuring Brasco, was released. She toured Europe to promote the single, performing in Albania in the cities of Vlora, Elbasan, Shkoder and Tirana; the capital city of Pristina in Kosovo; Tetovo in Macedonia and Düsseldorf, Germany. Supporting her on tour was DJ Freestyle Steve and Brasco. According to CNA, in 2012, Bleona's tour concerts “exceeded all expectations, reaching over 70,000 spectators.”

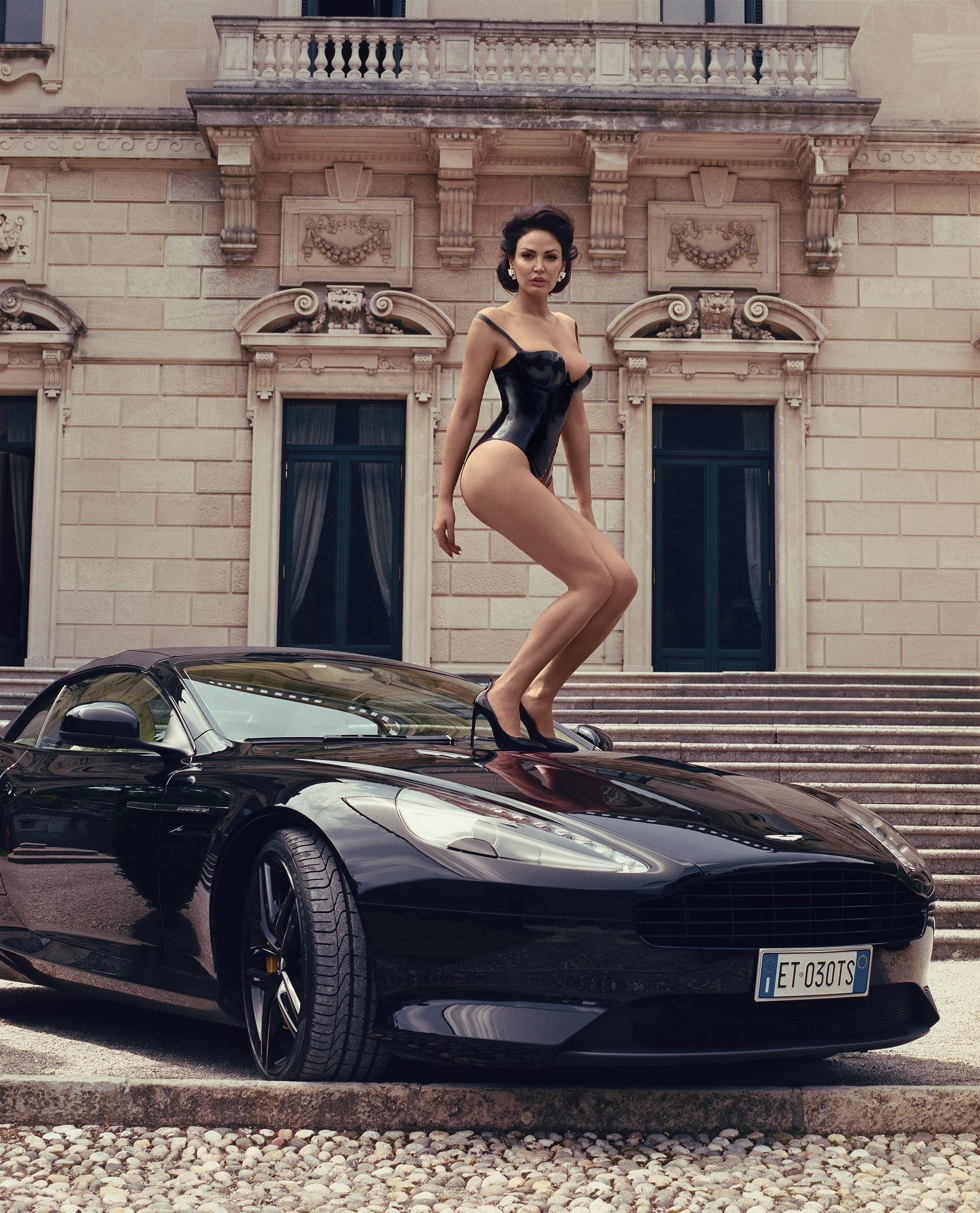
A shooting for the music video of "Monster" in Italy.

=== 2013–2019 ===
In mid-2013, Bleona announced the release of her single "Take It Like a Man", produced by StopWaitGo. A review on EQ Music Blog described "Take It Like a Man" as "a pop fizzy anthem that bubbles with euro pop sensibility". She celebrated the track reaching number 7 on the UK club charts by headlining Las Vegas Gay Pride on September 7, 2013.

Bleona was invited to perform consecutive years at the Palm Springs White Party, in 2013 and 2014.

In 2015, following her time as a judge on X Factor Europe, Bleona's single "Take You Over" peaked at number 3 on the Billboard Dance Club Songs chart.

Bleona recorded her version of the 1980s Italian hit song "Su di noi", originally by Enzo Ghinazzi. Her music video for the track was shot at the iconic El Matador Beach in Malibu, California. In February 2019, she landed her first number-one single on the Billboard Dance Club Songs chart with the hit track "I Don't Need Your Love".

== Other ventures ==
=== Television ===
Bleona made her acting debut in 2012 with an appearance in an episode of Steven Seagal's True Justice. In 2017, she landed a role alongside Dolph Lundgren in Dead Trigger. The following year, Bleona appeared in 211, an action-thriller starring Nicolas Cage. Bleona was cast as Nova in the 2019 series Paper Empire in what would be her first major role alongside Wesley Snipes, Denise Richards, Robert Ravi and Anne Archer.

In February 2014, Bleona started shooting a new reality television series titled Euros of Hollywood which premiered on November 3, 2014, on Bravo. The show followed Bleona recording her first album in English and her life in America on becoming a global superstar. In 2015, Bleona returned to Albania where she was a member of the X Factor jury. In 2016, she was a member of the Albanian Your Face Sounds Familiar jury. Bleona played the role of Nova in the series Paper Empire, which debuted in 2019. The show featured an ensemble cast including Wesley Snipes, Denise Richards, Robert Davi, and Anne Archer. In 2021, Bleona joined the Albanian reality television show Love Story as an opinionist.

== Television ==
Television
Title	Year	Role	Ref
Fashion News Live	2011	Herself	
Red Carpet Report	2012	Herself	
True Justice	2012	Luna	
Euros of Hollywood	2014	Herself	
X Factor: Albania	2015	Herself	
Your Face Sounds Familiar Albania	2016	Herself	
Paper Empire	2020	Nova	
Love Story	2021	Herself	

== Films ==
Films
Title	Year	Role	Ref
211	2018	Christine	
Dead Trigger	2019	Natalie	
Falco	2019	Frida Kodra	
Chief of Station	2024	Bianca	

== Personal life ==
Qereti is fluent in Albanian, English and Italian. In 2009, she moved to Los Angeles and became an American citizen in 2011.

In December 2025, Qereti appeared on the cover of Vogue Belleza, the beauty edition of Vogue México.

She was married to businessman Gani Bardha from 2001 until 2011. After their divorce it was released later that Qereti dated Bardha again and is still living with him since 2019.

== Discography ==
- Kam Qejfin Tim (1997)
- Nese Me Do Fort (1999)
- S'me Behet Vone (2001)
- Ik Meso Si Dashurohet (2002)
- Ti Nuk Di As Me Ma Lyp (2003)
- Greatest Hits (2005)
- Boom Boom (2005)
- Mandarin (2007)

=== Weekly charts ===
I Don't Need Your Love (2019)	Peak position
US Dance Club Songs (Billboard)	1

Wicked Love (2018)	Peak position
US Dance Club Songs (Billboard)	12

Monster (2018)	Peak position
US Dance Club Songs (Billboard)	12

Take You Over (2015)	Peak position
US Dance Club Songs (Billboard)	3
US Hot Dance/Electronic Songs (Billboard)	28

== Billboard Dance Chart success ==
Bleona has achieved notable success on the Billboard Dance Club Songs and Dance/Electronic Songs charts, with several of her singles reaching high positions.

- "Take It Like a Man" peaked at number 31 on the Billboard Dance Club Songs chart.
- "Take You Over" charted at number 3 on the Billboard Dance Club Songs chart and number 28 on the Billboard Dance/Electronic Songs chart.
- "Wicked Love" reached number 12 on the Billboard Dance Club Songs chart.
- "I Don't Need Your Love" reached number 1 on the Billboard Dance Club Songs chart.
- "Monster" peaked at number 12 on the Billboard Dance Club Songs chart.
