= Anna Anka =

Swedish and American model, actress, and author (born 1971)

- Anna Åberg
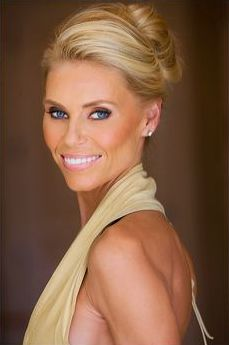
- Born: Danuta Anna Kołodziejska; 1971 (age 54–55); Poland
- Other names: Anna Yeager; Anna Åberg
- Occupations: Model; actress; author
- Known for: Dumb and Dumber; Svenska Hollywoodfruar
- Television: Svenska Hollywoodfruar; Anna Anka söker assistent
- Spouses: Louis Yeager (divorced); Paul Anka (m. 2008; div. 2010)
- Children: 2
- Website: annaanka.com

Anna Anka (née Danuta Anna Kołodziejska, previously Åberg; born 1971) is a Polish-Swedish and American model, actress, and author. She was married to Canadian singer Paul Anka. Anka is featured in the Swedish reality show Svenska Hollywoodfruar (Swedish Hollywood Wives).

== Early life ==
Originally named Danuta Anna Kołodziejska, Anna Anka was born in what was then the Polish People's Republic. Her mother died during childbirth. At the age of three, Anka was adopted by a Swedish couple named Åberg living in Bjuv, Sweden. She moved to the United States in 1994 to work as a model after placing eighth in the international Miss Hawaiian Tropic pageant. Her participation in the Miss Hawaiian Tropic pageant barred her from participating in the Miss Sweden pageant that year. Previous reports stated that Anka participated in Miss Sweden in 1994 but Veckorevyn—which was the owner and operator of the Miss Sweden beauty pageant at the time—found no evidence of her participating in either the 1993 or 1994 pageants, though she did participate in Miss Scania's 1993 pageant.

== Career ==
Anka made a brief appearance in the American film Dumb and Dumber, credited as Anna Åberg. She had two lines, both in Swedish: Hej allihopa (Hi everyone) and Hej då (Bye). She has also played minor roles in the films The Specialist and Drop Zone.

Anka has released a workout and training book called The 30-minute pregnancy workout book: The Complete Light Weight Program for Fitness.

=== Svenska Hollywoodfruar ===
In 2009, Anka became known to a wider public in the reality show Svenska Hollywoodfruar where she was one of three Swedish women who lived in Hollywood. The program, which was shown on Swedish TV3, had the highest ratings ever and set a new viewer-record for a program made by TV3.

=== Newsmill article ===
On 16 September 2009, Anka was interviewed on Swedish news site, Newsmill, in an article called "Jag vill bli en förebild för svenska kvinnor" ("I want to be a role model for Swedish women"). The article described Swedish fathers as "tragic with their diaper changes and their equality" and Swedish women in general as shabby, petty, unintelligent and having lost touch with their natural femininity. A resounding appeal was made for the choice of a housewife lifestyle like Anka's own, and she affirmed her wish to become the role model that Sweden needed. It was later revealed and acknowledged by the publishers that the piece had been ghost-written by site editors after a phone talk with Anka in order to increase attention. The article received more than 100,000 hits, a first for Newsmill, and several responses, including from Nalin Pekgul.

== Personal life ==
In 1999, she was hired as the personal trainer of musician Paul Anka. They married in 2008, at which point she became a full-time housewife with her two children, a son she had with Paul Anka in 2005 and an older daughter from her first marriage with Louis Yeager. In December 2009, Paul Anka filed for divorce after Anna Anka called the police during an argument with him over her decision to fire one of their housekeepers. According to Anna, Paul had pointed a gun at her. Paul denied the allegation and filed a defamation lawsuit in February 2010 against her in response, both for this and other allegations. Subsequent review of their mansion's surveillance footage provided no evidence of any such event. Among other allegations, Paul also alleged in his suit that previously—during an argument in November 2009—police arrested Anna for felony domestic battery after wounding him, but Paul insisted at the time that the charges be dropped. The suit was dismissed with prejudice five months later, in July 2010, thereby barring relitigation. Later that year, two years after marrying, Paul and Anna Anka divorced. By August 2014, Anna Anka said she was on good terms with Paul, though not with her first husband.

In June 2017, Anka lost custody of her son after a ruling which assigned custody to Paul Anka without any mandate for guaranteed visitation or family therapy. In August 2017, Anna Anka appealed the decision, which Paul Anka criticized.
