= Sweden in the Eurovision Song Contest 2024 =

- Eurovision Song Contest 2024
- Participating broadcaster: Sveriges Television (SVT)
- Country: Sweden
- Selection process: Melodifestivalen 2024
- Selection date: 9 March 2024

Competing entry
- Song: "Unforgettable"
- Artist: Marcus & Martinus
- Songwriters: Jimmy "Joker" Thörnfeldt; Joy Deb; Linnea Deb; Marcus Gunnarsen; Martinus Gunnarsen

Placement
- Final result: 9th, 174 points

Participation chronology

Sweden was represented at the Eurovision Song Contest 2024 with the song "Unforgettable", written by Jimmy "Joker" Thörnfeldt, Joy Deb, Linnea Deb, Marcus and Martinus Gunnarsen, and performed by Marcus and Martinus. The Swedish participating broadcaster, Sveriges Television (SVT), organised Melodifestivalen 2024 in order to select its entry for the contest. In addition, SVT was also the host broadcaster and staged the event at the Malmö Arena in Malmö, after winning the previous edition with the song "Tattoo" by Loreen.

As the host country, Sweden automatically qualified to compete in the final of the Eurovision Song Contest. Performing in position 1, the country placed ninth out of the 25 performing countries with 174 points.

== Background ==
Prior to the 2024 contest, Sveriges Radio (SR) until 1979, and Sveriges Television (SVT) since 1980, had participated in the Eurovision Song Contest representing Sweden sixty-two times since SR's first entry in 1958. They have won the contest on seven occasions (tying with Ireland for the most wins): in 1974 with the song "Waterloo" performed by ABBA, in 1984 with the song "Diggi-Loo Diggi-Ley" performed by Herreys, in 1991 with the song "Fångad av en stormvind" performed by Carola, in 1999 with the song "Take Me to Your Heaven" performed by Charlotte Nilsson, in 2012 with the song "Euphoria" performed by Loreen, in 2015 with the song "Heroes" performed by Måns Zelmerlöw, and in 2023 with "Tattoo" again performed by Loreen, who became the second artist (after Ireland's Johnny Logan), as well as the first female artist, to win the contest more than once. Following the introduction of semi-finals for the 2004 contest, the Swedish entries, to this point, have featured in every final, except for 2010.

As part of its duties as participating broadcaster, SVT organises the selection of its entry in the Eurovision Song Contest and broadcasts the event in the country. Since 1959, SR first and SVT later have organised the annual competition Melodifestivalen in order to select their entries for the contest.

== Before Eurovision ==
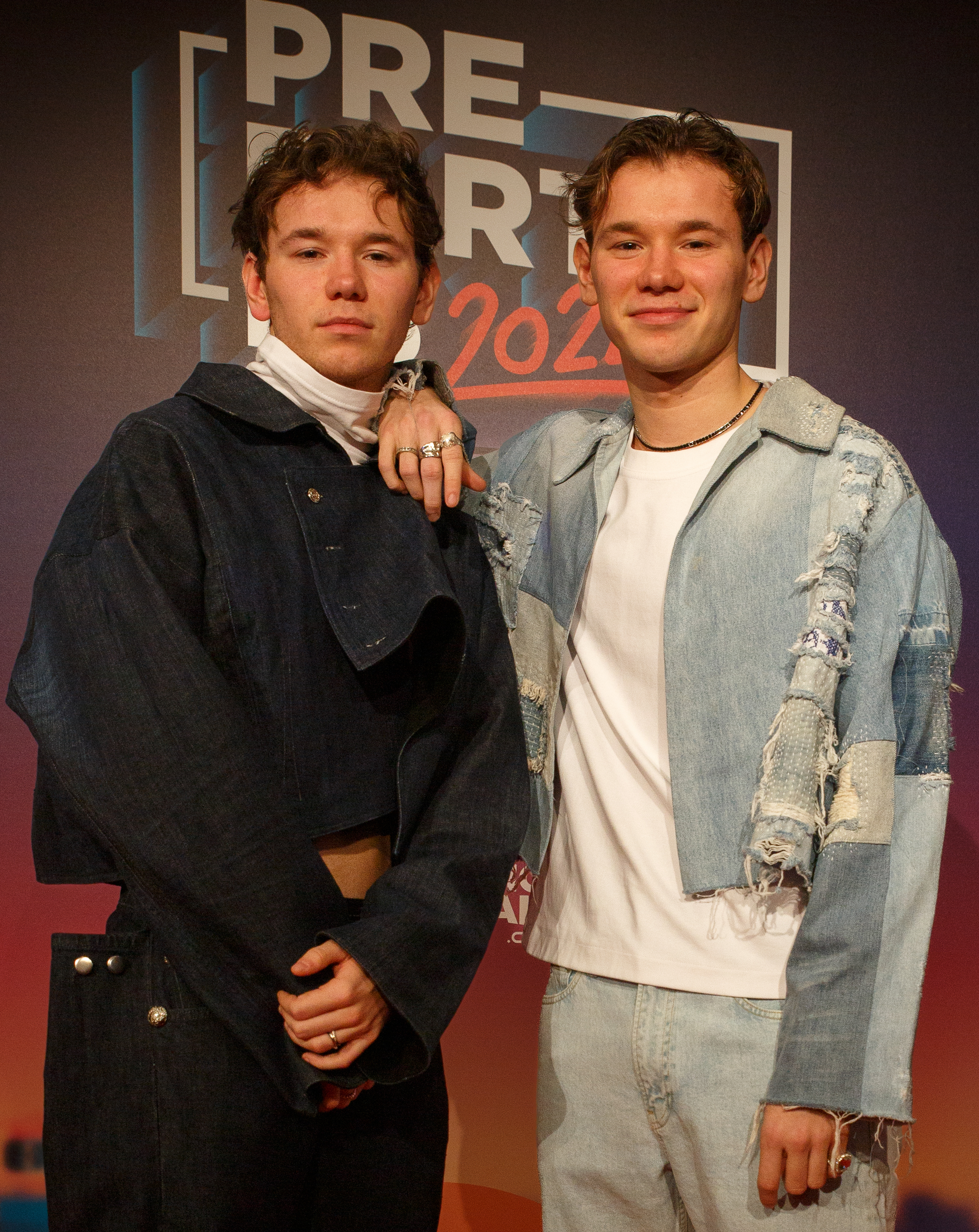
Marcus & Martinus, winners of Melodifestivalen 2024, at the PrePartyES event in Madrid

=== Melodifestivalen 2024 ===
The 2024 edition of Melodifestivalen took place between 3 February and 9 March 2024 across six Swedish cities. It featured five heats (the fifth replacing the previously held semi-final) and a final. A submission period was open between 25 August and 15 September 2023 to select 30 competing entries.

==== Heats ====
- The first heat took place on 3 February 2024 at Malmö Arena in Malmö. "Heroes Are Calling" performed by Smash Into Pieces and "Awful Liar" performed by Lisa Ajax qualified directly to the final, while "Forever Yours" performed by Elisa Lindström and "Supernatural" performed by Adam Woods advanced to the final qualification round. "Hela världen väntar" performed by Samir & Viktor and "Min melodi" performed by Melina Borglowe were eliminated from the contest.
- The second heat took place on 10 February 2024 at Scandinavium in Gothenburg. "Dragon" performed by Liamoo and "When I'm Gone" performed by Maria Sur qualified directly to the final, while "The Silence After You" performed by Dear Sara and "Unga & fria" performed by Fröken Snusk advanced to the final qualification round. "Ahumma" performed by C-Joe and "Norrland" performed by Engmans Kapell were eliminated from the contest.
- The third heat took place on 17 February 2024 at Vida Arena in Växjö. "Effortless" performed by Jacqline and "Give My Heart a Break" performed by Cazzi Opeia qualified directly to the final, while "För dig" performed by Klaudy and "I Won't Shake (La La Gunilla)" performed by Gunilla Persson advanced to the final qualification round. "Aldrig mer" performed by Clara Klingenström and "Take My Breath Away" performed by Kim Cesarion were eliminated from the contest.
- The fourth heat took place on 24 February 2024 at Stiga Sports Arena in Eskilstuna. "Happy That You Found Me" performed by Danny Saucedo and "It's Not Easy to Write a Love Song" performed by Dotter qualified directly to the final, while "Done Getting Over You" performed by Albin Tingwall and "Circus X" performed by Scarlet advanced to the final qualification round. "30 km/h" performed by Lia Larsson and "En sång om sommaren" performed by Lasse Stefanz were eliminated from the contest.
- The fifth heat took place on 2 March 2024 at Löfbergs Arena in Karlstad. "Unforgettable" performed by Marcus & Martinus and "Que Sera" performed by Medina qualified directly to the final, while "Light" performed by Annika Wickihalder and "Back to My Roots" performed by Jay Smith advanced to the final qualification round. "Controlla" performed by Chelsea Muco and "Banne maj" performed by Elecktra were eliminated from the contest.
  - Immediately following the fifth heat, a final qualification round took place. All of the songs competed against each other, with each song's votes from their individual heats determining a new set of points, which when combined with a second round of voting held during the final qualification round, determining the top two songs which advanced to the final. "Light" performed by Annika Wickihalder and "Back to My Roots" performed by Jay Smith qualified to the final, while "Forever Yours" performed by Elisa Lindström, "Supernatural" performed by Adam Woods, "The Silence After You" performed by Dear Sara, "Unga & fria" performed by Fröken Snusk, "För dig" performed by Klaudy, "I Won't Shake (La La Gunilla)" performed by Gunilla Persson, "Done Getting Over You" performed by Albin Tingwall, and "Circus X" performed by Scarlet were eliminated from the contest.

==== Final ====
The final took place on 9 March 2024 at the Friends Arena in Stockholm.

R/O	Artist	Song	Juries	Televote	Total	Place
1	Maria Sur	"When I'm Gone"	37	35	72	7
2	Jay Smith	"Back to My Roots"	20	26	46	10
3	Lisa Ajax	"Awful Liar"	26	11	37	11
4	Smash Into Pieces	"Heroes Are Calling"	31	59	90	3
5	Cazzi Opeia	"Give My Heart a Break"	46	41	87	4
6	Annika Wickihalder	"Light"	38	25	63	8
7	Marcus & Martinus	"Unforgettable"	85	92	177	1
8	Dotter	"It's Not Easy to Write a Love Song"	26	8	34	12
9	Medina	"Que Sera"	43	61	104	2
10	Liamoo	"Dragon"	38	45	83	5
11	Jacqline	"Effortless"	40	21	61	9
12	Danny Saucedo	"Happy That You Found Me"	34	40	74	6

=== Promotion ===
As part of the promotion of their participation in the contest, Marcus & Martinus attended the PrePartyES in Madrid on 30 March 2024, the London Eurovision Party on 7 April 2024, the Eurovision in Concert event in Amsterdam on 13 April 2024, the Nordic Eurovision Party in Stockholm on 14 April 2024 and the Nordic Music Celebration's Eurovision Night in Oslo on 20 April 2024.

== At Eurovision ==
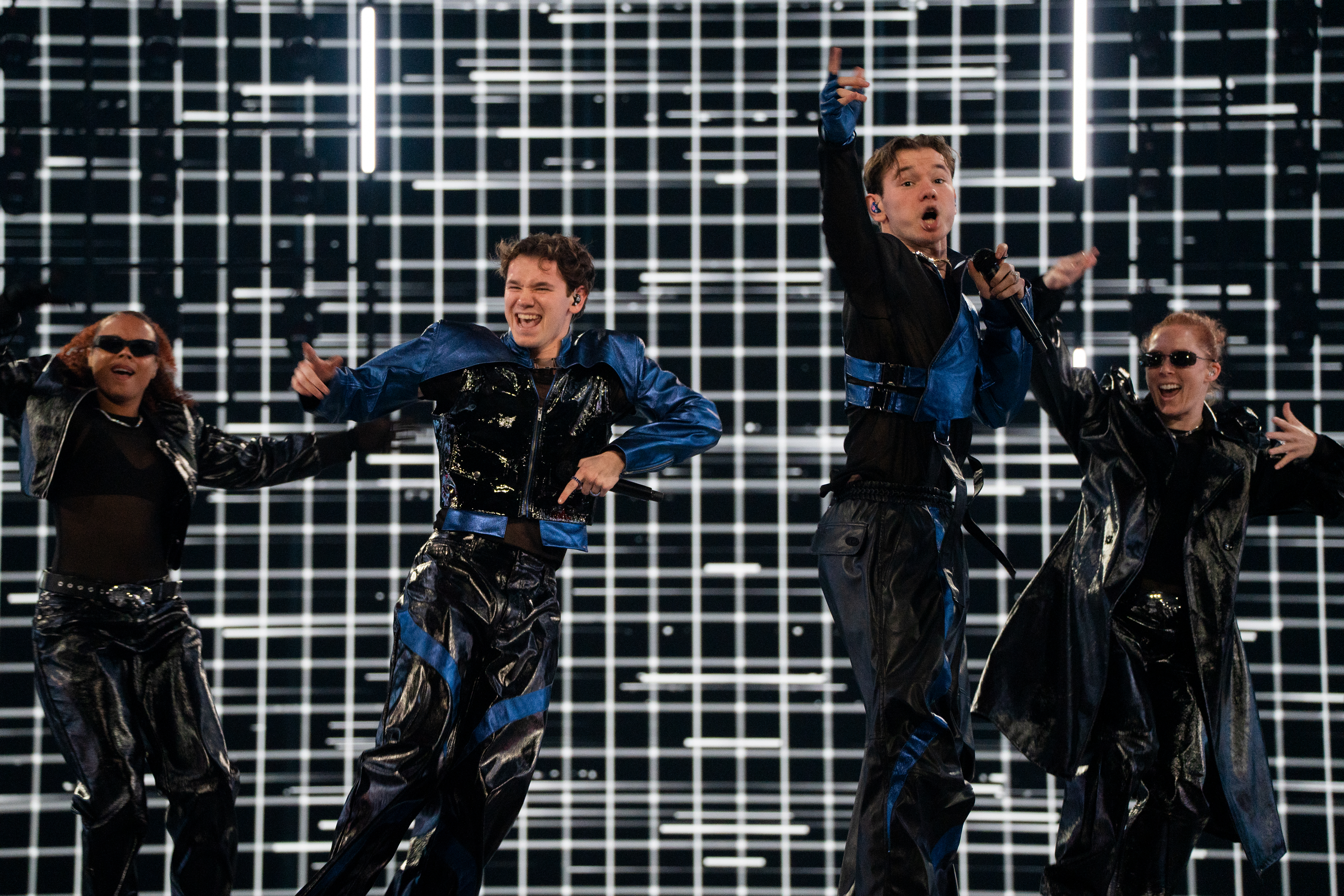
Marcus and Martinus performing in the final.

The Eurovision Song Contest 2024 took place at the Malmö Arena in Malmö, Sweden, and consisted of two semi-finals held on the respective dates of 7 and 9 May and the final on 11 May 2024. All nations with the exceptions of the host country and the "Big Five" (France, Germany, Italy, Spain and the United Kingdom) were required to qualify from one of two semi-finals in order to compete in the final; the top ten countries from each semi-final progressed to the final. As the host country, Sweden automatically qualified to compete in the final on 11 May 2024, but is also required to broadcast and vote in one of the two semi-finals. This was decided via a draw held during the semi-final allocation draw on 30 January 2024, when it was announced that Sweden would be voting in the first semi-final. Despite being an automatic qualifier for the final, the Swedish entry was also performed during the semi-final. On 11 March 2024, during the Heads of Delegation meeting, Sweden was drawn to open the grand final in position 1. It was the first time since 1970 that a host country has opened the final.

In Sweden, all shows were broadcast on SVT1 as well as online via SVT Play, with commentary by Tina Mehrafzoon and Edward af Sillén, and on radio via SR P4, with commentary by Carolina Norén. The three shows are also available in the Finnish Yle-operated broadcasts on TV Finland, with Finnish commentary by Mikko Silvennoinen and Swedish commentary by Eva Frantz and Johan Lindroos, and SVT Play, with Inari Sámi commentary by Heli Huovinen and Northern Sámi commentary by Aslak Paltto. In addition, as part of the Eurovision programming, SVT and DR cooperated with other EBU member broadcasters – namely ARD/WDR, the BBC, ČT, ERR, France Télévisions, NRK, NTR, RÚV, VRT and Yle – to produce and air a documentary titled ABBA – Against the Odds, on the occasion of the 50th anniversary of Sweden's first victory at the contest with "Waterloo" by ABBA.

=== Performance ===
Marcus & Martinus took part in technical rehearsals on 2 and 4 May, followed by dress rehearsals on 10 and 11 May. Their performance of "Unforgettable" at the contest had a staging similar to the one at Melodifestivalen, with four supporting dancers joining them on stage; the duo stated that they had been inspired by the style of Super Bowl halftime shows, with 2023 winner Loreen commenting that the staging was reminiscent of The Matrix.

=== Final ===
On 11 March 2024, during the Heads of Delegation meeting, Sweden was drawn to open the grand final in position 1. The country was followed by Ukraine in position 2. Marcus and Martinus took part in dress rehearsals on 10 and 11 May before the final, including the jury final where the professional juries cast their final votes before the live show on 11 May. They performed a repeat of their semi-final performance during the final on 11 May. Sweden placed ninth in the final, scoring 174 points; 49 points from the public televoting and 125 points from the juries.

=== Voting ===
Below is a breakdown of points awarded to and by Sweden in the first semi-final and in the final. Voting during the three shows involved each country awarding sets of points from 1-8, 10 and 12: one from their professional jury and the other from televoting in the final vote, while the semi-final vote was based entirely on the vote of the public. The Swedish jury consisted of Robin Bengtsson, who represented Sweden in the 2017 contest, Ellen Berg, Henrik Olsson, Boris René, and Elin Trogen. In the final, Sweden placed 9th with 174 points, receiving the maximum twelve points in the jury vote from Germany. Over the course of the contest, Sweden awarded its 12 points to Croatia in the first semi-final, and to Switzerland (jury) and Israel (televote) in the final.

SVT appointed Frans Jeppsson Wall, who represented Sweden in the 2016 contest, as its spokesperson to announce the Swedish jury's votes in the final.

==== Points awarded to Sweden ====
Points awarded to Sweden (Final)
Score	Televote	Jury
12 points		Germany
10 points	Norway	Ireland
8 points	Moldova	Czechia; Spain; Ukraine
7 points	Iceland	Finland
6 points	Denmark	Estonia; Italy; United Kingdom
5 points	Serbia	Australia; Azerbaijan; Denmark; Latvia; Lithuania; Poland; Serbia
4 points		
3 points	Czechia	Belgium; Norway; Portugal
2 points	Croatia; Poland	Croatia; Cyprus; San Marino
1 point	Cyprus; Estonia; Greece; Lithuania; Malta; Slovenia	Greece; Iceland; Luxembourg; Moldova

==== Points awarded by Sweden ====
Points awarded by Sweden (Semi-final 1)
Score	Televote
12 points	Croatia
10 points	Ukraine
8 points	Finland
7 points	Luxembourg
6 points	Ireland
5 points	Lithuania
4 points	Australia
3 points	Poland
2 points	Iceland
1 point	Cyprus

Points awarded by Sweden (Final)
Score	Televote	Jury
12 points	Israel	Switzerland
10 points	Croatia	Croatia
8 points	Ukraine	United Kingdom
7 points	Switzerland	Italy
6 points	France	Luxembourg
5 points	Finland	France
4 points	Ireland	Portugal
3 points	Lithuania	Ukraine
2 points	Armenia	Cyprus
1 point	Italy	Austria

==== Detailed voting results ====
Each participating broadcaster assembles a five-member jury panel consisting of music industry professionals who are citizens of the country they represent. Each jury, and individual jury member, is required to meet a strict set of criteria regarding professional background, as well as diversity in gender and age. No member of a national jury was permitted to be related in any way to any of the competing acts in such a way that they cannot vote impartially and independently. The individual rankings of each jury member as well as the nation's televoting results were released shortly after the grand final.

The following members comprised the Swedish jury:

- Robin Bengtsson
- Annie Beata Ellen Berg
- Boris René Lumbana
- Per Oscars Henrik Olsson
- Elin Trogen

Detailed voting results from Sweden (Semi-final 1)
R/O	Country	Televote	
R/O	Country	Rank	Points
01	Cyprus	10	1
02	Serbia	12	
03	Lithuania	6	5
04	Ireland	5	6
05	Ukraine	2	10
06	Poland	8	3
07	Croatia	1	12
08	Iceland	9	2
09	Slovenia	14	
10	Finland	3	8
11	Moldova	15	
12	Azerbaijan	13	
13	Australia	7	4
14	Portugal	11	
15	Luxembourg	4	7

Detailed voting results from Sweden (Final)
R/O	Country	Jury							Televote	
R/O	Country	Juror A	Juror B	Juror C	Juror D	Juror E	Rank	Points	Rank	Points
01	Sweden									
02	Ukraine	3	16	8	6	17	8	3	3	8
03	Germany	15	18	9	12	6	15		16	
04	Luxembourg	9	14	4	5	4	5	6	21	
~~05~~	~~Netherlands~~ ‡ (Note: The Netherlands was disqualified prior to the final.)	~~4~~	~~25~~	~~24~~	~~15~~	~~24~~	~~17~~		N/A	
06	Israel	16	17	7	14	7	16		1	12
07	Lithuania	8	24	23	4	18	13		8	3
08	Spain	7	15	11	18	22	19		13	
09	Estonia	24	22	25	25	23	25		15	
10	Ireland	17	4	20	7	21	12		7	4
11	Latvia	18	20	21	23	10	23		11	
12	Greece	22	6	10	24	16	18		14	
13	United Kingdom	5	3	17	2	8	3	8	20	
14	Norway	14	13	22	13	20	20		12	
15	Italy	12	7	2	10	3	4	7	10	1
16	Serbia	19	23	18	22	19	24		19	
17	Finland	11	12	6	8	12	11		6	5
18	Portugal	23	21	3	19	2	7	4	23	
19	Armenia	20	5	12	16	9	14		9	2
20	Cyprus	10	9	14	3	15	9	2	18	
21	Switzerland	6	1	1	1	5	1	12	4	7
22	Slovenia	21	10	16	21	25	22		24	
23	Croatia	1	2	13	9	11	2	10	2	10
24	Georgia	25	11	19	17	14	21		22	
25	France	13	8	5	20	1	6	5	5	6
26	Austria	2	19	15	11	13	10	1	17	
