= Wildfire (Loreen album) =

- Standard cover

Studio album by Loreen
- Released: 27 March 2026
- Length: 38:51
- Label: Polydor
- Producers: Myles Avery; Peter Boström; Fat Max Gsus; Thomas G:son; Joe Housley; Jimmy Jansson; Koz; Charlie Martin; Oliver Petehof; Jesse Shatkin; Jon Shave; Kyle Shearer; TMS; Rami Yacoub

Loreen chronology
Sages (2025)	Wildfire (2026)

Singles from Wildfire
- 1. "Feels Like Heaven" Released: 23 January 2026; 2. "Wildfire" Released: 26 February 2026; 3. "Coming Close" Released: 20 March 2026; 4. "True Love" Released: April 2026

Wildfire (stylised in all caps) is the third studio album by the Swedish singer Loreen, released on 27 March 2026, through Polydor Records. It is her first album release since Ride (2017). The album was preceded by three singles: "Feels Like Heaven", "Wildfire", and "Coming Close". Wildfire also features the Eurovision Song Contest 2023 winning song "Tattoo" and its follow-up, "Is It Love".

== Promotion ==
Wildfire was first teased on social media with an image of morse code indicating Loreen's return. Subsequent posts referred to locations around European cities including London, Paris, and Berlin. On 20 January 2026, digital projections showing Loreen on fire were shown at these specific locations. A day later, the album was announced and its pre-orders became available with three cover variants "Day", "Dusk" and "Midnight".

Later that week, "Feels Like Heaven" was announced as the first single from the album and was released on 23 January 2026. On 24 January, Loreen appeared on Star Academy and performed both "Tattoo" with one of the contestants and "Feels Like Heaven". On 2 February, a music video for "Feels Like Heaven" directed by Neels Castillon was released on streaming platforms. That same month, the Wildfire Tour was announced in support the album's release. The album's third single, "Coming Close", was released on 20 March 2026, with its music video published on YouTube six days later.

== Track listing ==
Wildfire track listing
No.	Title	Writer(s)	Producer(s)	Length
1.	"Where Do We Go from Here"	Lorine Zineb Nora Talhaoui; Kyle Shearer; Nate Campany; Jesse St. John	Shearer; Calum Laundau^{[avp]}	3:21
2.	"Feels Like Heaven"	Talhaoui; Jesse Shatkin; Landau; Sia Furler	Shatkin; Myles Avery; Laundau^{[avp]}	3:13
3.	"Weapons"	Talhaoui; Charlie Martin; Joe Housley; Andrew Jackson	Martin; Housley; Laundau^{[avp]}	2:51
4.	"Is It Love"	Rami Yacoub; Dag Lundberg; Maia Wright; Talhaoui	Yacoub; Albin Nedler^{[v]}	2:23
5.	"Can't Pull Me Down"	Talhaoui; Tom Hollings; Sam Brennan; Grace Barker; Bill Maybury	Hollings; Brennan; Laundau^{[avp]}	2:21
6.	"Melt"	Talhaoui; Oliver Petehof; Conor Blake; Boy Matthews	Petehof; Laundau^{[avp]}	2:45
7.	"Wildfire"	Talhaoui; Shearer; St. John	Shearer; Laundau^{[avp]}	3:53
8.	"Coming Close"	Talhaoui; Martin; Housley; Jackson	Martin; Housley; Laundau^{[avp]}	2:58
9.	"Set Me Free"	Talhaoui; Thomas G:son; Jimmy Jansson; Poppy Baskcomb	Jon Shave; Laundau^{[v]}	2:23
10.	"Tattoo"	Talhaoui; Peter Boström; Jansson; G:son; Jimmy Thörnfeldt; Cazzi Opeia	Boström; Jansson; G:son	3:03
11.	"Lose That Light" (featuring 6lack)	Stephen Kozmeniuk; Mikky Ekko	Koz; Laundau^{[avp]}	2:54
12.	"Kiss the Sky"	Talhaoui; Blake; Kristin Carpenter; Max Grahn	Fat Max Gsus; Laundau^{[avp]}	3:06
13.	"True Love"	Talhaoui; Tom Barnes; Pete Kelleher; Ben Kohn; Casey Smith	Samuel Starck; Laundau^{[avp]}; TMS^{[v]}	3:40
Total length:				38:51

=== Notes ===
- ^{^[avp]} denotes an additional producer and vocal producer.
- ^{^[v]} denotes a vocal producer.

== Charts ==
Chart performance
Chart (2026)	Peak position
Belgian Albums (Ultratop Flanders)	27
Belgian Albums (Ultratop Wallonia)	21
Croatian International Albums (HDU)	31
Dutch Albums (Album Top 100)	79
French Albums (SNEP)	71
French Physical Albums (SNEP)	23
German Albums (Offizielle Top 100)	34
German Pop Albums (Offizielle Top 100)	13
Polish Albums (ZPAV)	23
Polish Vinyl Albums (ZPAV)	12
Scottish Albums (Official Charts)	26
Swedish Physical Albums (Sverigetopplistan)	11
Spanish Albums (Promusicae)	70
Spanish Vinyl Albums (Promusicae)	17
UK Albums Sales (OCC)	24
UK Vinyl Albums Chart (OCC)	26

== Certifications ==
Certifications and sales
Region	Certification	Certified units/sales
Poland (ZPAV)	Gold	15,000^{‡}
^{‡} Sales+streaming figures based on certification alone.

== Release history ==
Release history
Date	Format	Label	Ref.
27 March 2026	CD; digital download; LP; streaming	Polydor	
