= Queendom (Red Velvet song) =

- Demicat remix cover

Single by Red Velvet

from the EP Queendom
- Language: Korean; English
- Released: August 16, 2021
- Genre: Dance-pop
- Length: 3:01
- Label: SM; Dreamus
- Composers: minGtion; Anne Judith Stokke Wik; Moa "Cazzi Opeia" Carlebecker; Ellen Berg
- Lyricist: Jo Yoon-kyung

Red Velvet singles chronology
"Psycho" (2019)	"Queendom" (2021)	"Feel My Rhythm" (2022)

Music video
- "Queendom" on YouTube

"Queendom" is a song recorded by South Korean girl group Red Velvet for their sixth Korean extended play (EP) of the same name. Composed by minGtion, Anne Judith Stokke Wik, Moa "Cazzi Opeia" Carlebecker, and Ellen Berg with Korean lyrics adapted by Jo Yoon-kyung, the dance-pop song was released as the titular EP's lead single on August 16, 2021, by SM Entertainment, along with its accompanying music video.

Upon its release, "Queendom" received mixed to positive receptions from critics, citing the song as an "empowering", "perfect return" of the group. It also attained commercial success, marking the group's thirteenth top-ten hit in their home country, their seventeenth top-ten entry on the Billboard World Digital Song Sales, and their first entry on the Billboard Global 200, landing at number ninety-six.

== Background and release ==
After a year and eight months, SM Entertainment confirmed through Newsen on June 9, 2021, that Red Velvet will be preparing a new album with the aim of making a comeback in August. Previously, the group released their repackaged album The ReVe Festival: Finale last December 2019 accompanied by the title track "Psycho", followed by the unit debut of Irene and Seulgi, with Wendy and Joy making their debut as solo singers. Moreover, Yeri had also built her acting career by appearing in tvN's Drama Stage 2021 - Mint Condition and the web drama, Blue Birthday. Prior to the official release of "Queendom", Red Velvet shared a snippet of their new song, alongside a preview of its choreography. The song had its official digital release on August 16, 2021, along with the extended play of the same name.

== Composition ==
"Queendom"
"Queendom" is a dance-pop and electronic song with a "bright" piano and "euphoric synthy", bass-led chorus.

"Queendom" was composed by minGtion, Anne Judith Stokke Wik, Moa "Cazzi Opeia" Carlebecker, and Ellen Berg, while the Korean lyrics were written by Jo Yoon-kyung. In a newspaper interview with The Post, Wik revealed that the writer's table for the song was four women, and called it "impressive", reasoning that the music industry is male-dominated. She stated that it was written in a "record time" since the song had that "once-in-a-lifetime flow to it". The whole session of writing and recording the song was finished for four-and-a-half hours with some post-production, with Wik adding that writing and recording of the track "happened really fast" and came out "so good". In an interview made by Vogue with Red Velvet, Wendy revealed that the group had put a lot of thought towards "expressing and showcasing" differently their "unique colors". The group had come up with an idea of storytelling three different concepts which were, "homecoming", "journey", and "carnival", while stating that listening to their song would bring their feeling of "bright and positive energy".

Musically, "Queendom" was characterized as a dance-pop song. JT Early of Beats Per Minute described the song as house-influenced, noting the "bright piano" and "euphoric synthy", bass-led chorus. Verónica Bastardo of The Quietus noted the dynamic piano synths chords, "easy-to-remember" hooks, electronic instrumentals, "glimmering" metals and airy synths. Additionally, Bastardo mentioned the big emphasis on rap sections and vocals that fall in between singing, speaking, and "actually" rapping. Kim Na-yeon of Single List acknowledged the rhythmical combination of flute and brass riffs on a "colorful" synth base, adding to the fun of listening to "addictive hooks", with "bright and colorful" vocals from Red Velvet. Tamar Herman of South China Morning Post recognized the "lusher synth styling" on which it balanced a "catchy, magical spell-like" chorus, "That's our queendom yeah/Ladida-do Ba-badida). It is composed in the key of F major, with a tempo of 120 beats per minute. Lyrically, the song conveys a message of positivity, highlighting that everyone's "unique differences" is what makes the world "so beautiful". It renders "feminist-centric" message, while also focusing on the co-existence of sisterhood and individuality. Kim Sung-yeop of IZM noted the song for thoroughly focusing on the message and sensibility, giving an example of the lyrics, "Shall we start again", as it contains an autobiographical story of moving towards a new beginning of Red Velvet. Moreover, Kim described the lyrics, "Ladida-do Ba-badida", as a track that does not "create synergy with the ambiguous concept song" and refuses to offset the plain impression of the overall melody.

== Critical reception ==
Following its initial release, "Queendom" was met with mixed to positive reviews from music critics. JT Early of Beats Per Minute described the song as "vivacious and uplifting" with its "more laid-back and magical vibe", calling it as "the perfect return track". Anton Holmes of CNN Philippines labelled the track as a "definitive Red song", while calling it a "contender" as one of the songs of 2021. Tamar Herman of South China Morning Post described the track as "bright, bubbly pop song of summer", praising the group's "empowering verses" that bounce between the group's tonality, with a welcome return to Wendy's "power vocals". Lee Jin-joo of BNT News expressed that unlike the experimental concept that Red Velvet had shown for a while, the group have "embodied their own colors" with familiar and popular music. Verónica Bastardo of The Quietus called it a "light and fun electronic club song", further adding that it would be a great track for party vibes chants. Han Su-jin of IZE magazine commented on the track's promotion of "freshness", adding that the emotions in the melody are close to subtlety. Lee Deok-haeng of StarNews outlined the "high expectations" to the song as the group had previously released "summer unbeaten hit streaks" such as, "Red Flavor" (2017), "Power Up" (2018), and "Umpah Umpah" (2019). Ana Clara Ribeiro of PopMatters praised the song for being "positive in sound and message", stating: "It doesn’t fail in its attempt to be empowering, but (thankfully) it doesn’t go out of its way to be, even if the lyrics sometimes verge on cliche". Joshua Minsoo Kim of Pitchfork commented on how the track rarely offers the quintet the chance to flaunt their vocal prowess. Rhian Daly of NME called the song the "weakest in Red Velvet's career so far", further explaining that it is "neither bad nor bold" with mention of "incredible awkward raps" that each member delivers as the verses progresses, and concluded that there's something about the song that feels a "little hollow".

== Accolades ==
Awards and nominations for "Queendom"
Ceremony	Year	Award	Result	Ref.
Asian Pop Music Awards (Note: Hosted by the Hong Kong Asia Pacific International Group and Sunway Records, the Asian Pop Music Awards bases its winners on "Asian Pop Music Chart" which opened in September 2019.)	2021	Best Dance Performance (Overseas)	Nominated	
Gaon Chart Music Awards	2022	Artist of the Year (Digital Music) – August	Won	
Golden Disc Awards	2022	Digital Song Bonsang	Nominated	
Mnet Asian Music Awards	2021	Best Dance Performance – Female Group	Nominated	
Mnet Asian Music Awards	2021	TikTok Song of the Year	Longlisted	

Music program awards for "Queendom"
Program	Date	Ref.
M Countdown	August 26, 2021	
Music Bank	August 27, 2021	
Show! Music Core	August 28, 2021	
Show! Music Core	September 4, 2021	
Show! Music Core	September 11, 2021	
Inkigayo	August 29, 2021	
Inkigayo	September 12, 2021	

Melon Popularity Award for "Queendom"
Award	Date	Ref.
Weekly Popularity Award	August 30, 2021	
Weekly Popularity Award	September 6, 2021	
Weekly Popularity Award	September 13, 2021	
Weekly Popularity Award	September 20, 2021	
Weekly Popularity Award	September 27, 2021	

== Commercial performance ==
"Queendom" debuted at number six on South Korea's Gaon Digital Chart with chart issue dated August 15–21, 2021. The song then ascended to number five during the chart issue dated August 29 – September 4, 2021. The single debuted at number 22 on Billboard's K-pop Hot 100 in the chart issue dated August 28, 2021. The song then ascended to number 8 in the chart issue dated September 4, 2021, before peaking at number 7 a week later. In Japan, the song debuted at number 77 on Billboard Japan Hot 100 in the chart issue dated August 25, 2021. In Singapore, the single debuted at number 25 on the Streaming Chart, later peaking at number 12. It also debuted at number 12 on the Regional Chart before peaking at number four. In the United States, the single debuted at number 10 on the Billboard World Digital Song Sales. The single went on to debut at number 96 on the Billboard Global 200 in the chart issue dated August 28, 2021. It also debuted at number 63 on the Billboard Global Excl. US chart.

== Music video ==
=== Background ===
The music video is set in a Alice In Wonderland-esque world taking Red Velvet across different realms.

On August 13, 2021, a 27-second video teaser for "Queendom" was uploaded on the official SM Town channel, with the official video being released three days later. The visual was released on SM Entertainment's official YouTube channel on August 16, 2021, to coincide with the digital release of Queendom. In an interview with the hairstylist of Red Velvet, Yoon Seo-ha revealed that Lee Soo-man visited the set of the music video. Yoon disclosed that Lee pointed out every details such as the direction in which Seulgi's side hair falls in the scene where she is riding her golf cart.

=== Synopsis and reception ===
The music video for "Queendom" is set in a "blindingly vibrant" Alice In Wonderland-esque world with a series of magical corridors taking Red Velvet across different realms. It starts on a magic-like pattern carved manhole cover, where a man passing over suddenly drops his AirPods into the group's world. The group then travelled through the clouds to a land with grass fields, where they had a tea party. The visual concluded with the group in a celestial setting against a starry backdrop for their final message of "unity in diversity". Following the visual's release, writer Gladys Yeo of NME described it as a "whimsical, colourful new" music video. Divyansha Dongre of Rolling Stone India noted the visual for its "vivid, animated" cinematography. Michele Mendez of Elite Daily mentioned the "bright and colorful" scene of the visual, along with its "mesmerizing" choreography. Natasha Ho of South China Morning Post's Young Post pointed out the music video's modern take of Alice in Wonderland that meets Harry Potter. Rappler labelled the visual concept as "whimsical" highlighting Red Velvet's "refreshing vocals".

== Promotion and live performances ==
On August 12, 2021, Red Velvet appeared on the YouTube channel, Civilization Express - MMTG, for their comeback special along with MC Jaejae, where they performed "Queendom" for the first time. On August 20, the group had their first music show performance on Music Bank. As part of Queendom's promotions, the song was also performed live during their promotion week on both Show! Music Core and Inkigayo. On August 26, the group performed on M Countdown, where they also performed "Pose".

== Demicat remix version ==
On October 12, 2021, it was announced that a remix version of "Queendom" will be released as a single titled, iScreaM Vol.11 : Queendom Remix. It was stated that DJ and producer Demicat will be the one working on the remix of the song. Additionally, it will be reinterpreted using the sounds of various genres such as dub, slap house, and trap. On October 14, a 29-second music video teaser for the remix version was uploaded on the official SM Town channel. The single was released on October 15 along with the music video. "Queendom (Demicat Remix)" debuted at number 100 on South Korea's Gaon Digital Chart with chart issue dated October 10–16.

== Track listing ==
- Digital download / streaming – Original version
1. "Queendom" – 3:01
- Digital download / streaming – Demicat remix version
1. "Queendom (Demicat Remix)" – 3:14

== Credits and personnel ==
Credits adapted from the liner notes of Queendom.

Studio

- SM Big Shot Studio – recording, engineered for mix
- SM Yellow Tail Studio – recording
- SM Blue Cup Studio – mixing

Personnel

- Red Velvet (Irene, Seulgi, Wendy, Joy, Yeri) – vocals, background vocals
- Jo Yoon-kyung – Korean lyrics
- minGtion – composition, arrangement, directing, bass, piano, synthesizer, digital editing
- Anne Judith Stokke Wik – composition, background vocals
- Moa "Cazzi Opeia" Carlebecker – composition, background vocals
- Ellen Berg – composition, background vocals
- Lee Min-kyu – recording, mixing engineer
- Noh Min-ji – recording
- Jeong Eui-seok – mixing

== Charts ==
=== Weekly charts ===
Weekly chart performance
Chart (2021)	Peak position
Global 200 (Billboard)	96
Japan (Japan Hot 100)	77
Singapore (RIAS)	12
South Korea (Gaon)	5
South Korea (K-pop Hot 100)	7
US World Digital Song Sales (Billboard)	10

=== Monthly charts ===
Monthly chart performance
Chart (September 2021)	Position
South Korea (Gaon)	8
South Korea (K-pop Hot 100)	7

=== Year-end charts ===
Year-end chart performance
Chart (2021)	Position
South Korea (Gaon)	87
Chart (2022)	Position
South Korea (Circle)	157

== Release history ==
Release dates and formats
Region	Date	Format(s)	Version	Label(s)	Ref.
Various	August 16, 2021	Digital download; streaming	Original	SM; Dreamus	
Various	October 15, 2021	Digital download; streaming	Demicat remix	SM; Dreamus; ScreaM	

== See also ==
- List of M Countdown Chart winners (2021)
- List of Music Bank Chart winners (2021)
- List of Show! Music Core Chart winners (2021)
- List of Inkigayo Chart winners (2021)
