= Pose (Red Velvet song) =

Song by Red Velvet

from the EP Queendom
- Language: Korean
- Released: August 16, 2021
- Studio: doobdoob Studio
- Genre: Dance-pop
- Length: 3:20
- Label: SM; Dreamus
- Composers: Fabian Torsson; Harry Sommerdahl; Ylva Dimberg; Moa "Cazzi Opeia" Carlebecker
- Lyricist: Lee Seu-ran

Audio video
- "Pose" on YouTube

"Pose" is a song recorded by South Korean girl group Red Velvet for their sixth Korean extended play (EP), Queendom. It was released as part of the EP on August 16, 2021, by SM Entertainment. The up-tempo dance-pop song is written by Lee Seu-ran and composed by Fabian Torsson, Harry Sommerdahl, Ylva Dimberg, and Moa "Cazzi Opeia" Carlebecker.

== Background and release ==
On June 9, 2021, SM Entertainment announced that Red Velvet will be making a comeback in August after a year and eight months and is preparing for a new album. On August 2, it was reported that the group will be releasing their new extended play (EP), Queendom on August 16 digitally. On August 10, it was reported that the group will be presenting an "energetic music" with the song "Pose" in the EP. Additionally, it was outlined that the track will be a combination of "confident lyrics" and "lively vocals from Red Velvet" that can give an "exciting atmosphere". The song was official release on August 16, 2021, along with the EP.

== Composition ==
"Pose"
"Pose" is an uptempo dance-pop song with "impressive, energetic" bass line, "fast-paced" deep keyboard, and military-esque drumming.

"Pose" was composed by Fabian Torsson, Harry Sommerdahl, Ylva Dimberg, and Moa "Cazzi Opeia" Carlebecker, while the lyrics were written by Lee Seu-ran. Musically, the song was described as an up-tempo dance-pop song with an "impressive, energetic" bass line and "fast-changing" drum source. JT Early of Beats Per Minute noted the "fast-paced deep keyboard to an R&B pre-chorus underlined by military-esque drumming". Kim Sung-yeop of IZM described the song that it "depicts dynamic variations based on ethnic sound" when comparing the B-side of previous releases. Rhian Daly of NME described the marching drum beat of the track as "reminiscent of Beyoncé's "Run the World (Girls) (2011)". Ana Clara Ribeiro of PopMatters commented on how it "echoes a bit of Madonna's "Vogue" (1990) in attitude" and lyrical references of "strike a pose" from the song, with additional statement on how Yeri "raps over beats in the style of Miami bass hip-hop". Verónica Bastardo of The Quietus mentioned the drastic switch from Madonna Vogue house-pop with a thick bass line to a power-drum instrumental similar to a carnival march band. The song was composed in the key of B-flat minor, with a tempo of 125 beats per minute. Lyrically, the song projects a message of "treating the world like an imaginary runway", while also being unstoppable. It also tells people to be the "main character of their own lives" and "not care about what others may think of them".

== Promotion and reception ==
On August 16, 2021, Red Velvet held an online fan meeting "inteRView Vol.7 : Queendom" on V Live's Beyond Live channel, hosted by Jaejae. The group performed "Pose" along with "Hello, Sunset" (2021), as well as "Psycho" (2019) and a medley stage of their summer songs, "Red Flavor" (2017), "Power Up" (2018), and "Umpah Umpah" (2019).

Following its initial release, "Pose" was met with positive reviews from music critics. JT Early of Beats Per Minute described it as a "propulsive and clubby track", while calling it as a song that is "appropriately designed for the runway and radiates confidence". Heran Mamo of Billboard magazine labelled the track as a "fashion-forward essence on the braggadocious runway anthem". Anton Holmes of CNN Philippines compared the song to "Red Dress" (2015) and "Look" (2017), calling it a "record named after royalty". Rhian Daly of NME stated that the track "breaks free to carve its own space as a rush of poised, confident dance-pop" as the group sings in unison, further outlining it for being free of "girlboss culture terminology" which ends up "feeling far more empowering than the title song". Ana Clara Ribeiro of PopMatters described the song as a "different type of feel-good song than "Queendom" (2021)", explaining that it is more "intriguing" and has a "playful, quirkier side". Joshua Minsoo Kim of Pitchfork noted the track's similarity to f(x) verses and Itzy synths, commenting that it "convinces you of its poise despite the tepid energy level". Verónica Bastardo of The Quietus commented that the song is "closer to what you might expect from a Red Velvet record", citing the "intricate mix of sections that seem taken from different songs". The song was included on Teen Vogue's The 54 Best K-Pop Songs of 2021 list, where Anton Rohr described the song as "vivacious, magnetic, and zesty", serving as an "uptempo anthem for the girls and gays in addition to an exuberant return" of Red Velvet.

== Commercial performance ==
"Pose" debuted at position 105 on South Korea's Gaon Digital Chart in the chart issue dated August 15–21, 2021. It debuted at position 90 on Billboard K-pop Hot 100 in the chart issue dated August 28, 2021. The song then ascended to position 81 in the chart issue dated September 4, 2021.

== Credits and personnel ==
Credits adapted from the liner notes of Queendom.

Studio

- doobdoob Studio – recording
- SM Yellow Tail Studio – editing, engineered for mix
- SM Concert Hall Studio – mixing

Personnel

- Red Velvet (Irene, Seulgi, Wendy, Joy, Yeri) – vocals, background vocals
- Lee Seu-ran – lyrics
- Fabian Torsson – composition, arrangement
- Harry Sommerdahl – composition, arrangement
- Ylva Dimberg – composition, arrangement, background vocals
- Moa "Cazzi Opeia" Carlebecker – composition, arrangement, background vocals
- Kriz – vocal directing
- Kwon Yu-jin – recording
- Noh Min-ji – digital editing, mixing engineer
- Namkoong Jin – mixing

== Charts ==
Weekly chart performance for "Pose"
Chart (2021)	Peak position
South Korea (Gaon)	105
South Korea (K-pop Hot 100)	81

== Release history ==
Release dates and formats for "Pose"
Region	Date	Format(s)	Label(s)	Ref.
Various	August 16, 2021	Digital download; streaming	SM; Dreamus	
