= Queendom (EP) =

- Digital cover

EP by Red Velvet
- Released: August 16, 2021
- Studios: SM Studios (Seoul, South Korea)
- Genres: Dance-pop; R&B; soul
- Length: 19:34
- Languages: Korean; English
- Labels: SM; Dreamus

Red Velvet chronology
| The ReVe Festival: Finale (2019) | Queendom (2021) | The ReVe Festival 2022 – Feel My Rhythm (2022) |

Singles from Queendom
- 1. "Queendom" Released: August 16, 2021

Queendom is the sixth Korean extended play and twelfth overall by South Korean girl group Red Velvet. Marketed as the group's sixth "mini album" release, it consists of six tracks, including the lead single of the same name. The EP was released digitally by SM Entertainment on August 16, 2021, and physically on August 17, 2021.

== Background and release ==
On June 9, 2021, SM Entertainment announced that Red Velvet would be making their comeback in August with a new album. From July 26 to August 1, Red Velvet held a promotional event titled "Queens Mystic General Store" through their Instagram account leading up to their seventh debut anniversary and anticipated comeback. The promotional event showcased props used in their previous music videos, and was intended to heighten the anticipation for the announcement of their comeback and release of their promotional schedule. On August 2, it was announced that Red Velvet would be releasing their sixth extended play titled Queendom, containing six tracks. The extended play is marketed by SM Entertainment as the group's sixth "mini album". On August 3, the promotional schedule for their comeback was released, which included concept photos, promotional posters, and a teaser of the upcoming music video for the title track "Queendom". The EP was released digitally on August 16, and physically the following day.

== Composition ==
Queendom consists of six songs and incorporates various genres such as dance-pop, R&B, and soul. The title track "Queendom" was described as a dance-pop song with a "refreshing atmosphere". The B-side track "Pose" was described as an "up-tempo pop dance" song with an "impressive energetic bass line" and "fast-changing drum". "Knock on Wood" was musically described as a "fairytale-like electro-punk" song with lyrics that detail the "hope to get someone to like you" as well as "the act of knocking on wood for good luck". "Better Be" was called a "witty R&B pop" song characterized by Red Velvet's "dreamy vocals and rich harmonies" and lyrically described as "not giving up easily to the person you like". "Pushin' N Pullin" was described as a "medium-tempo pop R&B" song with a "friendly and gentle message" and lyrics that "tell us to trust in the time we spent together with the person who is pushed with anxiety in [a] relationship". "Hello, Sunset" is a "slow-tempo R&B ballad" that "creates a late summer sensibility", characterized by a "subtle drum rhythm, refreshing electric guitar, and dreamy piano performance" and lyrics about a "confession" of being together with loved ones.

== Critical reception ==
Professional ratings
Aggregate scores
| Source | Rating |
|---|---|
| AnyDecentMusic? | 6.7/10 |
| Metacritic | 74/100 |
Review scores
| Source | Rating |
| Beats Per Minute | 80% |
| IZM | 2.5/5 stars |
| NME | 3/5 stars |
| Pitchfork | 6.7/10 |
| PopMatters | 8/10 |

Upon its release, Queendom received positive reviews from music critics. On Metacritic, which assigns a normalized score out of 100 to ratings from publications, the album received a mean score of 74 based on 5 reviews, indicating "generally favorable reviews".

Rhian Daly from NME described the EP as "playing it safe; cautiously dipping a toe back in the water rather than making a big splash to signal their return". Joshua Minsoo Kim writing for Pitchfork called the EP "perfectly adequate, but the release itself never reaches the group's former heights" and "doesn't overflow with excellence". He further added that the title track "rarely offers the quintet the chance to flaunt their vocal prowess", feeling it is "too low-key" and "frustratingly one-dimensional" while labelling other songs on the EP "similarly unambitious, but a couple of its other songs at least have everything in order". Overall, he stated the EP "both falters and thrives in simplicity" and gave it a score of 6.7 out of 10.

Ana Clara Ribeiro from PopMatters described the EP as crème brûlée, comparing the dessert's "simplicity and accessibility in its taste" to Red Velvet's music. Overall, she stated the EP "not all songs from Queendom will be most listened by the fans, and it's not because any of these songs are poor" while explaining that we "don't eat dessert because we need basic nutrients for our body" but because we want to "taste something delicious and Queendom tastes delicious". JT Early from Beats Per Minute described the EP as "an all-killer summer project exploring the themes of empowerment, romance and its accompanying obstacles". and stated the EP "ticks all the boxes that fans would want" and has "great replay value".

=== Year-end lists ===
Queendom on year-end lists
| Critic/Publication | List | Rank | Ref. |
|---|---|---|---|
| PopMatters | Top 20 Best K-pop Albums of 2021 | 14 | |

== Commercial performance ==
In South Korea, the EP debuted at number 2 on the Gaon Album Chart in the chart issue dated August 15–21, 2021. In the United Kingdom, the EP debuted at number 17 on the UK Digital Albums in the chart issue dated August 20, 2021. In Japan, the EP debuted at number 41 on Billboard Japan Hot Albums in the chart issue dated August 25, 2021. In the United States, the EP debuted at number 16 and 11 on Billboard's Heatseekers Albums and World Albums chart, respectively, in the chart issue dated August 28, 2021.

== Accolades ==
Awards and nominations for Queendom
| Ceremony | Year | Award | Result | Ref. |
|---|---|---|---|---|
| Asian Pop Music Awards (Note: Hosted by the Hong Kong Asia Pacific International Group and Sunway Records, the Asian Pop Music Awards bases its winners on "Asian Pop Music Chart" which opened in September 2019.) | 2021 | Best Album of the Year (Overseas) | Nominated | |
| Golden Disc Awards | 2022 | Album Bonsang | Nominated | |

== Track listing ==
Queendom track listing
| No. | Title | Lyrics | Music | Arrangement | Length |
|---|---|---|---|---|---|
| 1. | "Queendom" | Jo Yoon-kyung | MinGtion; Anne Judith Stokke Wik; Moa "Cazzi Opeia" Carlebecker; Ellen Berg | MinGtion | 3:01 |
| 2. | "Pose" | Lee Seu-ran | Fabian Torsson; Harry Sommerdahl; Ylva Dimberg; Moa "Cazzi Opeia" Carlebecker | Bangers & Ca$h; Ylva Dimberg; Moa "Cazzi Opeia" Carlebecker | 3:20 |
| 3. | "Knock on Wood" | Seo Ji-eum | Jonatan Gusmark; Ludvig Evers; Moa "Cazzi Opeia" Carlebecker; Ellen Berg | Moonshine | 3:40 |
| 4. | "Better Be" | Kim In-hyung (Jam Factory) | Andreas Öberg; Skylar Mones; Michele Wylen | Skylar Mones; Andreas Öberg | 3:00 |
| 5. | "Pushin' N Pullin" | Kenzie | Kenzie; Mike Daley; Mitchell Owens; Nicole Cohen | Mike Daley; Mitchell Owens | 3:03 |
| 6. | "Hello, Sunset" (다시 여름; Dasi Yeoreum; lit. 'Again, Summer') | Choi Bo-ra (153/Joombas) | Sam Klempner; Noémie Legrand; Dewain Whitmore Jr. | Sam Klempner | 3:30 |
| Total length: | | | | | 19:34 |

== Personnel ==
Credits adapted from the liner notes of the EP.

Musicians

- Red Velvet (Irene, Seulgi, Wendy, Joy, Yeri) – vocals (all tracks), background vocals (all tracks)
- Jo Yoon-kyung – Korean lyrics (track 1)
- Lee Seu-ran – Korean lyrics (track 2)
- Seo Ji-eum – Korean lyrics (track 3)
- Kim In-hyeong (Jam Factory) – Korean lyrics (track 4)
- Kenzie – Korean lyrics (track 5), background vocals (track 5)
- Choi Bo-ra (153/Joombas) – Korean lyrics (track 6)
- MinGtion – composition (track 1), arrangement (track 1), bass (track 1), piano (track 1), synthesizer (track 1)
- Anne Judith Stokke Wik – composition (track 1), background vocals (track 1)
- Moa "Cazzi Opeia" Carlebecker – composition (tracks 1–3), arrangement (track 2), background vocals (tracks 1–3)
- Ellen Berg – composition (tracks 1, 3), background vocals (tracks 1, 3)
- Fabian Torsson (Bangers & Ca$h) – composition (track 2), arrangement (track 2)
- Harry Sommerdahl (Bangers & Ca$h) – composition (track 2), arrangement (track 2)
- Ylva Dimberg – composition (track 2), arrangement (track 2), background vocals (track 2)
- Moonshine – composition (track 3), arrangement (track 3)
- Andreas Öberg – composition (track 4), arrangement (track 4)
- Skylar Mones – composition (track 4), arrangement (track 4)
- Michele Wylen – composition (track 4)
- Mike Daley – composition (track 5), arrangement (track 5)
- Mitchell Owens – composition (track 5), arrangement (track 5)
- Nicole Cohen – composition (track 5)
- Sam Klempner – composition (track 6), arrangement (track 6)
- Noémie Legrand – composition (track 6)
- Dewain Whitmore Jr. – composition (track 6)
- Mike Park – drum (track 6)

Technical

- MinGtion – directing (track 1), digital editing (track 1)
- Kriz – vocal directing (track 2)
- Seo Mi-rae (ButterFly) – vocal directing (track 3), Pro Tools operation (track 3)
- Kim Yeon-seo – vocal directing (track 4)
- Kenzie – directing (track 5)
- Chu Dae-gwan – vocal directing (track 6)
- Lee Min-kyu – recording (track 1), mixing engineer (tracks 1, 3), mixing (track 3)
- Noh Min-ji – recording (track 1), digital editing (track 2), mixing engineer (tracks 2, 5)
- Kwon Yu-jin – recording (track 2), digital editing (track 3)
- Lee Jeong-bin – recording (track 3)
- Kim Chul-soon – recording (track 4), mixing (track 4)
- Jeong Eui-seok – recording (track 5), digital editing (track 5), mixing (tracks 1, 5)
- Kang Sun-young – recording (track 6)
- Jung Yoo-ra – digital editing (tracks 4–5)
- Ahn Chang-kyu – digital editing (track 6)
- Kang Eun-ji – mixing engineer (tracks 4, 6)
- Namkoong Jin – mixing (track 2)
- Lee Ji-hong – mixing (track 6)

== Charts ==
=== Weekly charts ===
Weekly chart performance for Queendom
| Chart (2021) | Peak position |
|---|---|
| Australian Digital Albums (ARIA) | 17 |
| Belgian Albums (Ultratop Flanders) | 143 |
| Finnish Physical Albums (Suomen virallinen lista) | 8 |
| Japan Hot Albums (Billboard Japan) | 23 |
| Japanese Albums (Oricon) | 11 |
| South Korean Albums (Gaon) | 2 |
| UK Digital Albums (OCC) | 17 |
| US Heatseekers Albums (Billboard) | 16 |
| US World Albums (Billboard) | 11 |

=== Monthly charts ===
Chart performance for Queendom
| Chart (2021) | Peak position |
|---|---|
| Japanese Albums (Oricon) | 33 |
| South Korean Albums (Gaon) | 4 |

=== Year-end charts ===
Year-end chart performance for Queendom
| Chart (2021) | Position |
|---|---|
| South Korean Albums (Gaon) | 37 |

== Certifications and sales ==
Certifications and sales for Queendom
| Region | Certification | Certified units/sales |
|---|---|---|
| Japan | — | 12,452 (Phy.) |
| South Korea (KMCA) | Platinum | 363,602 |

== Release history ==
Release history for Queendom
| Region | Date | Format | Label |
|---|---|---|---|
| Various | August 16, 2021 | Digital download; streaming | SM; Dreamus |
| South Korea | August 17, 2021 | CD | SM; Dreamus |
