= Is It Love (Loreen song) =

Single by Loreen
- Released: 13 October 2023
- Length: 2:23
- Label: Universal
- Songwriters: Loren Talhaoui; Rami Yacoub; Dag Lundberg; MTHR; Maia Wright
- Producer: Rami Yacoub

Loreen singles chronology
"Tattoo" (2023)	"Is It Love" (2023)	"Forever" (2024)

Music video
- "Is It Love" on YouTube

"Is It Love" is a song by Swedish pop singer Loreen. It was released on 13 October 2023, through Universal Music Sweden. Follow-up single after her second Eurovision Song Contest victory, the song was written by Loreen, Dag Lundberg, MTHR and Maia Wright and produced by Rami Yacoub. The song was later included on Loreen's third studio album, Wildfire (2026).

== Music video ==
An accompanying music video for "Is It Love", directed by Moncef Henaien, was released on 26 October 2023 and was shot in Tunisia.

== Charts ==
=== Weekly charts ===
Weekly chart performance
Chart (2023–2024)	Peak position
Belarus Airplay (TopHit)	120
Belgium (Ultratop 50 Flanders)	7
Belgium (Ultratop 50 Wallonia)	6
CIS Airplay (TopHit)	65
Croatia International Airplay (Top lista)	22
France (SNEP)	43
Greece International (IFPI)	20
Lithuania Airplay (TopHit)	42
Netherlands (Dutch Top 40)	6
Netherlands (Single Top 100)	33
Norway (VG-lista)	34
Poland (Polish Airplay Top 100)	3
Romania Airplay (TopHit)	155
Russia Airplay (TopHit)	94
Slovakia Airplay (ČNS IFPI)	6
Spain (Promusicae)	35
Sweden (Sverigetopplistan)	13
UK Singles Sales (OCC)	32

=== Monthly charts ===
Monthly chart performance
Chart (2023–2024)	Peak position
Lithuania Airplay (TopHit)	86
Slovakia (Rádio Top 100)	6

=== Year-end charts ===
Year-end chart performance
Chart (2024)	Position
Belgium (Ultratop 50 Flanders)	56
Belgium (Ultratop 50 Wallonia)	46
France (SNEP)	173
Netherlands (Dutch Top 40)	47

== Certifications ==
Certifications and sales
Region	Certification	Certified units/sales
Belgium (BRMA)	Gold	20,000^{‡}
France (SNEP)	Platinum	200,000^{‡}
Poland (ZPAV)	Gold	25,000^{‡}
^{‡} Sales+streaming figures based on certification alone.
