= Hunter (Key album) =

- Digital cover

Studio album by Key
- Released: August 11, 2025
- Genre: K-pop
- Length: 29:45
- Languages: Korean; English
- Label: SM

Key chronology
Pleasure Shop (2024)	Hunter (2025)

Singles from Hunter
- 1. "Hunter" Released: August 11, 2025

Hunter is the third studio album by South Korean singer Key. It was released on August 11, 2025, through SM Entertainment. It consists of ten songs of different genres, including the lead single, "Hunter", and is themed around urban legends. It peaked at number three on South Korea's Circle Album Chart.

== Background ==
Key's second studio album, Gasoline, was released in 2022. Follow-up releases Good & Great (2023) and Pleasure Shop (2024) featured songs with a milder sound in order to show variety. However, Key found this less fulfilling and decided to return to making more conceptual music, stating: "I wanted to go back to what I really want to do, and this is it. It is something I had been putting off for a long time." He decided to release a studio album as a gift for fans, and selected the songs with performing in mind. The concept was inspired by horror films and urban legends like the jangsanbeom. It features collaborations with Eunho of Plave and Seulgi of Red Velvet. Key said the album had no connection to the Netflix animated film KPop Demon Hunters and that he had already filmed the music video before it was released.

== Composition ==
Hunter contains ten songs of various genres, and is described as "an album that weaves a variety of stories about the self". It opens with lead single "Hunter", a dance song that describes a complex and obsessive relationship. It features bass, kick sounds, rhythmic guitar riffs and synth pads. "Trap" incorporates "aggressive" drums, a "tense" bass rhythm, "rough electronic edges" and bell sounds. The lyrics depict a nightmarish existence that constantly provokes self-doubt. It is followed by "Strange", Key's signature English track, an experimental punk rock song with textured synths and distorted vocals that asks questions about the inner lives of humans. "Want Another" is a dance-pop song about awakening hidden desires. It combines "choppy vocals" and "metallic synths" with an "off-kilter song structure". "No Way!" blends R&B and house, with lyrics about fighting back against the different voices inside one's head. "Infatuation" is a synth-infused new jack swing track about a summer fling. "Glam" is a retro dance-pop song with synths and kick sounds. It portrays Key enjoying his life and celebrating himself. "Picture Frame" is a house-inflected dance song with glitchy vocals and "dreamy" synths. It compares the border between reality and dreams to a picture frame. R&B pop track "Perfect Error" contains guitar riffs and synths, with a message about self-belief. Finally, "Lavender Love" is a pop song with "dreamy" synths and "emotional" vocals. The lyrics express gratitude for a person who has been a source of strength.

== Release and promotion ==
On July 21, 2025, SM Entertainment announced that Key was planning to release his third studio album the following month. They uploaded images of a mock noticeboard online containing a phone number fans could call to learn more about the album. Key launched a website containing hints about the album and uploaded promotional imagery to social media depicting the horror theme. Between August 5 and August 10, he held an event titled Dr. Odd's Room, where fans could visit the secret office of "Dr. Odd", a character who collects ghost stories, and view objects shown in the album artwork. Key performed lead single "Hunter" for the first time at SM Town Live in Japan on August 9. The album was released on August 11, alongside the music video for the lead single. Key performed "Hunter" on music programs, beginning with M Countdown on August 14. He received two music show wins for "Hunter", marking the first time he had done so as a solo artist. Key commented: "I hoped this album would be a gift to my fans, but I feel like my fans have given me a gift instead. I know full well that winning first place on a music show at my age is by no means an easy feat, so I'm even more grateful." He promoted the album with a concert tour, titled 2025 Keyland: Uncanny Valley, beginning with shows in Seoul in September. On October 2, he held a fan meeting, hosted by music streaming service Melon, for his subscribers on the platform.

== Critical reception ==
In a five-star review, Carmen Chin of NME lauded the album's "incredibly taut and cohesive artistic vision". She felt that it was one of the best Korean releases of the year, and stated that Key made "a strong argument for his case as the next pop disruptor".

== Accolades ==
Music program awards
Song	Program	Date	Ref.
"Hunter"	Show Champion	August 20, 2025	
"Hunter"	Music Bank	August 22, 2025	

== Track listing ==
Hunter track listing
No.	Title	Lyrics	Music	Arrangement	Length
1.	"Hunter"	Kenzie	Kenzie; Jonatan Gusmark; Ludvig Evers; Cazzi Opeia; Adrian McKinnon	Moonshine; Kenzie	2:43
2.	"Trap"	Danke	Johan Fransson; Gavin Jones; Henrik Goranson	Johan Fransson; Henrik Goranson	2:38
3.	"Strange"	Dan Gleyzer; Christina Galligan; Jae Park; Bas van Daalen	Dan Gleyzer; Christina Galligan; Jae Park; Bas van Daalen	Dan Gleyzer; Bas van Daalen	3:14
4.	"Want Another"	Jeon Gan-di	Adrijana; Pontus Kalm; Jakob Lindell	Pontus "Oneye" Kalm; Ike	2:30
5.	"No Way!"	Jeon Gan-di	Jack Brady; Jordan Roman; Ben Free; Stefi Novo	The Wavys	3:00
6.	"Infatuation" (featuring Eunho of Plave)	Kenzie	Kenzie; Jonatan Gusmark; Ludvig Evers; Adrian McKinnon	Moonshine; Kenzie	3:19
7.	"Glam"	Kenzie	Kenzie; Jonatan Gusmark; Ludvig Evers; Cazzi Opeia; Henrik Heaven	Moonshine; Kenzie	2:52
8.	"Picture Frame"	Bang Hye-hyun; Jo Yoon-kyung	Ryan S. Jhun; Kim Min-gu (Nine); Lee Ye-jun (Nine); Samuil (Decade+); Ido Nadjar; Kristine Bogan; Kem Tuncer	Ryan S. Jhun; Kim Min-gu; Lee Ye-jun	2:59
9.	"Perfect Error" (featuring Seulgi of Red Velvet)	Tomboy1; Xerry; Seoa; Mola	John Mars; Theo Lundestad Lawrence; Gustav Blomberg; Eva Parkmakova	John Mars	3:21
10.	"Lavender Love"	Kang Eun-yu	Ryan S. Jhun; Jack Brady; Jordan Roman; Kella Armitage; Gabe Reali	Ryan S. Jhun; The Wavys	3:09
Total length:					29:45

== Credits and personnel ==
Credits adapted from the album's liner notes.

Studio

- SM LVYIN Studio – recording (track 1, 3–6, 8–9), digital editing, engineered for mix (track 3, 6)
- SM Starlight Studio – recording (track 1–2, 6, 10), digital editing (track 1–2, 10), engineered for mix (track 1, 10), mixing (track 10)
- SM Droplet Studio – recording (track 2, 10), digital editing (track 1)
- SM Yellow Tail Studio – recording (track 4, 7–8), digital editing, engineered for mix (track 7)
- SM Azure Studio – recording (track 4, 6, 9)
- SM Big Shot Studio – recording, digital editing (track 5), engineered for mix, mixing (track 5, 9)
- Doobdoob Studio – digital editing (track 2, 4–5, 8)
- SM Blue Cup Studio – engineered for mix (track 4), mixing (track 4, 7)
- SM Blue Ocean Studio – mixing (track 1)
- KLANG Studio – mixing (track 2, 8)
- SM Concert Hall Studio – mixing (track 3, 6)
- 821 Sound – mastering (all tracks)

Personnel

- Key – vocals (all tracks), background vocals (track 7, 10)
- Eunho (Plave) – vocals (track 6)
- Seulgi (Red Velvet) – vocals (track 9)
- Kenzie – vocal directing (track 1, 7)
- Cazzi Opeia – background vocals (track 1, 7)
- Adrian McKinnon – background vocals (track 1, 6)
- Johan Fransson – background vocals (track 2)
- Dan Gleyzer – background vocals (track 3)
- Christina Galligan – background vocals (track 3)
- Jae Park – background vocals (track 3)
- Bas van Daalen – producer, lyrics, composition, arrangement (track 3)
- Jack Brady (The Wavys) – background vocals, programming (track 10)
- Jordan Roman (The Wavys) – background vocals, programming (track 10)
- Ben Free a.k.a. Ben Freedlander – background vocals (track 5)
- Henrik Heaven – background vocals (track 7)
- Ryan S. Jhun – programming (track 8, 10)
- Kim Min-gu (Nine) – programming (track 8)
- Lee Ye-jun (Nine) – programming (track 8)
- Samuil (Decade+) – background vocals (track 8)
- Kem Tuncer – background vocals (track 8)
- Theo Lundestad Lawrence – background vocals (track 9)
- Gustav Blomberg – background vocals (track 9)
- Kella Armitage – background vocals (track 10)
- Gabe Reali – background vocals (track 10)
- Andrew Choi – background vocals (track 1, 4–6, 8–9)
- Jsong – vocal directing (track 2–3, 6), background vocals (track 2)
- Ju Chan-yang (Pollen) – background vocals (track 2)
- Maxx Song – vocal directing (track 4, 8)
- Emily Yeonseo Kim – vocal directing (track 9), background vocals (track 4, 9)
- Ondine – vocal directing (track 5)
- MinGtion – vocal directing (track 10)
- Lee Ji-hong – recording (track 1, 3–6, 8–9), digital editing, engineered for mix (track 3, 6)
- Jeong Yoo-ra – recording (track 1–2, 6, 10), digital editing (track 1–2, 10), engineered for mix (track 1, 10), mixing (track 10)
- Kim Joo-hyun – recording (track 2, 10), digital editing (track 1)
- Noh Min-ji – recording (track 4, 7–8), digital editing, engineered for mix (track 7)
- Kim Jae-yeon – recording (track 4, 6, 9)
- Lee Min-kyu – recording, digital editing (track 5), engineered for mix, mixing (track 5, 9)
- Eugene Kwon – digital editing (track 2, 4, 8)
- Jang Woo-young – digital editing (track 5)
- Lee Chang-hoon – digital editing (track 9)
- Jung Eui-seok – engineered for mix (track 4), mixing (track 4, 7)
- Kim Cheol-sun – mixing (track 1)
- Koo Jong-pil – mixing (track 2, 8)
- Nam Koong-jin – mixing (track 3, 6)
- Kwon Nam-woo – mastering (all tracks)

== Charts ==
=== Weekly charts ===
Weekly chart performance for Hunter
Chart (2025)	Peak position
Japanese Albums (Oricon)	27
Japanese Digital Albums (Oricon)	5
Japanese Download Albums (Billboard Japan)	7
South Korean Albums (Circle)	3

=== Monthly charts ===
Monthly chart performance for Hunter
Chart (2025)	Position
South Korean Albums (Circle)	11
