= Pleasure Shop =

- Digital cover

EP by Key
- Released: September 23, 2024
- Genre: House
- Length: 18:17
- Languages: Korean; English
- Label: SM

Key chronology
Good & Great (2023)	Pleasure Shop (2024)	Hunter (2025)

Singles from Pleasure Shop
- 1. "Pleasure Shop" Released: September 23, 2024

Pleasure Shop is the third Korean extended play (EP) by South Korean singer Key. It was released on September 23, 2024, through SM Entertainment. The EP has a futuristic theme, and contains six songs, including the lead single, "Pleasure Shop".

== Composition ==
The EP consists of six songs belonging to the house genre. Lead single "Pleasure Shop" is an electro house song with a synth pad pattern and "danceable" drum beat. The lyrics, written by Key, depict Key as a cyborg leading people into his world. "Overthink" features repetitive synth arpeggios and rhythmic kick sounds. It compares the human brain to a virtual world, with lyrics about stopping the thoughts that won't go away. "Golden" contains youthful themes. It blends dance pop and house music, incorporating organ, synths and nylon guitar. "I Know" is a retro house song with layered bass sounds, upbeat synth chords and snap sounds. It portrays the narrator possessing the subconscious of another. "Going Up" is a funk-based pop song with rhythmic percussion and clap sounds over a strong bassline. The lyrics compare an inescapable and dangerous love to being stuck in a nightmare. Finally, "Novacaine" is an uptempo indie pop song with a drum and bass rhythm pattern. It utilises synths to evoke a "dreamy" atmosphere, with lyrics expressing longing for an ex. The song is written in English, following the tradition of Key including an English song in his albums.

== Release and promotion ==
On September 2, 2024, SM Entertainment announced that Key would release his third Korean EP, Pleasure Shop, on September 23, his birthday. Promotional content for the EP depicted Key as a cyborg inviting people to his "Pleasure Shop", where visitors could experience euphoria by drinking "pleasure juice". Key hosted a series of participatory events for fans, titled the "Pleasure Addicts Club", where they could drink the "pleasure juice" themselves. He performed songs from the EP for the first time at concerts held in Seoul on September 14–15. Key held a live event to discuss the EP on September 22, which was also broadcast through online platforms such as YouTube, TikTok and Weverse.

== Track listing ==
Pleasure Shop track listing
No.	Title	Lyrics	Music	Arrangement	Length
1.	"Pleasure Shop"	Key; Jo Yoon-kyung; Lee Hyung-suk (PNP); Park Tae-won	Anthony Pavel; Landon Sears; Jackson Morgan; Kaelyn Behr; MZMC	Styalz Fuego; MZMC	3:02
2.	"Overthink"	Hyun Ji-won; Park	David Wilson; Dewain Whitmore Jr.	Solly; Dwilly	2:59
3.	"Golden"	Park	William Leong; Benji Bae	Leong	3:08
4.	"I Know"	Jo	Mike Daley; Mitchell Owens; Bianca "Blush" Atterberry	Daley; Owens	3:25
5.	"Going Up"	Hyun	Ross James	James	2:50
6.	"Novacaine"	Ari Leff; JBach; Johnny Simpson	Leff; JBach; Simpson	Simpson	2:51
Total length:					18:17

== Personnel ==
- Key – vocals, background vocals
- Maxx Song – vocal directing (track 1)
- Andrew Choi – background vocals (tracks 1–5)
- Anthony Pavel – background vocals (track 1)
- Landon Sears – background vocals (track 1)
- Lee Ji-hong – recording (tracks 1–2, 4)
- Jeong Yu-ra – recording (track 1), digital editing (track 1), engineering for mix (tracks 1, 4), mixing (track 4)
- Jeong Eui-seok – mixing (tracks 1–2), engineering for mix (track 2)
- 1Take (Newtype) – vocal directing (tracks 2, 4)
- Dewain Whitmore Jr. – background vocals (track 2)
- Kwon Yu-jin – digital editing (tracks 2, 5)
- Ju Chan-yang (Pollen) – vocal directing (tracks 3, 5)
- Benji Bae – background vocals (track 3)
- Lee Min-gyu – recording (tracks 3–6), digital editing (tracks 3, 6), engineering for mix (track 6), mixing (track 6)
- Kang Eun-ji – recording (track 3), engineering for mix
- Gu Jong-pil – mixing (track 3), mixing in Dolby Atmos
- Jang Woo-young – digital editing (track 4)
- Emily Yeonseo Kim – background vocals (track 5), vocal directing (track 6)
- Ross James – background vocals (track 5)
- Kim Cheol-sun – mixing (track 5)
- Kwon Nam-woo – mastering

== Charts ==
=== Weekly charts ===
Weekly chart performance for Pleasure Shop
Chart (2024)	Peak position
Japanese Albums (Oricon)	21
Japanese Combined Albums (Oricon)	50
Japanese Hot Albums (Billboard Japan)	37
South Korean Albums (Circle)	6

=== Monthly charts ===
Monthly chart performance for Pleasure Shop
Chart (2024)	Peak position
South Korean Albums (Circle)	13
