= Atmos (EP) =

EP by Shinee
- Released: June 1, 2026
- Genre: K-pop
- Length: 19:51
- Languages: Korean; English
- Label: SM

Shinee chronology
Poet | Artist (2025)	Atmos (2026)

Singles from Atmos
- 1. "Atmos" Released: June 1, 2026

Atmos is the sixth Korean-language extended play (EP) by South Korean boy band Shinee. It was released on June 1, 2026, through SM Entertainment. Released to coincide with the group's 18th anniversary, it contains six songs showing their "more refined and distinctive musical color", including the lead single, "Atmos".

== Background ==
Shinee released their eighth studio album, Hard, in 2023, and single album Poet | Artist in 2025. On May 11, 2026, their agency SM Entertainment announced that they would release a new EP, titled Atmos, the following month. SM stated that while Hard aimed to show a "new form of Shinee", Atmos would contain "the most Shinee-like" music, reflecting the group's "more refined and distinctive musical color". It marks the group's 18th anniversary.

== Composition ==
The EP contains six songs of various genres. Shinee worked with longtime collaborators Kenzie and Andrew Choi on lead single "Atmos", a house-inflected electronic dance song with glitchy synths and rhythmic bass. The lyrics describe experiencing a "perfect love" through each of the five senses, comparing the sensation to floating in the air. It is followed by "Hours", a disco-inspired funk-pop track with a "groovy" bass line and half-time rhythms. The song reminisces over memories of a romance while looking ahead to times yet to come. The EP contains two electropop songs: "Possibility" and "Anti Believer". "Possibility" combines UK garage rhythms with alternative rock-style guitar. It describes finding the courage to believe in one's potential and keep moving forward. "Anti Believer" contains keyboard samples and bass, with lyrics expressing internal confusion caused by pain and doubt. The penultimate track, "Still Raining", is a "dreamy" pop R&B song that harmonises pluck synths with rhythm instruments. It compares short-lived but memorable experiences to a sudden downpour of rain. Finally, the EP concludes with "Thousand Miles Away", a midtempo ballad featuring strings and drums. It contains a hopeful message about the future while reflecting on meaningful moments of the past.

== Release and promotion ==
Atmos became available to preorder on May 11. Shinee uploaded a schedule film for their promotional content to their social media accounts, depicting the members as weathercasters. They released concept images and videos showing the group surrounded by light amidst a shower of rain. Shinee held concerts in Seoul, titled The Trilogy I – Shinee World VIII: The Invert, on May 29–31, at which they premiered songs from the EP. The EP was released on June 1.

== Track listing ==
Atmos track listing
No.	Title	Lyrics	Music	Arrangement	Length
1.	"Atmos"	Kenzie	Andrew Choi; Eldon; Rouno	Rouno	3:13
2.	"Hours"	Kenzie	Hayden Chapman; Greg Bonnick; Kenzie; Adrian McKinnon	LDN Noise	2:50
3.	"Possibility"	Lee Seu-ran	Jinbyjin; Jop Pangemanan	Jinbyjin	3:05
4.	"Anti Believer"	Park Tae-won	Elias Edman; Noak Hellsing; Cazzi Opeia; Ellen Berg; Henrik Heaven	Elias Edman	3:06
5.	"Still Raining" (소나기; Sonagi; 'Shower')	Jung Na-kyung (153/Joombas)	Fabian "Phat Fabe" Torsson; Harry Sommerdahl; August Rigo; Emily Yeonseo Kim	Bangers & Ca$h	3:15
6.	"Thousand Miles Away"	Park Tae-won	Maria Marcus; MLC; Andrew Choi	Maria Marcus	4:22
Total length:					19:51

== Charts ==
=== Weekly charts ===
Weekly chart performance for Atmos
Chart (2026)	Peak position
Japanese Albums (Oricon)	7
Japanese Combined Albums (Oricon)	7
Japanese Hot Albums (Billboard Japan)	28
South Korean Albums (Circle)	5
UK Album Downloads (Official Charts)	57

=== Monthly charts ===
Monthly chart performance for Atmos
Chart (2026)	Peak position
Japanese Albums (Oricon)	29
South Korean Albums (Circle)	18
