= Forever (Loreen song) =

Single by Loreen
- Released: 10 May 2024
- Genre: Eurodance; Europop
- Length: 3:23
- Label: Promised Land
- Songwriters: Loren Talhaoui; TMS; Boy Matthews; Zhone
- Producers: Zhone; Billen Ted

Loreen singles chronology
"Is It Love" (2023)	"Forever" (2024)	"Warning Signs" (2024)

Visualiser
- "Forever" on YouTube

"Forever" is a song by Swedish singer Loreen, released as a single on 10 May 2024, through Promised Land Recordings. The single was written by Loreen alongside British production team TMS, Boy Matthews, Conor Blake and Zhone, with the latter also producing the song with Billen Ted. The song is a torch song and ballad which incorporates EDM and Eurodance production. The song places emphasis on Loreen's vocals, set over progressively louder-growing production instrumentation. In its lyrics, she addresses her love and pleads for not wanting to be alone and having a lasting love.

"Forever" received positive reviews from music critics, who discussed it in relation to Loreen's previous music and praised her vocals and the lyrics. Loreen debuted the song at the 68th edition of the Eurovision Song Contest, where she returned as the reigning winner, after Loreen set a record the previous year at the Eurovision Song Contest 2023, in Liverpool as the only woman to win the competition twice and only second overall (behind Johnny Logan).

== Background and composition ==
Loreen made history at the Eurovision Song Contest 2023 in Liverpool after her entry "Tattoo" went on to win the contest with 583 points, earning Sweden its seventh Eurovision win and making Loreen the first woman and the second performer to have won the competition twice. Shortly after her win, Loreen returned to the studio to work on new music, with "Is It Love" issued as the follow up song to "Tattoo". Loreen decided to return to her original roots of dance music. She began looking to create something that would matter to the LGBT community. In an interview for Official Charts Company, she said it was her "gift to you [the LGBT community]". Upon speaking about her new record, Loreen was looking to create a follow-up to 2012's Heal, with "Tattoo" being the first part of the book and "Forever" serving as the second chapter. Loreen said: "Tattoo was about having a constructive way of seeing the pain in our lives, but it's necessary to have that pain so we can evolve. Who are we without struggles? So, that was the start, but the conclusion is always love. Positive energy attracts positive energy. I don't want to hear about negative attracting positive...we are not batteries! If you want to change the course of your life, you have to start thinking positive."

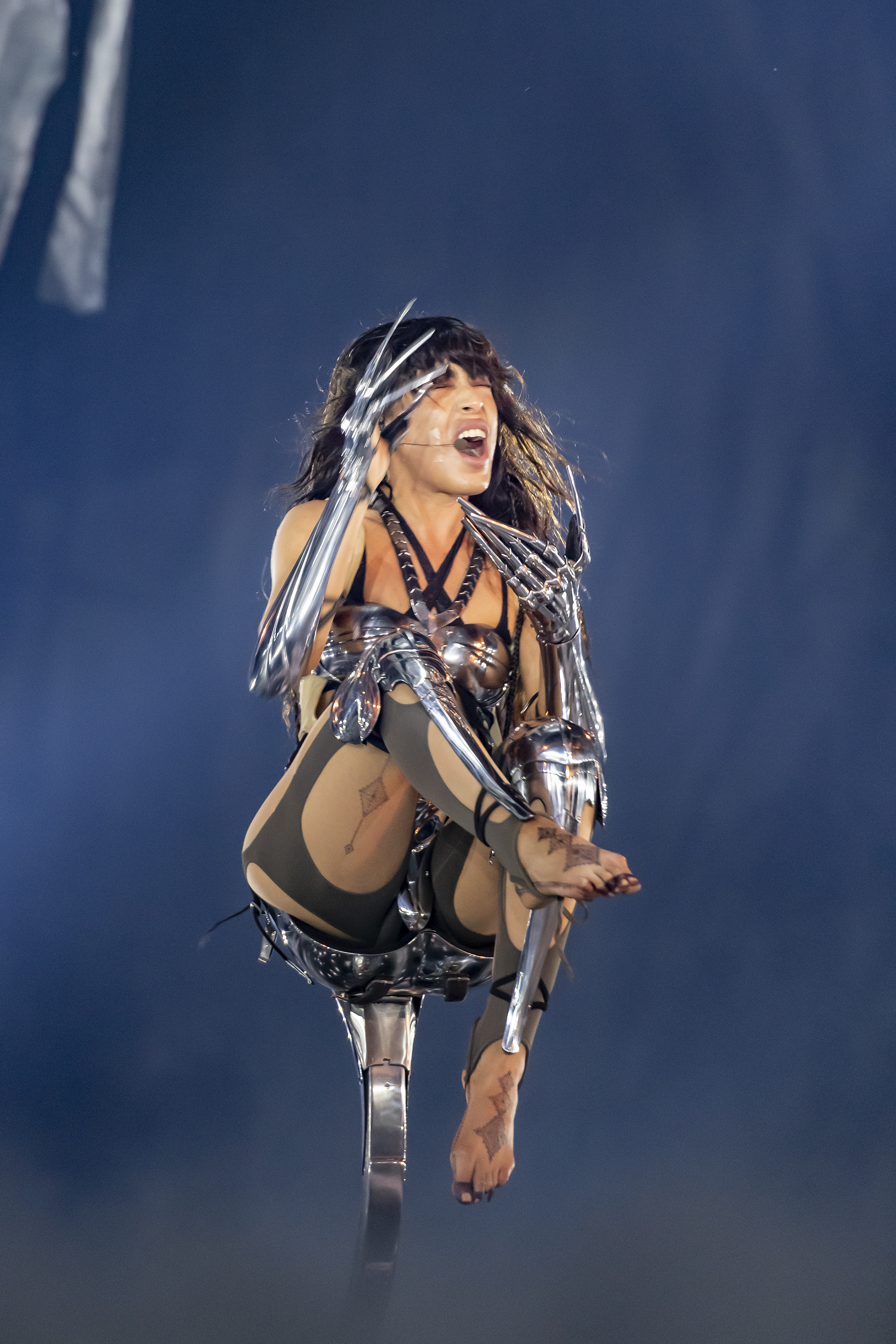
Loreen performing "Forever" at the Eurovision Song Contest 2024 in Malmö

Loreen wrote "Forever" with production team TMS, Boy Matthews and Zhone. Loreen wanted to create something that sounded "spiritual" and dubbed it a "spiritual pop" track. Loreen wanted the track to be "powerful if used the right way". Loreen did not have a song, but had the narrative to the song, and wanted to create it to perform in the finale of Eurovision Song Contest 2024. The narrative of the song is a declaration of love, and that love is the key to life. Loreen conceived the songs first harmonies by singing by a piano, and once a pattern is formed, "A free start from beginning to end. And everything came almost in one take. Of course, we tweaked it a little."

"Forever" was created solely for her Eurovision return performance as a sequel to "Tattoo". Loreen explained that on creating the upcoming album, she has generated a "a whole suite of songs". The album would be a journey of her time from Heal to now, and the album would feature some crying, some job and she wants all feelings to be incorporated within the album. Loreen stated that she does not care about what the music industry expects from her, she said this leads to people being "unhappy" and results in "a big price". Loreen explained that a ballad track "wouldn't suffice" as she needs a beat and speed. Loreen explained that she feels that this is a "spiritual thing. I am from the Atlas Mountains, so I know that you don’t underestimate sounds. There are sounds that open up certain parts of you, certain cells, parts of your spiritual body. A beat opens up the root chakra, the drums open up the root chakra, the speed of things."

== Release and promotion ==
The single was released on 10 May 2024. In order to promote the single, Loreen promoted the single by performing at the Eurovision Song Contest 2024 in Malmö, Sweden, where she was the reigning winner, performing a medley of "Forever" and previous year winner "Tattoo". Loreen performed the song at the French edition of The Voice on 25 May 2024.

== Charts ==
Chart performance
Chart (2024)	Peak position
Sweden (Sverigetopplistan)	60
UK Singles Downloads (OCC)	19
UK Singles Sales (OCC)	19
