= Woman (Jacqline song) =

Single by Jacqline
- Released: 31 January 2026
- Length: 2:56
- Label: Polydor Nordic / Universal Music AB
- Songwriters: Moa "Cazzi Opeia" Carlebecker; Thomas G:son; Jimmy Jansson; Dino Medanhodzic

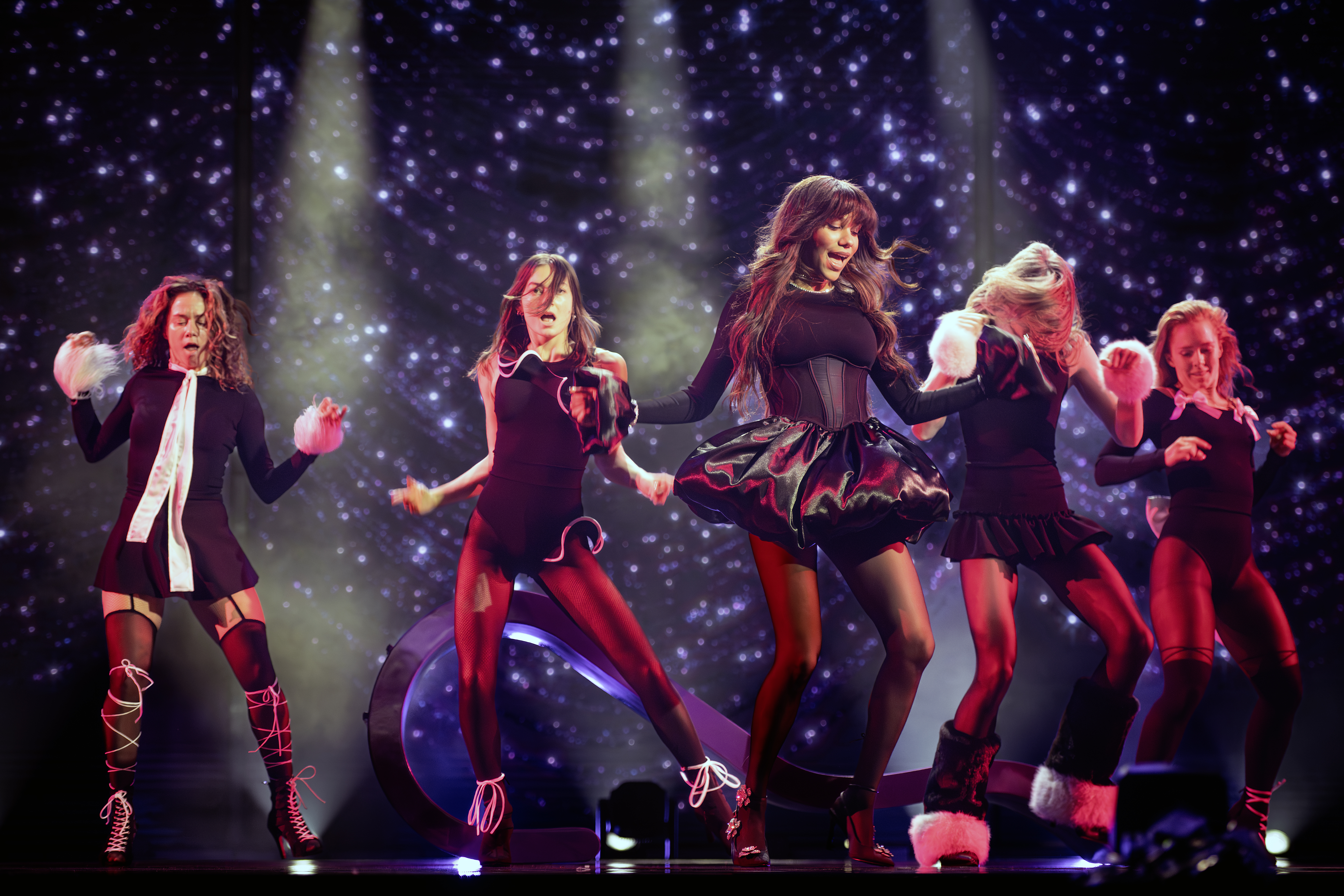
The song performed during the rehearsals for the Melodifestivalen first qualifier round.

"Woman" is a song by Swedish singer Jacqline, released as a single on 31 January 2026. The song was performed in Melodifestivalen 2026. It qualified for the Final qualification heat. It debuted at number 18 in Sweden.

== Charts ==
Chart performance for "Woman"
Chart (2026)	Peak position
Sweden (Sverigetopplistan)	18
