= Tattoo (Loreen song) =

2023 song by Loreen

Single by Loreen
- Released: 25 February 2023
- Genre: Electropop; Europop
- Length: 3:02
- Label: Universal
- Songwriters: Jimmy "Joker" Thörnfeldt; Jimmy Jansson; Lorine Talhaoui; Moa Carlebecker; Peter Boström; Thomas G:son
- Producers: Peter Boström; Jimmy Jansson; Thomas G:son

Loreen singles chronology
| "Neon Lights" (2022) | "Tattoo" (2023) | "Is It Love" (2023) |

Eurovision Song Contest 2023 entry
- Country: Sweden
- Artist: Loreen
- Languages: English
- Composers: Jimmy "Joker" Thörnfeldt; Jimmy Jansson; Lorine Talhaoui; Moa Carlebecker; Peter Boström; Thomas G:son
- Lyricists: Jimmy "Joker" Thörnfeldt; Jimmy Jansson; Lorine Talhaoui; Moa Carlebecker; Peter Boström; Thomas G:son

Finals performance
- Semi-final result: 2nd
- Semi-final points: 135
- Final result: 1st
- Final points: 583

Entry chronology
- ◄ "Hold Me Closer" (2022)
- "Unforgettable" (2024) ►

Performance video
- "Tattoo" (First Semi-Final) on YouTube; "Tattoo" (Grand Final) on YouTube; "Tattoo" (Reprise) on YouTube

"Tattoo" is a song by Swedish singer Loreen, released as a single on 25 February 2023, through Universal. After winning Melodifestivalen 2023, it represented Sweden in the Eurovision Song Contest 2023, winning the competition with 583 points, making Loreen the first female artist to win the contest twice (and second overall, after Johnny Logan), after previously doing so with "Euphoria" in 2012. The song was later included on Loreen's third studio album, Wildfire (2026).

"Tattoo" debuted at number one on the Swedish singles chart. Following its Eurovision win, it reached number one in nine other countries: Austria, Belgium, Greece, Iceland, Israel, Luxembourg, the Netherlands, and Switzerland. It additionally reached the top ten in 17 other countries including Finland, France, Germany, Hungary, Ireland, Lithuania, Norway, Poland, Russia, Ukraine, and the United Kingdom, later becoming the first Eurovision entry in over 27 years to spend two weeks inside the top five of the UK Singles Chart.

"Tattoo" garnered 4,275,290 streams on Spotify the day after the Eurovision final and thus broke the record for the most streams ever achieved in a single day by a Eurovision song. The number of plays also set another record for Loreen: the highest number of streams ever achieved in a single day by a Swedish female artist.

== Background ==
=== Melodifestivalen 2023 ===
In November 2022, Swedish newspaper Aftonbladet reported a rumored return for Loreen in Melodifestivalen, the music competition that Sveriges Television (SVT) uses to select its song and representative for the Eurovision Song Contest. After previously competing in Melodifestivalen three times, Loreen decided to enter a fourth time with "Tattoo". According to Loreen, she initially did not want to enter, but after a "feeling of positivity" and a sense of purpose, she decided to enter the song.

Melodifestivalen 2023 was the 63rd edition of Melodifestivalen, the music competition to select their entrant for the 67th edition of the Eurovision Song Contest. Twenty-eight songs competed, with the songs being split into four heats of seven songs. The top two in each heat immediately moved on to the contest's final, while the third and fourth place songs in the heats moved onto a semi-final round. In the semi-final round, the top four songs earned a spot in the final. In the final, a 50/50 system of juries and televoting was used to determine the winner in a final with 12 songs.

Before the contest, "Tattoo" was reported as a heavy favorite to win its heat. "Tattoo" was placed into the fourth heat, and would win the heat, earning an automatic spot in the final. During her heat performance, a stage invasion occurred, in which a person carried a banner with the message "Återställ våtmarker" (transl. "Restore wetlands"), which, according to Återställ Våtmarker, the group that orchestrated the invasion, was a call to repair Sweden's wetlands.

Ahead of the final, "Tattoo" was reported as the top favorite to win the competition, winning fan polls on numerous Eurovision fan site polls and press polls. Along with this, she had also broken numerous Swedish streaming records on Spotify. In the Melodifestivalen 2023 final, "Tattoo" won both the jury and televote, earning 92 and 85 points respectively, for a total of 177 points.

== Composition ==
"Tattoo" was composed and written by Jimmy "Joker" Thörnfeldt, Jimmy Jansson, Lorine Talhaoui, Moa Carlebecker, Peter Boström, and Thomas G:son. In interviews with NME, Loreen stated that the song was "a love song... there is no day without night, and there is no love without the opposite either... We tend to think that the grass is greener on the other side but if you want to experience this deep, authentic love, you have to be aware that the struggle needs to be there too. We can’t run off the moment we feel a little bit of pain." Musically, it has been described as a "bombastic electro-pop ballad", and by Eurovision itself it was marketed as Europop.

== Eurovision ==
On 9 May 2023, the first semi-final of the Eurovision Song Contest was held at the Liverpool Arena in Liverpool hosted by the British Broadcasting Corporation (BBC) on behalf of the Public Broadcasting Company of Ukraine (UA:PBC). Loreen performed "Tattoo" eleventh on the evening and qualified for the grand final.

On 13 May 2023, the Eurovision Song Contest grand final was hosted in the same venue. Loreen performed "Tattoo" ninth on the evening. At the end of the voting, it placed first winning the contest with 583 points.

=== Aftermath ===
As the winning broadcaster, the European Broadcasting Union (EBU) gave SVT the responsibility to host the following edition of the Eurovision Song Contest. SVT hosted the 68th edition at the Malmö Arena in Malmö. On 9 May 2024, the second semi-final was opened by a pre-recorded segment in which presenters Petra Mede and Malin Åkerman performed "Tattoo" with minor lyrical changes. On 11 May 2024, Loreen performed "Tattoo" and her new single "Forever" at the interval act of the grand final.

== Personnel ==
Credits were adapted from Tidal.

- Jimmy Jansson – producer, songwriting
- Peter Boström – producer, songwriting, mix engineer, string arranger, studio personnel
- Thomas G:son – producer, songwriting
- Jimmy Thörnfeldt – songwriting
- Loreen Talhaoui – songwriting, vocals
- Moa "Cazzi Opeia" Carlebecker – songwriting, background vocals
- David Bukokvinszky – cello
- Erik Uusijärvi – cello
- Kristina Winiarski – cello
- Pelle Hansen – cello
- Åsa Strid – cello
- Bård Ericson – double bass
- Sigrid Granit – double bass
- Lars Norgren – mastering engineer, studio personnel
- Erik Arvinder – orchestra leader
- Mattias Bylund – string arranger, synth pads
- Christopher Öhman – viola
- Erik Holm – viola
- Kim Hellgren – viola
- Mikael Sjögren – viola
- Vidar Andersson Meilink – viola
- Aleksander Sätterström – violin
- Anna Stefansson – violin
- Brusk Zanganeh – violin
- Carl Vallin – violin
- Conny Lindgren – violin
- Daniela Bonfiglioli – violin
- Jannika Gustafsson – violin
- Lola Torrente – violin
- Martin Stensson – violin
- Mattias Johansson – violin
- Paul Waltman – violin
- Sarah Cross – violin
- Simona Bonfiglioli – violin
- Tove Lund – violin

== Charts ==
=== Weekly charts ===
Weekly chart performance
| Chart (2023–2024) | Peak position |
|---|---|
| Australia Digital Tracks (ARIA) | 9 |
| Austria (Ö3 Austria Top 40) | 1 |
| Belarus Airplay (TopHit) | 2 |
| Belgium (Ultratop 50 Flanders) | 1 |
| Belgium (Ultratop 50 Wallonia) | 1 |
| Bulgaria Airplay (PROPHON) | 3 |
| Canada Digital Sales (Billboard) | 37 |
| CIS Airplay (TopHit) | 4 |
| Croatia (Billboard) | 5 |
| Croatia International Airplay (Top lista) | 4 |
| Czech Republic Airplay (ČNS IFPI) | 3 |
| Czech Republic Singles Digital (ČNS IFPI) | 9 |
| Denmark (Tracklisten) | 13 |
| Ecuador Anglo Airplay (Monitor Latino) | 8 |
| Estonia Airplay (TopHit) | 20 |
| Finland (Suomen virallinen lista) | 3 |
| France (SNEP) | 7 |
| Germany (GfK) | 7 |
| Global 200 (Billboard) | 15 |
| Greece International (IFPI) | 1 |
| Hungary (Single Top 40) | 5 |
| Iceland (Tónlistinn) | 1 |
| Ireland (IRMA) | 3 |
| Israel International Airplay (Media Forest) | 1 |
| Italy (FIMI) | 24 |
| Kazakhstan Airplay (TopHit) | 4 |
| Latvia Airplay (LaIPA) | 20 |
| Latvia Streaming (LaIPA) | 2 |
| Lithuania (AGATA) | 2 |
| Lithuania Airplay (TopHit) | 1 |
| Luxembourg (Billboard) | 1 |
| Moldova Airplay (TopHit) | 1 |
| Netherlands (Dutch Top 40) | 1 |
| Netherlands (Single Top 100) | 1 |
| New Zealand Hot Singles (RMNZ) | 19 |
| Norway (VG-lista) | 2 |
| Peru Anglo Airplay (Monitor Latino) | 13 |
| Poland (Polish Airplay Top 100) | 2 |
| Poland (Polish Streaming Top 100) | 4 |
| Portugal (AFP) | 15 |
| Romania (Billboard) | 18 |
| Romania Airplay (Media Forest) | 3 |
| Russia Airplay (TopHit) | 6 |
| Slovakia Airplay (ČNS IFPI) | 21 |
| Slovakia Singles Digital (ČNS IFPI) | 23 |
| Spain (Promusicae) | 22 |
| Suriname (Nationale Top 40) | 2 |
| Sweden (Sverigetopplistan) | 1 |
| Switzerland (Schweizer Hitparade) | 1 |
| Turkey International Airplay (Radiomonitor Türkiye) | 4 |
| UK Singles (Official Charts) | 2 |
| Ukraine Airplay (TopHit) | 8 |

2025–2026 weekly chart performance
| Chart (2025–2026) | Peak position |
|---|---|
| Belarus Airplay (TopHit) | 55 |
| CIS Airplay (TopHit) | 100 |
| Estonia Airplay (TopHit) | 145 |
| Lithuania Airplay (TopHit) | 148 |
| Moldova Airplay (TopHit) | 36 |
| Poland (Polish Airplay Top 100) | 53 |
| Romania Airplay (TopHit) | 57 |
| Russia Airplay (TopHit) | 108 |
| Spain Airplay (Promusicae) | 39 |
| Ukraine Airplay (TopHit) | 79 |

=== Monthly charts ===
2023 monthly chart performance
| Chart (2023) | Peak position |
|---|---|
| Belarus Airplay (TopHit) | 3 |
| CIS Airplay (TopHit) | 7 |
| Czech Republic (Rádio Top 100) | 15 |
| Czech Republic (Singles Digitál Top 100) | 22 |
| Estonia Airplay (TopHit) | 36 |
| Kazakhstan Airplay (TopHit) | 7 |
| Latvia Airplay (TopHit) | 20 |
| Lithuania Airplay (TopHit) | 2 |
| Moldova Airplay (TopHit) | 1 |
| Romania Airplay (TopHit) | 19 |
| Russia Airplay (TopHit) | 13 |
| Slovakia (Rádio Top 100) | 22 |
| Slovakia (Singles Digitál Top 100) | 33 |
| Ukraine Airplay (TopHit) | 7 |

2025 monthly chart performance
| Chart (2025) | Peak position |
|---|---|
| Belarus Airplay (TopHit) | 55 |
| Moldova Airplay (TopHit) | 46 |
| Romania Airplay (TopHit) | 78 |
| Ukraine Airplay (TopHit) | 94 |

=== Year-end charts ===
2023 year-end chart performance
| Chart (2023) | Position |
|---|---|
| Austria (Ö3 Austria Top 40) | 31 |
| Belarus Airplay (TopHit) | 25 |
| Belgium (Ultratop 50 Flanders) | 2 |
| Belgium (Ultratop 50 Wallonia) | 2 |
| Bulgaria Airplay (PROPHON) | 10 |
| CIS Airplay (TopHit) | 18 |
| Denmark (Tracklisten) | 57 |
| Ecuador Anglo Airplay (Monitor Latino) | 41 |
| Estonia Airplay (TopHit) | 81 |
| France (SNEP) | 21 |
| Global 200 (Billboard) | 178 |
| Iceland (Tónlistinn) | 1 |
| Kazakhstan Airplay (TopHit) | 20 |
| Latvia Airplay (TopHit) | 46 |
| Lithuania Airplay (TopHit) | 6 |
| Moldova Airplay (TopHit) | 25 |
| Netherlands (Dutch Top 40) | 8 |
| Netherlands (Single Top 100) | 7 |
| Poland (Polish Airplay Top 100) | 28 |
| Poland (Polish Streaming Top 100) | 30 |
| Portugal (AFP) | 68 |
| Portugal Airplay (AFP) | 18 |
| Romania Airplay (TopHit) | 42 |
| Russia Airplay (TopHit) | 51 |
| Sweden (Sverigetopplistan) | 3 |
| Switzerland (Schweizer Hitparade) | 9 |
| Ukraine Airplay (TopHit) | 30 |
| UK Singles (OCC) | 84 |
| Ukraine Airplay (TopHit) | 33 |

2024 year-end chart performance
| Chart (2024) | Position |
|---|---|
| Belarus Airplay (TopHit) | 79 |
| Belgium (Ultratop 50 Flanders) | 74 |
| Belgium (Ultratop 50 Wallonia) | 77 |
| CIS Airplay (TopHit) | 105 |
| Ecuador Anglo Airplay (Monitor Latino) | 80 |
| Estonia Airplay (TopHit) | 173 |
| France (SNEP) | 82 |
| Moldova Airplay (TopHit) | 20 |
| Portugal (AFP) | 118 |
| Switzerland (Schweizer Hitparade) | 54 |

2025 year-end chart performance for "Tattoo"
| Chart (2025) | Position |
|---|---|
| Belarus Airplay (TopHit) | 72 |
| CIS Airplay (TopHit) | 175 |
| Estonia Airplay (TopHit) | 176 |
| Moldova Airplay (TopHit) | 168 |
| Peru Airplay (Monitor Latino) | 31 |

== Certifications ==
Certifications and sales
| Region | Certification | Certified units/sales |
|---|---|---|
| Belgium (BRMA) | 2× Platinum | 80,000^{‡} |
| Brazil (Pro-Música Brasil) | 2× Platinum | 80,000^{‡} |
| Denmark (IFPI Danmark) | Platinum | 90,000^{‡} |
| France (SNEP) | Diamond | 333,333^{‡} |
| Germany (BVMI) | Gold | 300,000^{‡} |
| Italy (FIMI) | Platinum | 100,000^{‡} |
| New Zealand (RMNZ) | Gold | 15,000^{‡} |
| Poland (ZPAV) | Diamond | 250,000^{‡} |
| Portugal (AFP) | 3× Platinum | 30,000^{‡} |
| Spain (Promusicae) | 2× Platinum | 120,000^{‡} |
| Switzerland (IFPI Switzerland) | Gold | 10,000^{‡} |
| United Kingdom (BPI) | Platinum | 600,000^{‡} |
Streaming
| Greece (IFPI Greece) | 2× Platinum | 4,000,000^{†} |
^{‡} Sales+streaming figures based on certification alone.^{†} Streaming-only figures based on certification alone.

| Preceded by "Stefania" by Kalush Orchestra | Eurovision Song Contest winners 2023 | Succeeded by "The Code" by Nemo |
