= Effortless =

2024 song by Jacqline

Single by Jacqline
- Released: 2 March 2024
- Genre: Pop; dance-pop
- Length: 2:51
- Label: Universal
- Songwriters: Dino Medanhodzic; Jacqline Mossberg Mounkassa; Jimmy Jansson; Moa Carlebecker; Thomas G:son
- Producer: Dino Medanhodzic

Jacqline singles chronology
"Last Christmas" (2023)	"Effortless" (2024)	"Hurt Me Like You Do" (2024)

Lyric video
- "Effortless" on YouTube

Melodifestivalen performances
- "Effortless" (Heat 3) on YouTube "Effortless" (Final) on YouTube

"Effortless" is a song by Swedish singer and songwriter Jacqline. The song was released as a single on 2 March 2024. The song competed in Melodifestivalen 2024.

== Background and release ==
"Effortless" was composed and written by Jacqline, together with Dino Medanhodzic, Jimmy Jansson, Moa Carlebecker, and Thomas G:son. The song was described as a love song with a contemporary pop flare.

The song was released on digital platforms on 2 March 2024. The lyric video of the song was released the following day.

== Melodifestivalen 2024 ==
On 1 December 2023, it was announced that the song will be competing in Melodifestivalen 2024, Sweden's national selection for the Eurovision Song Contest 2024. The song was drawn to compete in the third heat on 17 February 2024, and later qualified to the final after winning the third heat. In the final, the song finished 9th, placing 4th in the international juries and 10th in the televote.

== Charts ==
Chart performance for "Effortless"
Chart (2024)	Peak position
Sweden (Sverigetopplistan)	6

== Certifications ==
Certifications for "Effortless"
Region	Certification	Certified units/sales
Streaming
Sweden (GLF)	Gold	6,000,000^{†}
^{†} Streaming-only figures based on certification alone.

== Release history ==
Release dates and formats for "Effortless"
Region	Date	Format(s)	Label	Type	Ref.
Various	2 March 2024	Digital download; streaming	Universal	Single	
