= Give My Heart a Break =

Single by Cazzi Opeia
- Released: 2 March 2024
- Length: 3:03
- Label: Starchild Production
- Songwriters: Ellen Berg; Jimmy Jansson; Moa Carlebecker; Thomas G:son

Cazzi Opeia singles chronology
"Taste of Heaven" (2023)	"Give My Heart a Break" (2024)

"Give My Heart a Break" is a song by Swedish singer Cazzi Opeia, released as a single on 2 March 2024. It was performed in Melodifestivalen 2024.

== Charts ==
Chart performance for "Give My Heart a Break"
Chart (2024)	Peak position
Sweden (Sverigetopplistan)	7
