= Lia Larsson =

Swedish singer

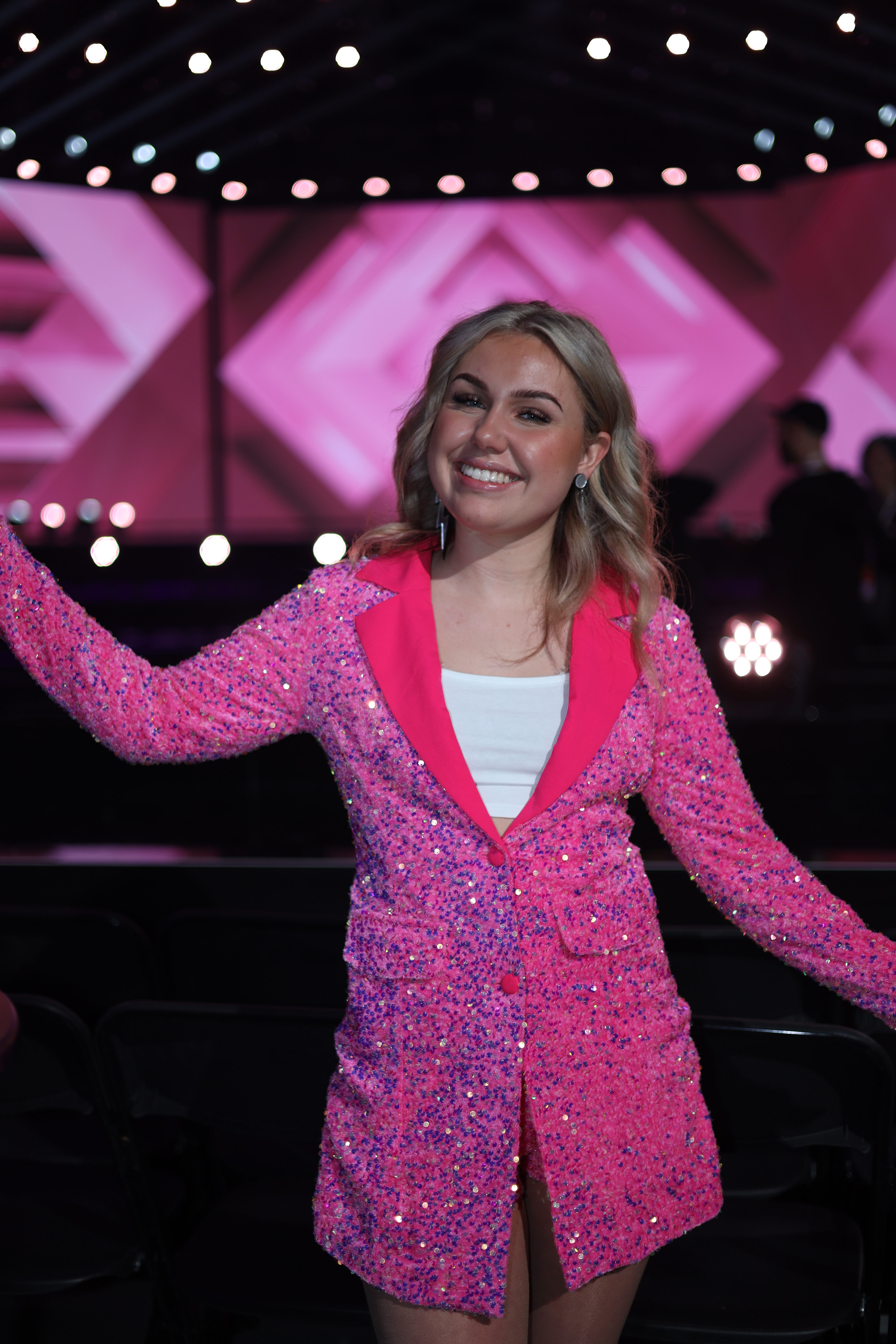
- Lia Larsson in 2024

Background information
- Birth name: Olivia Helena Julia Larsson Kind
- Born: 14 February 2001 (age 24)
- Occupation: Singer

Olivia Helena Julia Larsson Kind (born 14 February 2001), best known as Lia Larsson, is a Swedish singer. In 2023, Larsson guest-starred in Allsång på Skansen broadcast on SVT.

She participated in Melodifestivalen 2024 with the song "30 km/h".

== Discography ==
=== Charting singles ===
List of charting singles, with selected peak chart positions
Title	Year	Peak chart positions	Album
Title	Year	SWE	Album
"30 km/h"	2024	2	Non-album singles
"Fulla" (with Silje Bakke)	2024	76	Non-album singles
