= 30 km/h =

Single by Lia Larsson
- Released: 24 February 2024
- Length: 2:48
- Label: Emperial
- Songwriters: Axel Schylström; Jimmy Jansson; Lia Larsson; My Söderholm; Thomas G:son

Lia Larsson singles chronology
"Norrland" (2024)	"30 km/h" (2024)

"30 km/h" is a song by Swedish singer Lia Larsson, released as a single on 24 February 2024. It was performed in Melodifestivalen 2024.

== Charts ==
=== Weekly charts ===
Weekly chart performance for "30 km/h"
Chart (2024)	Peak position
Sweden (Sverigetopplistan)	2

=== Year-end charts ===
Year-end chart performance for "30 km/h"
Chart (2024)	Position
Sweden (Sverigetopplistan)	96
