= Aldrig mer =

2024 song by Clara Klingenström

Single by Clara Klingenström
- English title: "Never Again"
- Released: 17 February 2024
- Length: 3:04
- Label: Warner; Freebird Entertainment AB; ADA Nordic
- Songwriters: Bobby Ljunggren; Clara Klingenström; David Lindgren Zacharias
- Producers: Bobby Ljunggren; Clara Klingenström; David Lindgren Zacharias; David Zandén

Clara Klingenström singles chronology
"Kan nått fint få hända sen" (2023)	"Aldrig mer" (2024)

Melodifestivalen performance
- "Aldrig mer (Heat 3)" on YouTube

"Aldrig mer" (Swedish: [ˈâldrɪ(ɡ) ˈmeːr]; transl. "Never Again") is a song by Swedish singer and songwriter Clara Klingenström. The song was released as a single on 17 February 2024 and competed in Melodifestivalen 2024.

== Background and composition ==
"Aldrig mer" was written by Klingenström, together with Bobby Ljunggren and David Lindgren Zacharias. They also produced the song together with David Zandén. In an interview, Klingenström spoke of the song's development: "We all met at [Ljunggren]’s house. [Zacharias] and [Ljunggren] had made a melody that I got to listen to and it was the melody for the chorus of this song. After that we started making the melody for the rest of the song. I took the melody home with me and wrote the lyrics. I always want to write the lyrics myself because of the storytelling in my songs."

Klingenström described the song as a follow-up to her previous Melodifestivalen entry, "Behöver inte dig idag". She basically described the song as an expression of her feelings when writing the lyrics of the song.

== Melodifestivalen 2024 ==
On 1 December 2023, it was announced that the song will be competing in Melodifestivalen 2024, Sweden's national selection for the Eurovision Song Contest 2024. The song was drawn to compete in the third heat on 17 February 2024, but failed to qualify to the final.

== Charts ==
Chart performance for "Aldrig mer"
Chart (2024)	Peak position
Sweden Heatseeker (Sverigetopplistan)	2

== Release history ==
Release dates and formats for "Aldrig mer"
Region	Date	Format(s)	Label	Ref.
Various	17 February 2024	Digital download; streaming	Warner; Freebird Entertainment AB; ADA Nordic	
