= Cazzi Opeia =

Swedish DJ, singer and songwriter (born 1988)

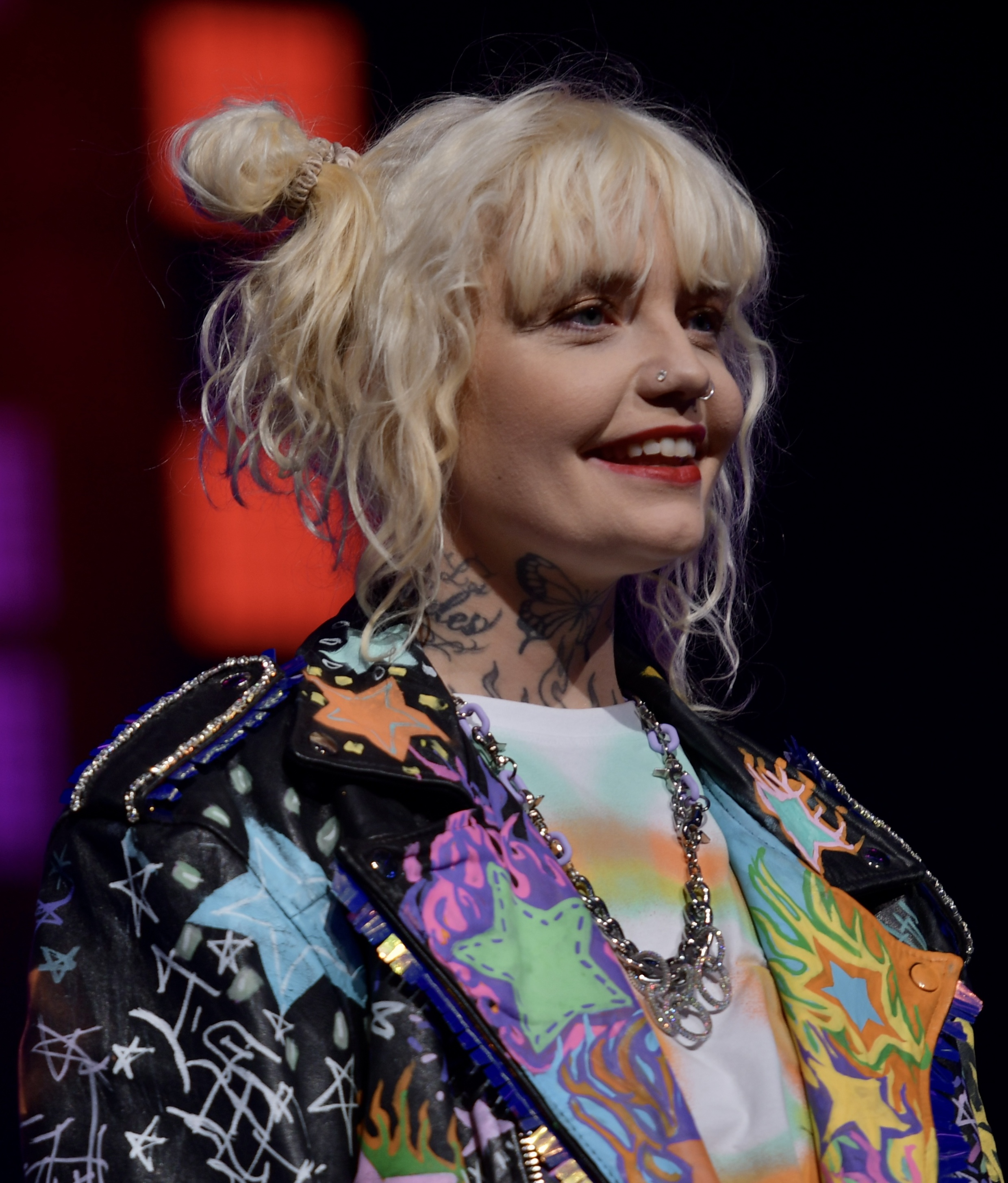
- Cazzi Opeia in 2022

Background information
- Born: Moa Anna Maria Carlebecker; 10 November 1988 (age 38); Jönköping County, Sweden
- Genres: Pop; Electronica; EDM
- Occupations: DJ; singer; songwriter
- Years active: 2009–present
- Labels: EKKO Music; INgrooves
- Website: cazziopeia.com

Moa Anna Maria Carlebecker (born 10 November 1988), better known by her stage name Cazzi Opeia (Swedish: [ˈkætsi ɔ(ʊ)ˌpiːjə]), is a Swedish DJ, singer and songwriter.

== Life and career ==
=== 1988–2010: Early life and beginnings ===
Moa Anna Carlebecker was born in Jönköping County, located in southern Sweden, and grew up traveling around Europe and in the US with her family. She is a cousin of presenter Gry Forssell. Her stage name, Cazzi Opeia, is inspired by the star constellation Cassiopeia.

She took part in the sixth season of Idol in 2009. She reached the semi-finals where she was beaten by Mariette Hansson and Erika Selin.

=== 2011–2015: Music career ===
She was discovered by the producer Billy Mann and the record company Macho Records, who previously worked with Pink, Cher, and Jessica Simpson. Her first single "I Belong to You" became a hit when the artist DJ Tiësto included a remix in his Club Life record, making Cazzi Opeia a name globally. She has also been praised for her style and music by celebrity blogger Perez Hilton in connection with her dubstep cover of Lady Gaga's hit song "Judas".

=== 2016–2017: "Batman & Robin" ===
In 2016, Cazzi Opeia signed an exclusive worldwide publishing agreement with EKKO Music Rights Europe. She also signed an exclusive worldwide record deal with Superior Recordings licensed to Cosmos Music Group and The Orchard in 2017. She released the single, titled "Batman & Robin" together with Jin X Jin.

=== 2017–2018: "Wild Ones" and "Rich" ===
On 5 May 2017, Cazzi Opeia was featured on artist 528's track, titled "Meat". The track was released by independent record label "Hurdy Gurdy Noise".

Cazzi Opeia's single, titled "Wild Ones" released by Superior Recordings / Cosmos Music on 1 December 2017 and featured the "Wild Ones" track and the instrumental version as well Along with the song being released, Cazzi Opeia teamed up with the Swedish Space Corporation and broadcast her single into space, more specifically in the direction of the Cassiopeia constellation.

Cazzi Opeia's single, titled "Rich" released by Superior Recordings / Cosmos Music on 16 November 2018.

=== 2022–present: Melodifestivalen and Eurovision ===
Cazzi Opeia competed in Melodifestivalen 2022 with the song "I Can't Get Enough". She performed in heat 3 on 19 February 2022, qualifying to the semi-final on 5 March, from which she qualified for the final on 12 March 2022, when she finished 9th.

In 2023, she co-wrote "Tattoo" performed by Loreen, which came first in Melodifestivalen 2023, and proceeded to win the Eurovision Song Contest 2023 held in Liverpool.

Cazzi Opeia participated in Melodifestivalen 2024 with "Give My Heart a Break"; she also co-wrote the entry "Effortless" for Jacqline. She finished second in her heat on 17 February 2024, qualifying for the final, where she finished in 4th place.

== Discography ==
=== Singles ===
==== As lead artist ====
Title	Year	Peak chart positions	Album
Title	Year	SWE	Album
"I Belong to You"	2010	—	Non-album single
"Oxygene"	2011	—	Oxygen
"My Heart in 2"	2011	—	Non-album singles
"Here We Go Again"	2015	—	Non-album singles
"Here She Comes"	2016	—	Non-album singles
"Batman & Robin" (with JinXJin)	2017	—	Non-album singles
"Wild Ones"	2017	—	Non-album singles
"Rich"	2018	—	Non-album singles
"I Can't Get Enough"	2022	5	Non-album singles
"You're My Sunshine"	2022	—	Non-album singles
"Taste of Heaven"	2023	—	Non-album singles
"Give My Heart a Break"	2024	7	Non-album singles
"—" denotes a recording that did not chart or was not released in that territory.

==== As featured artist ====
Title	Year	Album
"Endless Flame" (Joseph Armani featuring Cazzi Opeia)	2014	Non-album single
"Fallen Skies" (Still Young featuring Cazzi Opeia)	2016	Finally
"Meat" (528 featuring Cazzi Opeia)	2017	Non-album singles
"Garbage" (Joakim Molitor featuring Cazzi Opeia)	2019	Non-album singles

=== Songwriting credits ===
Year	Artist	Song	Album	Label
2017	Twice	"Someone Like Me"	Signal	JYP Entertainment
2017	Twice	"24/7"	Twicetagram	JYP Entertainment
2017	Red Velvet	"Peek-a-Boo"	Perfect Velvet	SM Entertainment
2017	Djamila	"Smalltalk"	—N/a	BitStream/Universal
2017	Eva + Manu	"Alien"		EMI Finland
2017	B.A.P	"Moondance"	Massive	TS Entertainment
2018	Gabriel Fontana	"Stiletto's On"		
2018	Shinee	"You & I"	The Story of Light	SM Entertainment
2018	DJ Hyo	"Punk Right Now"	Deep	SM Entertainment
2018	Twice	"Dance the Night Away"	Summer Nights	JYP Entertainment
2018	Red Velvet	"Power Up"	Summer Magic	SM Entertainment
2018	Red Velvet	"Blue Lemonade"	Summer Magic	SM Entertainment
2018	NCT Dream	"Drippin"	We Go Up	SM Entertainment
2019	Tomorrow X Together	"Blue Orangeade"	The Dream Chapter: Star	Big Hit
2019	Red Velvet	"Sunny Side Up!"	The ReVe Festival: Day 1	SM Entertainment
2019	Red Velvet	"Milkshake"	The ReVe Festival: Day 1	SM Entertainment
2019	Red Velvet	"Psycho"	The ReVe Festival: Finale	SM Entertainment
2019	Red Velvet	"In & Out"	The ReVe Festival: Finale	SM Entertainment
2019	Sulli	"Goblin"	Goblin	SM Entertainment
2019	DJ Hyo	"Badster"	Deep	SM Entertainment
2019	NCT Dream	"119"	We Boom	SM Entertainment
2019	GWSN	"Black Hole"	The Park in the Night Part Three	The Wave Music
2019	Louam	"Big Loop"		daWorks Records
2019	Twice	"Hot"	Fancy You	JYP Entertainment
2019	Itzy	"Icy"	It'z Icy	JYP Entertainment
2019	Eva Parmakova	"Lipstick"		Virginia Records
2019	DJ Antoine	"I Still Want You"		Global Productions
2020	ELRIS	"Jackpot"	Jackpot	HUNUS Entertainment
2020	Enhypen	"Given-Taken"	Border: Day One	Belift Lab
2020	Tomorrow X Together	"Wishlist"	Minisode1: Blue Hour	Big Hit
2020	AleXa	"Kitty Run"	Do or Die	ZB Label
2020	AleXa	"Do or Die"	Do or Die	ZB Label
2020	AleXa	"A.I Trooper"	Do or Die	ZB Label
2020	Itzy	"Surf"	Not Shy	JYP Entertainment
2020	Itzy	"Be in Love"	Not Shy	JYP Entertainment
2020	WayV	"Unbreakable"	Awaken the World	SM Entertainment
2020	Verivery	"Photo"	FACE ME	Jellyfish Entertainment
2020	Twice	"Queen"	Eyes Wide Open	JYP Entertainment
2020	Twice	"Shot Clock"	Eyes Wide Open	JYP Entertainment
2020	The Boyz	"Break Your Rules"	Reveal	IST Entertainment
2020	Emma Wu	"Go Home, huh?"	GX	Avex Taiwan
2020	BTS	"We Are Bulletproof: The Eternal"	Map of the Soul: 7	Big Hit
2020	I-Land	"I&credible"	I-Land Part 1: Final Song	Stone Music
2020	GFriend	"Mago"	Walpurgis Night	Source Music
2021	Itzy	"Tennis (0:0)"	Guess Who	JYP Entertainment
2021	ENHYPEN	"Fever"	Border: Carnival	Belift Lab
2021	ENHYPEN	"Mixed Up"	Border: Carnival	Belift Lab
2021	Weeekly	"Holiday Party"	Play Game: Holiday	IST Entertainment
2021	Stray Kids	"Secret Secret"	Noeasy	JYP Entertainment
2021	Tomorrow X Together	"LO$ER=LOVER"	The Chaos Chapter: Fight or Escape	Big Hit
2021	Red Velvet	"Queendom"	Queendom	SM Entertainment
2021	Red Velvet	"Pose"	Queendom	SM Entertainment
2021	Red Velvet	"Knock on Wood"	Queendom	SM Entertainment
2021	VERIVERY	"Underdog"	Series 'O' Round 2: Hole	Jellyfish Entertainment
2021	ENHYPEN	"Tamed-Dashed"	Dimension: Dilemma	Belift Lab
2021	ENHYPEN	"Blessed-Cursed"	Dimension: Dilemma	Belift Lab
2021	Billlie	"Flipp!ng A Coin"	The Billage of Perception: Chapter One	Mystic Story
2021	NCT 127	"Gimme Gimme"	Loveholic	SM Entertainment
2021	Dwin, Lucky Luke	"NOTSOBAD"		Hi Don't Cry
2021	AleXa	"Xtra"	Xtra	ZB Label
2021	WayV	"Good Time"	Kick Back	SM Entertainment
2021	Pentagon	"1+1"	Love or Take	Cube Entertainment
2021	Loona	"Be Honest"	[&]	Blockberry Creative
2021	Victon	"Flip a Coin"	Voice: The Future Is Now	IST Entertainment
2021	Cherry Bullet	"Keep Your Head Up"	Cherry Rush	FNC Entertainment
2021	NCT Dream	"Diggity"	Hot Sauce	SM Entertainment
2021	Oh!GG	"Melody"	2021 Winter SMTOWN: SMCU Express	SM Entertainment
2021	Ailee	"525"	AMY	Rocket3 Entertainment
2022	AleXa	"Tattoo"	Tattoo	ZB Label
2022	Ailee	"Murder On The Dancefloor"	I'M LOVIN' AMY	Rocket3 Entertainment
2022	Tomorrow X Together	"Good Boy Gone Bad"	Minisode 2: Thursday's Child	Big Hit
2022	Tomorrow X Together	"Thursday’s Child Has Far To Go"	Minisode 2: Thursday's Child	Big Hit
2022	Momoland	"Yummy Yummy Love"	Non-album single	MLD Entertainment
2022	Hyo	"Deep"	Deep	SM Entertainment
2022	TRENDZ	"TNT (Truth & Trust)"	BLUE SET Chapter 1.TRACKS	INTERPARK MUSIC PLUS
2022	AleXa	"Wonderland"	Non-album single	ZB Label
2022	Le Sserafim	"The Great Mermaid"	Fearless	Source Music
2022	Le Sserafim	"No Celestial"	Antifragile	Source Music
2022	Jo Yu-ri	"Love Shhh!"	Op.22 Y-Waltz: in Major	Wake One Entertainment
2022	NCT 127	"2 Baddies"	2 Baddies	SM Entertainment
2022	NCT 127	"Tasty"	2 Baddies	SM Entertainment
2022	Girls' Generation	"Paper plane"	Forever 1	SM Entertainment
2022	Red Velvet	"Bye Bye"	The ReVe Festival 2022 – Birthday	SM Entertainment
2022	Red Velvet	"Snap Snap"	Bloom	Avex Trax
2022	Fifty Fifty	"Higher"	The Fifty	Attrakt
2022	AleXa	"Back in Vogue"	Back in Vogue	ZB Label
2023	Loreen	"Tattoo"	Non-album single	Universal Music Group
2023	Tomorrow X Together	"Sugar Rush Ride"	The Name Chapter: Temptation	Big Hit
2023	Tomorrow X Together	"Farewell, Neverland"	The Name Chapter: Temptation	Big Hit
2023	Kep1er	"I Do! Do You?"	Fly-By	Sony Music Japan
2023	Moonchild	"Photogenic"	Delicious Poison	Sony Music Japan
2023	aespa	"Spicy"	My World	SM Entertainment
2023	aespa	"Salty & Sweet"	My World	SM Entertainment
2023	aespa	"Hot Air Balloon"	Drama	SM Entertainment
2023	Red Velvet	"Chill Kill"	Chill Kill	SM Entertainment
2023	Red Velvet	"Knock Knock (Who's There?)"	Chill Kill	SM Entertainment
2023	Red Velvet	"Will I Ever See You Again?"	Chill Kill	SM Entertainment
2023	Red Velvet	"Nightmare"	Chill Kill	SM Entertainment
2023	Red Velvet	"One Kiss"	Chill Kill	SM Entertainment
2023	Red Velvet	"Bulldozer"	Chill Kill	SM Entertainment
2023	NCT	"Baggy Jeans"	Golden Age	SM Entertainment
2023	NCT	"Golden Age"	Golden Age	SM Entertainment
2023	Shinee	"Identity"	Hard	SM Entertainment
2023	TVXQ	"Rebel"	20&2	SM Entertainment
2023	Fantasy Boys	"One Shot!"	New Tomorrow	Kakao Entertainment
2023	Fantasy Boys	"Get It On"	Potential	Kakao Entertainment
2023	fromis 9	"Bring It On"	Unlock My World	Pledis Entertainment
2023	Mimiirose	"A-Ok"	Live	Yes Im Entertainment
2023	Billlie	"Dang! (Hocus Pocus)"	Side-B: Memoirs of Echo Unseen	Mystic Story
2023	Le Sserafim	"No-Return (Into the unknown)"	Unforgiven	Source Music
2023	Le Sserafim	"Guardian"	Bastions OST	THYMOS Media
2024	Jacqline	"Effortless"	Non-album single	Universal
2024	Tomorrow X Together	"Deja Vu"	Minisode 3: Tomorrow	Big Hit
2024	StayC	"Gummy Bear"	Metamorphic	High Up
2024	aespa	"Hot Mess"	Non-album single	Warner Music Japan/SM Entertainment
2024	aespa	"Licorice"	Armageddon	SM Entertainment
2024	aespa	"Bahama"	Armageddon	SM Entertainment
2024	aespa	"Just Another Girl"	Whiplash	SM Entertainment
2024	Red Velvet	"Sunflower"	Cosmic	SM Entertainment
2024	NCT Wish	"Sail Away"	Wishful	SM Entertainment
2024	B.D.U	"My One"	Wishpool	Orca Music
2024	fromis 9	"Take A Chance"	Supersonic	Pledis Entertainment
2024	AleXa	"Under The Armor"	Sugarcoat	ZB Label
2025	Ifeye	"NERDY"	ERLU BLUE	Hi-Hat Entertainment
2025	Illit	"Do the Dance" (빌려온 고양이)	Bomb	Belift Lab
2025	Red Velvet – Irene & Seulgi	"Girl Next Door"	Tilt	SM Entertainment
2025	NCT Dream	"Dream Team"	Go Back To The Future	SM Entertainment
2025	Super Junior	"Delight"	Super Junior25	SM Entertainment
2025	Key	"Hunter"	Hunter	SM Entertainment
2025	Key	"Glam"	Hunter	SM Entertainment
2025	Joy	"Get Up and Dance"	From Joy, with Love	SM Entertainment
2025	Twice	"Blind In Love"	Enemy	Warner Music Japan
2026	KiiiKiii	"404 (New Era)"	Delulu Pack	Starship Entertainment
2026	A-Teens	"Iconic"	Non-album single	Universal Music Sweden
2026	Jacqline	"Woman"	Non-album single	Möonbabe
2026	AleXa	"Tongue Tied"	Non-album single	Sony Music Entertainment Sweden AB
2026	Illit	"Bubee"	Non-album single	Belift Lab
2026	Shinee	"Anti Believer"	Atmos	SM Entertainment
