= Jacqline =

Swedish singer (born 1998)

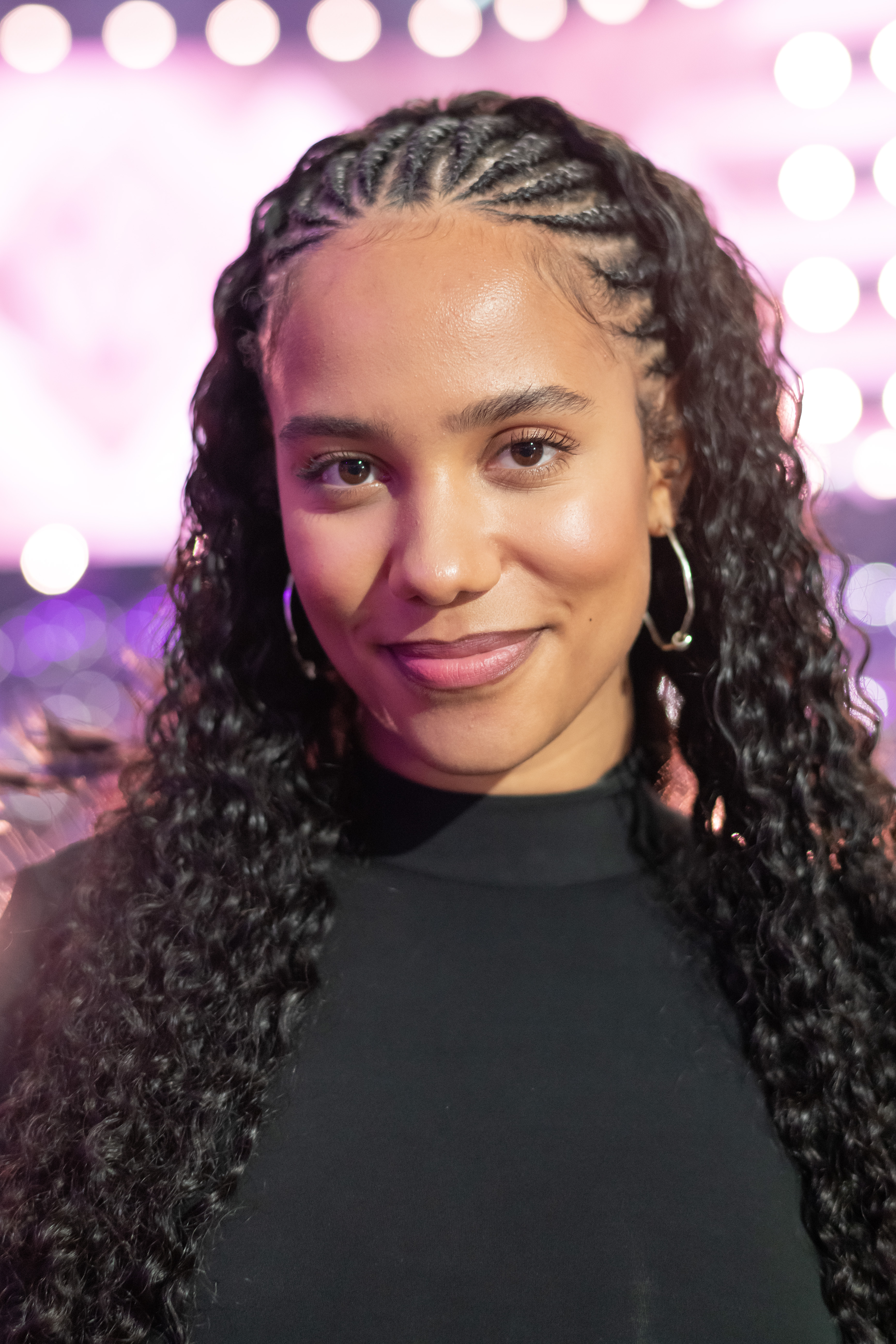
- Jacqline at Melodifestivalen 2024

Background information
- Born: Jacqline Lie Hope Clarine People Mossberg Mounkassa; 2 July 1998 (age 28); Tumba, Sweden
- Genres: Pop
- Occupation: Singer
- Years active: 2021 – present

Jacqline Lie Hope Clarine People Mossberg Mounkassa (born 2 July 1998), known mononymously as Jacqline (Swedish pronunciation: [jaˈkliːn]), is a Swedish singer.

== Career ==
Mossberg Mounkassa was born into a musical family, her Congolese father Lajo being a music producer and songwriter. When she was 16 years old, she dropped out of high school to devote herself entirely to music. In the spring of 2021, she released her first single, "Do It Better". On the day of the launch, she had been poisoned, was hospitalized and risked permanent damage to her vocal cords. During the summer, she considered giving up her music career altogether.

=== Idol 2021 ===
In the autumn 2021, Mossberg Mounkassa was one of the participants in the seventeenth season of the TV program Idol on TV4. She joined the program by applying to its new concept Idolraketen which aired apart from the regular Idol program on TV4 Play. There, along with four other applicants, she was assigned to the Stockholm region, and later she was also selected to become that region's idol rocket, this after dueling against the same-age Ella Öberg (who would later return in the last episode due to a dropout from another idol rocket) from the same region. Through the second part of the Idol gig, the qualifying week and the qualifying final, Mossberg Mounkassa managed to become one of the participants in the top 13 by receiving one of the jury's six wild cards, this after she had only a few days earlier failed to advance to the qualifying final from her qualifying heat. On 3 December 2021, it was confirmed that Mossberg Mounkassa would face Birkir Blær in the idol final held at the Avicii Arena on 10 December. Once in the final, she finished in second place.

=== Melodifestivalen ===
Mossberg Mounkassa participated in Melodifestivalen 2024, the Swedish selection for the Eurovision Song Contest 2024, with the song "Effortless". She ultimately placed ninth in the final, with 40 points from the juries, 21 points from the televote, totalling 61 points.

She is participating in Melodifestivalen 2026, the Swedish selection for the Eurovision Song Contest 2026, with the song "Woman".

== Discography ==
=== Extended plays ===
List of extended plays, with selected details and chart positions
Title	EP details	Peaks
Title	EP details	SWE
Forever June	Released: 14 August 2026; Label: Polydor Nordic / Universal Music AB; Formats: Digital download, streaming	—

=== Singles ===
Title	Year	Peak chart positions	Certifications	Album or EP
Title	Year	SWE	Certifications	Album or EP
"Do It Better"	2021		—	Non-album singles
"Question My Love"	2023		—	Non-album singles
"Last Christmas"	2023	—		Non-album singles
"Effortless"	2024	6	GLF: Gold	Non-album singles
"Hurt Me Like You Do"	2024	—		Non-album singles
"Glove"	2025	—		Non-album singles
"Woman"	2026	18		Forever June
"On Top"	2026	—		Forever June
"—" denotes a recording that did not chart or was not released in that territory.
