= Marcus & Martinus discography =

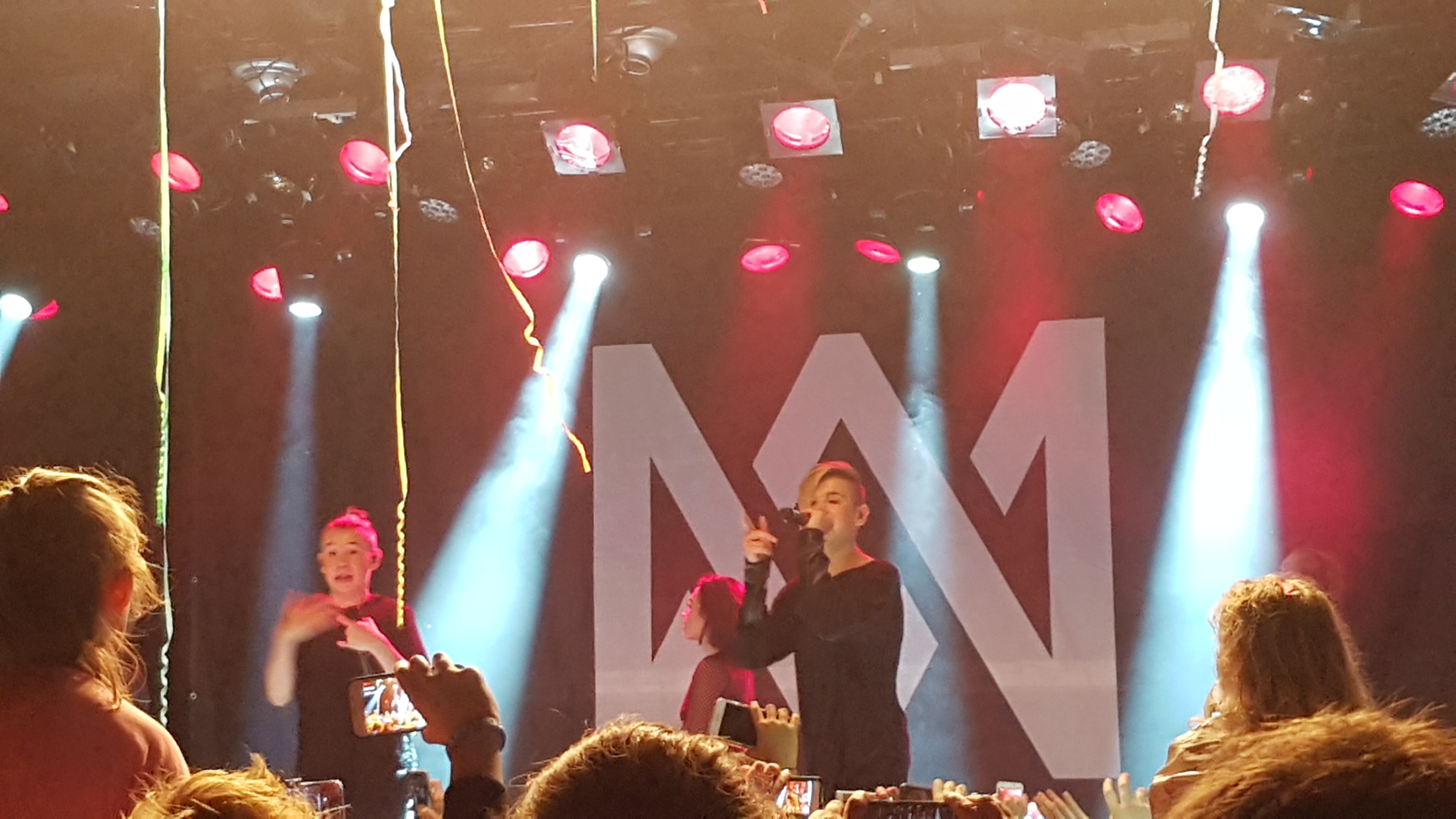
- Studio albums: 5
- EPs: 1
- Singles: 61

Norwegian pop duo Marcus & Martinus has released five studio albums, two EPs and 61 singles. Their debut studio album, Hei, was released in February 2015. It peaked at number 1 on the Norwegian Albums Chart. A special follow-up album, Hei – Fan-Spesial was released in November 2015 including additional tracks. Their second studio album, Together, was released in November 2016. It peaked at number 1 on the Norwegian Albums Chart and Swedish Albums Chart. Their third studio album, Moments, was released in November 2017. It peaked at number 1 on the Norwegian Albums Chart and Swedish Albums Chart. Their first EP, Soon, was released in June 2019. Their fourth studio album, Unforgettable, was released in May 2024. Their fifth studio album, The Room, was released in November 2025.

== Studio albums ==
Title	Details	Peak chart positions								
Title	Details	NOR	AUT	BEL (FL)	DEN	FIN	LTU	NLD	POL	SWE
Hei	Released: 23 February 2015; Label: Sony Music Entertainment Norway; Format: Digital download, CD	1	—	—	—	—	—	—	—	2
Together	Released: 4 November 2016; Label: Sony Music Entertainment Norway; Format: Digital download, CD	1	—	—	11	6	—	—	19	1
Moments	Released: 17 November 2017; Label: Sony Music Entertainment Norway; Format: Digital download, CD	1	51	173	3	2	—	98	49	1
Unforgettable	Released: 31 May 2024; Label: Universal; Format: Digital download	38	—	178	—	44	8	—	—	39
The Room	Released: 14 November 2025; Label: Universal; Format: Digital download	—	—	—	—	—	—	—	—	—
"—" denotes an album that did not chart or was not released in that territory.

== Live albums ==
Title	Details
The Room — Live Recording from The Room Tour	Released: 4 October 2026; Label: Universal; Format: Vinyl

== Extended plays ==
Title	Details
Bae (Remixes)	Released: 5 March 2017; Label: Sony Music Entertainment Norway; Format: Digital download
Soon	Released: 10 June 2019; Label: RCA; Format: Digital download

== Singles ==
Title	Year	Peak chart positions							Album
Title	Year	NOR	FIN	IRE	KAZ Air.	LTU	NLD	SWE	Album
"To dråper vann"	2012	8	—	—	*	—	—	—	Hei
"Leah"	2013	—	—	—	*	—	—	—	Hei
"Du"	2014	—	—	—	*	—	—	—	Hei
"Smil (song)"	2014	—	—	—	*	—	—	—	Hei
"Plystre på deg"	2015	—	—	—	*	—	—	— (Note: "Plystre på deg" did not enter the Swedish Singles Chart, but peaked at number five on the Swedish Heatseeker chart.)	Hei
"Elektrisk" (featuring Katastrofe)	2015	3	—	—	*	—	—	8	Hei (Fan Spesial)
"Ei som deg" (with Innertier)	2015	15	—	—	*	—	—	—	Hei (Fan Spesial)
"Alt jeg ønsker meg"	2015	28	—	—	*	—	—		Hei (Fan Spesial)
"Girls" (featuring Madcon)	2016	1	—	—	*	—	—	40	Together
"Heartbeat"	2016	21	—	—	*	—	—	61	Together
"I Don't Wanna Fall In Love"	2016	37	—	—	*	—	—	— (Note: "I Don't Wanna Fall in Love" did not enter the Swedish Singles Chart, but peaked at number eight on the Swedish Heatseeker chart.)	Together
"Light It Up" (featuring Samantha J)	2016	9	—	—	*	—	—	23	Together
"One More Second"	2016	30	—	—	*	—	—	57	Together
"Go Where You Go"	2016	—	—	—	*	—	—	—	Together
"Without You"	2016	—	—	—	*	—	—	—	Together
"Bae"	2017	—	—	—	*	—	—	— (Note: "Bae" did not enter the Swedish Singles Chart (Sverigetopplistan), but peaked to number 1 on the Sweden Heatseeker Songs.)	Together
"Like It Like It" (featuring Silentó)	2017	16	—	—	*	—	—	48	Moments
"First Kiss"	2017	—	—	—	*	—	—	52	Moments
"Dance With You"	2017	40	—	—	*	—	—	48	Moments
"Make You Believe In Love"	2017	34	—	—	*	—	—	47	Moments
"One Flight Away"	2017	—	—	—	*	—	—	79	Moments
"Never" (featuring Omi)	2017	—	—	—	*	—	—	—	Moments
"Remind Me" (Note: "Remind Me" features on the Deluxe edition of Moments.)	2018	—	—	—	*	—	—	63	Moments
"Invited"	2018	—	—	—	*	—	—	— (Note: "Invited" did not enter the Swedish Singellista Chart, but peaked at number 20 on the Swedish Heatseeker Chart.)	Soon
"Pocket Dial"	2019	—	—	—	*	—	—	—	Soon
"Love You Less"	2020	—	—	—	*	—	—	—	Non-album singles
"It's Christmas Time"	2020	—	—	—	*	—	—	—	Non-album singles
"Belinda" (featuring Álex Rose)	2021	20	—	—	*	—	—	—	Non-album singles
"Feel" (with Bruno Martini)	2021	—	—	—	*	—	—	—	Non-album singles
"When All the Lights Go Out"	2022	—	—	—	*	—	—	—	Unforgettable
"Wicked Game"	2022	—	—	—	*	—	—	—	Unforgettable
"Gimme Your Love" (with Medun)	2022	—	—	—	*	—	—	—	Unforgettable
"Air"	2023	—	—	—	—	—	—	4	Unforgettable
"247365"	2023	—	—	—	—	—	—	—	Unforgettable
"Christmas to Me"	2023	—	—	—	—	—	—	54	The Room
"We Are Not the Same" (featuring bbno$)	2024	—	—	—	—	—	—	—	Unforgettable
"Unforgettable"	2024	26	19	92	—	10	75	1	Unforgettable
"Another Life" (with Vize)	2024	—	—	—	—	—	—	— (Note: "Another Life" did not enter the Swedish Singellista Chart, but peaked at number two on the Swedish Heatseeker Chart.)	The Room
"Wonder"	2025	—	—	—	—	—	—	—	The Room
"Endless Summer"	2025	—	—	—	—	—	—	—	The Room
"The Room"	2025	—	—	—	—	—	—	—	The Room
"Nattevandrer" (recorded for Hver gang vi møtes)	2026	22	—	—	—	—	—	—	Non-album singles
"Ta meg tillbake" (recorded for Hver gang vi møtes)	2026	37	—	—	—	—	—	—	Non-album singles
"Den fyrste song" (recorded for Hver gang vi møtes)	2026	28	—	—	—	—	—	—	Non-album singles
"Her vil e vær" (recorded for Hver gang vi møtes; with Isah)	2026	30	—	—	—	—	—	—	Non-album singles
"Jente i fra by'n" (recorded for Hver gang vi møtes)	2026	62	—	—	—	—	—	—	Non-album singles
"Nonchalant" (recorded for Hver gang vi møtes; with Synne Vo)	2026	14	—	—	—	—	—	—	Non-album singles
"I natt" (recorded for Hver gang vi møtes; with Hagle)	2026	33	—	—	—	—	—	—	Non-album singles
"Moonlight" (with Leony)	2026	—	—	—	6	— (Note: "Moonlight" did not enter the AGATA Singlų Top 100, but peaked at number 30 on the TopHit Lithuanian Airplay.)	—	—	Non-album singles
"—" denotes a recording that did not chart or was not released in that territory. "*" denotes that the chart did not exist at that time.

== Other charted songs ==
Title	Year	Peak chart positions	Album
Title	Year	SWE Heat.	Album
"Love Flow"	2024	20	Unforgettable
