= Unforgettable =

Unforgettable may refer to:

== Film ==
- Unforgettable (1996 film), a thriller starring Ray Liotta
- Unforgettable (2014 film), a Bollywood film
- Unforgettable (2016 film), a South Korean film
- Unforgettable (2017 film), an American thriller film
- Unforgettable (2019 film), a Filipino film

== TV ==
- The Unforgettable, a 2000–2002 and 2010–2012 British television documentary programme
- Unforgettable (American TV series), a 2011–2016 crime drama series
- Unforgettable (Philippine TV series), a 2013 romantic-fantasy series
- "Unforgettable" (Star Trek: Voyager), a 1998 episode of Star Trek: Voyager

== Music ==
=== Albums ===
- Unforgettable (Dinah Washington album), 1961
- Unforgettable (Fullerton College Jazz Band album), 1985
- Unforgettable (Imran Khan album), 2009
- Unforgettable (Joe Pass album), 1998
- Unforgettable (Leroy Hutson album), 1979
- Unforgettable (Marcus & Martinus album), 2024
- Unforgettable (Merle Haggard album), 2004
- Unforgettable (Nat King Cole album), 1952
- Unforgettable (Selena album), 2005
- Unforgettable: A Tribute to Dinah Washington, by Aretha Franklin, 1964
- Unforgettable... with Love, by Natalie Cole, 1991
- Unforgettable, by Tinga Stewart, 2000

=== Songs ===
- "Unforgettable" (French Montana song), 2017
- "Unforgettable" (Godsmack song), 2018
- "Unforgettable" (Marcus & Martinus song), 2024
- "Unforgettable" (Melon Kinenbi song), 2007
- "Unforgettable" (Nat King Cole song), 1951
- "Unforgettable" (Thomas Rhett song), 2017
- "Unforgettable (Tommy's Song)", by Demi Lovato, 2021
- "Unforgettable", by Alok, 2025
- "Unforgettable", by Pier Gonella from 667, 2023

== Other uses ==
- Unforgettable (novel), a 2007 It Girl novel by Cecily von Ziegesar
- Unforgettable, an annual event sponsored by KoreAm
- The Unforgettables, four seniors on the 1991–92 Kentucky Wildcats men's basketball team

== See also ==
- Memories (radio network) or Unforgettable Favorites
