= Staysman =

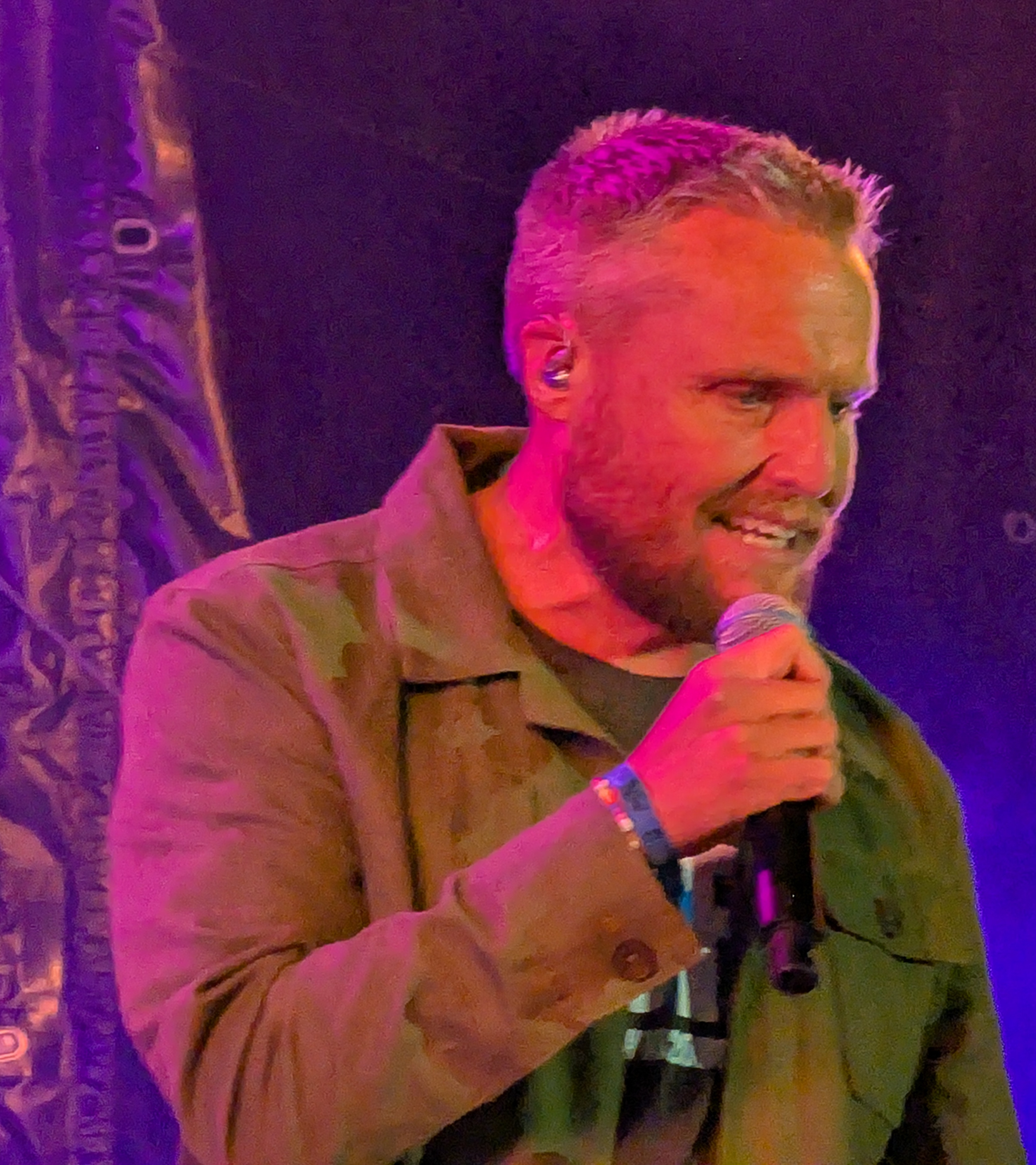
- Staysman in 2026.

Background information
- Also known as: Staysman
- Born: Stian Thorbjørnsen; March 10, 1982 (age 44); Gressvik
- Genres: Party
- Occupations: musician; songwriter; host
- Member of: Staysman & Lazz

Stian Thorbjørnsen (born 10 March 1982 in Gressvik), known under the stage name Staysman, is a Norwegian singer, songwriter and presenter.

== Background ==
Together with Lasse Jensen, Thorbjørnsen formed the duo Staysman & Lazz, before they disbanded in 2020. The duo was discovered when they took part in a singing competition organized by the weekly magazine Se og Hør with the song "Uten sko" in 2010. In 2015 they participated in Melodi Grand Prix with his song "En godt stekt pizza" and ended up in third place in the final.

He became known to a larger audience in 2012, when he participated in season 4 of the TV3 series Paradise Hotel. He was a participant in the TV3 series "Robinsonekspedisjonen" in 2013.

In 2015, he participated in the program Skal vi danse on TV 2, where he finished in second place. In 2018 and 2019, he led the question program 10 at the top on NRK. In the spring of 2021, Thorbjørnsen was part of Hver gang vi møtes on TV 2, together with the artists Arne Hurlen, Hanne Krogh, Maria Mena, Agnete Saba, Trygve Skaug and Hkeem.

In 2023, he led Melodi Grand Prix 2023 together with Arian Engebø.

== Discography ==
=== Own publications ===
- Staysvan (2014), with Katastrofe
- Good Vibes 2014 (2014), with Björklund and Morgan Sulele
- Vardafjell 2014 (2014)
- Bleik og sur (2014), with Katastrofe & M.M.B
- Et drikkehjem 2014 (2014), with Martin Tungevaag
- Smaker så godt (2014), with Bøbben
- 10 liter kaffe og hjemmebrent (2015), with Folloruss 2015
- Step Brothers 2016 (2016), with Adrian Emile and Carl León ft. Morgan Sulele
- Baris (Staysman Remix) (2017), with Mr. Pimp-Lotion and Oral Bee
- Trang trikot (2018), with Boblandslaget, Vegard Harm, Svein Østvik & Emil Gukild

=== Staysman & Lazz ===
==== Albums ====
- 1998–2008 (2013)
- Helt sykt store hits (2014)
- Helt sykt Vol. 2 (2017)
- The Essential Staysman & Lazz (2021)

==== Singles/EPs ====
- Uten sko (2011)
- Livet er for kjipt (2011)
- Er så lei (2012), with Johnny Gellein
- …og det var langt på natt (2012)
- En natt til (2012)
- Bare vent (2012)
- Oh My Mind (Toby & Helfner Metal Remix) (2012)
- Frøken Möet (Trekant) (2012)
- Russ 2013 (du er deilig, du er spretten) (2013)
- Kaptein Morgan (2013), with Jesper Borgen
- Kings of Asia (2013), with Kings of Asia
- Metal Sessions (2013)
- Haldens nummer 9 (Trollmannen fra Os) (2013), with Bingobanden
- Se så glad nissen er (2013)
- Brun og blid (TIX Remix) (2014), with Katastrofe & M.M.B
- Ballongmannen (2014), with Ballongmannen and Morgan Sulele
- Brun og blid (Disco Jumperz Remix) (2014)
- Et drikkehjem (2014), with Martin Tungevaag
- Russ 2014 (du er født i '95) (2014)
- Min skyld (2014), with Ole I'Dole
- 18 Wiener (2014), with Katastrofe
- En godt stekt pizza (2015), with Katastrofe
- 20 kilo ekstra (2015), with Torgeir and Kjendisene
- Skilles Johanne (2015)
- Lærerinna (2015), with Innertier
- Alle gutta (2015)
- Hjem til deg (2015)
- En sinnsykt godt stekt pizza (2016)
- Her er rompa mi (2016)
- Frågan (2016, under the name Lasse Stianz)
- En siste gang (2017)
- KJØRR (2017), with Klish
- Muggene er megasvære (elsker øl) (2017), with DJ Anton
- Om 100 år er allting glemt (2017), with Lothepus
- Kyss meg (2018)

=== Participating in ===
- Lars Corleone ft. Howard: Uten sko (2014)
- Sony Music Entertainment: Kule Kidz – Stjernemix 1 (2014)
- Morgan Sulele: Morgans kleineste (2015)
- ESS Engros: Livets glade gutter 2 – 19 norske festfavoritter (2015)
- Sony Music Entertainment: Julebord 2015 (2015)
- Torgeir & Kjendisene: En runde til (2016)
- Elov & Beny: Kör (2017)
- Sony Music Entertainment: Raggarbilshits Vol. 3: Raggaerrock & Rockabilly (2018)
- Staysman, Henning Kvitnes, Ole Evenrud: Det Ville Østen (2023)

== Bibliography ==
- How to become a norsk superkjendis (English: How to become a Norwegian superstar) (2016)
