= Katastrofe =

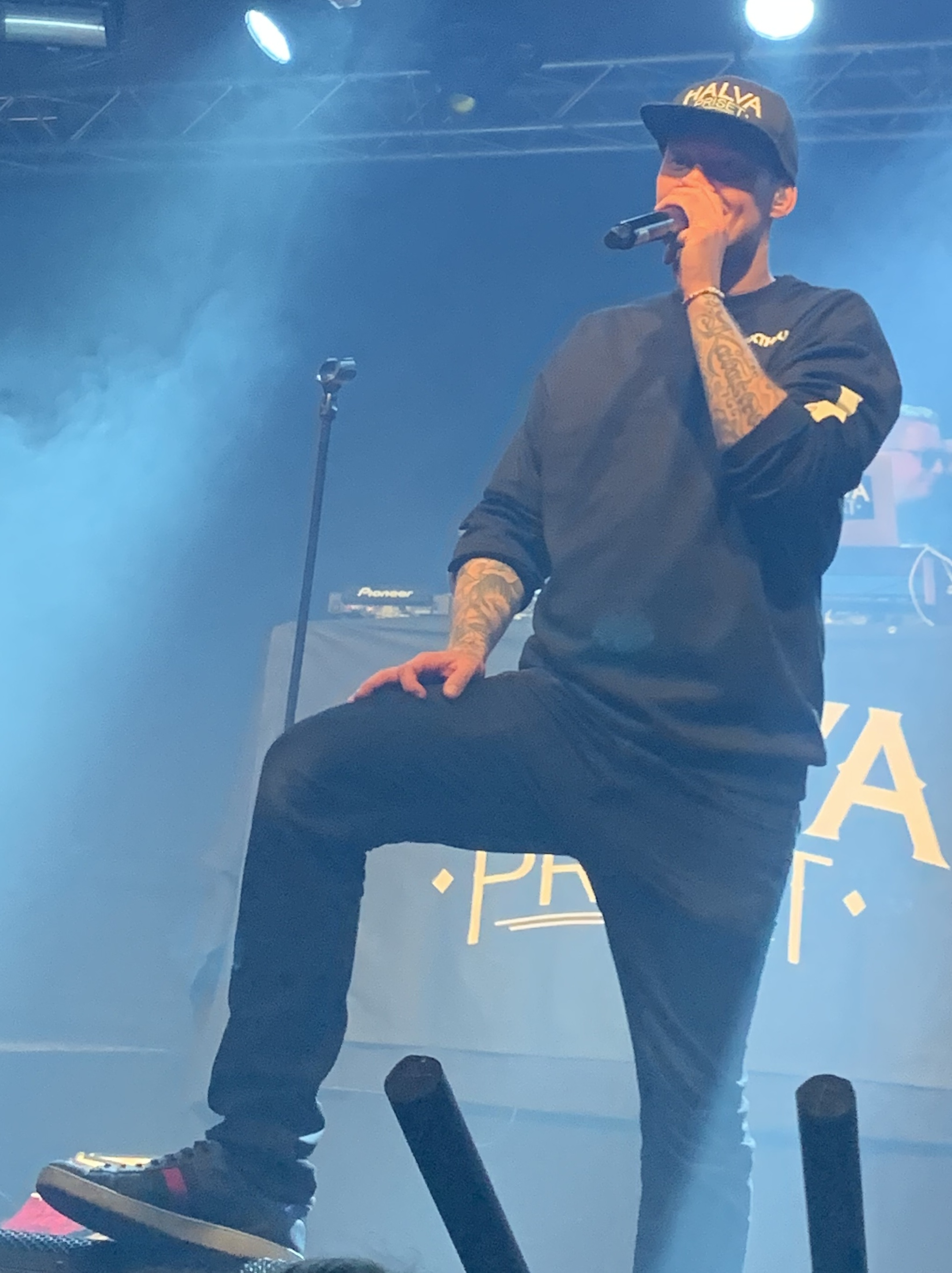
- Katastrofe performing in 2022

Background information
- Born: Petter Bjørklund Kristiansen; 14 May 1989 (age 37); Fredrikstad, Norway
- Genres: Pop
- Occupations: musician, songwriter
- Years active: 2008–present
- Label: Sony Music

Petter Bjørklund Kristiansen (born 14 May 1989 in Fredrikstad) better known by his stage name Katastrofe, is a Norwegian singer and songwriter. Originating from Fredrikstad in Norway, he is signed to Sony Music Norway.

Kristiansen started his musical career in 2008 with a joint song "Vi prekas" with Isabella Leroy. In 2011 he teamed up with Norwegian hit-producing duo NastyKutt & Kriss with "Nødlanding" that was released on Universal Music. The song enjoyed considerable radio play in Norway leading to another release 2012 when Robin og Bugges featured him in their song "Backpacker" leading to an appearance at the opening of the Norway Football Cup. In 2013, he was featured once again in the Staysman & Lazz hit "Brun og Blid" featuring Katastrofe & M.M.B.

With increasing popularity, Katastrofe had chart success in 2014 on VG lista, the official Norwegian Singles Chart with "Bleik og sur", a cooperation with Staysman & M.M.B. certified as gold. Other chart successes included "Maria" in 2014 and "Pattaya" in 2015. In 2014 he was shortlisted for the "Best Norwegian Act" listing for MTV Europe Music Awards, but didn't make it to the final list. In 2015, he cooperated with Marcus & Martinus, a twin brother duo winner of Melodi Grand Prix Junior. Their song "Elektrisk" featuring Katastrofe made it to number 3 on the Norwegian Singles Chart in 2015. Another notable success was with "Typisk Norsk" in cooperation with Norwegian violinist and Eurovision Song Contest 2009 winner Alexander Rybak. Katastrofe was featured in "Si ja!", a single for Innertier.

Katastrofe co-wrote the song "En godt stekt pizza" for the Norwegian eliminations for the Eurovision Song Contest 2015. The song, performed by Staysman & Lazz, finished in third place on the national Melodi Grand Prix 2015 finals in Norway, failing to qualify.

Katastrofe's 2016 hit "Sangen du hater" has topped VG lista, the Norwegian Singles Chart in 2017, making it his first number one on the chart.

== Discography ==
=== Singles ===
As main artist

| Year | Song | Peak positions |
| Year | Song | NOR |
|---|---|---|
| 2008 | "Vi prekas" (feat. Isabella Leroy) | – |
| 2011 | "Nødlanding" | – |
| 2013 | "Slå deg ned" | – |
| 2014 | "Bleik og sur" (feat. Staysman and M.M.B.) | 11 |
| 2014 | "Maria" | 12 |
| 2014 | "Holde rundt deg" | – |
| 2015 | "Pattaya" | 16 |
| 2015 | "Hinanden ikke" | – |
| 2015 | "Typisk norsk" (feat. Alexander Rybak) | 12 |
| 2015 | "Det var julenissen" | – |
| 2016 | "Sangen du hater" | 1 |
| 2017 | "Om alt går til helvete" | 13 |
| 2017 | "Olav Thon" | – |
| 2018 | "Et bitte lite småbruk oppå Gålå" | 22 |
| 2019 | "Hørt det før" (featuring OnklP and Kriss) | 30 |
| 2020 | "Nå er det helg" | – |
| 2025 | "Jeg har vært en idiot" | 30 |
| 2025 | "Går det bra?" | 48 |
| 2026 | "Vikingblod" | 1 |

As featured artist

| Year | Song | Peak positions | | Album |
| Year | Song | NOR | SWE | Album |
|---|---|---|---|---|
| 2012 | "Backpacker" (Robin og Bugge feat. Katastrofe) | – | – | Non-album singles |
| 2013 | "Brun og blid" (Staysman & Lazz feat. Katastrofe and M.M.B.) | – | – | Non-album singles |
| 2015 | "Elektrisk" (Marcus & Martinus feat. Katastrofe) | 3 | 9 | Hei – Fan-Spesial |
| 2015 | "Rist meg" (Morgan Sulele feat. Katastrofe) | – | – | Non-album singles |
| 2016 | "Vors hos Børre" (Beachbraaten feat. Katastrofe) | – | – | Non-album singles |
| 2016 | "Si ja!" (Innertier feat. Katastrofe) | – | – | Non-album singles |
| 2016 | "Pusterom" (Erik og Kriss feat. Katastrofe and Moi) | – | – | Non-album singles |
| 2025 | "Bögjævel" (Baarli & Benjamin feat. Katastrofe) | 70 | – | Non-album singles |
