= Samantha J =

Jamaican model & singer (born 1996)

- Born: Samantha Gonsalves; 10 October 1996 (age 29); Kingston, Jamaica
- Origin: Saint Ann, Jamaica – Quarter Cast
- Genres: Dancehall; pop; reggae; reggae fusion
- Occupations: Model; singer; songwriter
- Years active: 2013–present
- Labels: Columbia; BMI; Oceanic Tradewinds Music; Washroom Entertainment
- Website: www.samanthajlive.com

Samantha Gonsalves (born 10 October 1996), better known by her stage name Samantha J, is a Jamaican model, singer and songwriter She signed with Columbia Records to release her 2013 single, "Tight Skirt".

Samantha Gonsalves was born in Kingston, Jamaica to parents of Portuguese and Jewish descent. She resides in Saint Ann Parish and attended the Heinz Simonitsch School in Saint James Parish. She was discovered by the Si Mi Yah Agency, while attending a model & talent casting in Ocho Rios.

In 2016, she was featured in the single "Light It Up", a song by Norwegian duo Marcus & Martinus. The song charted both in Norway and Sweden peaking at No. 9 on the Norwegian VG-lista chart and number 23 on the Swedish Sverigetopplistan chart.

== Discography ==
=== Singles ===
==== As lead artist ====
- 2013: "Tight Skirt"
- 2015: "Bad Like Yuh"
- 2015: "League of My Own" (Samantha J featuring Dej Loaf)
- 2017: "Baby Love" (Samantha J featuring R. City)
- 2017: "Rockets"
- 2017: "Your Body"
- 2018: "Picture" (Samantha J featuring Gyptian)
- 2021: "Big Fat Benz"
- 2022: "Push Ya Luck"
- 2025: "Love Me For Me"

==== As featured artist ====
Title	Year	Peak chart positions		Album
Title	Year	NOR	SWE	Album
"Light It Up" (Marcus & Martinus featuring Samantha J)	2016	9	24	Together
"Show Off" (Shenseea featuring Azaryah and Samantha J)	2018	—	—	Non-album singles
"Cut Eye" (Tommy Lee Sparta featuring Samantha J)	2018	—	—	Non-album singles

== Awards and nominations ==
Year	Organisation	Award	Result
2013	Youth View Awards	Favorite Breakout Celebrity	Won
2013	Youth View Awards	Young, Hot & Hype Female of the Year	Nominated
2017	M&K	Sexiest Model	Won
2017	W's Closet	Sexiest Model	Won
