= Light It Up (Marcus & Martinus song) =

Single by Marcus & Martinus featuring Samantha J

from the album Together
- Released: 29 July 2016
- Recorded: 2015
- Genre: Pop
- Length: 3:14
- Label: Sony Music
- Songwriter(s): Erik Fjeld; Ida Wærdahl; Nathaniel Anthony Hewitt; Anthony Webb
- Producer(s): Erik Fjeld

Marcus & Martinus singles chronology
"I Don't Wanna Fall in Love" (2016)	"Light It Up" (2016)	"One More Second" (2016)

Music video
- "Light It Up" on YouTube

"Light It Up" is a song by Norwegian pop duo Marcus & Martinus, featuring vocals from Samantha J. The song was released as a digital download in Norway on 29 July 2016 through Sony Music as the fourth single from their second studio album Together (2016). The song peaked at number 9 on the Norwegian Singles Chart and number 23 on the Swedish Singles Chart.

== Music video ==
A video to accompany the release of "Light It Up" was first released onto YouTube on 29 August 2016 at a total length of three minutes and twelve seconds.

== Charts ==
Chart performance for "Light It Up"
Chart (2016)	Peak position
Norway (VG-lista)	9
Sweden (Sverigetopplistan)	23

== Release history ==
Release history and formats for "Light It Up"
Region	Date	Format	Label
Norway	29 July 2016	Digital download	Sony Music
