= Typisk norsk (song) =

2015 single by Katastrofe

Single by Katastrofe featuring Alexander Rybak
- Released: 27 November 2015
- Recorded: 2014/15
- Genre: Pop
- Length: 2:47
- Label: PBK Entertainment; Sony Music Entertainment Norway
- Songwriter(s): Petter Kristiansen; Alexander Rybak; Erik Smaaland; Kristoffer Tømmerbakke

Katastrofe singles chronology
| "Elektrisk" (2015) | "Typisk norsk" (2015) | "Det var julenissen" (2015) |

Alexander Rybak singles chronology
| "Into a Fantasy" (2014) | "Typisk norsk" (2015) | "I Came to Love You" (2016) |

"Typisk norsk" is a song by Norwegian singer Katastrofe featuring violinist Alexander Rybak. It was released on 27 November 2015 as a digital download in Norway through PBK Entertainment and Sony Music Entertainment Norway. The song peaked at number 12 on the Norwegian Singles Chart, making it Rybak's first single to chart in Norway since "Roll with the Wind" in 2010.

== Music video ==
A music video to accompany the release of "Typisk norsk" was first released onto YouTube on 6 December 2015 at a total length of two minutes and forty-eight seconds.

== Chart performance ==
=== Weekly charts ===
Weekly chart performance for "Typisk norsk"
| Chart (2015) | Peak position |
|---|---|
| Norway (VG-lista) | 12 |

== Release history ==
Release history and formats for "Typisk norsk"
| Region | Date | Format | Label |
|---|---|---|---|
| Norway | 27 November 2015 | Digital download; streaming | PBK Entertainment; Sony Music Entertainment Norway |
