= Melodi Grand Prix Junior 2012 =

Norwegian televised singing competition

Date and venue
- Final: 1 September 2012
- Venue: Oslo Spektrum; Oslo, Norway

Organisation
- Broadcaster: Norsk rikskringkasting (NRK)
- Presenters: Margrethe Røed; Tooji

Participants
- Number of entries: 10

Vote
- Voting system: Televoting, the winner is the one with most votes
- Winning song: "To dråper vann" by Marcus & Martinus

The Melodi Grand Prix Junior 2012 was Norway's eleventh national Melodi Grand Prix Junior for young singers aged 8 to 15. It was held in Oslo Spektrum on Saturday, September 1, 2012, and ten songs participated and broadcast live Norwegian Broadcasting Corporation (NRK). It was hosted by Margrethe Røed and Tooji, the winner of Norwegian Melodi Grand Prix 2012.

The winner was the duo Marcus & Martinus with the song "To dråper vann" (English: "Two Drops of Water"). The song proved to be a hit and was included on their debut album Hei.

The album Melodi Grand Prix Junior 2012 containing the songs of the finals reached No. 2 on the VG-lista Norwegian Albums Chart on weeks 36 of 2012 staying at No. 2 for just one week.

NRK released all the participating songs on the compilation album Melodi Grand Prix Junior 2012. The album spent 21 weeks on the Norwegian VG-lista Albums Chart, reaching number two as the album's highest chart position.

== Broadcast ==
NRK received 513 songs in an open competition and a jury selected ten of them for the final at Oslo Spektrum on Saturday, September 1, 2012. Margrethe Røed and Tooji were the hosts. The participants included one group, two sibling duos and seven solo artists.

First, the ten finalists performed their songs, and television viewers voted four of them to the super final. The four super finalist songs were performed again, before the viewers voted again. Former Melodi Grand Prix Junior 2005 participant Lido performed during the interval before the winner was announced.

The winner was chosen by television viewers, and voting was only possible via SMS or on the MGPjr website. Only the winner was announced, the rest of the songs remained unplaced. The winners were ten-year-old twin brothers Marcus & Martinus from Trofors.

== Results ==
=== First round ===
No.	Artist	Full name	Song	Result
1	Mina	Mina Nystad	"Mas"	Eliminated
2	Berge	Berge Ohm	"På vent"	Super finalist
3	Julie	Julie Stokke	"Bare vær dæ sjøl"	Eliminated
4	Sebastian	Sebastian Eikeland	"Hekta"	Eliminated
5	Beat Track	Felix Øverli, Jon Erlend Nordby and Jenny Marie Haugland	"Drømmer"	Super finalist
6	My Brother & Me	Ariel Kristine Skjærvik and Kevin Endré Skjærvik	"Gi aldri opp"	Eliminated
7	Nina	Nina Ugland	"La meg forstå"	Eliminated
8	Vicky	Ruth Victoria Rømyhr	"Skate"	Super finalist
9	Frida	Frida Augusta Gudim	"Du kan stole på meg"	Eliminated
10	Marcus & Martinus	Marcus Gunnarsen and Martinus Gunnarsen	"To dråper vann"	Super finalist

=== Super Final ===
The exact number of public votes was unknown. Only the winner was announced.

No.	Artist	Song	Position
01	Berge Ohm	"På vent"	Unknown
02	Beat Track	"Drømmer"	Unknown
03	Ruth Victoria Rømyhr	"Skate"	Unknown
04	Marcus & Martinus	"To dråper vann"	1
