= Unforgettable (Marcus & Martinus album) =

Studio album by Marcus & Martinus
- Released: 31 May 2024
- Length: 31:22
- Language: English
- Label: Universal

Marcus & Martinus chronology
| Soon (2019) | Unforgettable (2024) | The Room (2025) |

Singles from Unforgettable
- 1. "When All the Lights Go Out" Released: 27 May 2022; 2. "Wicked Game" Released: 9 September 2022; 3. "Gimme Your Love" Released: 21 October 2022; 4. "Air" Released: 25 February 2023; 5. "247365" Released: 14 July 2023; 6. "We Are Not the Same" Released: 26 January 2024; 7. "Unforgettable" Released: 2 March 2024

Unforgettable is the fourth studio album by Norwegian pop duo Marcus & Martinus, released by Universal Music on 31 May 2024. It was preceded by the release of seven singles, including "Unforgettable", which was the Swedish entry at the Eurovision Song Contest 2024, where it finished in ninth place, and "Air", the duo's entry at Melodifestivalen 2023. It includes collaborations with Medun and bbno$, and includes covers of Chris Isaak's "Wicked Game" and Taemin's "Want", with different English lyrics and retitled "Love Flow".

== Critical reception ==
Scandipop called the highlights "Gimme Your Love", "247365" and the duo's cover of "Wicked Game", also writing: "If it's purely new bops you're after though – then 'Love Flow' and 'Die for You' lead the pack. The former for sounding like it could have been featured on Michael Jackson's Invincible album, and the latter for its homage to house music."

The album was listed on entertainment website Culture Fix as one of their best albums of 2024, sharing: "Showcasing an undeniable vocal prowess and emotive shades on tracks such as When All the Lights Go Out and Chris Isaak cover Wicked Game, Marcus and Martinus continue to assert themselves as two incredible pop stars."

== Track listing ==
Unforgettable track listing
| No. | Title | Writer(s) | Length |
|---|---|---|---|
| 1. | "Unforgettable" | Jimmy "Joker" Thörnfeldt; Joy Deb; Linnea Deb; Marcus Gunnarsen; Martinus Gunnarsen | 2:48 |
| 2. | "Love Flow" | Anne Judith Wik; Jonas Bjordal; Martin Mulholland; Mats Koray Genc; Nermin Harambasic; Ronny Svendsen; Saima Mian; Samaj Ai Bandéh | 3:39 |
| 3. | "Air" | Jimmy "Joker" Thörnfeldt; Joy Deb; Linnea Deb; Marcus Gunnarsen; Martinus Gunnarsen | 2:52 |
| 4. | "Follow Me" | Chris Collins; Jacob Werner; Marcus Gunnarsen; Martinus Gunnarsen | 3:12 |
| 5. | "Gimme Your Love" (with Medun) | Anders Nilsen; Kristin Marie Skolem; Magnus Clausen; Marcus Gunnarsen; Martinus Gunnarsen | 2:45 |
| 6. | "Talk" | Antti Riihimäki; Stephen Puth; Teemu Brunila; Marcus Gunnarsen; Martinus Gunnarsen | 2:51 |
| 7. | "When All the Lights Go Out" | Herman Gardarfve; Melanie Wehbe; Patrik Olsson; Marcus Gunnarsen; Martinus Gunnarsen | 2:48 |
| 8. | "Wicked Game" | Chris Isaak | 2:29 |
| 9. | "Die for You" | Alexander Laitila; Chris Collins; Elsa Carmona | 2:38 |
| 10. | "We Are Not the Same" (featuring bbno$) | Alexander Gumuchian; Emily Harbakk; Marcus Gunnarsen; Martinus Gunnarsen | 2:25 |
| 11. | "247365" | David Kreuger; Fredrik Kempe; Niklas Carson Mattsson; Marcus Gunnarsen; Martinus Gunnarsen | 2:55 |
| Total length: | | | 31:22 |

== Charts ==
Chart performance for Unforgettable
| Chart (2024) | Peak position |
|---|---|
| Belgian Albums (Ultratop Flanders) | 178 |
| Finnish Albums (Suomen virallinen lista) | 44 |
| Lithuanian Albums (AGATA) | 8 |
| Norwegian Albums (VG-lista) | 38 |
| Swedish Albums (Sverigetopplistan) | 39 |

== Release history ==
Release history and formats for Unforgettable
| Region | Date | Format | Label |
|---|---|---|---|
| Norway | 31 May 2024 | Digital download | Universal |
