= Air (Marcus & Martinus song) =

Single by Marcus & Martinus

from the album Unforgettable
- Released: 25 February 2023
- Length: 2:53
- Label: Universal Music
- Songwriter(s): Jimmy "Joker" Thörnfeldt; Joy Deb; Linnea Deb; Marcus Gunnarsen; Martinus Gunnarsen

Marcus & Martinus singles chronology
"Gimme Your Love" (2022)	"Air" (2023)	"247365" (2023)

"Air" is a song by the Norwegian duo Marcus & Martinus, released as a single on 25 February 2023. It was performed in Melodifestivalen 2023, and placed 2nd. It was included on the duo's 2024 album Unforgettable.

== Charts ==
=== Weekly charts ===
Weekly chart performance for "Air"
Chart (2023)	Peak position
Sweden (Sverigetopplistan)	4

=== Year-end charts ===
Year-end chart performance for "Air"
Chart (2023)	Position
Sweden (Sverigetopplistan)	95
