= Alok discography =

This is the discography of Alok, a Brazilian DJ.

== Studio albums ==
Title	Details
Alok	Released: Early 2016; Label: Aldo; Format: CD (Promotional)

== Compilation albums ==
Title	Details
Colcci: Party All the Time	Released: 15 August 2016; Label: House Mag Records; Format: Digital download, CD

== Extended plays ==
Title	Details
Alok Presents Brazilian Bass Part 1	Released: 21 July 2017; Label: Spinnin'; Format: Digital download
Deeper	Released: 11 February 2022; Label: Controversia; Format: Digital download
Rave the World	Released: 17 July 2026; Label: Rave the World; Format: Digital download

== Singles ==
=== As lead artist ===
Title	Year	Peak chart positions										Certifications	Album
Title	Year	BRA	AUT	DEN	FIN	FRA	GER	NLD	NOR	SWE	US Dance	Certifications	Album
"Superstition"	2012	–	–	–	–	–	–	–	–	–	–		Non-album singles
"We Need Hip Hop"	2012	–	–	–	–	–	–	–	–	–	–		Non-album singles
"Put Some Sax On"	2013	–	–	–	–	–	–	–	–	–	–		Non-album singles
"Arabe"	2013	–	–	–	–	–	–	–	–	–	–		Non-album singles
"Higher"	2014	–	–	–	–	–	–	–	–	–	–		Non-album singles
"Naughty People" (featuring Yves Paquet)	2014	–	–	–	–	–	–	–	–	–	–		Non-album singles
"I Know You Feel It"	2014	–	–	–	–	–	–	–	–	–	–		Non-album singles
"House Hop"	2014	–	–	–	–	–	–	–	–	–	–		Non-album singles
"Play My Game"	2014	–	–	–	–	–	–	–	–	–	–		Non-album singles
"The Future"	2015	–	–	–	–	–	–	–	–	–	–		Non-album singles
"Winter Sunset" (with Dazzo featuring Ellie Ka)	2015	–	–	–	–	–	–	–	–	–	–		Non-album singles
"Who Gives" (with Shapeless)	2015	–	–	–	–	–	–	–	–	–	–		Non-album singles
"Yawanawa"	2015	–	–	–	–	–	–	–	–	–	–		Non-album singles
"Feels Good" (with Diego Miranda)	2015	–	–	–	–	–	–	–	–	–	–		Non-album singles
"Freedom in the Valley" (with Dressel, Daavar & Zeppeliin)	2015	–	–	–	–	–	–	–	–	–	–		Non-album singles
"Liquid Blue" (with Dazzo)	2016	–	–	–	–	–	–	–	–	–	–		Non-album singles
"I Need the Bass" (with Sevenn)	2016	–	–	–	–	–	–	–	–	–	–		Non-album singles
"Mix Forever"	2016	–	–	–	–	–	–	–	–	–	–		Non-album singles
"Addiction" (with Nytron)	2016	–	–	–	–	–	–	–	–	–	–		Non-album singles
"Me & You" (featuring Iro)	2016	–	–	–	–	–	–	–	–	–	–		XOXO (Music from the Netflix Original Film)
"Byob" (with Sevenn)	2016	–	–	–	–	–	–	–	–	–	–		Non-album singles
"Bolum Back" (with Liu)	2016	–	–	–	–	–	–	–	–	–	–		Non-album singles
"Do It" (with Dazzo featuring Barja)	2016	–	–	–	–	–	–	–	–	–	–		Non-album singles
"All I Want" (with Liu featuring Stonefox)	2016	–	–	–	–	–	–	–	–	–	–		Non-album singles
"Hear Me Now" (with Bruno Martini featuring Zeeba)	2016	54	40	40	14	17	50	57	8	11	20	PMB: 3× Platinum; BVMI: Gold; IFPI DEN: Gold; SNEP: Platinum	Non-album singles
"Sirene" (with Cat Dealers)	2017	–	–	–	–	–	–	–	–	–	–		Non-album singles
"Fuego" (with Bhaskar)	2017	–	–	–	–	173	–	–	–	–	–		Non-album singles
"Never Let Me Go" (with Bruno Martini featuring Zeeba)	2017	87	–	–	–	–	–	–	–	–	–	PMB: Diamond	Non-album singles
"VillaMix (Suave)" (with Matheus & Kauan)	2017	–	–	–	–	–	–	–	–	–	–	PMB: 2× Platinum	Non-album singles
"Love Is a Temple" (featuring Iro)	2017	–	–	–	–	–	–	–	–	–	–		Non-album singles
"This City" (with Bhaskar featuring Stonefox)	2017	–	–	–	–	–	–	–	–	–	–		Alok Presents Brazilian Bass Part 1
"Alien Technology" (with Hi-Lo)	2017	–	–	–	–	–	–	–	–	–	–		Non-album singles
"Big Jet Plane" (with Mathieu Koss)	2017	76	–	–	–	–	–	–	–	–	–	PMB: Diamond	Non-album singles
"Ocean" (with Zeeba and Iro)	2018	81	–	–	–	–	–	–	–	–	–	PMB: 2× Diamond	Non-album singles
"Bella Ciao" (with Bhaskar and Jetlag Music featuring Andre Sarate and Adolfo Celdran)	2018	–	–	–	–	–	–	–	–	–	–		Non-album singles
"Toda la Noche" (with Mario Bautista)	2018	–	–	–	–	–	–	–	–	–	–		Non-album singles
"Baianá" (featuring Barbatuques and Foreign)	2018	–	–	–	–	–	–	–	–	–	–		Non-album singles
"I Miss U" (with Selva)	2018	–	–	–	–	–	–	–	–	–	–	PMB: 2× Platinum	Non-album singles
"United" (with Armin van Buuren and Vini Vici featuring Zafrir)	2018	–	–	–	–	–	–	–	–	–	–		A State of Trance, Ibiza 2018
"Favela" (with Ina Wroldsen)	2018	–	–	–	–	–	–	–	28	–	–		Non-album singles
"Innocent" (with Yves V featuring Gavin James)	2018	–	–	–	–	–	–	–	–	–	–		Non-album singles
"Próximo Amor" (with Luan Santana)	2018	57	–	–	–	–	–	–	–	–	–	PMB: Platinum	Non-album singles
"Pray" (with Conor Maynard)	2018	–	–	–	–	–	–	–	–	–	–	PMB: Platinum	Non-album singles
"Epitáfio" (featuring Titãs)	2018	–	–	–	–	–	–	–	–	–	–		Non-album singles
"Metaphor" (with Timmy Trumpet)	2019	–	–	–	–	–	–	–	–	–	–	PMB: Gold	Non-album singles
"All the Lies" (with Felix Jaehn featuring The Vamps)	2019	–	–	–	–	–	–	–	–	–	–	PMB: Diamond	Breathe
"Do It Again" (with Steve Aoki)	2019	–	–	–	–	–	–	–	–	–	–		Neon Future IV
"E Depois (Que Sorte a Minha)" (with Seu Jorge and Bid)	2019	–	–	–	–	–	–	–	–	–	–		Non-album single
"Party Never Ends" (with Quintino)	2019	–	–	–	–	–	–	–	–	–	–		Bright Nights
"The Wall" (with Sevenn)	2019	–	–	–	–	–	–	–	–	–	–		Non-album singles
"Tell Me Why" (with Harrison)	2019	–	–	–	–	–	–	–	–	–	–		Non-album singles
"Vale Vale" (with Zafrir)	2019	–	–	–	–	–	–	–	–	–	–		Non-album singles
"Table for 2" (with Iro)	2019	–	–	–	–	–	–	–	–	–	–		Non-album singles
"Killed by the City " (with Bhaskar)	2019	–	–	–	–	–	–	–	–	–	–		Non-album singles
"I Don't Wanna Talk" (with Hugel featuring Amber Van Day)	2019	–	–	–	–	–	–	–	–	–	–		Non-album singles
"On & On" (with Dynoro)	2019	–	–	–	–	–	–	–	–	–	–		Non-album singles
"The Book Is on the Table" (with Jørd and DJ MP4)	2020	–	–	–	–	–	–	–	–	–	–		Non-album singles
"Free My Mind" (with Rooftime and Dubdogz)	2020	–	–	–	–	–	–	–	–	–	–		Non-album singles
"Symphonia" (with Sevenn)	2020	–	–	–	–	–	–	–	–	–	–		Non-album singles
"Hear Me Tonight" (with THRDL!FE)	2020	–	–	–	–	–	–	–	–	–	–		Non-album singles
"Don't Cry for Me" (with Martin Jensen and Jason Derulo)	2020	–	–	–	–	–	–	–	–	91	–	PMB: 2× Platinum	Non-album singles
"Let Me Go" (with Kshmr and Mkla)	2020	–	–	–	–	–	–	–	–	–	–	PMB: Gold	Non-album singles
"Party On My Own" (featuring Faulhaber)	2020	–	–	–	–	–	–	–	–	–	–	PMB: 2× Platinum	Non-album singles
"Alive (It Feels Like)"	2020	–	–	–	–	–	–	–	–	–	–	PMB: Diamond	Non-album singles
"Don't Say Goodbye" (with Ilkay Sencan featuring Tove Lo)	2020	–	–	–	–	–	–	–	–	–	–		Non-album singles
"Liberdade (Quando o grave bate forte" (with MC Don Juan and DJ GBR)	2020	–	–	–	–	–	–	–	–	–	–		Non-album singles
"Rapture" (with Daniel Blume)	2021	–	–	–	–	–	–	–	–	–	–	PMB: Gold	Non-album singles
"Kids On Whizz" (with Everyone You Know)	2021	–	–	–	–	–	–	–	–	–	–		Non-album singles
"Love Again" (with Vize featuring Alida)	2021	–	50	–	–	–	43	–	–	–	–	PMB: Gold	Non-album singles
"TU" (with Mahtheus & Kauan)	2021	–	–	–	–	–	–	–	–	–	–		Non-album singles
"Another You" (with Bloodline featuring The Vamps)	2021	–	–	–	–	–	–	–	–	–	–	PMB: Gold	Non-album singles
"It Don't Matter" (with Sofi Tukker and Inna)	2021	48	–	–	–	–	–	–	–	–	27		Non-album singles
"My Head (Can't Get You Out)" (with Glimmer of Blooms)	2021	37	–	–	–	–	–	–	–	–	–		Non-album singles
"Body on My Mind"	2021	–	–	–	–	–	–	–	–	–	–	PMB: Gold	Non-album singles
"Love Love" (with Mojjo featuring Gilsons)	2021	–	–	–	–	–	–	–	–	–	–	PMB: Gold	Non-album singles
"In My Mind" (featuring John Legend)	2021	68	–	–	–	–	–	–	–	–	–	PMB: 2× Platinum	Non-album singles
"Reunion" (with Dimitri Vegas & Like Mike and Kshmr featuring Zafrir)	2021	–	–	–	–	–	–	–	–	–	–		Non-album singles
"Wherever You Go" (featuring John Martin)	2021	37	–	–	–	–	–	–	–	–	–		Non-album singles
"Squid Game (Let's Play)"	2021	–	–	–	–	–	–	–	–	–	–		Non-album singles
"Typical" (with Steve Aoki featuring Lars Martin)	2021	–	–	–	–	–	–	–	–	–	–		Non-album singles
"Un Ratito" (with Luis Fonsi and Lunay featuring Lenny Tavárez and Juliette)	2022	–	–	–	–	–	–	–	–	–	–		Non-album singles
"Side Effect" (featuring Au/Ra)	2022	–	–	–	–	–	–	–	–	–	–		Deeper
"Keep Walking" (with Rooftime)	2022	–	–	–	–	–	–	–	–	–	–		Non-album singles
"Headlights" (with Alan Walker featuring Kiddo)	2022	–	–	–	–	–	–	–	15	59	–		Non-album singles
"Meu Amor" (with Ixã)	2022	67	–	–	–	–	–	–	–	–	–		Non-album singles
"Run into Trouble" (with Bastille)	2022	31	–	–	–	–	–	–	–	–	29		Non-album singles
"The Club Is Jumpin'"	2022	–	–	–	–	–	–	–	–	–	–		Non-album singles
"Deep Down" (with Ella Eyre and Kenny Dope featuring Never Dull)	2022	58	16	29	38	90	19	20	35	55	32		Non-album singles
"Always Feel Like"	2022	–	–	–	–	–	–	–	–	–	–		Non-album singles
"All by Myself" (with Sigala and Ellie Goulding)	2022	–	–	–	–	116	–	70	–	–	35		Higher Than Heaven (Deluxe) and Every Cloud – Silver Linings
"Kill Me"	2022	–	–	–	–	–	–	–	–	–	–		Non-album singles
"Surrender" (with UHU and You)	2022	–	–	–	–	–	–	–	–	–	–		Non-album singles
"Work with My Love" (with James Arthur)	2023	–	–	–	–	–	–	– (Note: "Work with My Love" did not enter the Dutch Single Top 100, but peaked at number three on the Single Tip chart.)	–	–	28		Non-album singles
"Boa Sorte" (with Cat Dealers and Vanessa Da Mata)	2023	–	–	–	–	–	–	–	–	–	–		Non-album singles
"Ready Set Go (from Honor of Kings)"	2023	–	–	–	–	–	–	–	–	–	–		Non-album singles
"Over Again" (with Solardo)	2023	–	–	–	–	–	–	–	–	–	–		Non-album singles
"Mami Mami"	2023	–	–	–	–	–	–	–	–	–	–		Non-album singles
"2 Much 2 Handle" (with Steve Aoki)	2023	–	–	–	–	–	–	–	–	–	–		Non-album singles
"Car Keys (Ayla)" (with Ava Max)	2023	–	–	–	–	–	–	37	–	76	26		Non-album singles
"Drum Machine" (with Pickle)	2023	–	–	–	–	–	–	–	–	–	–		Non-album singles
"Jungle" (with the Chainsmokers and Mae Stephens)	2023	–	–	–	–	–	–	28	–	–	28		Sumertime Friends
"Let's Get Fkd Up" (with Ceres, Mondello featuring Tribbs)	2023	–	11	–	–	–	12	– (Note: "Let's Get Fkd Up" did not enter the Dutch Single Top 100, but peaked at number 25 on the Single Tip chart.)	–	–	–		Non-album singles
"Novela" (with Vinne and MC Lan)	2023	–	–	–	–	–	–	–	–	–	–		Non-album singles
"Warehouse" (with Bhaskar)	2023	–	–	–	–	–	–	–	–	–	–		Non-album singles
"Deep in Your Love" (with Bebe Rexha)	2024	–	–	–	–	–	–	57	–	– (Note: "Deep in Your Love" did not enter the Swedish Singellista Chart, but peaked at number nine on the Swedish Heatseeker Chart.)	11		Non-album singles
"Tsunami" (with Ely Oaks)	2024	–	–	–	–	–	–	–	–	–	–		Non-album singles
"Monster" (with A7S)	2024	–	–	–	–	–	–	–	–	–	–		Non-album singles
"Black Widow" (with Kickbait and Ceres)	2024	–	–	–	–	–	–	–	–	–	–		Non-album singles
"Sina Vaishu" (with Yawanawa Saiti Kaya)	2024	–	–	–	–	–	–	–	–	–	–		Non-album singles
"Under the Sun" (with Ella Henderson and Switch Disco)	2024	–	–	–	–	–	–	–	–	–	–		Non-album singles
"Summer's Back" (with Jess Glynne)	2024	–	–	–	–	–	–	–	–	–	–		Non-album singles
"Allein Allein" (with Innerse and Frey	2024	–	–	–	–	–	–	–	–	–	–		Non-album singles
"Why I Love You So" (with James Hurr & Supafly)	2024	–	–	–	–	–	–	–	–	–	–		Non-album singles
"The Heat" (with Jazzy)	2024	–	–	–	–	–	–	–	–	–	–		Non-album singles
"Never Letting Go" (with Gryffin and Julia Church)	2024	–	–	–	–	–	–	–	–	–	–		Non-album singles
"Higher State of Consciousness" (with Firebeatz)	2024	–	–	–	–	–	–	–	–	–	–		Non-album singles
"Driven by Love" (with Ayrton Senna)	2024	–	–	–	–	–	–	–	–	–	–		Non-album singles
"Looking for Love" (with Anitta)	2024	–	–	–	–	–	–	–	–	–	–		Non-album singles
"Body Talk" (with Clementine Douglas)	2024	–	–	–	–	–	–	–	–	–	–		Non-album singles
"Euphoria" (with Armin van Buuren, Norma Jean Martine and Lawrent)	2025	–	–	–	–	–	–	–	–	–	–		Non-album singles
"Last Night I Dreamt I Fell in Love" (with Kylie Minogue)	2025	–	–	–	–	–	–	–	–	–	–		Non-album singles
"Friday I'm in Luv" (with Alan Fitzpatrick)	2025	–	–	–	–	–	–	–	–	–	–		Non-album singles
"Don't Mess with the Fire"	2025	–	–	–	–	–	–	–	–	–	–		Non-album singles
"Unforgettable" (with Daecolm and Malou)	2025	–	–	–	–	–	–	–	–	–	–		Non-album singles
"Terminator" (with Solance)	2025	–	–	–	–	–	–	–	–	–	–		Non-album singles
"Truth, Peach, Love, Acid" (with Artbat)	2025	–	–	–	–	–	–	–	–	–	–		Non-album singles
"Forget You" (with James Carter and Barbz)	2025	–	–	–	–	–	–	–	–	–	–		Non-album singles
"To the Moon" (with Illenium)	2025	–	–	–	–	–	–	–	–	–	22		Non-album singles
"Mimosa (Now and Forever)" (with Dennis featuring Nyasia)	2025	–	–	–	–	–	–	–	–	–	–		Non-album singles
"Club Bizarre" (with Faithless, Sam Harper and Alex Christensen)	2026	–	–	–	–	–	–	–	–	–	–		Non-album singles
"Dive Into Me" (with Khalid)	2026	–	–	–	–	–	–	–	–	–	16		Non-album singles
"Flavour" (with Still Val)	2026	–	–	–	–	–	–	–	–	–	–		Non-album singles
"I Wonder if You Know" (with Something Else)	2026	–	–	–	–	–	–	–	–	–	–		Non-album singles
"Run Run River (Angels Above Me)" (with David Guetta and Stick Figure)	2026	–	57	–	–	–	–	–	–	– (Note: "Run Run River (Angels Above Me)" did not enter the Swedish Singles Chart, but peaked at number 1 on the Swedish Heatseeker chart.)	–		Non-album singles
"Everything's Fine" (AM & PM) (with Jennifer Lopez)	2026	–	–	–	–	–	–	–	–	–	–		Non-album singles
"Bye Bye Inhibitions" (with Nayeon)	2026	–	–	–	–	–	–	–	–	–	–		Non-album singles
"Weekend Warriors" (with DJ Glen and Icarus)	2026	–	–	–	–	–	–	–	–	–	–		Non-album singles
"All the People" (with Shimza and Ayra Starr)	2026	–	–	–	–	–	–	–	–	–	–		Non-album singles
"Monday" (with Zeeba and Carlo Dall Anese)	2026	–	–	–	–	–	–	–	–	–	–		
"—" denotes a single that did not chart or was not released in that territory.

=== As featured artist ===
Title	Year	Peak chart positions	Album
Title	Year	BRA	Album
"Paga de Solteiro Feliz" (Simone & Simaria featuring Alok)	2018	12	Non-album single

== Remixes ==
- 2019: Alok and Harrison — "Tell Me Why" (VIP Mix)
- 2020: Dua Lipa — "Physical" (Alok Remix)
- 2020: The Rolling Stones — "Living in a Ghost Town" (Alok Remix)
- 2021: Masked Wolf — "Astronaut in the Ocean" (Alok Remix)
- 2021: Slander featuring Dylan Matthew — "Love Is Gone" (Alok Remix)
- 2021: Joel Corry and Jax Jones — "Out Out" (featuring Charli XCX and Saweetie) (Alok Remix)
