= Moments (Marcus & Martinus album) =

Studio album by Marcus & Martinus
- Released: 17 November 2017
- Recorded: 2017
- Genre: Pop
- Language: English
- Label: Sony Music Entertainment

Marcus & Martinus chronology
Together (2016)	Moments (2017)	Soon (2019)

Singles from Moments
- 1. "Like It Like It" Released: 19 May 2017; 2. "First Kiss" Released: 23 June 2017; 3. "Dance with You" Released: 28 July 2017; 4. "Make You Believe in Love" Released: 29 September 2017; 5. "One Flight Away" Released: 3 November 2017; 6. "Never" Released: 15 November 2017; 7. "Remind Me" Released: 26 January 2018

Moments is the third studio album by Norwegian pop duo Marcus & Martinus. The album was released by Sony Music Entertainment on 17 November 2017 and peaked at number 1 on both the Norwegian VG-lista albums chart and the Swedish Sverigetopplistan albums chart.

== Singles ==
"Like It Like It" was released as the lead single from the album on 19 May 2017. The song has peaked at number 16 on the Norwegian Singles Chart and number 48 on the Swedish Singles Chart. "First Kiss" was released as the second single from the album on 23 June 2017. The song has peaked at number 15 on the Norwegian Singles Chart and number 52 on the Swedish Singles Chart. "Dance with You" was released as the third single from the album on 28 July 2017. The song has peaked at number 40 on the Norwegian Singles Chart and number 48 on the Swedish Singles Chart. "Make You Believe in Love" was released as the fourth single from the album on 29 September 2017. The song has peaked at number 34 on the Norwegian Singles Chart and number 47 on the Swedish Singles Chart. "One Flight Away" was released as the fifth single from the album on 3 November 2017. The song has peaked at number 20 on the Norwegian Singles Chart and number 79 on the Swedish Singles Chart. "Never" was released as the sixth single from the album on 15 November 2017. "Remind Me" was released as the seventh single from the album on 26 January 2018. The song has peaked at number 40 on the Norwegian Singles Chart and number 63 on the Swedish Singles Chart.

== Track listing ==
Moments track listing (Deluxe edition)
No.	Title	Writer(s)	Producer(s)	Length
1.	"Make You Believe in Love"	Daniel Bedingfield; RedOne; T.I. Jakke; Jesse St. John Geller	RedOne; T.I. Jakke	3:32
2.	"Please Don't Go"	Thomas Eriksen; Sam Martin; Scott Harris; Sasha Sloan	Earwulf	3:22
3.	"Next to Me"	Andreas Levander; Joy Deb; Linnea Samuelsson	The Family	3:23
4.	"One Flight Away"	Linnea Deb; Elias Näslin; Marcus Gunnarsen	Elias Näslin	2:59
5.	"Never"	Christoffer Vikberg; Björn Djupström; Tobias Frelin; Omar Samuel Pasley	The Beast	3:10
6.	"Get to Know Ya"	Hayley Gene Penner; Mikhail Beltran; Omar Tavarez; Angélica Rahe Pozo-DesPortes; Ethan Carlson	SadMoney	2:53
7.	"Guitar"	Erik Fjeld; Ida Wærdahl	Erik Fjeld	3:22
8.	"Dance with You"	Kristoffer Tømmerbakke; Erik Smaaland	GoToGuy	3:21
9.	"First Kiss"	Jesper Borgen; Magnus Bertelsen; Oda Evjen Gjøvåg	Jesper Borgen; Magnus Bertelsen	3:09
10.	"Like It Like It" (featuring Silentó)	Björn Djupström; Tobias Frelin; Ricky Lamar Hawk	The Beast	2:54
11.	"Remind Me"	Alexander Pavelich; Cato Sundberg; Kent Sundberg; Marcus Gunnarsen; Martinus Gunnarsen; Tommy Kristiansen	Rat City	3:26
12.	"Make You Believe in Love" (AronChupa Remix)	Daniel Bedingfield; RedOne; T.I. Jakke; Jesse St. John Geller	RedOne; T.I. Jakke	2:58
13.	"Make You Believe in Love" (Live with The Norwegian Radio Orchestra)	Daniel Bedingfield; RedOne; T.I. Jakke; Jesse St. John Geller	RedOne; T.I. Jakke	3:26

== Charts ==
Chart performance for Moments
Chart (2017–2018)	Peak position
Austrian Albums (Ö3 Austria)	51
Belgian Albums (Ultratop Flanders)	173
Croatian International Albums (HDU)	1
Danish Albums (Hitlisten)	3
Finnish Albums (Suomen virallinen lista)	2
Dutch Albums (Album Top 100)	98
Norwegian Albums (VG-lista)	1
Polish Albums (ZPAV)	49
Spanish Albums (PROMUSICAE)	34
Swedish Albums (Sverigetopplistan)	1

== Release history ==
Release history and formats for Moments
Region	Date	Format	Label
Norway	17 November 2017	Digital download	Sony Music Entertainment
