= Elektrisk =

Single by Marcus & Martinus featuring Katastrofe

from the album Hei (Fan Spesial)
- Released: 24 July 2015
- Genre: Pop
- Length: 3:20
- Label: Sony Music

Marcus & Martinus singles chronology
"Plystre på deg" (2015)	"Elektrisk" (2015)	"Ei som deg" (2015)

Katastrofe singles chronology
"Hinanden ikke" (2015)	"Elektrisk" (2015)	"Typisk norsk" (2015)

"Elektrisk" is a song by Norwegian pop duo Marcus & Martinus featuring vocals from Katastrofe. The song was released as a digital download in Norway on 24 July 2015 through Sony Music as the second single from their re-released debut studio album Hei (2015). The song peaked at number 3 on the Norwegian Singles Chart and number 8 on the Swedish Singles Chart.

== Charts ==
Weekly chart performance for "Elektrisk"
Chart (2015)	Peak position
Norway (VG-lista)	3
Sweden (Sverigetopplistan)	8

== Certifications ==
Certifications for "Elektrisk"
Region	Certification	Certified units/sales
Norway (IFPI Norway)	7× Platinum	420,000^{‡}
^{‡} Sales+streaming figures based on certification alone.

== Release history ==
Release history and formats for "Elektrisk"
Region	Date	Format	Label
Norway	24 July 2015	Digital download; streaming	Sony Music
