= Girls (Marcus & Martinus song) =

Single by Marcus & Martinus featuring Madcon

from the album Together
- Released: 20 May 2016
- Recorded: 2015
- Genre: Pop
- Length: 3:28
- Label: Sony Music
- Songwriter(s): Tommy La Verdi; Yosef Woldemariam; Tshawe Baqwa; Magnus Bertelsen; Erik Fjeld; Ida Wærdahl
- Producer(s): Magnus Bertelsen; Erik Fjeld

Marcus & Martinus singles chronology
"Alt jeg ønsker meg" (2015)	"Girls" (2016)	"Heartbeat" (2016)

Madcon singles chronology
"Limousine" (2016)	"Girls" (2016)	"Don't Stop Loving Me" (2016)

"Girls" is a song by Norwegian pop duo Marcus & Martinus featuring vocals from Madcon. The song was released as a digital download in Norway on 20 May 2016 through Sony Music as the lead single from their second studio album Together (2016). The song peaked at number one on the Norwegian Singles Chart and number 40 on the Swedish Singles Chart.

== Music video ==
A video to accompany the release of "Girls" was first released onto YouTube on 22 May 2016 at a total length of three minutes and thirty-four seconds.

== Charts ==
Chart performance for "Girls"
Chart (2016)	Peak position
Norway (VG-lista)	1
Sweden (Sverigetopplistan)	40

== Release history ==
Release history and formats for "Girls"
Region	Date	Format	Label
Norway	20 May 2016	Digital download; streaming	Sony Music
