= Together (Marcus & Martinus album) =

Studio album by Marcus & Martinus
- Released: November 4, 2016
- Genre: Pop
- Length: 37:09
- Language: English
- Label: Sony Music

Marcus & Martinus chronology
Hei (2015)	Together (2016)	Moments (2017)

Singles from Together
- 1. "Girls" Released: 20 May 2016; 2. "Heartbeat" Released: 24 May 2016; 3. "I Don't Wanna Fall in Love" Released: 27 May 2016; 4. "Light It Up" Released: 29 July 2016; 5. "One More Second" Released: 20 October 2016; 6. "Go Where You Go" Released: 28 October 2016; 7. "Without You" Released: 2 November 2016; 8. "Bae" Released: 4 March 2017

Together is the second album by Norwegian pop duo Marcus & Martinus. It is their first full-length studio album in English. The album was released by Sony Music on 4 November 2016 and debuted at number 1 on both the Norwegian VG-lista official albums chart and the Swedish Sverigetopplistan albums chart.

== Singles ==
"Girls" was released as the lead single from the album on 20 May 2016. The song has peaked at number 1 on the Norwegian Singles Chart and number 40 on the Swedish Singles Chart. "Heartbeat" was released as the second single from the album on 24 May 2016. The song has peaked at number 21 on the Norwegian Singles Chart and number 61 on the Swedish Singles Chart. "I Don't Wanna Fall in Love" was released as the third single from the album on 27 May 2016. The song has peaked at number 37 on the Norwegian Singles Chart. "Light It Up" was released as the fourth single from the album on 29 July 2016. The song has peaked at number 9 on the Norwegian Singles Chart and number 23 on the Swedish Singles Chart. "One More Second" was released as the fifth single from the album on 20 October 2016. The song has peaked at number 30 on the Norwegian Singles Chart and number 57 on the Swedish Singles Chart. "Go Where You Go" was released as the sixth single from the album on 28 October 2016. "Without You" was released as the seventh single from the album on 2 November 2016. "Bae" was released as the eighth single from the album on 4 March 2017. The song did not enter the Swedish Singles Chart, but peaked to number 1 on the Sweden Heatseeker Songs.

== Track listing ==
Standard edition
No.	Title	Writer(s)	Producer(s)	Length
1.	"Girls" (featuring Madcon)	Magnus Bertelsen; Erik Fjeld; La Verdi; Ida Wærdahl; Yosef Woldemariam; Tshawe Baqwa	Magnus Bertelsen; Erik Fjeld	3:28
2.	"Without You"	Magnus Bertelsen; Jimmy Burney; Anderz Wrethov; Joseph Lee; La Verdi; Kristian Rønningen	Magnus Bertelsen; Jesper Borgen	3:12
3.	"Light It Up" (featuring Samantha J)	Erik Fjeld; Ida Wærdahl; Nathaniel Anthony Hewitt; Anthony Webb	Erik Fjeld	3:14
4.	"One More Second"	Magnus Bertelsen; Jesper Borgen; Marcus Ulstad Nilsen; La Verdi	Magnus Bertelsen; Erik Fjeld; Marcus Ulstad Nilsen; Jens Hjertø; Andreas Sjo Engen	3:21
5.	"Heartbeat"	Magnus Bertelsen; Erik Fjeld	Magnus Bertelsen; Erik Fjeld	2:45
6.	"Go Where You Go"	Magnus Bertelsen; Martinus Gunnarsen; La Verdi	Magnus Bertelsen; Robbin Söderlund	2:54
7.	"Hey You"	Magnus Bertelsen; Erik Fjeld; Jesper Borgen; Magnus Clausen	Magnus Bertelsen; Erik Fjeld	2:46
8.	"Bae"	Magnus Bertelsen; Jesper Borgen; Oda Evjen Gjøvåg; La Verdi; Ulstad Nilsen	Magnus Bertelsen	3:04
9.	"I Don't Wanna Fall in Love"	Magnus Bertelsen; Erik Fjeld; Jesper Borgen; Magnus Clausen	Magnus Bertelsen; Erik Fjeld	3:11
10.	"Together"	Magnus Bertelsen; Jesper Borgen; Oda Evjen Gjøvåg; Ulstad Nilsen	Magnus Bertelsen	2:47
11.	"Girls" (featuring Madcon) (Alex Mattson Remix)	Magnus Bertelsen; Erik Fjeld; La Verdi; Ida Wærdahl; Yosef Woldemariam; Tshawe Baqwa		3:10
12.	"Heartbeat" (Maybon Remix)	Magnus Bertelsen; Erik Fjeld		3:17

== Charts ==
=== Weekly charts ===
Weekly chart performance for Together
Chart (2016–2017)	Peak position
Danish Albums (Hitlisten)	11
Finnish Albums (Suomen virallinen lista)	14
Norwegian Albums (VG-lista)	1
Polish Albums (ZPAV)	19
Swedish Albums (Sverigetopplistan)	1

=== Year-end charts ===
Year-end chart performance for Together
Chart (2016)	Position
Swedish Albums (Sverigetopplistan)	51
Chart (2017)	Position
Danish Albums (Hitlisten)	36
Swedish Albums (Sverigetopplistan)	17

== Release history ==
Release history and formats for Together
Region	Date	Format	Label
Norway	4 November 2016	Digital download	Sony Music
