= Like It Like It =

Single by Marcus & Martinus featuring Silentó

from the album Moments
- Released: 19 May 2017
- Recorded: 2016
- Genre: Pop
- Length: 2:55
- Label: Sony Music

Marcus & Martinus singles chronology
| "Bae" (2017) | "Like It Like It" (2017) | "First Kiss" (2017) |

Silentó singles chronology
| "Slide" (2017) | "Like It Like It" (2017) |

Music video
- "Like It Like It" on YouTube

"Like It Like It" is a song by Norwegian pop duo Marcus & Martinus featuring vocals from American rapper Silentó. The song was released as a digital download in Norway on 19 May 2017 by Sony Music. The song peaked at number 16 on the Norwegian Singles Chart and number 48 on the Swedish Singles Chart.

== Music video ==
A video to accompany the release of "Like It Like It" was first released onto YouTube on 21 May 2017 at a total length of two minutes and fifty-five seconds.

== Charts ==
Chart performance for "Like It Like It"
| Chart (2017) | Peak position |
|---|---|
| Norway (VG-lista) | 16 |
| Sweden (Sverigetopplistan) | 48 |

== Release history ==
Release history and formats for "Like It Like It"
| Region | Date | Format | Label |
|---|---|---|---|
| Norway | 19 May 2017 | Digital download; streaming | Sony Music |
