= Hei (album) =

2015 debut studio album by Marcus & Martinus

Studio album by Marcus & Martinus
- Released: 23 February 2015
- Recorded: 2012–2015
- Genre: Pop
- Length: 31:36
- Language: Norwegian
- Label: Sony Music Entertainment

Marcus & Martinus chronology
Hei (2015)	Together (2016)

Singles from Hei
- 1. "To dråper vann" Released: 2012; 2. "Leah" Released: 25 July 2013; 3. "Du" Released: 2014; 4. "Smil" Released: October 2014; 5. "Plystre på deg" Released: 17 February 2015

Hei – Fan-Spesial

Studio album by Marcus & Martinus
- Released: 6 November 2015
- Recorded: 2012–2015
- Genre: Pop
- Length: 51:13
- Language: Norwegian
- Label: Sony Music Entertainment

Singles from Hei – Fan-Spesial
- 1. "Elektrisk" Released: 24 July 2015; 2. "Ei som deg" Released: 25 September 2015; 3. "Alt jeg ønsker meg" Released: 30 October 2015

Hei is the debut album of the Norwegian teen duo Marcus & Martinus, winners of the Norwegian Melodi Grand Prix Junior 2012. The album released on Sony Music Entertainment on 23 February 2015 and was successful, peaking at number 1 on the Norwegian Albums Chart. A special follow-up album was released nine months later on 6 November 2015 also on Sony including additional tracks. The special edition was titled Hei – Fan-Spesial.

== Singles ==
"To dråper vann" was released as the lead single from the album in 2012. The song has peaked to number 8 on the Norwegian Singles Chart. "Leah" was released as the second single from the album on 25 July 2013. "Du" was released as the third single from the album in 2014. "Smil" was released as the fourth single from the album in October 2014. "Plystre på deg" was released as the fifth single from the album on 17 February 2015. "Elektrisk" was released as the lead single from the re-released album on 24 July 2015. The song has peaked to number 3 on the Norwegian Singles Chart and number 8 on the Swedish Singles Chart. "Ei som deg" was released as the second single from the re-released album on 25 September 2015. The song has peaked to number 15 on the Norwegian Singles Chart. "Alt jeg ønsker meg" was released as the third single from the re-released album on 30 October 2015.

== Track listing ==
Standard edition
No.	Title	Length
1.	"Plystre på deg"	3:03
2.	"Blikkstille"	3:21
3.	"Hei"	3:09
4.	"Slalom"	3:09
5.	"Ekko"	2:55
6.	"Gæærn"	3:23
7.	"Leah"	3:13
8.	"Du"	3:39
9.	"Smil"	2:59
10.	"To dråper vann"	2:45

Hei – Fan-Spesial
No.	Title	Length
1.	"Elektrisk"	3:20
2.	"Ei som deg"	3:23
3.	"Na Na Na"	2:53
4.	"Plystre på deg"	3:03
5.	"Blikkstille"	3:20
6.	"Hei"	3:08
7.	"Slalom"	3:09
8.	"Ekko"	2:54
9.	"Gæærn"	3:22
10.	"Leah"	3:12
11.	"Du"	3:38
12.	"Smil"	2:59
13.	"To dråper vann"	2:44
14.	"Plystre på deg" (acoustic)	3:29
15.	"Gæærn" (acoustic)	3:08
16.	"Alt jeg ønsker meg"	3:31

== Charts ==
=== Weekly charts ===
Weekly chart performance for Hei
Chart (2015–2016)	Peak position
Norwegian Albums (VG-lista)	1
Swedish Albums (Sverigetopplistan)	2

=== Year-end charts ===
Year-end chart performance for Hei
Chart (2016)	Position
Swedish Albums (Sverigetopplistan)	9
Chart (2017)	Position
Swedish Albums (Sverigetopplistan)	36

== Certifications ==
Certifications for Hei
Region	Certification	Certified units/sales
Norway (IFPI Norway) Fan spesial version	6× Platinum	120,000^{‡}
^{‡} Sales+streaming figures based on certification alone.

== Release history ==
Release history and formats for Hei
Region	Date	Format	Label
Norway	23 February 2015	Digital download	Sony Music Entertainment
