= Marcus & Martinus =

Norwegian dance-pop duo

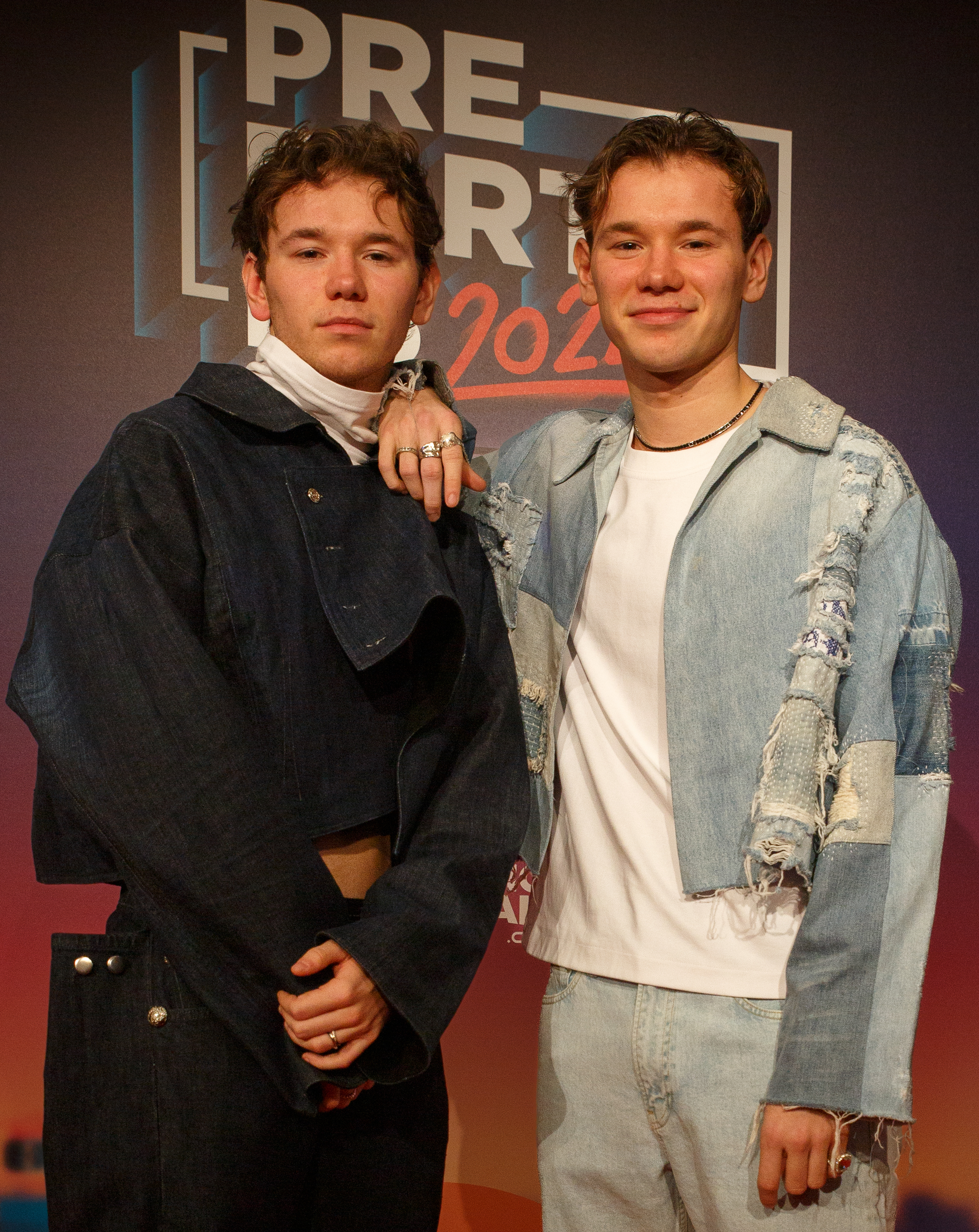
- Marcus (left) and Martinus (right) in 2024

Background information
- Also known as: M&M
- Born: 21 February 2002 (age 24); Elverum, Hedmark, Norway
- Origin: Trofors, Nordland, Norway
- Genres: Dance-pop; pop-rap
- Instruments: Vocals; piano; guitar
- Years active: 2012–present
- Label: Universal Music
- Members: Marcus Gunnarsen; Martinus Gunnarsen
- Website: marcusandmartinus.com

Marcus & Martinus, occasionally known as M&M, are a Norwegian dance-pop duo consisting of identical twin brothers Marcus and Martinus Gunnarsen. They have released five studio albums: Hei, Together, Moments, Unforgettable and The Room. Since winning Melodi Grand Prix Junior in 2012, they have won numerous prizes, such as Spellemannprisen in 2017 and Rockbjörnen 'Group of the Year' in 2024. The duo won Masked Singer Sverige in 2022, and participated in Melodifestivalen in 2023 and 2024. They won the 2024 edition of Melodifestivalen and represented host nation Sweden in the Eurovision Song Contest 2024 in Malmö with the song "Unforgettable".

== Biography ==
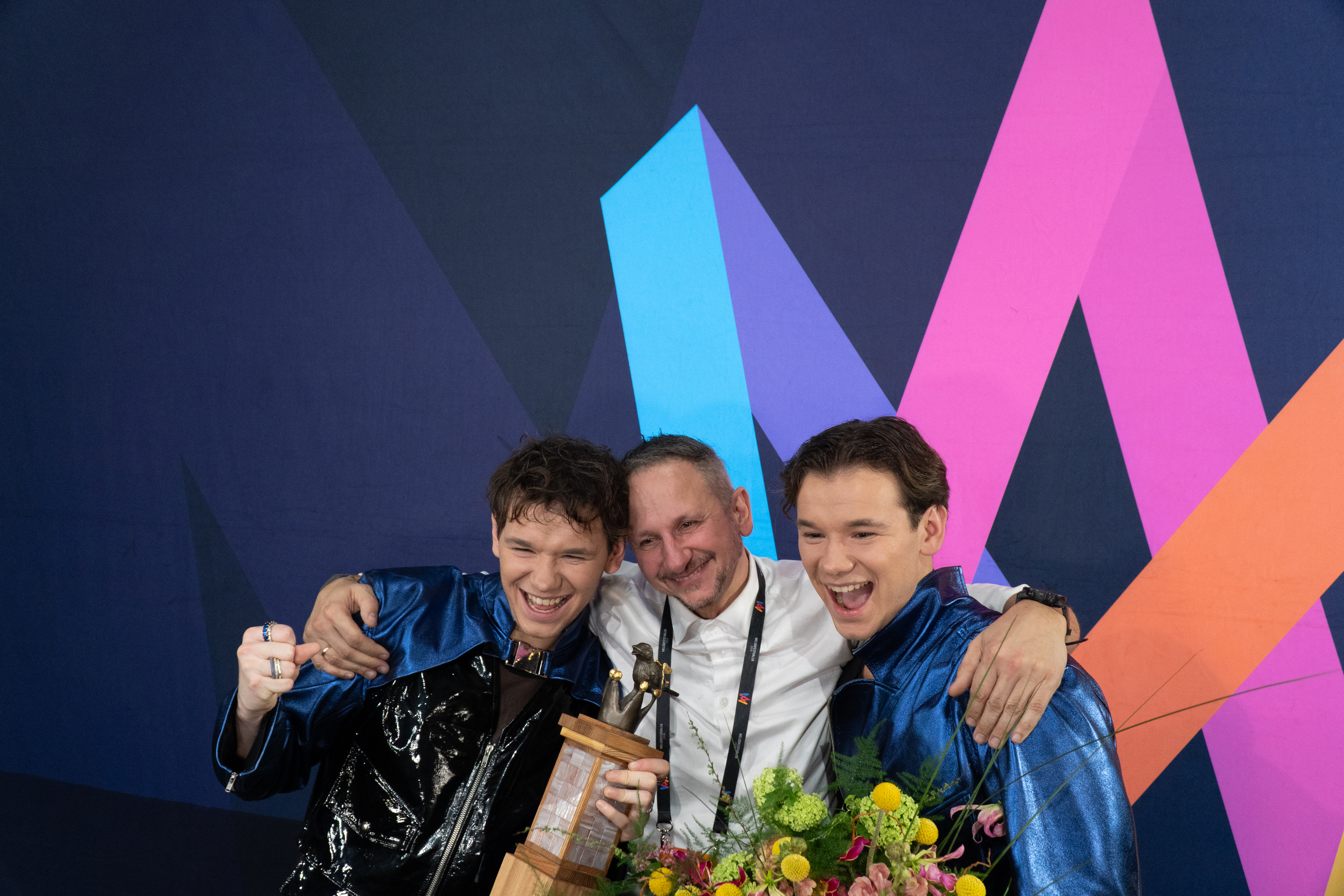
Marcus & Martinus with their father Kjell-Erik Gunnarsen

Born 21st February 2002 in Elverum, Marcus and Martinus Gunnarsen are identical twins, the middle children of Kjell-Erik and the first children of Gerd Anne Gunnarsen. Marcus is the older twin, having been born fifteen minutes ahead of Martinus. They have an older half-sister on their father’s side, and a younger sister (Emma Gunnarsen).

They spent their early life and attended school in Trofors, Norway, where they lived until they relocated to Trondheim at the end of 2025.

== Career ==
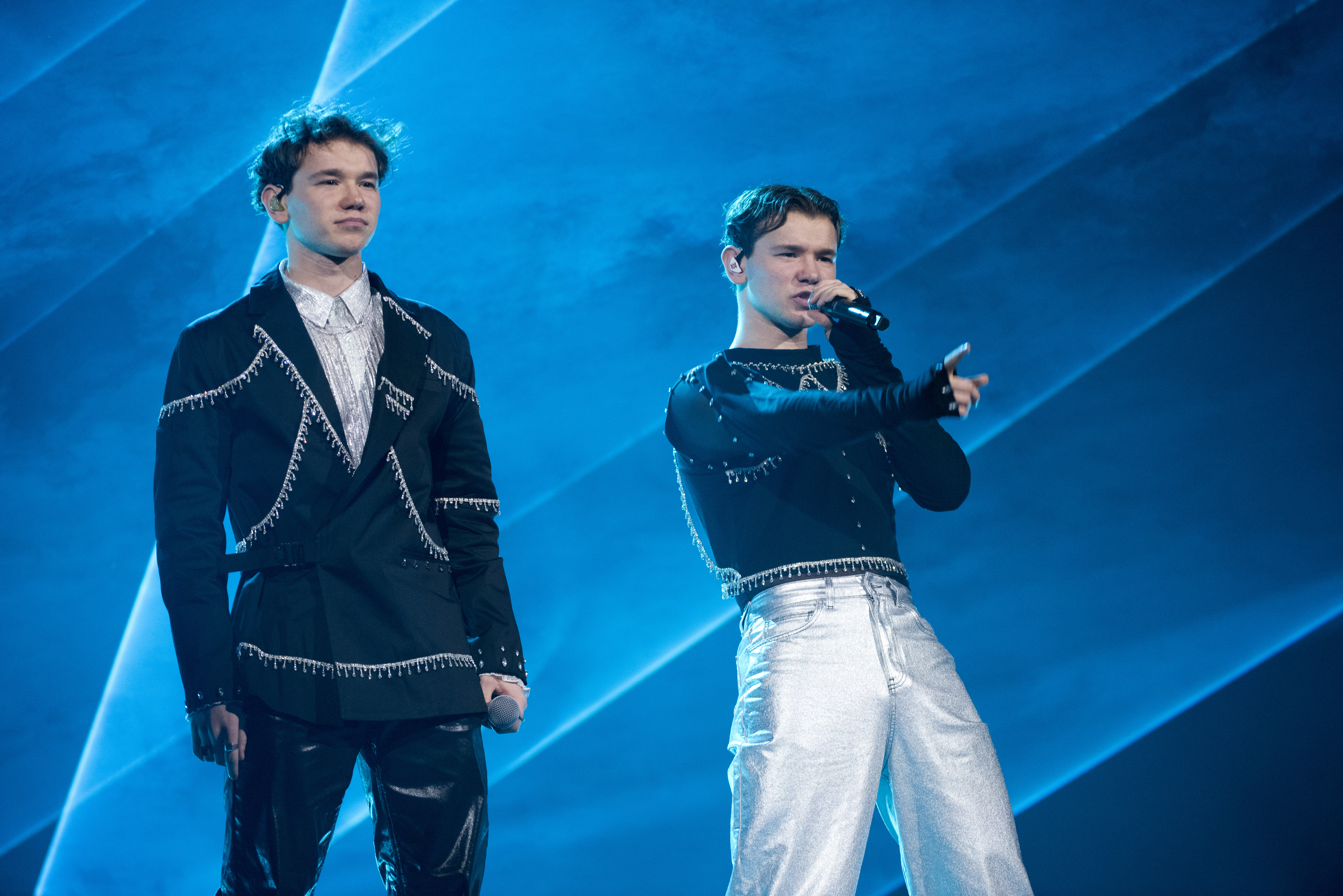
Marcus & Martinus performing in Melodifestivalen 2023.

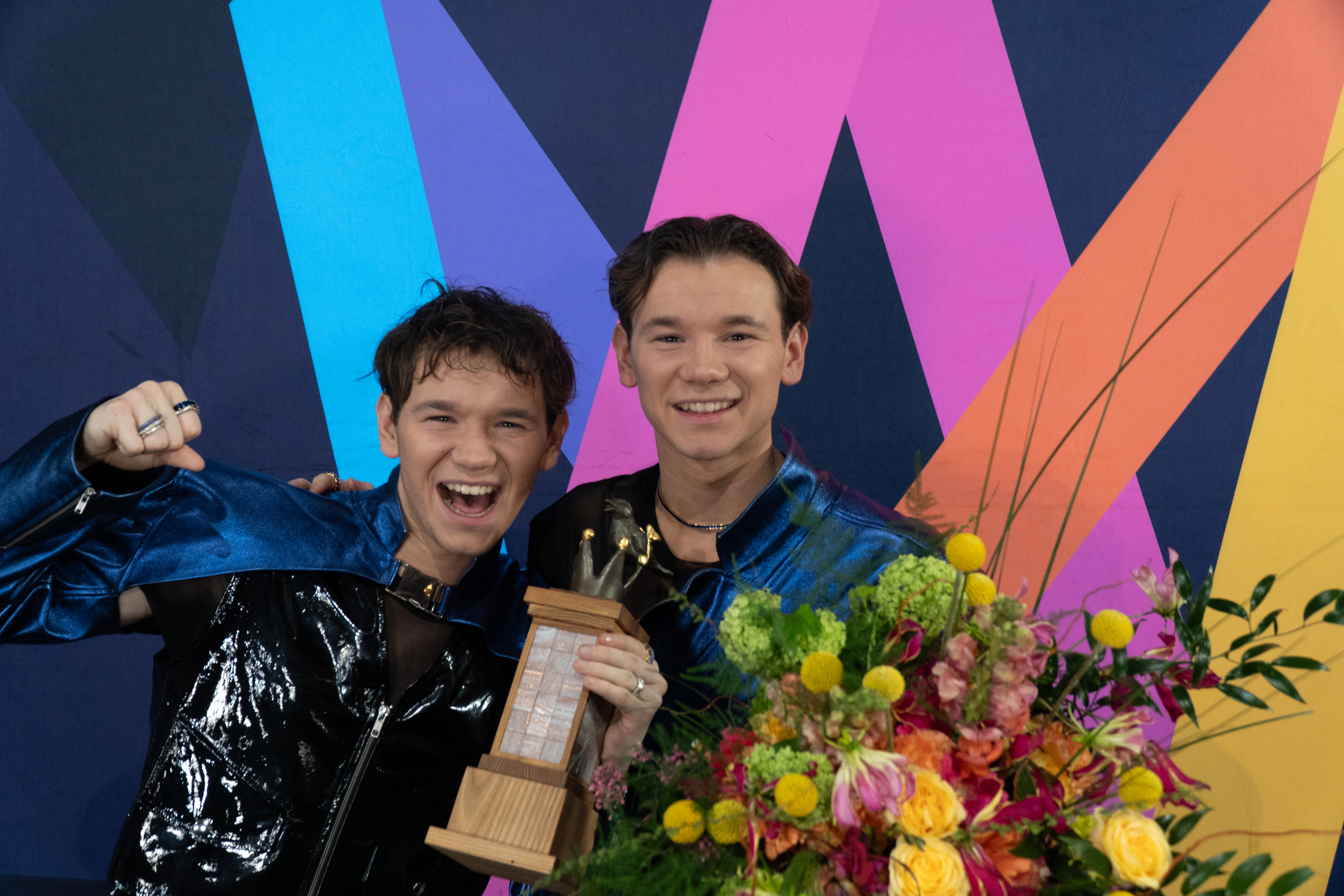
Winning image from Melodifestivalen 2024.

=== 2012: Debut and Melodi Grand Prix Junior ===
In 2012, Marcus and Martinus were contestants on the eleventh season of Melodi Grand Prix Junior. It was held at the Oslo Spektrum in Oslo, Norway, and was broadcast live by NRK, hosted by Margrethe Røed and Tooji. They won the contest with the song "To dråper vann" (English: "Two Drops of Water"). The song peaked at number eight on the Norwegian Singles Chart.

=== 2015–2016: Hei and Together ===
On 23 February 2015, they released their debut studio album Hei (English: Hi). The album peaked at number 1 on the Norwegian Albums Chart in week 46 of 2015 (15 November 2015) after having charted for 35 weeks, the last 20 not leaving the top ten. The album includes the single "Plystre på deg" (English: "Whistle at You"). On 24 July 2015, they released the single "Elektrisk" (English: "Electric"), featuring vocals from Katastrofe. The song peaked at number 3 on the Norwegian Singles Chart. On 25 September 2015, they released the single "Ei som deg" (English: "One Like You") with Innertier. The song peaked at number 15 on the Norwegian Singles Chart. On 6 November they released the second version of their album Hei, "Hei (Fan Special)" with the same songs and some extras, one of the extras is Elektrisk. In May 2016, the duo released three singles. The first, "Girls", featuring Madcon, debuted at number 1 in Norway and became their second single to reach the top 100 in Sweden after "Elektrisk". The second and third, "Heartbeat" and "I Don't Wanna Fall in Love", followed just days after the release of "Girls" and debuted at numbers 21 and 37, respectively. They followed up "Girls" with the singles "Light It Up" and "One More Second". In November 2016, they released their first English album titled Together. The album includes their hit songs "Girls", "Heartbeat", "Light It Up" and "One More Second". In the week after its release, Together debuted at number 1 in Norway and Sweden and number 6 in Finland. As the Young Talent Act of the 2016 Nobel Peace Prize Concert, they performed "Without You" and "Bae" at Telenor Arena in Norway on 11 December 2016.

=== 2017–2021: Moments ===
On the 28 January 2017, Marcus and Martinus were one of the interval acts at the Finnish selection Uuden Musiikin Kilpailu for Eurovision Song Contest 2017 performing a medley of their songs "Bae", "Light It Up" and "Girls". In March, they release "Bae (Remixes)" as their first EP. On the 13 May, Marcus and Martinus announced the Jury points for Norway in the Eurovision Song Contest 2017. On 21 May 2017, they released the single "Like It Like It" alongside American rapper Silentó. On 1 July, they released the single "First Kiss". The same month, on 14 July, they performed on Swedish Crown Princess Victoria's 40th birthday with their own song, "On This Day", written especially for her. In late July, they released the single "Dance with You". On 15 October 2017, they released their single "Make You Believe in Love". The single reached 34th place in Norway and 47th place in Sweden. It also featured in CelebMix's 21 songs by Under-21s in 2018. On 4 November 2017, they released their single "One Flight Away". On 15 November they released their single "Never". On 17 November, they released their third album Moments. On 27 September 2018, they released their single "Invited".

In 2019, they released an EP called Soon. In 2020, they have released two singles, "Love You Less", and "It's Christmas Time". In 2021, they were featured on the song "Miserabel" by Stig Brenner. Furthermore, Marcus & Martinus released the single "Belinda" together with Latin artist Alex Rose, which reached 20th place on the Norwegian Singles Chart. In November, they released the song "Feel" alongside Bruno Martini.

=== 2022–present: The Masked Singer Sweden, Melodifestivalen and Eurovision ===
In spring 2022 they won the Swedish version of Masked Singer, being the first duo sharing first place. In addition the duo released their first single in 2022 called "When All The Lights Go Out".

In 2023, they entered Melodifestivalen 2023 with the song "Air", ultimately finishing in second place behind Loreen's "Tattoo". "Air" went on to win the OGAE Second Chance Contest for 2023 giving Sweden its 19th victory overall with Norway and Finland rounding out the top three. They again participated in Melodifestivalen 2024 with the song "Unforgettable". On 9 March, the duo won Melodifestivalen with 177 points, and represented host nation Sweden in the Eurovision Song Contest 2024 in Malmö. In the final the duo placed ninth with 174 points. After Eurovision, they released the album Unforgettable on 31 May 2024, which contained the singles they have been publishing the past few years, including a couple of new songs. On 25 October 2024, the duo released the single "Another Life" with VIZE, followed by "Wonder" in January 2025, "Endless Summer" in May and "The Room" in September. All these new singles, along with "Christmas to Me" (from 2023) are part of a new album released on 14 November 2025, titled The Room. In early 2026, the duo appeared on the Norwegian TV program Hver gang vi møtes, and released the songs Nattevandrer, Ta meg Tilbake, Den fystre song (feat. Katastrofe), Her vil er vær (feat. Isah), ok Rosa blomst, Jente I fra byn, I natt (feat. Hagle), and Nochalant (feat. Synne Vo). They then later released Moonlight, with German song artist, Leony. Then, on the 12th of June, they released How you know.

== Personal life ==
Marcus is currently in a relationship with Nora Fossland Gartland since August 2022.

== Discography ==
Studio albums

- Hei (2015)
- Together (2016)
- Moments (2017)
- Unforgettable (2024)
- The Room (2025)

Live albums

- The Room — Live Recording from The Room Tour (2026)

Extended plays

- Bae (Remixes) (2017)
- Soon (2019)

== Filmography ==
=== Films ===
Year	Title	Role	Running time	Note	Ref.
2017	Sammen om drømmen	Themselves	86 min (1 hr, 26 min)	Documentary for standard release	
2017	Marcus & Martinus - Når barn blir popstjerner	Themselves	44 min (0 hr, 44 min)	Television documentary on TVNorge and DPlay	

=== Television ===
Year	Title	Role	# of episodes	Note	Ref.
2015	MMsnutt	Themselves	6 (Season 1)	Docuseries on DPlay	
2016	MMnews	Themselves	8 (Season 1)	News satire on DPlay	
2017	Marcus & Martinus	Themselves	6 (Season 1)	Docuseries on TVNorge	
2024	Marcus & Martinus: Resan till Eurovision	Themselves	4 (Season 1)	Docuseries on SVT	

== Tours ==
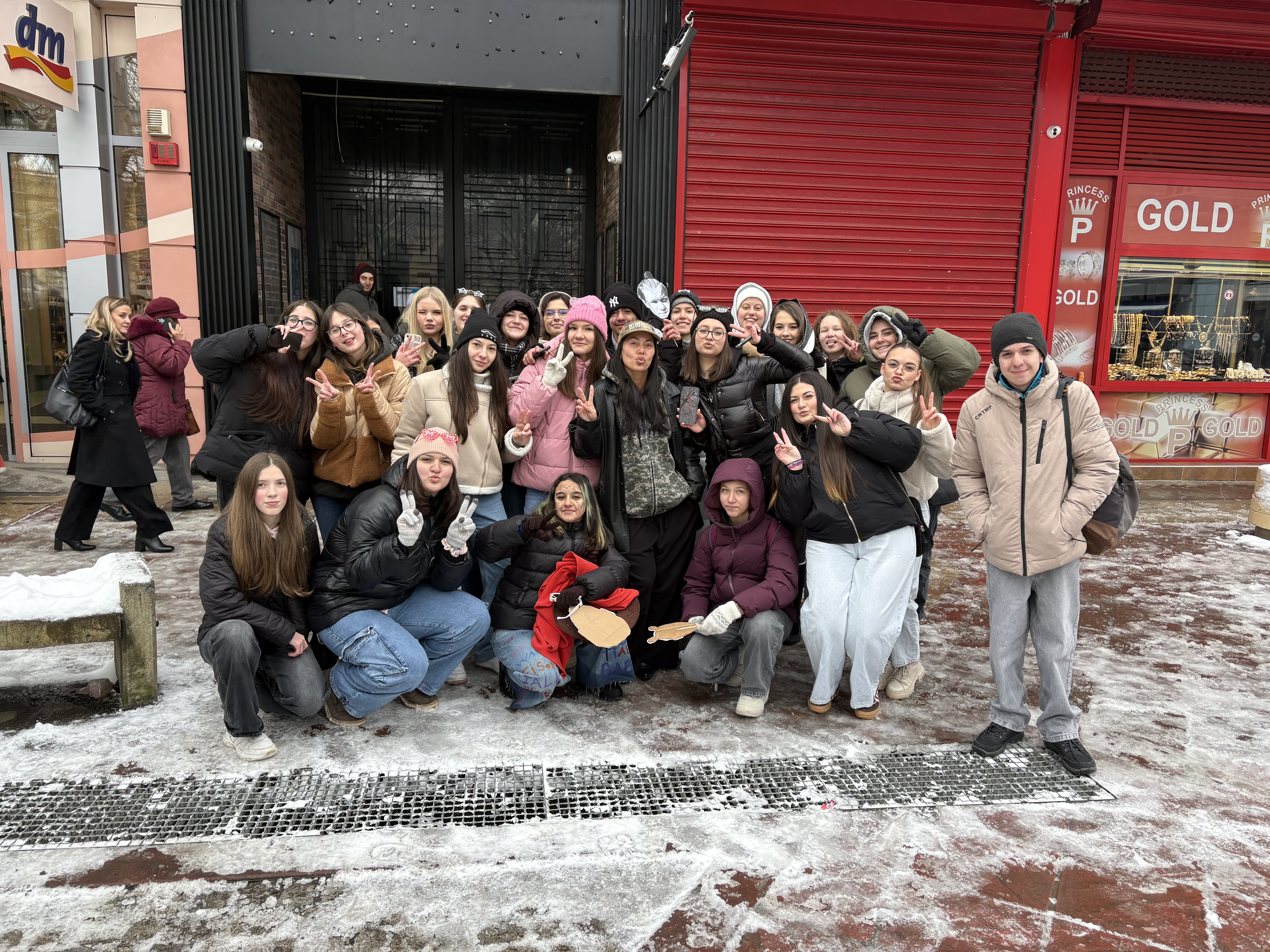
Bulgarian Marcus & Martinus fandom at the queue for the European Tour 2026

Headlining

- Together Tour (2016–2017)
- Moments Tour (2018)
- We Are Not the Same Tour (2024—2025)
- European tour/The Room tour (2026)

Supporting

- Jason Derulo – 2Sides Tour (2018)

Others

- MGP Jr. Juleturnè (2012)
- Vinterlyd (2013–2016)
- MGP Jr. Julekonserter (2013)
- P4 og Redd Barnas Sommerturne (2014)

== Awards and nominations ==
Year	Award	Category	Nominee(s)	Result	Ref.
2016	Spellemannprisen '15	Popgruppe (Pop Group)	Hei	Nominated	
2016	Spellemannprisen '15	Årets Låt (Song of the Year)	"Elektrisk"	Nominated	
2016	Spellemannprisen '15	Årets nykommer (Newcomer of the Year)	Themselves	Nominated	
2017	Spellemannprisen '16	Årets Låt (Song of the Year)	"Girls"	Nominated	
2017	Spellemannprisen '16	Årets Spellemann (Spellemann of the Year)	Themselves	Won	
2017	NRK Nordland	Årets Nordlending (Northerner of the Year)	Themselves	Won	
2017	Bravo magazine	Bravo Otto	Themselves	Won	
2018	MAD Video Music Awards	Best International Act	Themselves	Won	
2024	Rockbjörnen	Årets grupp (Group of the Year)	Themselves	Won	
2024	Eurovision Awards	Miss Congeniality	Themselves	Nominated	
2024	Eurovision Awards	Choreo Monarch	Themselves	Won	
2024	Eurovision Awards	Most Rizz	Themselves	Nominated	

Awards and achievements
Preceded by Loreen with "Tattoo"	Sweden in the Eurovision Song Contest; 2024	Succeeded by KAJ with "Bara bada bastu"
Preceded by (Sweden) Medina	OGAE Second Chance Contest winner 2023	Succeeded by (Italy) Annalisa
