= Unforgettable (Marcus & Martinus song) =

2024 single by Marcus & Martinus

Single by Marcus & Martinus

from the album Unforgettable
- Released: 2 March 2024
- Genre: Electropop, EDM
- Length: 2:48
- Label: Universal
- Composers: Jimmy "Joker" Thörnfeldt; Joy Deb
- Lyricists: Linnea Deb; Marcus Gunnarsen; Martinus Gunnarsen
- Producers: Jimmy "Joker" Thörnfeldt; Joy Deb

Marcus & Martinus singles chronology
"We Are Not the Same" (2024)	"Unforgettable" (2024)	"Another Life" (2024)

Eurovision Song Contest 2024 entry
- Country: Sweden
- Artist: Marcus & Martinus
- Language: English

Finals performance
- Final result: 9th
- Final points: 174

Entry chronology
- ◄ "Tattoo" (2023)
- "Bara bada bastu" (2025) ►

Official performance video
- "Unforgettable" (First Semi-Final) on YouTube "Unforgettable" (Grand Final) on YouTube

"Unforgettable" is a song by Norwegian music duo Marcus & Martinus, released as a single on 2 March 2024 through Universal. The song was written by the duo along with Jimmy "Joker" Thörnfeldt, Joy Deb and Linnea Deb. It represented Sweden in the Eurovision Song Contest 2024 after winning Melodifestivalen 2024, and finished in 9th place at the grand final with 174 points.

The song was described as a "tale" of a relationship with a dangerous female lover, with the lover taking over their body and hypnotizing them. The song was met with mixed reception from Eurovision critics, who noted its similar polished pop style to Sweden's past Eurovision entries. "Unforgettable" saw commercial success, reaching number one on the Sverigetopplistan chart and becoming Marcus & Martinus's first chart-topping song in Sweden.

== Background and composition ==
"Unforgettable" was written by Marcus Gunnarsen, Martinus Gunnarsen, Jimmy Thörnfeldt, Joy Deb, and Linnea Deb. The song has been described as a "tale" of a dangerous relationship with a female lover who is known as "venomous". Despite this, the other in the relationship ends up "in too deep" and suggest that they have been hypnotized by the woman, losing control of their body. Although they can detect the dangers of the relationship, they still describe the woman as "unforgettable".

According to the duo, they entered Melodifestivalen 2024 rather than the Norwegian Melodi Grand Prix because Melodifestivalen was a larger competition in terms of production and television ratings. They had previously competed in the 2023 edition of Melodifestivalen, where they came second. As a result of their result in 2023, the duo sought "revenge".

== Promotion ==
To promote the song, the duo announced their intents to participate in various Eurovision pre-parties, including Pre-Party ES 2024, the London Eurovision Party 2024, Eurovision in Concert 2024, and the Nordic Eurovision Party 2024.

== Critical reception ==
"Unforgettable" was met with mixed reception. In a Wiwibloggs review containing several reviews from several critics, the song was rated 7.53 out of 10 points, earning eighth on the site's annual ranking. Vulture's Jon O'Brien ranked the song as sixth out of 37 entries, dubbing it an "immaculately produced dance-pop banger" and an "instant streaming hit", but wondered if it could be "just that little too polished". ESC Beat's Doron Lahav ranked the song 25th overall, stating that while he found the song to be "very modern and even fashionable", he admitted that he "felt like it was too cooked or even 'over transgenic'". Erin Adam of The Scotsman rated the song seven out of 10 points, stating that while Sweden had not strayed from choosing "'by the numbers' clinical pop", she wrote that "its beat and polish can't be denied".

== Eurovision Song Contest ==
=== Melodifestivalen 2024 ===
Sweden's broadcaster for the Eurovision Song Contest, Sveriges Television (SVT), organized a 30-entry competition, Melodifestivalen 2024, to select the country's entrant for the Eurovision Song Contest 2024. The competition was split into five heats of six songs, where the top two in each heat qualified to the 12-song grand final. Third and fourth in each heat qualified to a second-chance round, where the top two in the round qualified to complete the lineup for the final. In the final, the winner was selected via a 50/50 system of juries and televoting.

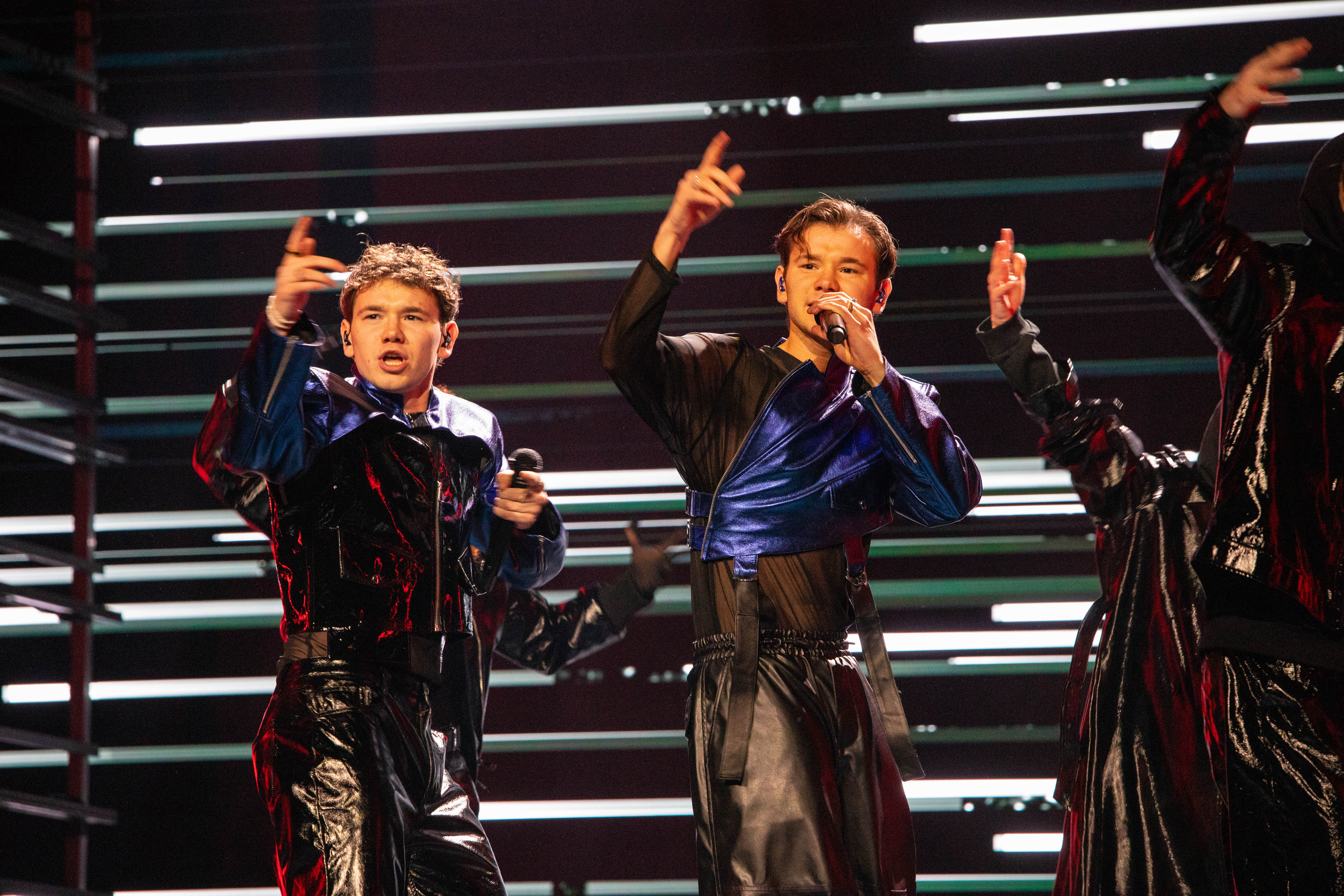
Marcus & Martinus performing "Unforgettable" in the fifth heat of Melodifestivalen 2024.

The duo were first rumored to compete in the competition on 31 October 2023 by Aftonbladet. Confirmation of the report was given on 1 December, where they were placed into the fifth heat and were later drawn to perform first in the heat. In the heat on 2 March, they managed to finish first, directly qualifying to the grand final where they were drawn to perform seventh. In the final on 9 March, the song was able to come in first place in both the juries and televoting, winning the competition. As a result of winning the competition, it won rights to represent Sweden in the Eurovision Song Contest 2024.

=== At Eurovision ===
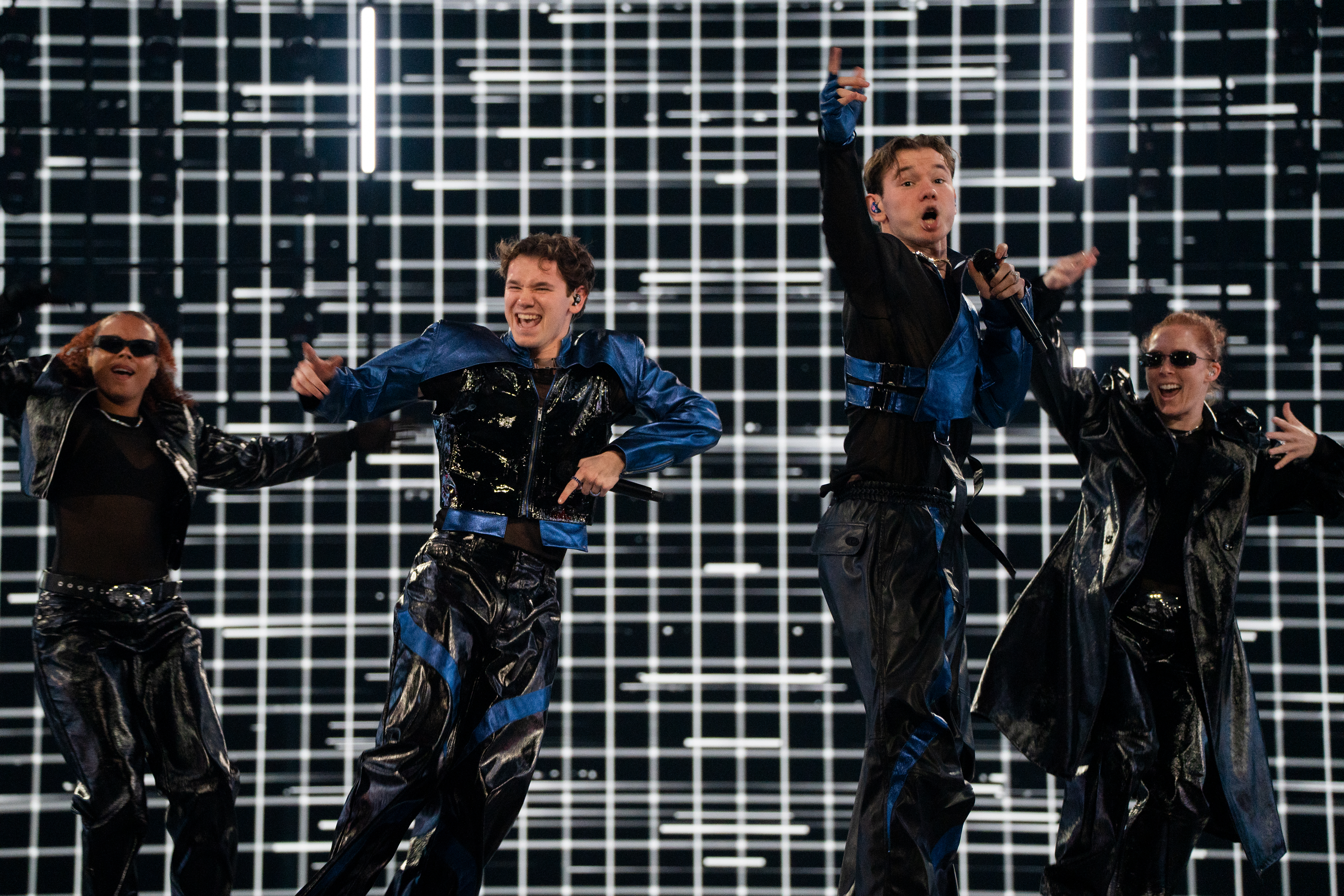
Marcus and Martinus performing "Unforgettable" in a dress rehearsal before the Eurovision 2024 grand final.

The Eurovision Song Contest 2024 is taking place at the Malmö Arena in Malmö, Sweden, and consists of two semi-finals held on 7 and 9 May, respectively, and the final on 11 May 2024. According to Eurovision rules, all countries, except the host and the "Big Five" (France, Germany, Italy, Spain, and the United Kingdom), are required to qualify from one semi-final to compete in the final; the top ten countries from each semi-final progress to the final. As Sweden is the host country for the contest, the song was given automatic entry into the grand final. The duo were later drawn to perform first in the grand final.

For its Eurovision performance, minor alterations were made to accommodate a different stage design. However, it remained closely similar to the one given in Melodifestivalen. Before the contest, the duo stated that the style of the performance had been inspired by Super Bowl halftime shows. Marcus & Martinus, wearing black-and-blue suits with blue Converse, were accompanied by four backing dancers, who wore black leather outfits. Throughout the performance, lines of code are displayed on LEDS along with a relatively dark environment.

After the results were announced, they finished in ninth with 174 points, with a split score of 125 points from juries and 49 points from public televoting. Regarding the former, the song received one set of the maximum 12 points from Germany. It did not receive any sets of 12 points from public televoting; the most given was 10, awarded by Norway. In response to their result, the duo expressed disappointment, stating that, "We wish we could have done better... we only want the best for Sweden". They further expressed sadness at the Norwegian jury, who gave them three points; a result seen as unusual due to the common occurrence of Nordic bloc voting, with the duo having expected to get a higher amount of points from the Norwegian jury.

== Track listing ==
Digital download/streaming

1. "Unforgettable" – 2:46

Digital download/streaming – Chris El Greco remix

1. "Unforgettable" (Chris El Greco remix) – 2:59
2. "Unforgettable" (Chris El Greco extended remix) – 4:04
3. "Unforgettable" – 2:46

== Charts ==
=== Weekly charts ===
Weekly chart performance for "Unforgettable"
Chart (2024)	Peak position
Estonia Airplay (TopHit)	73
Finland (Suomen virallinen lista)	19
Greece International (IFPI)	13
Iceland (Tónlistinn)	25
Ireland (IRMA)	92
Latvia (LaIPA)	17
Lithuania (AGATA)	10
Netherlands (Single Top 100)	75
Norway (VG-lista)	26
Poland (Polish Airplay Top 100)	38
Poland (Polish Streaming Top 100)	99
Sweden (Sverigetopplistan)	1
Switzerland (Schweizer Hitparade)	40
UK Singles Downloads (Official Charts)	38
UK Singles Sales (OCC)	38

=== Monthly charts ===
Monthly chart performance for "Unforgettable"
Chart (2024)	Peak position
Estonia Airplay (TopHit)	80

=== Year-end charts ===
Year-end chart performance for "Unforgettable"
Chart (2024)	Position
Sweden (Sverigetopplistan)	36

== Certifications ==
Certifications for "Unforgettable"
Region	Certification	Certified units/sales
Streaming
Sweden (GLF)	Platinum	12,000,000^{†}
^{†} Streaming-only figures based on certification alone.

== Release history ==
Release history and formats for "Unforgettable"
Country	Date	Format(s)	Version	Label	Ref.
Various	2 March 2024	Digital download; streaming	Original	Universal	
Various	12 July 2024	Digital download; streaming	Chris El Greco remix	Universal	
