= Morgan Sulele =

- Origin: Bærum, Norway
- Occupation: Singer-songwriter
- Label: UniversalSony Music

Magnus Hagen Clausen, better known as Morgan Sulele (born in Bærum, Norway) is a Norwegian singer and songwriter. He got his local breakthrough with the Song "Bare Min", which was #1 in the Norwegian Chart for 6 weeks, and has over 300 million streams as a solo artist.

As a songwriter he has been nominated for "Song Of The Year" at the Norwegian Spellemannsprisen awards, "Best Dance" with Tungevaags "All For Love" at the Swedish Grammis, which he also co-produced, and he co-wrote the song "In My Mind" for Alok and John Legend in the summer of 2021, and has also written for DJ/Producers Matoma and John De Sohn.

== Discography ==
=== Albums ===
Year	Title	Peak chart positions
Year	Title	NOR
2015	Morgans kleineste	—
2016	Morgan Sulele	2
2026	Festen er aldri over	29

=== Singles ===
Year	Title	Peak chart positions	
Year	Title	NOR	SWE
2013	"Luremus"	—	—
2015	"Rist meg" (featuring Katastrofe)	—	—
2015	"Bare min"	1	65
2015	"Jeg vil heller ha deg" (with Innertier)	4	—
2015	"Under treet"	22	—
2016	"Lakenet"	11	—
2016	"Din sang"	28	—
2016	"Min Kabin"	14	—
2016	"Helgedigg"	—	—
2016	"Mellom veggene"	—	—
2017	"Høyt over Oslo" (featuring Oral Bee)	20	—
2017	"Datt ned fra himmelen" (featuring Nico D)	—	—
2018	"Idyll" (with LOKE)	38	—
2019	"Helt Ærlig" (with OnklP)	9	—
2020	"Deg eller ingenting" (with Tix)	4	—
2021	"Danse med meg selv"	37	—
2021	"Sørenga" (with Postgirobygget and Arne Hurlen)	40	—
2022	"Da det var oss"	31	—
2022	"Oppmerksomhet" (with William Gamborg)	1	—
2023	"Danse en gang til" (with Tix)	7	—
2023	"Dagene"	26	—
2024	"Ole brumm" (with Tix)	13	—
2025	"99 problemer"	52	—
2026	"Jeg tror Peter Pan hadde rett"	10	—
