= Sweden in the Eurovision Song Contest 2020 =

- Eurovision Song Contest 2020
- Participating broadcaster: Sveriges Television (SVT)
- Country: Sweden
- Selection process: Melodifestivalen 2020
- Selection date: 7 March 2020

Competing entry
- Song: "Move"
- Artist: The Mamas
- Songwriters: Melanie Wehbe; Patrik Jean; Herman Gardarfve

Placement
- Final result: Contest cancelled

Participation chronology

Sweden was set to be represented at the Eurovision Song Contest 2020 with the song "Move", written by Melanie Wehbe, Patrik Jean, and Herman Gardarfve, and performed by The Mamas. The Swedish participating broadcaster, Sveriges Television (SVT), organised Melodifestivalen 2020 in order to select its entry for the contest. However, the contest was cancelled due to the COVID-19 pandemic.

== Background ==
Prior to the 2020 contest, Sveriges Radio (SR) until 1979, and Sveriges Television (SVT) since 1980, had participated in the Eurovision Song Contest representing Sweden fifty-nine times since SR's first entry in 1958. Sweden had won the contest on six occasions: in 1974 with the song "Waterloo" performed by ABBA, in 1984 with the song "Diggi-Loo Diggi-Ley" performed by Herreys, in 1991 with the song "Fångad av en stormvind" performed by Carola, in 1999 with the song "Take Me to Your Heaven" performed by Charlotte Nilsson, in 2012 with the song "Euphoria" performed by Loreen, and in 2015 with the song "Heroes" performed by Måns Zelmerlöw. Following the introduction of semi-finals for the 2004, Sweden's entries, to this point, have featured in every final except for 2010 when the nation failed to qualify.

As part of its duties as participating broadcaster, SVT organises the selection of its entry in the Eurovision Song Contest and broadcasts the event in the country. Since 1959, SR first and SVT later have organised the annual competition Melodifestivalen in order to select their entries for the contest.

== Before Eurovision ==
=== Melodifestivalen 2020 ===
Four heats, a Second Chance round and a final were held. It was held between 1 February and 7 March 2020.

==== Heats and Second Chance round ====
- The first heat took place on 1 February 2020 at the Saab Arena in Linköping. "Move" performed by the Mamas and "Take a Chance" performed by Robin Bengtsson qualified directly to the final, while "Ballerina" performed by Malou Prytz and "Boys with Emotions" performed by Felix Sandman advanced to the Second Chance round. "Moves" performed by Suzi P, "Inga problem" performed by OVÖ, and "Sluta aldrig gå" performed by Sonja Aldén were eliminated from the contest.
- The second heat took place on 9 February 2020 at the Scandinavium arena in Gothenburg. "Kingdom Come" performed by Anna Bergendahl and "Bulletproof" performed by Dotter qualified directly to the final, while "Vamos Amigos" performed by Méndez feat. Alvaro Estrella and "Talking in My Sleep" performed by Paul Rey advanced to the Second Chance round. "Nobody" performed by Klara Hammarström, "Miraklernas tid" performed by Jan Johansen, and "Alla mina sorger" performed by Linda Bengtzing were eliminated from the contest.
- The third heat took place on 15 February 2020 at the Coop Norrbotten Arena in Luleå. "Shout It Out" performed by Mariette and "Winners" performed by Mohombi qualified directly to the final, while "Vem e som oss" performed by Anis don Demina and "Piga och dräng" performed by Drängarna advanced to the Second Chance round. "Livet börjar nu" performed by Albin Johnsén, "Late" performed by Amanda Aasa, and "Crying Rivers" performed by Faith Kakembo were eliminated from the contest.
- The fourth heat took place on 22 February 2020 at the Malmö Arena in Malmö. "Brave" performed by Hanna Ferm and "Troubled Waters" performed by Victor Crone qualified directly to the final, while "We Are One" performed by Frida Öhrn and "Surface" performed by Ellen Benediktson and Simon Peyron advanced to the Second Chance round. "Molnljus" performed by William Stridh, "Carpool Karaoke" performed by Nanne Grönvall, and "Om du tror att jag saknar dig" performed by Jakob Karlberg were eliminated from the contest.
- The Second Chance round (Andra chansen) took place on 29 February 2020 at the Stiga Sports Arena in Eskilstuna. "Vem e som oss" performed by Anis don Demina, "Talking in My Sleep" performed by Paul Rey, "Boys with Emotions" performed by Felix Sandman, and "Vamos Amigos" performed by Méndez feat. Alvaro Estrella qualified to the final.

==== Final ====
The final took place on 7 March 2020 at the Friends Arena in Stockholm.

| R/O | Artist | Song | Juries | Televote | Total | Place |
|---|---|---|---|---|---|---|
| 1 | Victor Crone | "Troubled Waters" | 19 | 38 | 57 | 9 |
| 2 | Paul Rey | "Talking in My Sleep" | 35 | 33 | 68 | 6 |
| 3 | The Mamas | "Move" | 65 | 72 | 137 | 1 |
| 4 | Mohombi | "Winners" | 20 | 6 | 26 | 12 |
| 5 | Hanna Ferm | "Brave" | 25 | 69 | 94 | 4 |
| 6 | Méndez feat. Alvaro Estrella | "Vamos Amigos" | 19 | 21 | 40 | 11 |
| 7 | Dotter | "Bulletproof" | 65 | 71 | 136 | 2 |
| 8 | Robin Bengtsson | "Take a Chance" | 35 | 28 | 63 | 8 |
| 9 | Mariette | "Shout It Out" | 42 | 9 | 51 | 10 |
| 10 | Felix Sandman | "Boys with Emotions" | 53 | 14 | 67 | 7 |
| 11 | Anna Bergendahl | "Kingdom Come" | 46 | 61 | 107 | 3 |
| 12 | Anis Don Demina | "Vem e som oss" | 40 | 42 | 82 | 5 |
