= Jimmy Jansson =

Swedish singer and songwriter (born 1985)

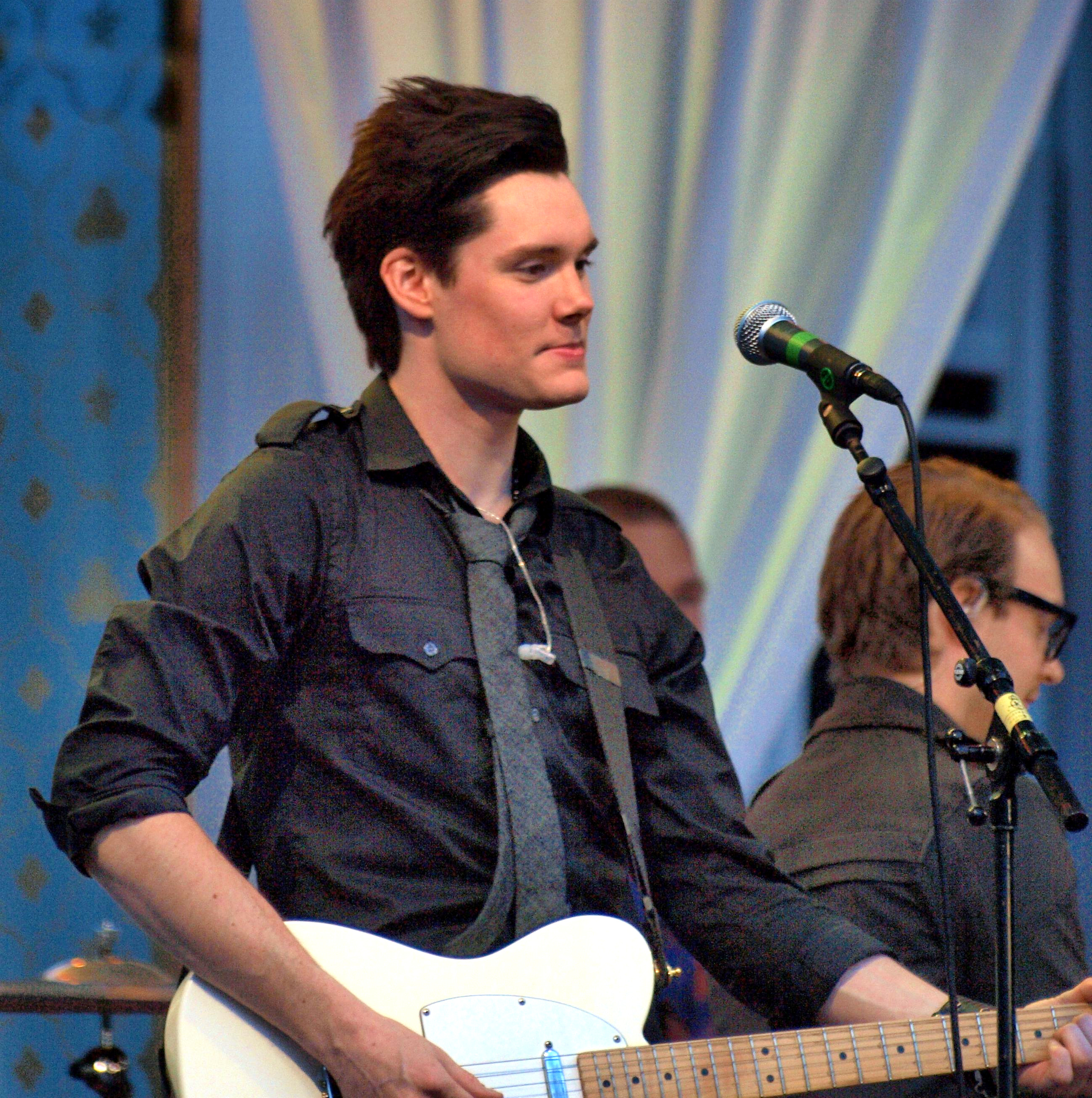

Background information
- Born: Erik Robert Jimmy Jansson; September 17, 1985 (age 41)
- Origin: Hagfors, Sweden
- Genres: Pop, pop rock
- Occupation: Singer songwriter
- Years active: 2001–present

Erik Robert Jimmy Jansson (born September 17, 1985) is a Swedish singer and songwriter. At Melodifestivalen 2020 he set a new record for the amount of competing entries by a composer at one contest with six entries.

== Music career ==
Jansson's music career began when he formed a rock band, The Poets, with some of his friends in 2001. That same year, they were chosen to compete in Melodifestivalen with the song "What Difference Does It Make," but did not make it to the finals.

In 2003 Jansson was a reality show contestant, Fame Factory, on TV3 in Sweden, who released in 2004 his first single, "Godmorgon världen," that reached No. 1 on the Swedish charts although he did not win the show. His follow-up single "Som sommaren" peaked at No. 4. and Jansson's third single, "Flickan från det blå" (both from his debut album Flickan från det blå) reached No. 40.

In 2005, he returned to Melodifestivalen, as a solo artist. He reached the finals with the song "Vi kan gunga," ultimately placing sixth. When the song was released as a single that same year, it received Jansson's highest chart placement, No. 1. In the wake of the single's success, Jansson released his second album, Som en blixt, and, several months later, a second single from the album, "En underbar refräng".

On February 10, 2007 Jansson competed in Melodifestivalen for a third time, singing the song "Amanda". He shared a 3rd place in the semi-final and got a place in the second chance round.

On March 3, 2007 Jansson lost the first voting round to Sanna Nielsen in the Second round of eliminations; he was eliminated from going to the Eurovision Song Contest.

When "Amanda" was released as a single, it peaked at number three on the Swedish Singles Chart. The album that followed it, Sån e jag, reached No. 9 on the charts and its second single, "Överallt," peaked at No. 2, spending two weeks in the charts as opposed to "Amanda"'s twelve weeks.

== Personal life ==
Jansson was engaged with Sandra Dahlberg, who was also a contestant in Fame Factory 2002 and has also competed in Melodifestivalen. Dahlberg gave birth to their child, a boy named Vilmer, on February 12, 2007. Jansson and Dahlberg separated in 2010.

== Discography ==
(with Swedish chart positions)

=== Albums ===
- Flickan från det blå (2004) – No. 2
- Som en blixt (2005) – No. 3
- Sån e jag (2007) – No. 9

=== Singles ===
- "Godmorgon världen" (2004) – No. 2
- "Som sommaren" (2004) – No. 4
- "Flickan från det blå" (2004) – No. 40
- "Vi kan gunga" (2005) – No. 1
- "En underbar refräng" (2005) – No. 4
- "Amanda" (2007) – No. 3
- "Överallt" (2007) – No. 3

== Songwriting discography ==
Title	Year	Artist	Album	Co-written with
"Jag lever för en dag"	2011	Blender	Ingen utan mig	
"Jag väntar här"	2011	Elisa's	Det här är bara början	Karl-Ola Kjellholm
"I min ensamhet"	2012	Elisa's	Det sa klick!	
"Save Me (This Is an SOS)"	2013	Helena Paparizou	Ti Ora Tha Vgoume?	Bobby Ljunggren, Micah Wilshire
"Soma Kai Psihi (Set your heart on me)"	2013	Helena Paparizou	Ti Ora Tha Vgoume?	Bobby Ljunggren
"4 Another 1"	2014	Helena Paparizou	One Life	Isabelle Moulin
"Don't Hold Back On Love"	2014	Helena Paparizou	One Life	Micah Wilshire
"Unbelievable"	2014	Lisa Ajax	Unbelievable	Micha Wilshire, Lori Wilshire
"Stevie Wonder"	2016	Robin Bengtsson	—N/a	Robin Bengtsson, Gabriel Alares
"This Summer"	2017	Sigrid Bernson	—N/a	Sigrid Bernson, Palle Hammarlund, Josefin Glenmark
"Dark Angel"	2017	Robin Bengtsson	—N/a	Andreas Öberg, Andreas Carlsson
"Love Me Wicked"	2017	Lisa Ajax	Collection	Nea Nelson, Palle Hammarlund
"What Happened to Us"	2018	Chris Kläfford	—N/a	Chris Kläfford, Brooke Toia, Anton Hård af Segerstad, Martin Eriksson
"Never Mine"	2018	Hanna Ferm	—N/a	Isak Bornebusch, Iselin Solheim
"Generad"	2018	Jakob Karlberg	—N/a	Jakob Karlberg, Palle Hammarlund, Henrik Jonzon
"Hush Little Baby (VIP)" (featuring MOLLY)	2018	Dolly Style	—N/a	Palle Hammarlund
"Pillow"	2019	Rich Edwards	—N/a	Rich Edwards
"Sunrise"	2019	Dolly Style	—N/a	Palle Hammarlund
"Vamos"	2019	Jorge Blanco	—N/a	Jorge Blanco, Jakke Erixson, Leopoldo Méndez, Palle Hammarlund
"27 Sorries"	2019	Peg Parnevik	—N/a	Peg Parnevik, Isa Tengblad, Josefin Glenmark, Palle Hammarlund
"Skit för varandra"	2019	Eric Saade	Det svarta fåret	Eric Saade, Fredrik Sonefors
"Hard to Forget"	2019	Isle of You	Party Until We're In Love	Ida Johansson, Elina Danielsson, Joakim Buddee
"Det kanske inte är så farligt?"	2020	William Segerdahl	—N/a	William Segerdahl, Martin Tjärnberg, Fredrik Sonefors
"Thelma and Louise"	2020	Anna Bergendahl	—N/a	Anna Bergendahl, Fredrik Sonefors
"Find Your Way Home" (featuring Klara)	2020	Joakim Lundell	—N/a	Joakim Lundell, Klara Almström, Birk Frisk
"Feel the Love"	2022	Riker Lynch	American Song Contest	Andreas Carlsson, Desmond Child, Vera Hotsauce
"Break a Broken Heart"	2023	Andrew Lambrou	Eurovision Song Contest 2023	Jimmy "Joker" Thornfeldt, Marcus Winther-John, Thomas Stengaard

=== Eurovision Song Contest national final entries ===
==== Melodifestivalen entries (Sweden) ====
Year	Artist	Title	Co-written with	Result
2005	Jimmy Jansson	"Vi kan gunga"	Niklas Edberger, Johan Fransson, Tim Larsson, Tobias Lundgren	6th
2007	Jimmy Jansson	"Amanda"	Thomas G:son	Second Chance
2014	Elisa Lindström	"Casanova"	Ingela "Pling" Forsman, Bobby Ljunggren	5th (Heat)
2014	Janet Leon	"Hollow"	Karl-Ola Kjellholm, Louise Winter	8th (Heat)
2015	Dolly Style	"Hello Hi"	Emma Nors, Palle Hammarlund	Second Chance
2015	Rickard Söderberg & Elize Ryd	"One By One"	Elize Ryd, Karl-Ola Kjellholm, Sharon Vaughn	5th (Heat)
2016	Panetoz	"Håll om mig hårt"	Karl-Ola Kjellholm, Jakke Erixson, Pa Modou Badjie, Njol Badjie, Nebeyu Baheru	8th
2017	Dinah Nah	"One More Night"	Thomas G:son, Dinah Nah, Dr. Alban	5th (Heat)
2017	Les Gordons	"Bound to Fall"	Jonatan Renström, Albert Björliden, Andreas Persson, Carl Ragnemyr, David Runebjörk	6th (Heat)
2018	Méndez	"Everyday"	Leopoldo Méndez, Palle Hammarlund	12th
2018	Moncho	"Cuba Libre"	David Strääf, Markus Videsäter, Axel Schylström, Moncho	Second Chance
2019	Andreas Johnson	"Army of Us"	Andreas Johnson, Sara Ryan, Andreas "Stone" Johansson, Sebastian Thott	Second Chance
2019	Dolly Style	"Habibi"	Palle Hammarlund, Robert Norberg	5th (Heat)
2019	Hanna Ferm & LIAMOO	"Hold You"	Anton Hård af Segerstad, Fredrik Sonefors, Hanna Ferm, Liam Cacatian Thomassen	3rd
2019	Margaret	"Tempo"	Anderz Wrethov, Laurell Barker, Sebastian von Koenigsegg	5th (Heat)
2019	Zeana feat. Anis don Demina	"Mina bränder"	Thomas G:son, Anis Don Demina, Pa Moudou Badjie, Robin Svensk	5th (Heat)
2020	Drängarna	"Piga och dräng"	Anders Wigelius, Robert Norberg	Second Chance
2020	Hanna Ferm	"Brave"	David Kjellstrand, Laurell Barker	4th
2020	Malou Prytz	"Ballerina"	Thomas G:son, Peter Boström	Second Chance
2020	Méndez feat. Alvaro Estrella	"Vamos amigos"	Palle Hammarlund, Jakke Erixson, Leo Mendéz	11th
2020	Mohombi	"Winners"	Mohombi Moupondo, Palle Hammarlund	12th
2020	Robin Bengtsson	"Take a Chance"	Karl-Frederik Reichhardt, Marcus Winther-John	8th
2021	Emil Assergård	"Om allting skiter sig"	Emil Assergård, Jimmy "Joker" Thörnfeldt, Anderz Wrethov, Johanna Wrethov	5th (Heat)
2021	Julia Alfrida	"Rich"	Julia Alfrida, Melanie Wehbe	7th (Heat)
2021	The Mamas	"In the Middle"	Emily Falvey, Robin Stjernberg	3rd
2022	Anders Bagge	"Bigger Than the Universe"	Anders Bagge, Peter Boström, Thomas G:son	2nd
2022	Lillasyster	"Till Our Days are Over"	Palle Hammarlund, Ian-Paolo Lira, Martin Westerstrand	4th (Semi-final)
2023	Loreen	"Tattoo"	Jimmy "Joker" Thörnfeldt, Lorine Talhaoui, Moa Carlebecker, Peter Boström, Thomas G:son	1st
2023	Mariette	"One Day"	Thomas G:son, Mariette Hansson	8th
2023	Nordman	"Släpp alla sorger"	Thomas G:son	11th
2023	Panetoz	"On My Way"	Anders Wigelius, Daniel Nzinga, Nebeyu Baheru, Njol Badjie, Pa Modou Badjie, Robert Norberg	9th
2023	Signe & Hjördis	"Edelweiss"	Anderz Wrethov, Myra Granberg	5th (Heat)
2024	Cazzi Opeia	"Give My Heart a Break"	Ellen Berg, Moa Carlebecker, Thomas G:son	4th
2024	Jacqline	"Effortless"	Dino Medanhodzic, Jacqline Mossberg Mounkassa, Moa Carlebecker, Thomas G:son	9th
2024	Lia Larsson	"30 km/h"	Axel Schylström, Lia Larsson, My Söderholm, Thomas G:son	4th (Heat)
2025	John Lundvik	"Voice of the Silent"	John Lundvik, Peter Boström, Thomas G:son	6th
2025	Klara Hammarström	"On and On and On"	Dino Medanhodzic, Klara Hammarström, Moa Carlebecker, Peter Boström, Thomas G:son	4th
2025	Victoria Silvstedt	"Love It!"	Thomas G:son	5th (Heat)
2026	A-Teens	"Iconic"	Dino Medanhodzic, Lina Hansson, Moa Carlebecker, Thomas G:son	7th
2026	Jacqline	"Woman"	Dino Medanhodzic, Moa Carlebecker, Thomas G:son	Final qualification
2026	Klara Almström	"Där hela världen väntar"	Fredrik Sonefors, Klara Almström	4th (Heat)
2026	Saga Ludvigsson	"Ain't Today"	Dino Medanhodzic, Johanna Jansson, Saga Ludvigsson	12th
2026	Sanna Nielsen	"Waste Your Love"	Peter Boström, Thomas G:son	10th

==== Beovizija entries (Serbia) ====
Year	Artist	Title	Co-written with	Result
2020	Andrija Jo	"Oči Meduze"	Andrijano Ajzi, Palle Hammarlund	4th

==== Dansk Melodi Grand Prix entries (Denmark) ====
Year	Artist	Title	Co-written with	Result
2016	Bracelet	"Breakaway"	Rebecca Krogmann, Charlie Grönvall, Felix Grönvall, Nanne Grönvall	Out (Final)
2020	Ben and Tan	"Yes"	Emil Lei, Linnea Deb	1st

==== EMA entries (Slovenia) ====
Year	Artist	Title	Co-written with	Result
2018	Nika Zorjan	"Uspavanka"	Maraaya, Nika Zorjan, Samuel Waermö, Art Hunter	Out (Semi-final)
2019	Kim	"Rhythm Back to You"	Maraaya, Samuel Waermö, Art Hunter	8th

==== Melodi Grand Prix entries (Norway) ====
Year	Artist	Title	Co-written with	Result
2020	Lisa Børud	"Talking About Us"	Anderz Wrethov, Maia Wright, Laurell Barker	Out (Gold duel)

==== Benidorm Fest entries (Spain) ====
Year	Artist	Title	Co-written with	Result
2022	Xeinn	"Eco"	Carlos Marco, Marcus Winther-John, Thomas G:son	7th

==== Luxembourg Song Contest entries (Luxembourg) ====
Year	Artist	Title	Co-written with	Result
2024	Chaild	"Hold On"	Thomas G:son, Peter Boström	8th
