= Melodifestivalen 2020 =

Swedish music competition

Dates and venue
- Heat 1: 1 February 2020
- Heat 2: 8 February 2020
- Heat 3: 15 February 2020
- Heat 4: 22 February 2020
- Second chance: 29 February 2020
- Final: 7 March 2020

Production
- Broadcaster: Sveriges Television (SVT)
- Director: Robin Hofwander; Fredrik Bäcklund
- Presenters: Lina Hedlund; Linnea Henriksson; David Sundin

Participants
- Number of entries: 28
- Number of finalists: 12

Vote
- Winning song: "Move" by The Mamas

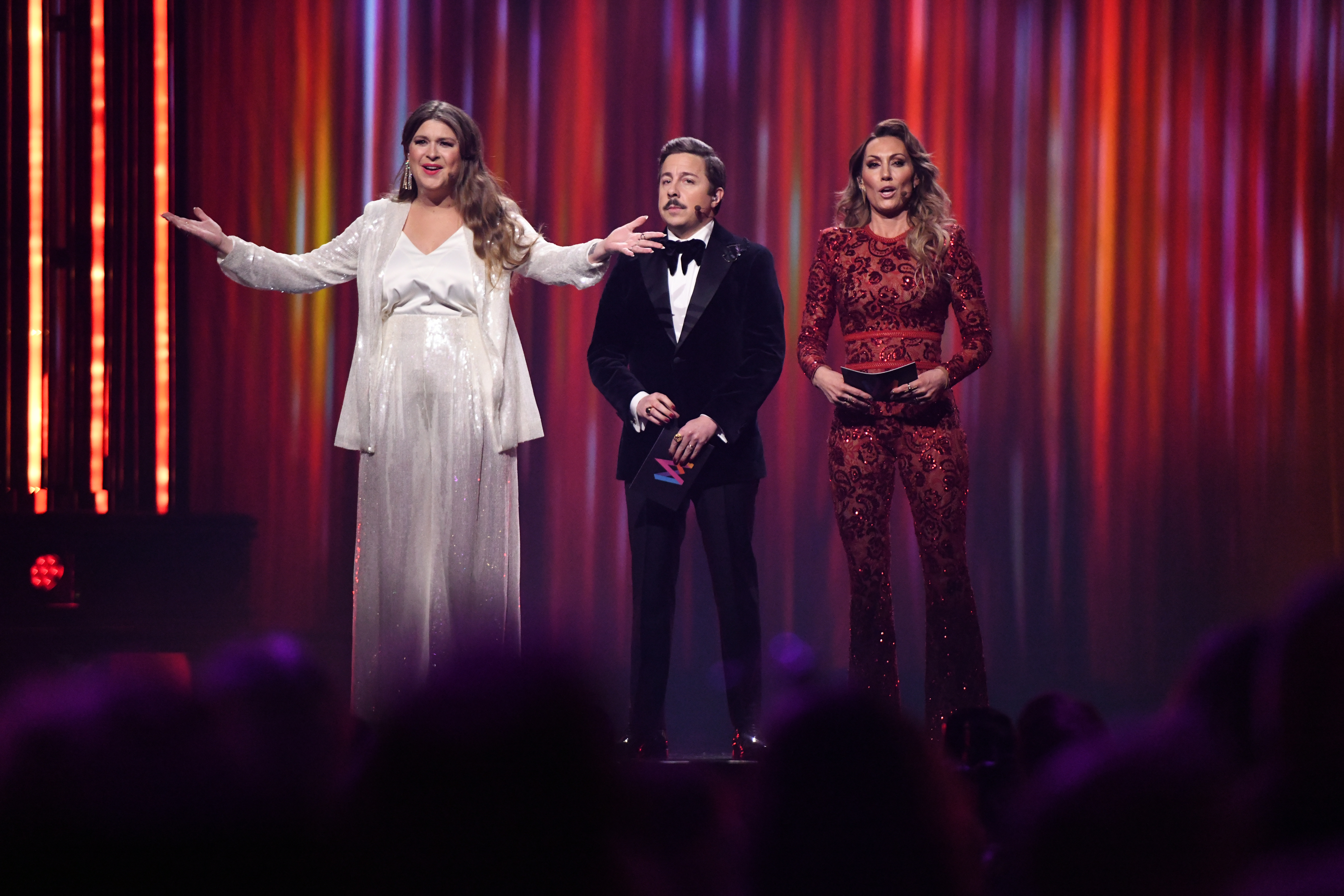
Linnea Henriksson, David Sundin and Lina Hedlund, presenters of the 60th Melodifestivalen

Melodifestivalen 2020 was the 60th edition of the Swedish music competition Melodifestivalen. The competition was organised by Sveriges Television (SVT) and took place over a six-week period between 1 February and 7 March 2020. The winner of the competition was The Mamas with the song "Move", who would have represented Sweden in the Eurovision Song Contest 2020 in Rotterdam, Netherlands. The Mamas were the first band to win the annual national competition since 2007 and the first female act to win since 2014; this was the fourth time in the history of Melodifestivalen that Sweden was unable to send a song to the Eurovision Song Contest (and the first such occurrence since 1976), as the contest itself was cancelled on 18 March 2020 due to the COVID-19 pandemic.

The format of the competition consisted of 6 shows: 4 heat rounds, a second chance round and a final. An initial 28 entries were selected for the competition through three methods: an open call for song submissions, direct invitations to specific artists and songwriters, and a wildcard given to one of the artists that participated in the P4 Nästa competition organised by Sveriges Radio P4. The 28 competing entries were divided into four heats, with seven compositions in each. From each heat, the songs that earn first and second place qualify directly to the final, while the songs that place third and fourth proceed to the Second Chance round. The bottom three songs in each heat were eliminated from the competition. An additional four entries qualified from the Second Chance round to the final, bringing the total number of competing entries in the final to 12. All 6 shows were hosted by Lina Hedlund, Linnea Henriksson and David Sundin.

== Format ==
Melodifestivalen 2020, organised by Sveriges Television (SVT), was the nineteenth consecutive edition of the contest in which the competition took place in different cities across Sweden; this was the last time that the event was held in this format. The four heats were held in the Saab Arena in Linköping (1 February), the Scandinavium in Gothenburg (8 February), the Coop Norrbotten Arena in Luleå (15 February) and the Malmö Arena in Malmö (22 February). The Second Chance round took place in the Stiga Sports Arena in Eskilstuna on 29 February, while the final was held in the Friends Arena in Stockholm on 7 March. A total of 28 entries competed in the heats, with seven entries taking part in each show. The top two entries from each heat advanced directly to the final, while the third and fourth placed entries advanced to the Second Chance round. The bottom three entries in each heat were eliminated. An additional four entries qualified for the final from the Second Chance round, bringing the total number of competing entries in the final to 12.

Competition Schedule
Show	Date	City	Venue
Heat 1	1 February 2020	Linköping	Saab Arena
Heat 2	8 February 2020	Gothenburg	Scandinavium
Heat 3	15 February 2020	Luleå	Coop Norrbotten Arena
Heat 4	22 February 2020	Malmö	Malmö Arena
Second Chance	29 February 2020	Eskilstuna	Stiga Sports Arena
Final	7 March 2020	Stockholm	Friends Arena

=== Presenters ===
On 3 September 2019, Lina Hedlund, Linnea Henriksson and David Sundin were announced as the presenters of the 60th edition of Melodifestivalen.

=== COVID-19 considerations ===
SVT issued a Q&A section on its official website to address concerns regarding the spread of COVID-19. On 3 March, four days before the Melodifestivalen final, Swedish radio station Sveriges Radio (SR) reported over 200 confirmed cases within Sweden.

The questions and answers are related to safety measures and the number of participants. 27,000 audience members, including international audience members, were anticipated. This number did not include the audience for the two dress rehearsals or any personnel. SVT stated on the Q&A page that it did not plan to establish checkpoints or other containment measures.

== Competing entries ==
The twenty-eight competing entries were announced to the public during a press conference on 26 November 2019. On 2 February 2020, it was announced that Thorsten Flinck would be disqualified from the competition due to the fact that criminal charges of unlawful threat and vandalism had been filed against him. The following day, Jan Johansen was announced as his replacement.

Artist	Song	Songwriter(s)
Albin Johnsén	"Livet börjar nu"	Robin Stjernberg, Albin Johnsén, Gino Yonan
Amanda Aasa	"Late"	Amanda Aasa, Siri Jansson, Erik Grahn, Alex Shield
Anis don Demina	"Vem e som oss"	Anderz Wrethov, Loui Maleoko, Johanna Elkesdotter Wrethov, Anis Don Demina, Robin Svensk
Anna Bergendahl	"Kingdom Come"	Bobby Ljunggren, Thomas G:son, Erik Bernholm, Anna Bergendahl
Dotter	"Bulletproof"	Dino Medanhodzic, Johanna Jansson, Erik Dahlqvist
Drängarna	"Piga och dräng"	Anders Wigelius, Robert Norberg, Jimmy Jansson
Ellen Benediktson & Simon Peyron	"Surface"	Paul Rey, Laurell Barker, Anderz Wrethov, Sebastian von Koenigsegg, Ellen Benediktson
Faith Kakembo	"Crying Rivers"	Jörgen Elofsson, Liz Rodrigues
Felix Sandman	"Boys with Emotions"	Tony Ferrari, Parker James, Peter Thomas, Philip Bentley, Nicki Adamsson, Felix Sandman
Frida Öhrn	"We Are One"	Frida Öhrn, Hampus Eurenius, Nicklas Eklund
Hanna Ferm	"Brave"	David Kjellstrand, Jimmy Jansson, Laurell Barker
Jakob Karlberg	"Om du tror att jag saknar dig"	Nanne Grönvall, Isak Hallén, Henrik Moreborg, Jakob Karlberg
Klara Hammarström	"Nobody"	Erik Smaaland, Palle Hammarlund, Klara Hammarström
Linda Bengtzing	"Alla mina sorger"	Yvonne Dahlbom, Jesper Welander, Adam Jönsson, Linda Bengtzing
Malou Prytz	"Ballerina"	Thomas G:son, Peter Boström, Jimmy Jansson
Mariette	"Shout It Out"	Thomas G:son, Cassandra Ströberg, Alex Shield, Mariette Hansson
Méndez feat. Alvaro Estrella	"Vamos Amigos"	Palle Hammarlund, Jimmy Jansson, Jakke Erixson, Leo Mendéz
Mohombi	"Winners"	Jimmy Jansson, Mohombi Moupondo, Palle Hammarlund
Nanne Grönvall	"Carpool Karaoke"	Nanne Grönvall, Peter Grönvall
OVÖ	"Inga problem"	Nicholas Frandsen, Lukas Nathanson, Jean-Willy Akofely, Nickie Osenius Kouakou
Paul Rey	"Talking in My Sleep"	Paul Rey, Lukas Hällgren, Alexander Standal Pavelich
Robin Bengtsson	"Take a Chance"	Jimmy Jansson, Karl-Frederik Reichhardt, Marcus Winther-John
Sonja Aldén	"Sluta aldrig gå"	Bobby Ljunggren, David Lindgren Zacharias, Sonja Aldén
Suzi P	"Moves"	Joy Deb, Suzi Pancekov, Aniela Eklund, Malou Ruotsalainen, Chanel Tukia, Kenny Silverdique
The Mamas	"Move"	Melanie Wehbe, Patrik Jean, Herman Gardarfve
~~Thorsten Flinck~~	"Miraklernas tid"	Thomas G:son
Jan Johansen	"Miraklernas tid"	Thomas G:son
Victor Crone	"Troubled Waters"	Dino Medanhodzic, Benjamin Jennebo, Victor Crone
William Stridh	"Molnljus"	Markus Lidén, Christian Holmström, David Kreuger, William Stridh

== Heats ==
=== Heat 1 ===
The first heat took place on 1 February 2020 in the Saab Arena in Linköping. More than 454,000 SEK was collected for Radiohjälpen.

R/O	Artist	Song	Votes		Place	Result
R/O	Artist	Song	Votes	Points	Place	Result
1	The Mamas	"Move"	1,370,798	86	1	Final
2	Suzi P	"Moves"	582,520	13	7	Out
3	Robin Bengtsson	"Take a Chance"	1,267,149	84	2	Final
4	Malou Prytz	"Ballerina"	1,146,797	58	3	Second Chance
5	OVÖ	"Inga problem"	633,485	19	6	Out
6	Sonja Aldén	"Sluta aldrig gå"	661,376	32	5	Out
7	Felix Sandman	"Boys with Emotions"	1,080,040	52	4	Second Chance

Detailed televoting results
R/O	Song	Age groups							Tel.
R/O	Song	3‍–‍9	10‍–‍15	16‍–‍29	30‍–‍44	45‍–‍59	60‍–‍74	75+	Tel.
1	"Move"	6	12	12	12	12	10	10	12
2	"Take a Chance"	12	10	8	10	10	12	12	10
3	"Ballerina"	10	8	6	8	8	4	8	6
4	"Boys with Emotions"	8	6	10	6	6	6	6	4
5	"Sluta aldrig gå"	1	1	2	4	4	8	4	8
6	"Inga problem"	2	4	4	2	2	1	2	2
7	"Moves"	4	2	1	1	1	2	1	1

=== Heat 2 ===
The second heat took place on 8 February 2020 in the Scandinavium arena in Gothenburg.

R/O	Artist	Song	Votes		Place	Result
R/O	Artist	Song	Votes	Points	Place	Result
1	Klara Hammarström	"Nobody"	951,815	40	5	Out
2	Jan Johansen	"Miraklernas tid"	501,335	8	7	Out
3	Dotter	"Bulletproof"	1,160,616	74	2	Final
4	Méndez feat. Alvaro Estrella	"Vamos Amigos"	1,070,755	66	3	Second Chance
5	Linda Bengtzing	"Alla mina sorger"	717,043	18	6	Out
6	Paul Rey	"Talking in My Sleep"	1,029,652	62	4	Second Chance
7	Anna Bergendahl	"Kingdom Come"	1,140,812	76	1	Final

Detailed televoting results
R/O	Song	Age groups							Tel.
R/O	Song	3‍–‍9	10‍–‍15	16‍–‍29	30‍–‍44	45‍–‍59	60‍–‍74	75+	Tel.
1	"Kingdom Come"	6	4	6	12	12	12	12	12
2	"Bulletproof"	8	12	10	10	10	6	8	10
3	"Vamos Amigos"	12	10	8	8	8	8	6	6
4	"Talking in My Sleep"	4	6	12	6	6	10	10	8
5	"Nobody"	10	8	4	4	4	2	4	4
6	"Alla mina sorger"	2	2	2	2	2	4	2	2
7	"Miraklernas tid"	1	1	1	1	1	1	1	1

=== Heat 3 ===
The third heat took place on 15 February 2020 in the Coop Norrbotten Arena in Luleå.

R/O	Artist	Song	Votes		Place	Result
R/O	Artist	Song	Votes	Points	Place	Result
1	Mariette	"Shout It Out"	1,215,521	88	1	Final
2	Albin Johnsén	"Livet börjar nu"	470,431	9	7	Out
3	Drängarna	"Piga och dräng"	921,811	56	4	Second Chance
4	Amanda Aasa	"Late"	534,652	18	6	Out
5	Anis don Demina	"Vem e som oss"	1,107,528	60	3	Second Chance
6	Faith Kakembo	"Crying Rivers"	733,502	51	5	Out
7	Mohombi	"Winners"	1,031,906	62	2	Final

Detailed televoting results
R/O	Song	Age groups							Tel.
R/O	Song	3‍–‍9	10‍–‍15	16‍–‍29	30‍–‍44	45‍–‍59	60‍–‍74	75+	Tel.
1	"Shout It Out"	12	10	10	12	12	12	12	8
2	"Winners"	10	8	6	8	10	8	8	4
3	"Vem e som oss"	8	12	12	10	4	4	4	6
4	"Piga och dräng"	6	6	8	6	6	6	6	12
5	"Crying Rivers"	1	4	4	4	8	10	10	10
6	"Late"	4	2	2	2	2	2	2	2
7	"Livet börjar nu"	2	1	1	1	1	1	1	1

=== Heat 4 ===
The fourth heat took place on 22 February 2020 in the Malmö Arena in Malmö.

R/O	Artist	Song	Votes		Place	Result
R/O	Artist	Song	Votes	Points	Place	Result
1	Frida Öhrn	"We Are One"	685,633	51	3	Second Chance
2	William Stridh	"Molnljus"	700,582	36	5	Out
3	Nanne Grönvall	"Carpool Karaoke"	548,116	21	7	Out
4	Victor Crone	"Troubled Waters"	1,072,105	82	2	Final
5	Ellen Benediktson & Simon Peyron	"Surface"	698,364	38	4	Second Chance
6	Jakob Karlberg	"Om du tror att jag saknar dig"	619,888	22	6	Out
7	Hanna Ferm	"Brave"	1,174,481	94	1	Final

Detailed televoting results
R/O	Song	Age groups							Tel.
R/O	Song	3‍–‍9	10‍–‍15	16‍–‍29	30‍–‍44	45‍–‍59	60‍–‍74	75+	Tel.
1	"Brave"	12	12	10	12	12	12	12	12
2	"Troubled Waters"	10	10	12	10	10	10	10	10
3	"We Are One"	6	4	1	8	8	8	8	8
4	"Surface"	4	6	4	6	6	4	4	4
5	"Molnljus"	8	8	6	4	1	1	2	6
6	"Om du tror att jag saknar dig"	2	2	8	2	4	2	1	1
7	"Carpool Karaoke"	1	1	2	1	2	6	6	2

== Second Chance ==
The Second Chance round (Swedish: Andra chansen) took place on 29 February 2020 in the Stiga Sports Arena in Eskilstuna. This was the first time in the history of the competition that Eskilstuna hosted a Melodifestivalen round.

Duel	R/O	Artist	Song	Votes	Points	Result
I	1	Anis don Demina	"Vem e som oss"	937,009	7	Final
I	2	Ellen Benediktson & Simon Peyron	"Surface"	566,544	1	Out
II	1	Malou Prytz	"Ballerina"	833,780	3	Out
II	2	Paul Rey	"Talking in My Sleep"	810,439	5	Final
III	1	Felix Sandman	"Boys with Emotions"	793,582	4	Final
III	2	Frida Öhrn	"We Are One"	550,632	4	Out
IV	1	Méndez feat. Alvaro Estrella	"Vamos Amigos"	805,286	4	Final
IV	2	Drängarna	"Piga och dräng"	685,762	4	Out

Detailed televoting results
Duel	R/O	Song	Age groups							Tel.	Total
Duel	R/O	Song	3‍–‍9	10‍–‍15	16‍–‍29	30‍–‍44	45‍–‍59	60‍–‍74	75+	Tel.	Total
I	1	"Vem e som oss"	1	1	1	1	1	0	1	1	7
I	2	"Surface"	0	0	0	0	0	1	0	0	1
II	1	"Ballerina"	1	1	0	1	0	0	0	0	3
II	2	"Talking in My Sleep"	0	0	1	0	1	1	1	1	5
III	1	"Boys with Emotions"	1	1	1	1	0	0	0	0	4 (Note: Received more votes in total than "We Are One")
III	2	"We Are One"	0	0	0	0	1	1	1	1	4
IV	1	"Vamos Amigos"	1	1	0	1	1	0	0	0	4 (Note: Received more votes in total than "Piga och dräng")
IV	2	"Piga och dräng"	0	0	1	0	0	1	1	1	4

== Final ==
The final took place on 7 March 2020 in the Friends Arena in Stockholm.

R/O	Artist	Song	Juries	Public	Total	Place
1	Victor Crone	"Troubled Waters"	19	38	57	9
2	Paul Rey	"Talking in My Sleep"	35	33	68	6
3	The Mamas	"Move"	65	72	137	1
4	Mohombi	"Winners"	20	6	26	12
5	Hanna Ferm	"Brave"	25	69	94	4
6	Méndez feat. Alvaro Estrella	"Vamos Amigos"	19	21	40	11
7	Dotter	"Bulletproof"	65	71	136	2
8	Robin Bengtsson	"Take a Chance"	35	28	63	8
9	Mariette	"Shout It Out"	42	9	51	10
10	Felix Sandman	"Boys with Emotions"	53	14	67	7
11	Anna Bergendahl	"Kingdom Come"	46	61	107	3
12	Anis don Demina	"Vem e som oss"	40	42	82	5

Detailed international jury votes
R/O	Song	Israel	Austria	Armenia	Australia	Malta	Iceland	France	Netherlands	Total
R/O	Song	Israel	Austria	Armenia	Australia	Malta	Iceland	France	Netherlands	Total
1	"Troubled Waters"	1	4	5	1	1	2	5		19
2	"Talking in My Sleep"	6		7	4	4		10	4	35
3	"Move"	4	6	12	10	12	8	6	7	65
4	"Winners"	5	5		3		4	3		20
5	"Brave"	7		3	2	7	3	2	1	25
6	"Vamos Amigos"		1	2	7	3	1		5	19
7	"Bulletproof"	10	2	6	12	10	12	7	6	65
8	"Take a Chance"	3	8	10		6	5	1	2	35
9	"Shout It Out"		10	1		5	6	12	8	42
10	"Boys with Emotions"	8	7	8	8	2		8	12	53
11	"Kingdom Come"	12	3	4	6	8	10		3	46
12	"Vem e som oss"	2	12		5		7	4	10	40
International jury spokespersons
Israel – Tali Eshkoli; Austria – Marvin Dietmann; Armenia – Anush Ter-Ghukasyan; Australia – Paul Clarke; Malta – Clas Romander; Iceland – Selma Björnsdóttir; France – Bruno Berberes; Netherlands – Getty Kaspers

Detailed televoting results
R/O	Song	Votes	Age groups							Tel.	Total
R/O	Song	Votes	3‍–‍9	10‍–‍15	16‍–‍29	30‍–‍44	45‍–‍59	60‍–‍74	75+	Tel.	Total
1	"Troubled Waters"	1,058,691	7	5	4	4	6	5	4	3	38
2	"Talking in My Sleep"	1,086,230	4	7	7	5	2	3	3	2	33
3	"Move"	1,610,446	5	12	12	10	10	7	8	8	72
4	"Winners"	787,224	3	2		1					6
5	"Brave"	1,335,870	12	10	6	7	7	10	10	7	69
6	"Vamos Amigos"	882,046	10	4	2	3	1	1			21
7	"Bulletproof"	1,489,636	8	8	10	12	8	8	7	10	71
8	"Take a Chance"	891,620	2	3	1	2	5	6	5	4	28
9	"Shout It Out"	719,420					3	4	1	1	9
10	"Boys with Emotions"	827,809	1	1	3			2	2	5	14
11	"Kingdom Come"	1,244,146			5	8	12	12	12	12	61
12	"Vem e som oss"	1,168,875	6	6	8	6	4		6	6	42

== Gallery ==
=== Heat 1 ===
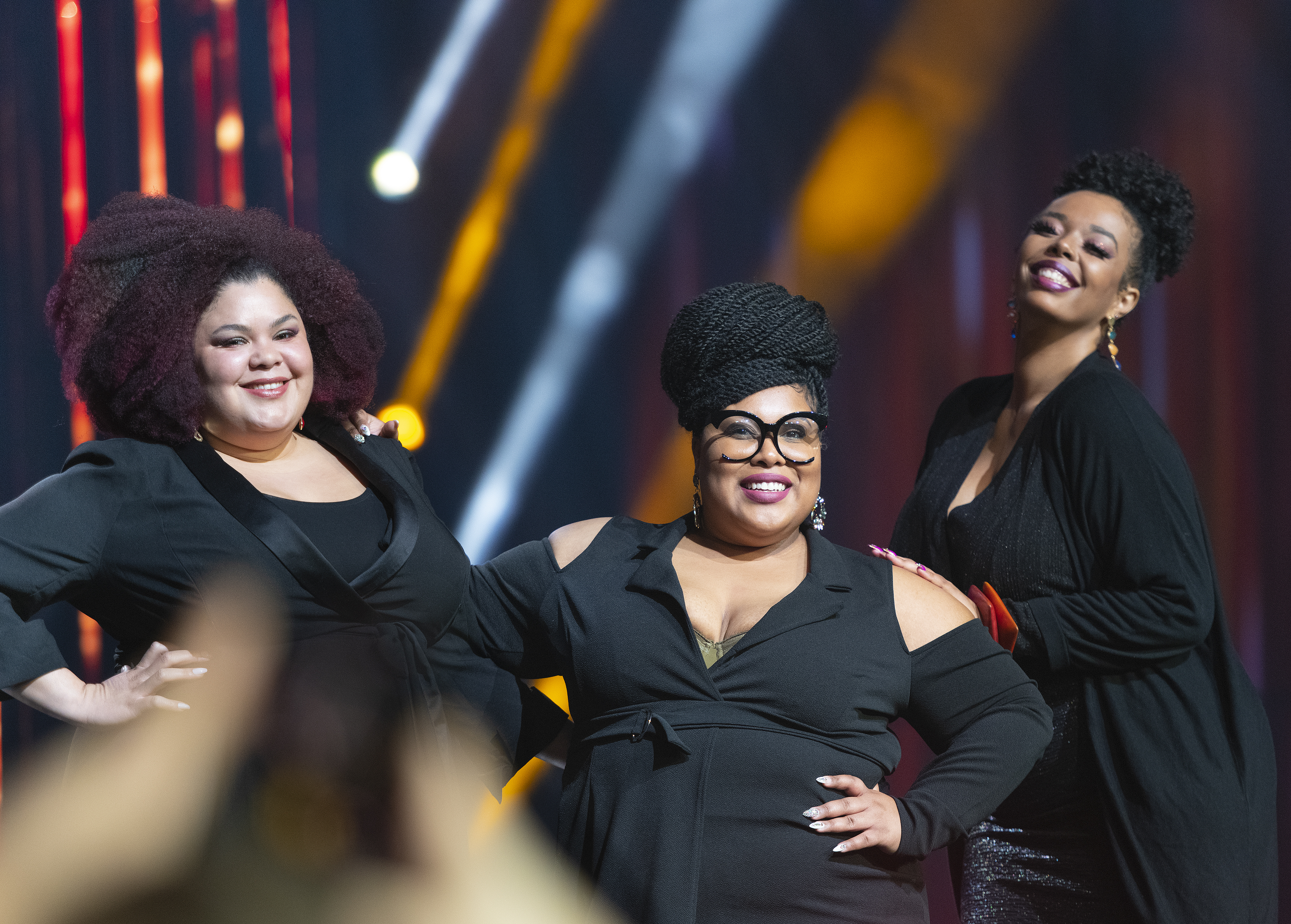
The Mamas – "Move"

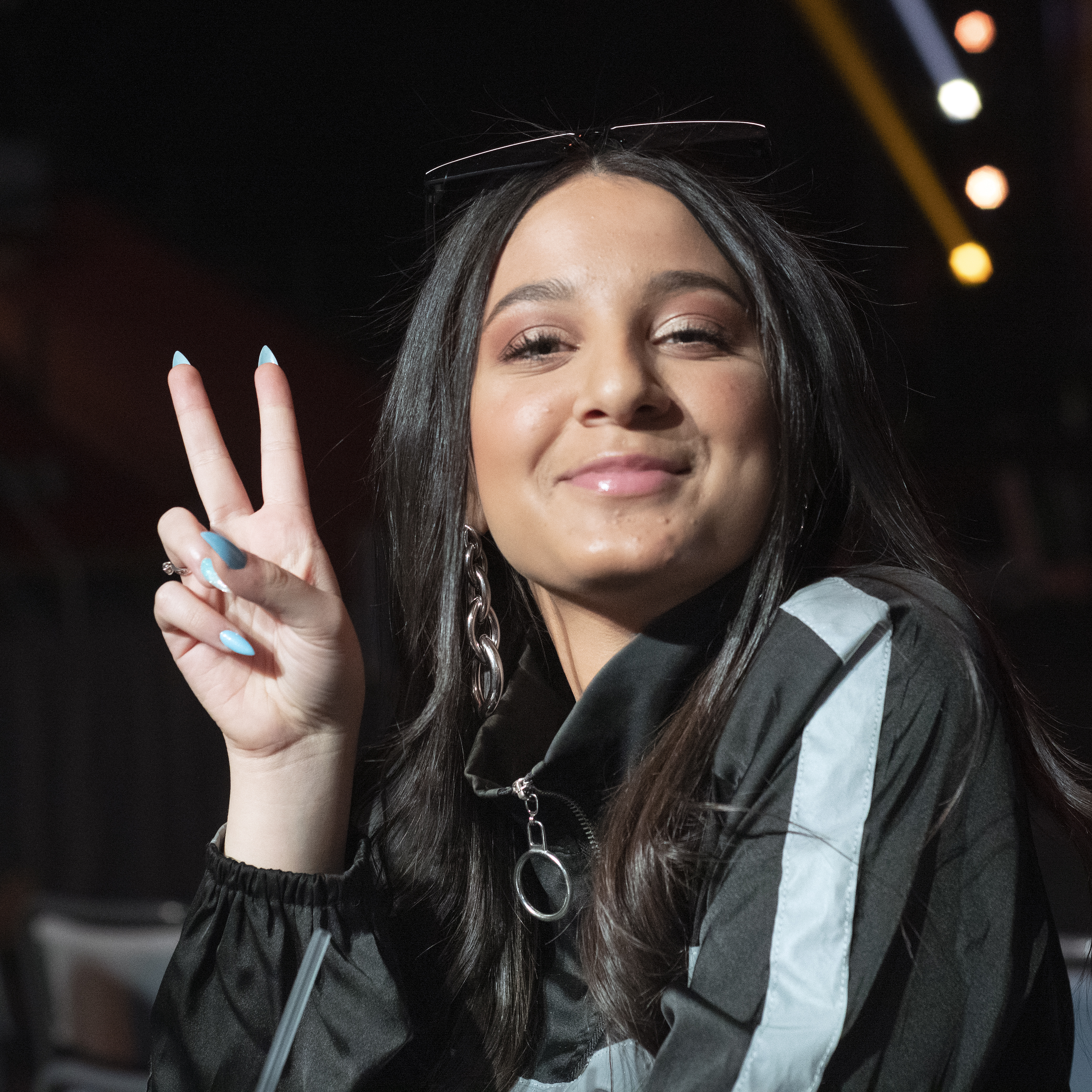
Suzi P – "Moves"

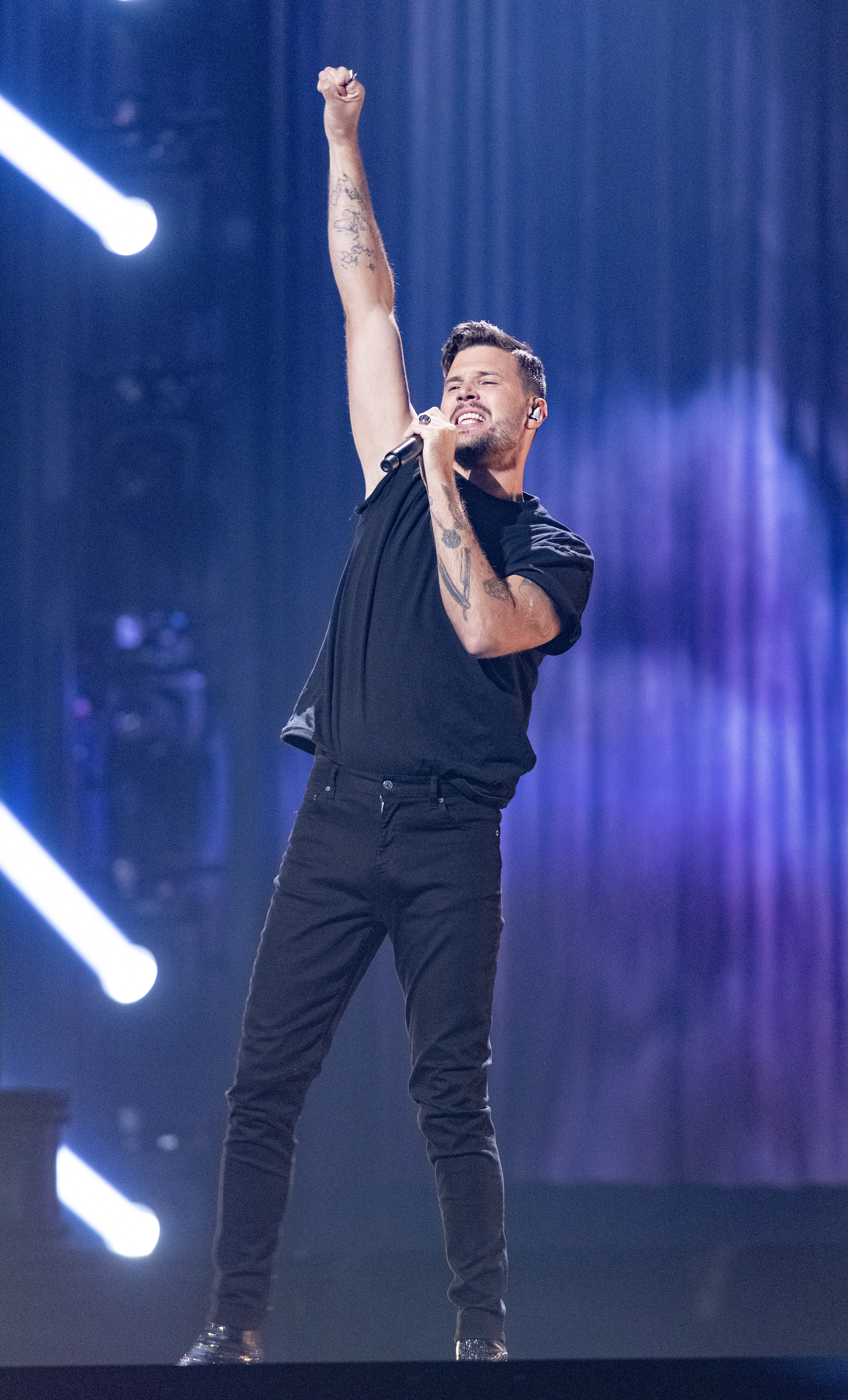
Robin Bengtsson – "Take a Chance"

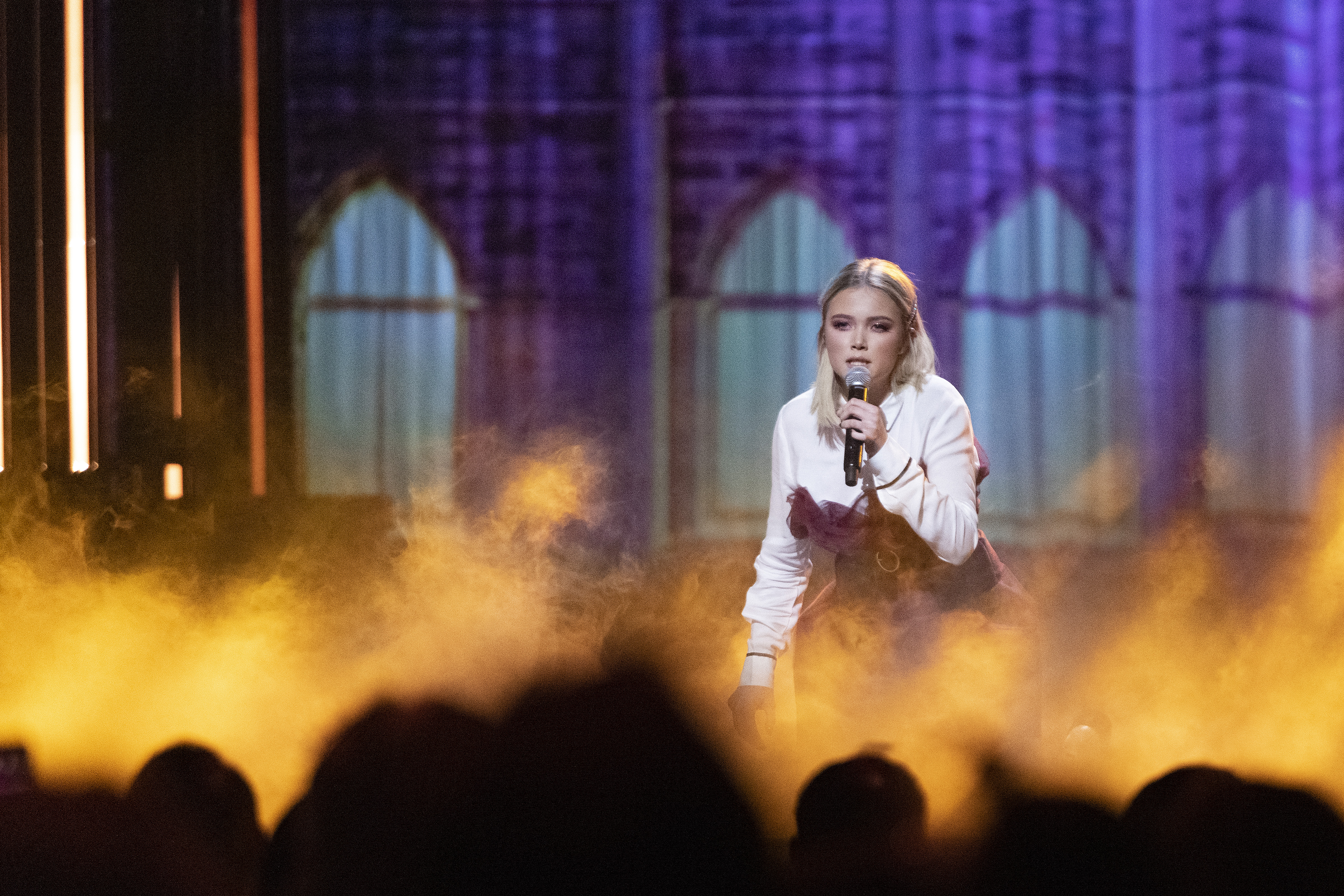
Malou Prytz – "Ballerina"

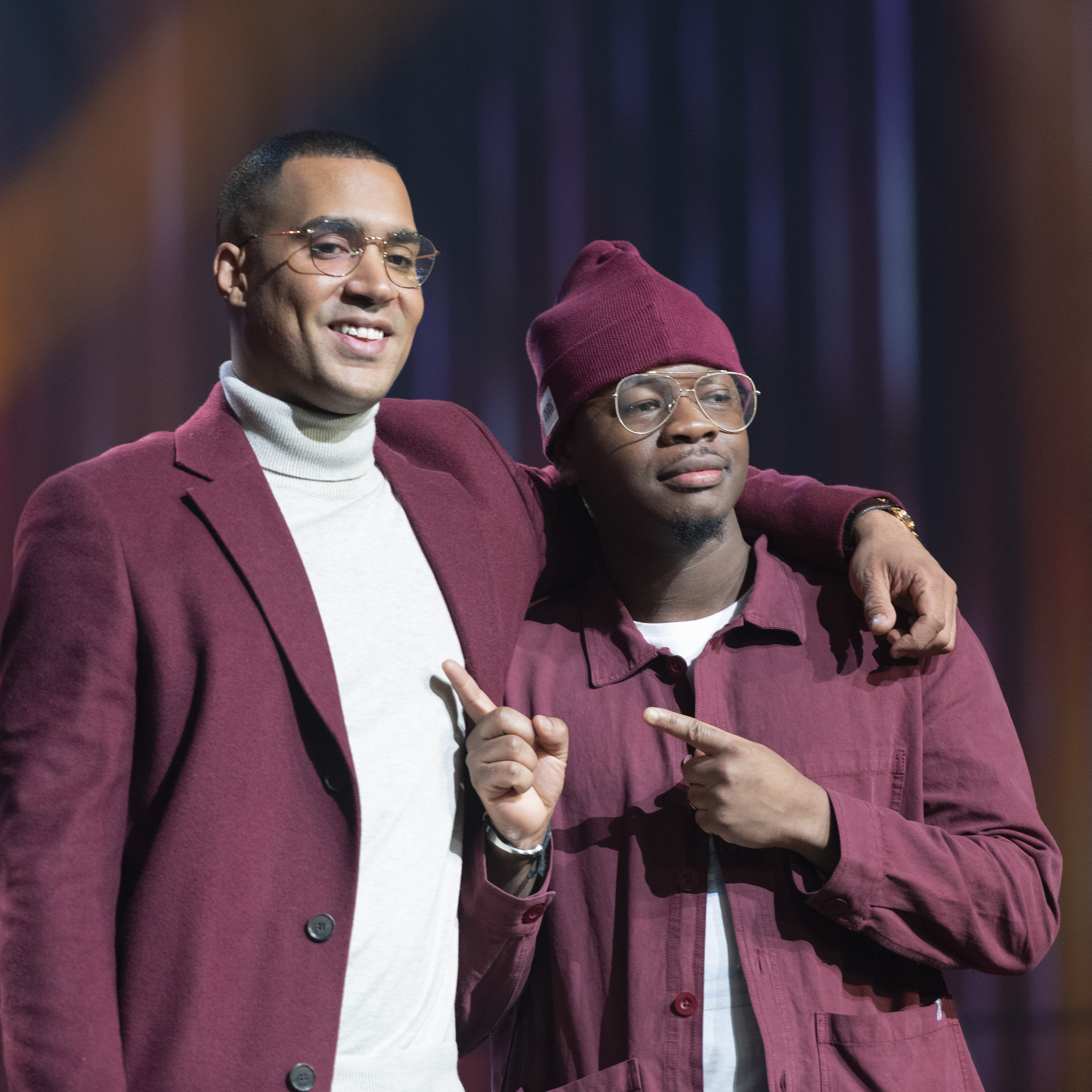
OVÖ – "Inga problem"

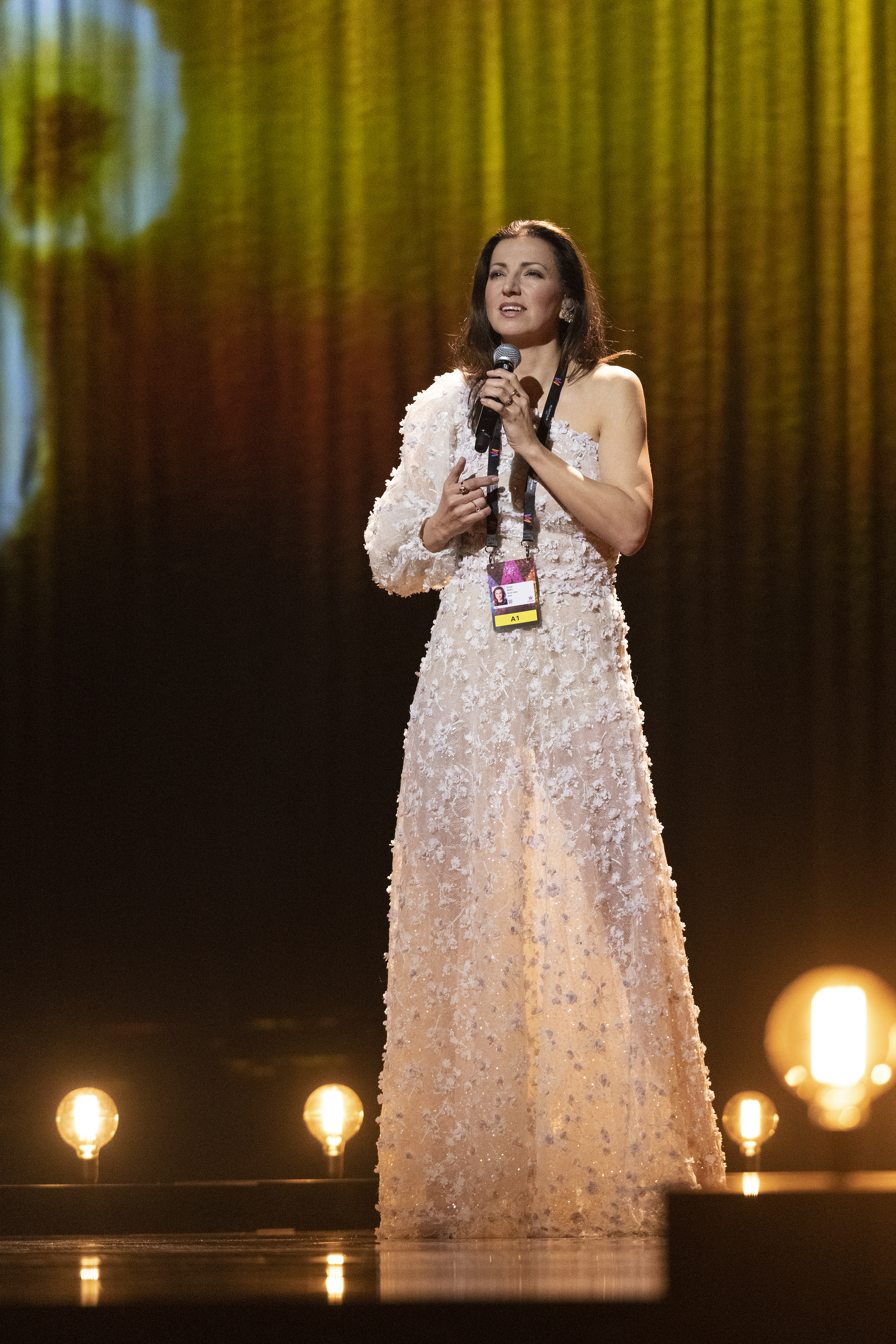
Sonja Aldén – "Sluta aldrig gå"

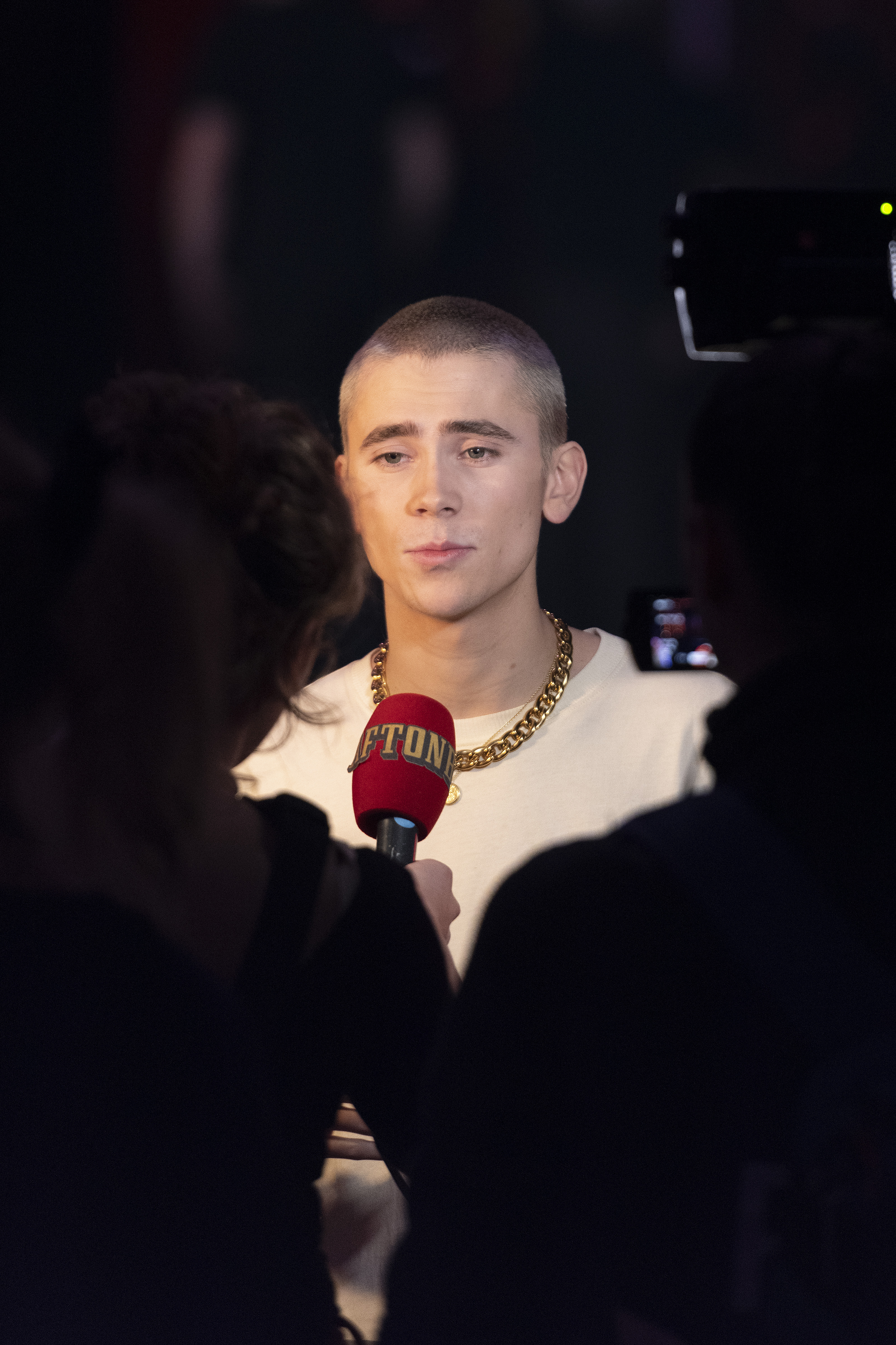
Felix Sandman – "Boys with Emotions"

=== Heat 2 ===
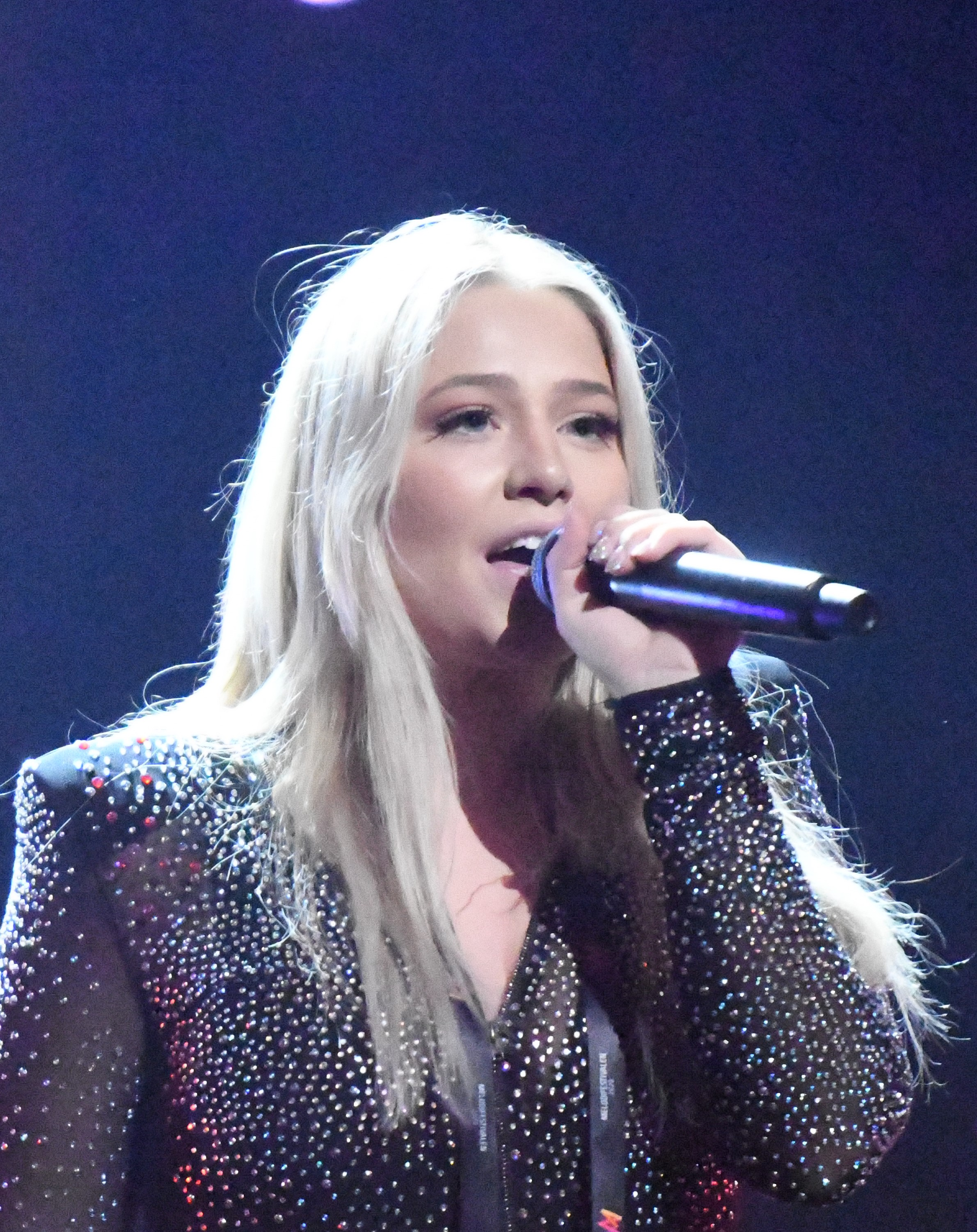
Klara Hammarström – "Nobody"

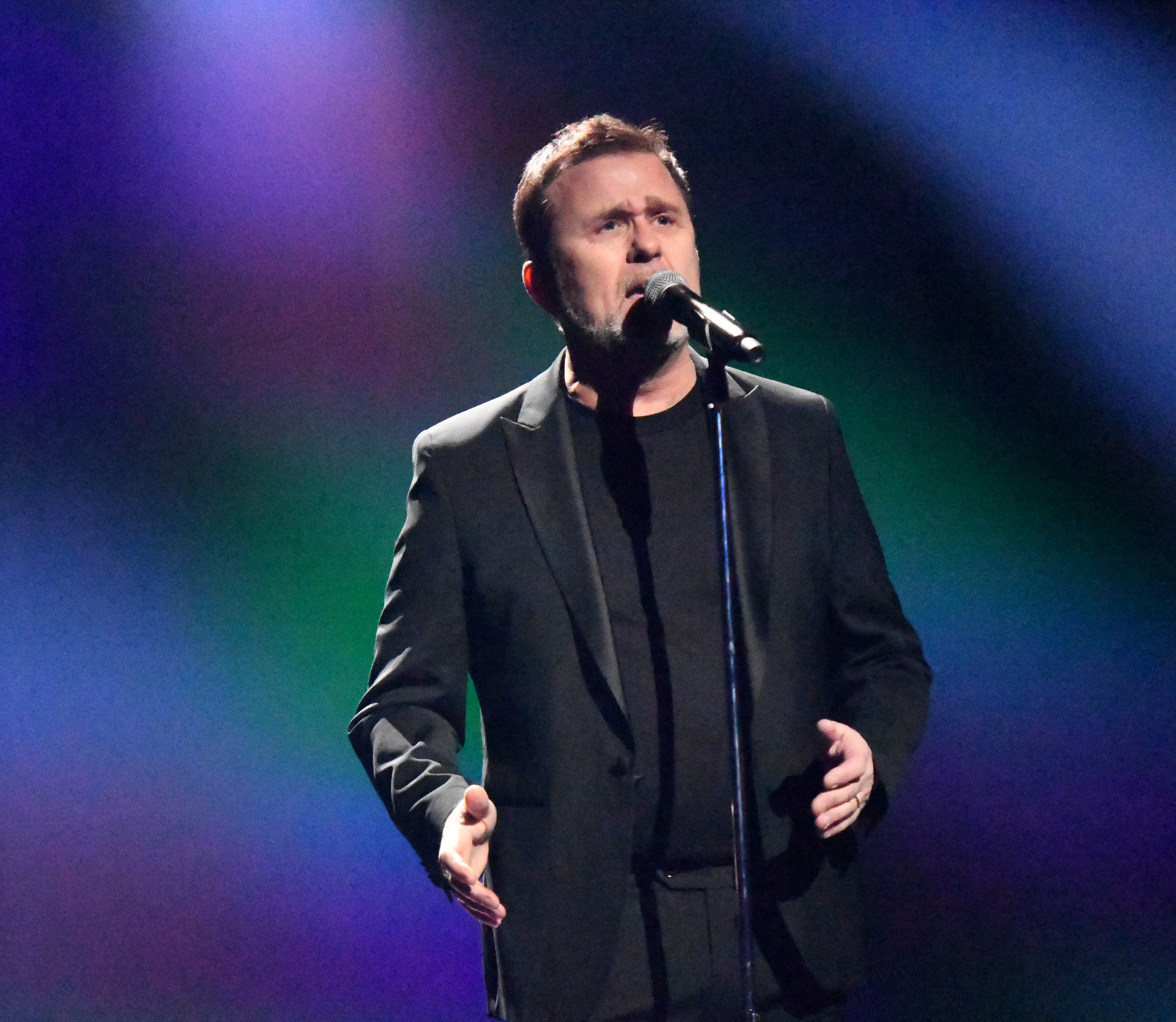
Jan Johansen – "Miraklernas tid"

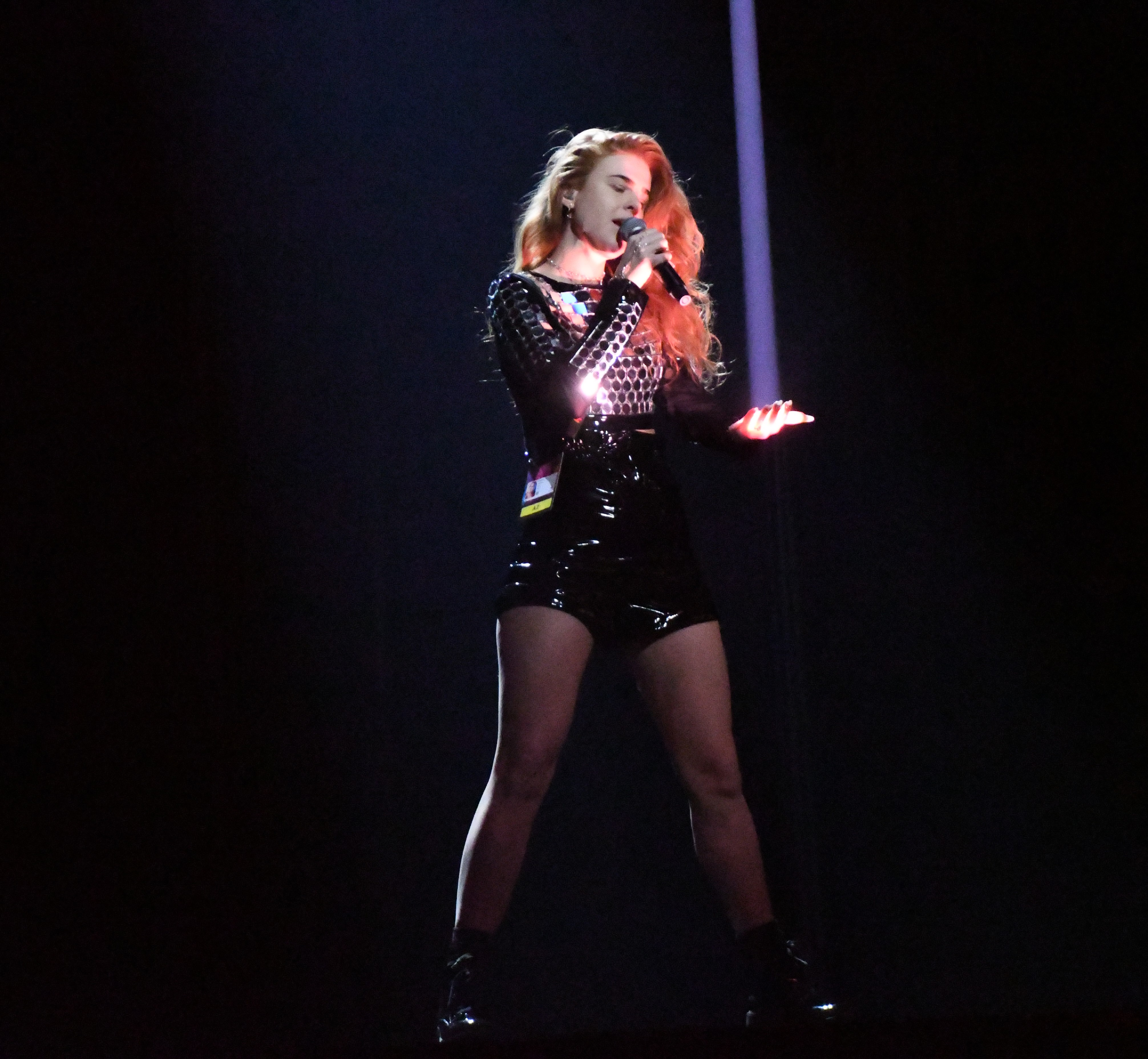
Dotter – "Bulletproof"

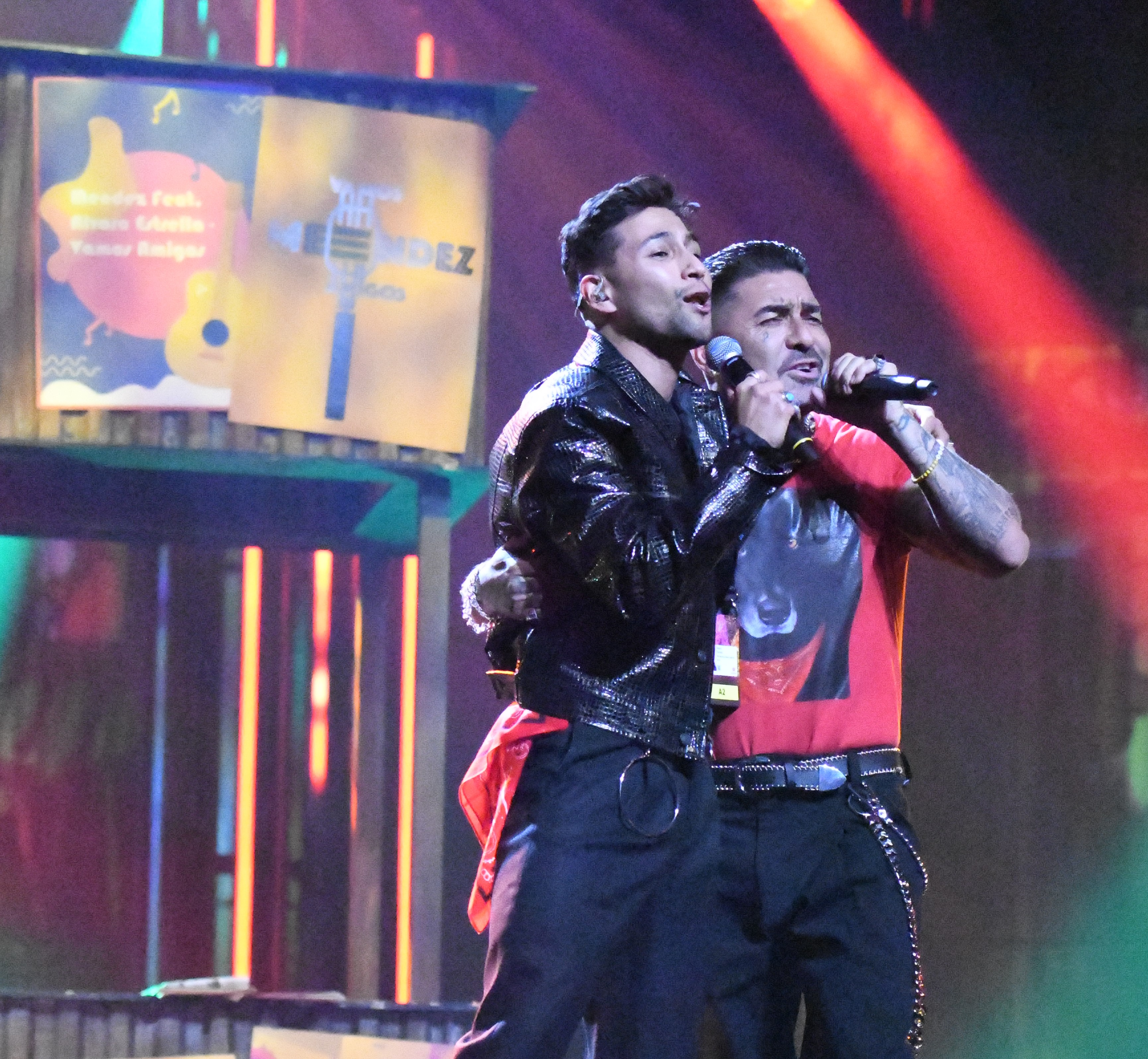
Mendez ft. Alvaro Estrella – "Vamos Amigos"

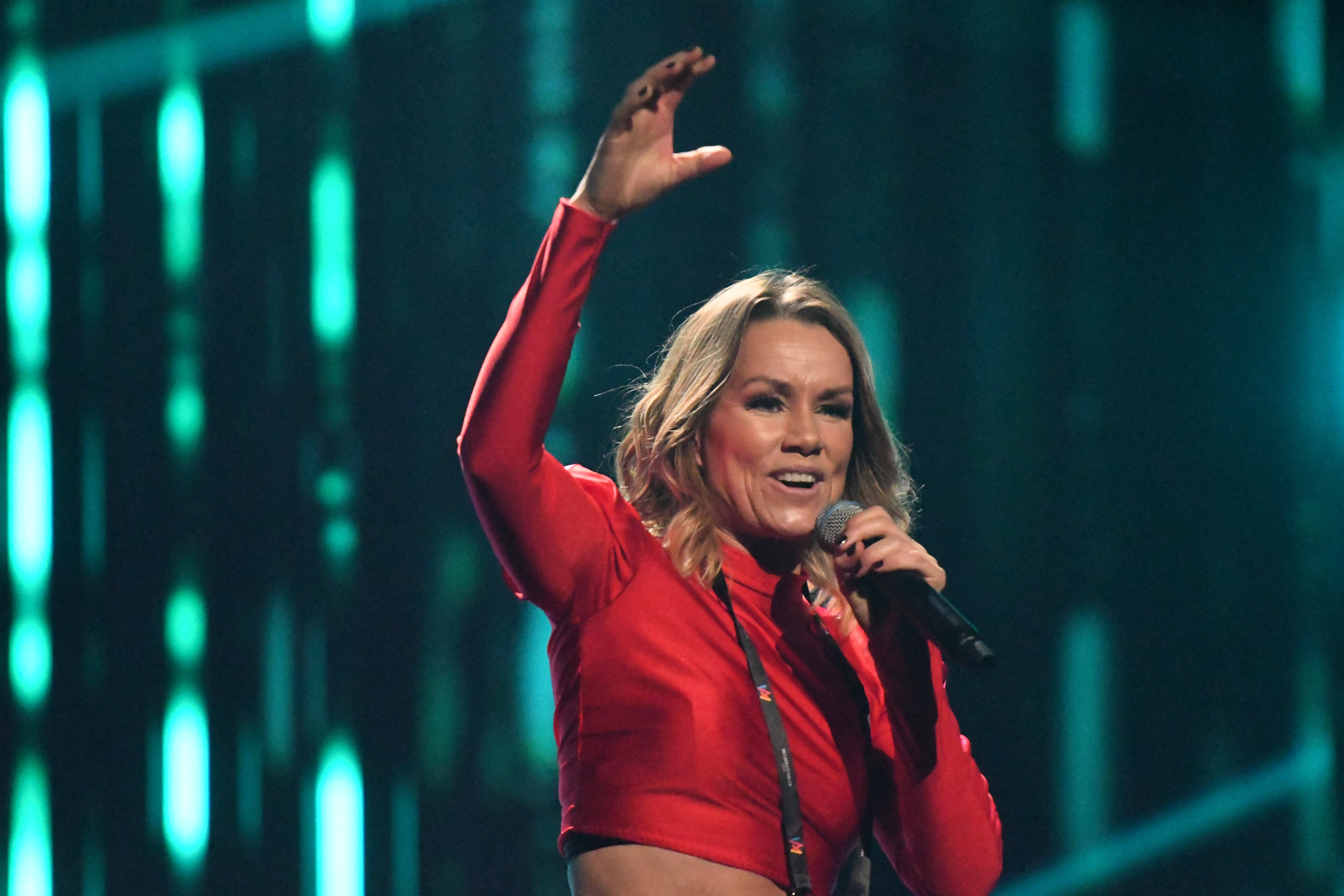
Linda Bengtzing – "Alla mina sorger"

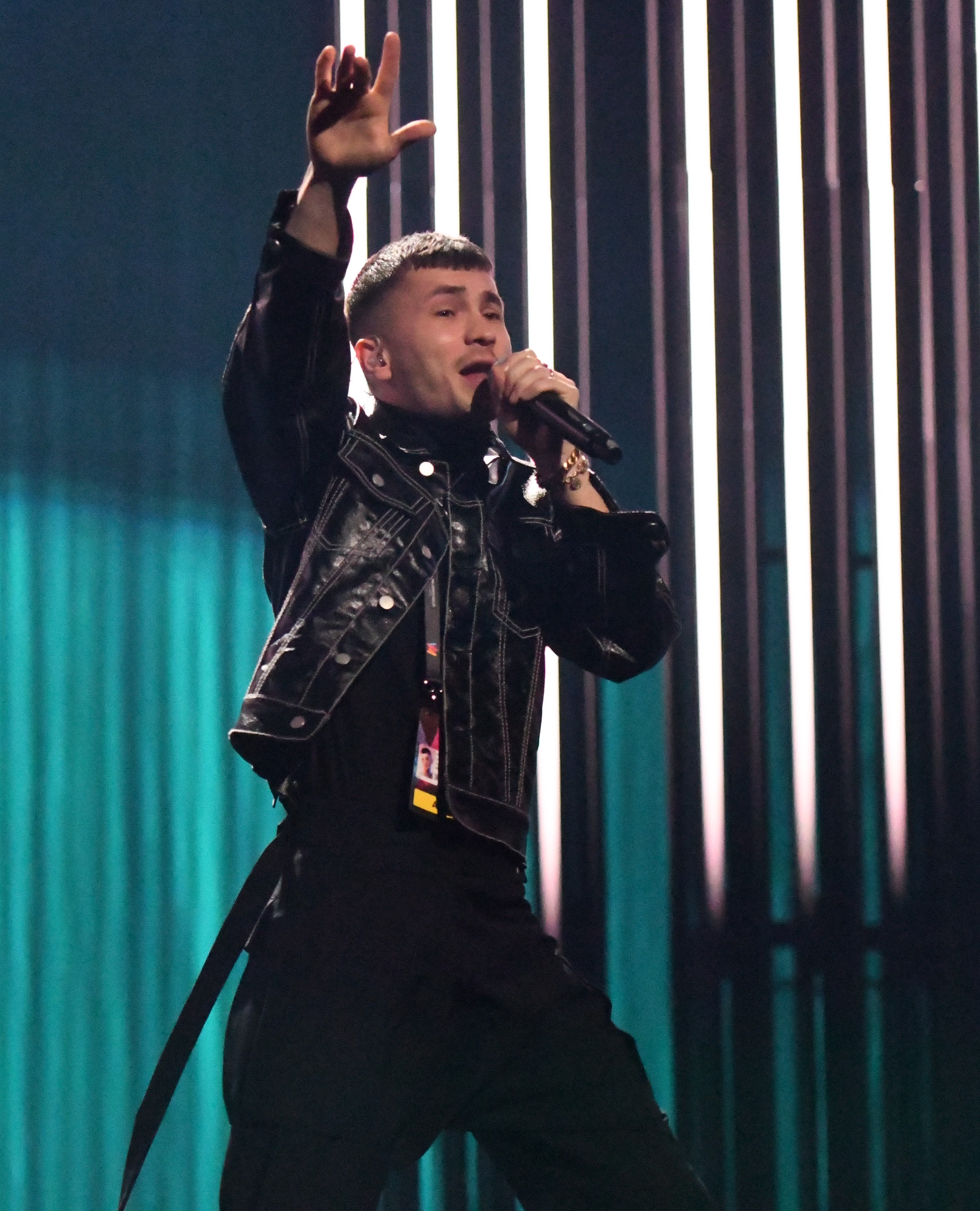
Paul Rey – "Talking in My Sleep"

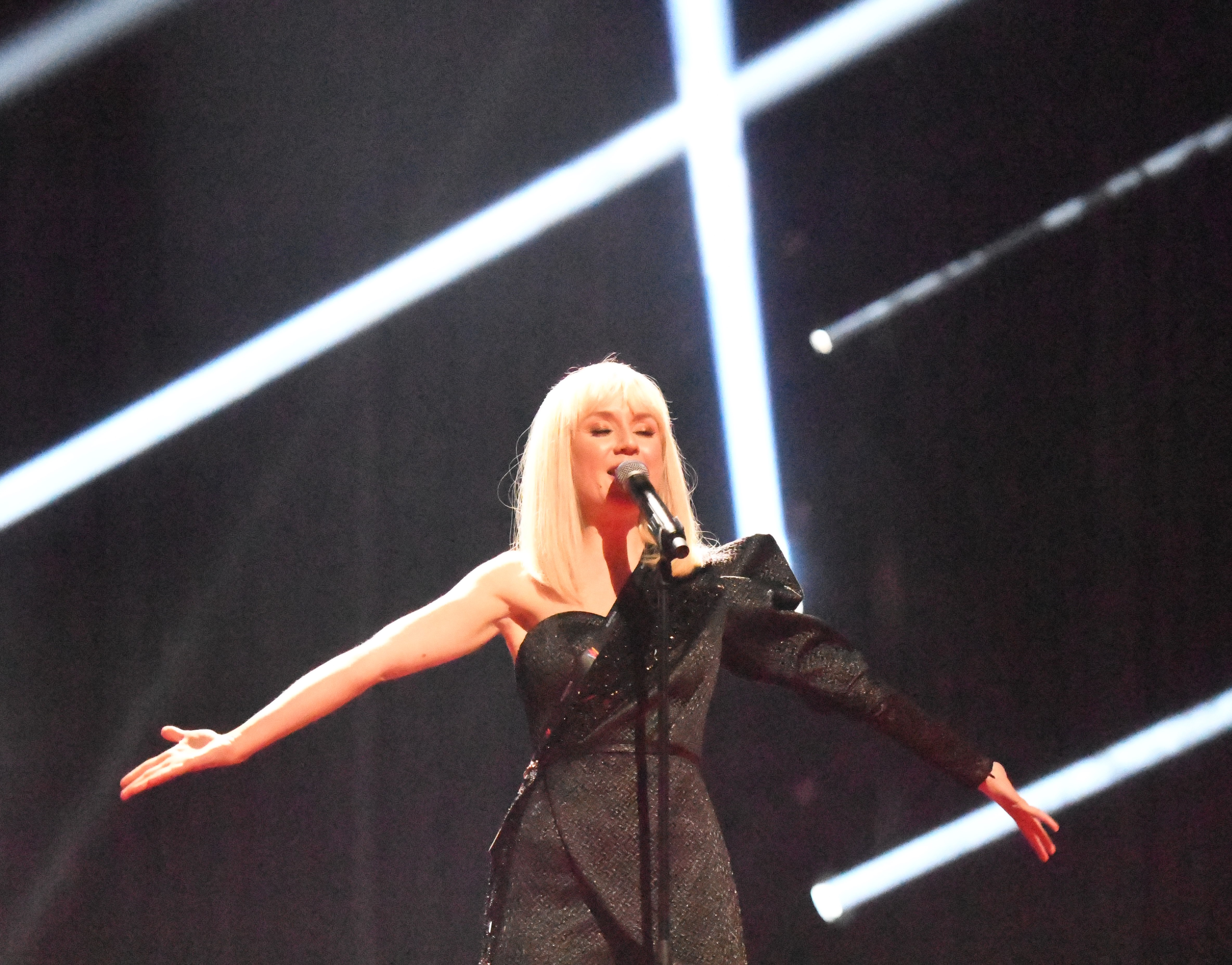
Anna Bergendahl – "Kingdom Come"

=== Heat 4 ===
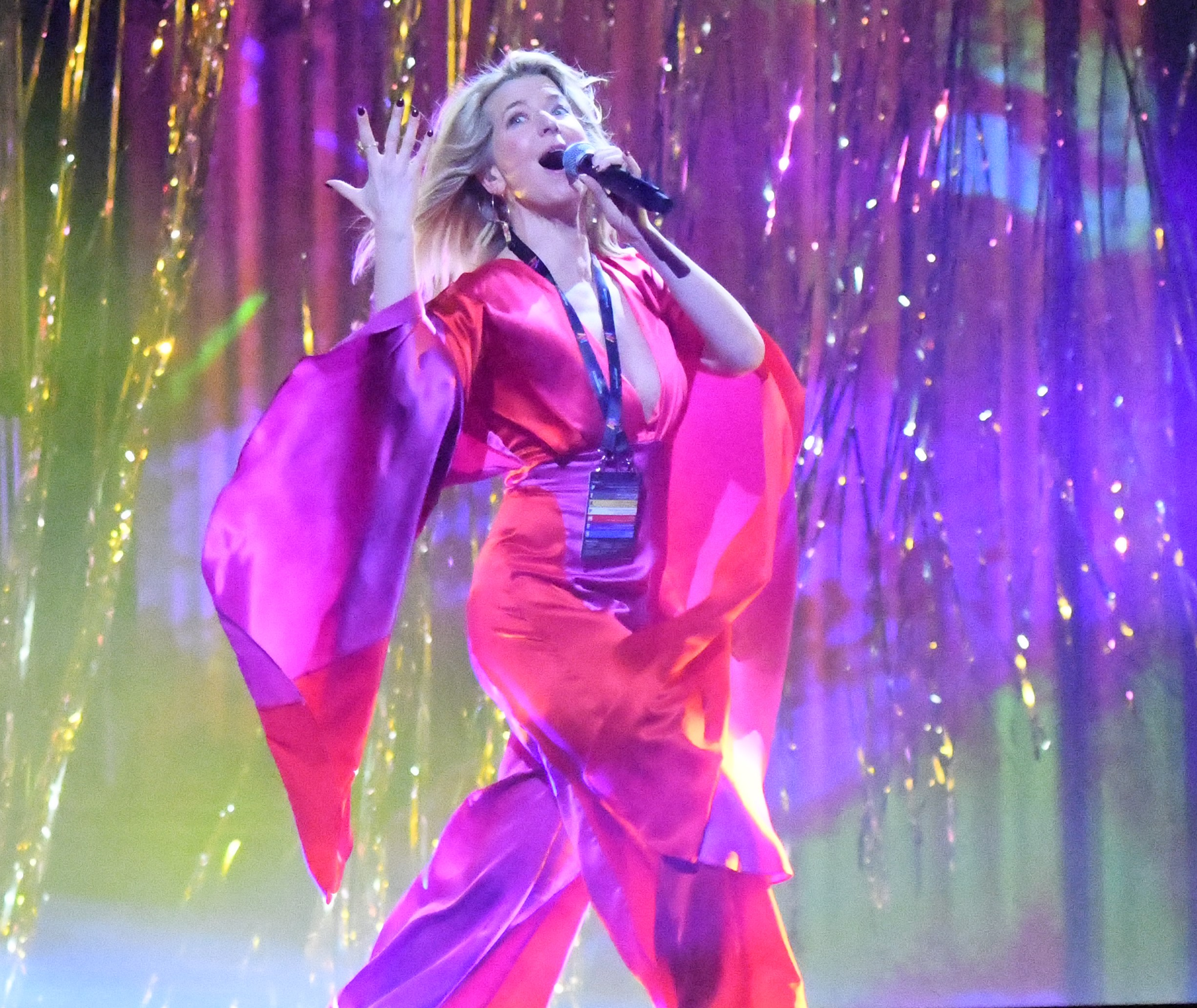
Frida Öhrn – "We Are One"

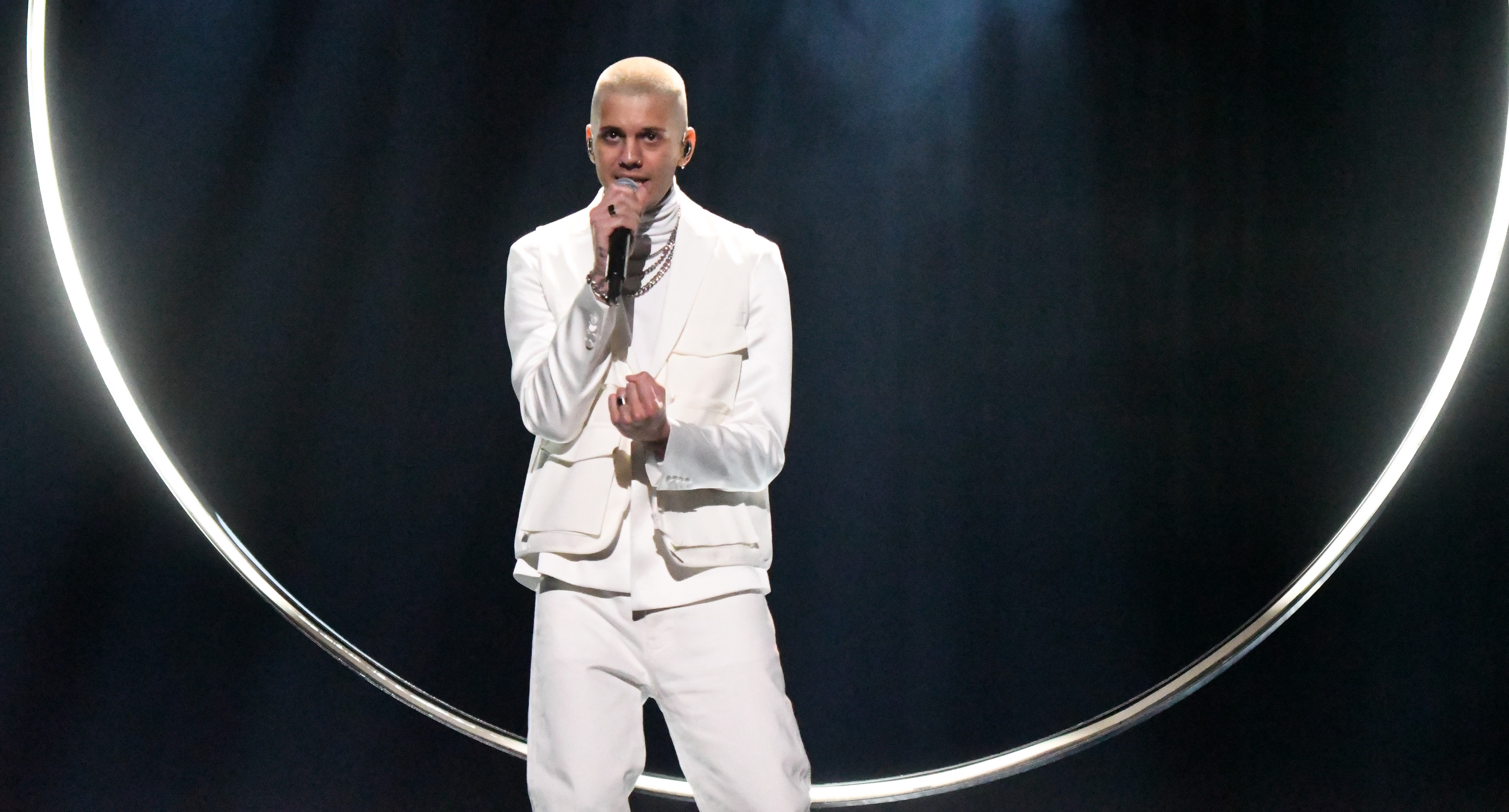
William Stridh – "Molnljus"

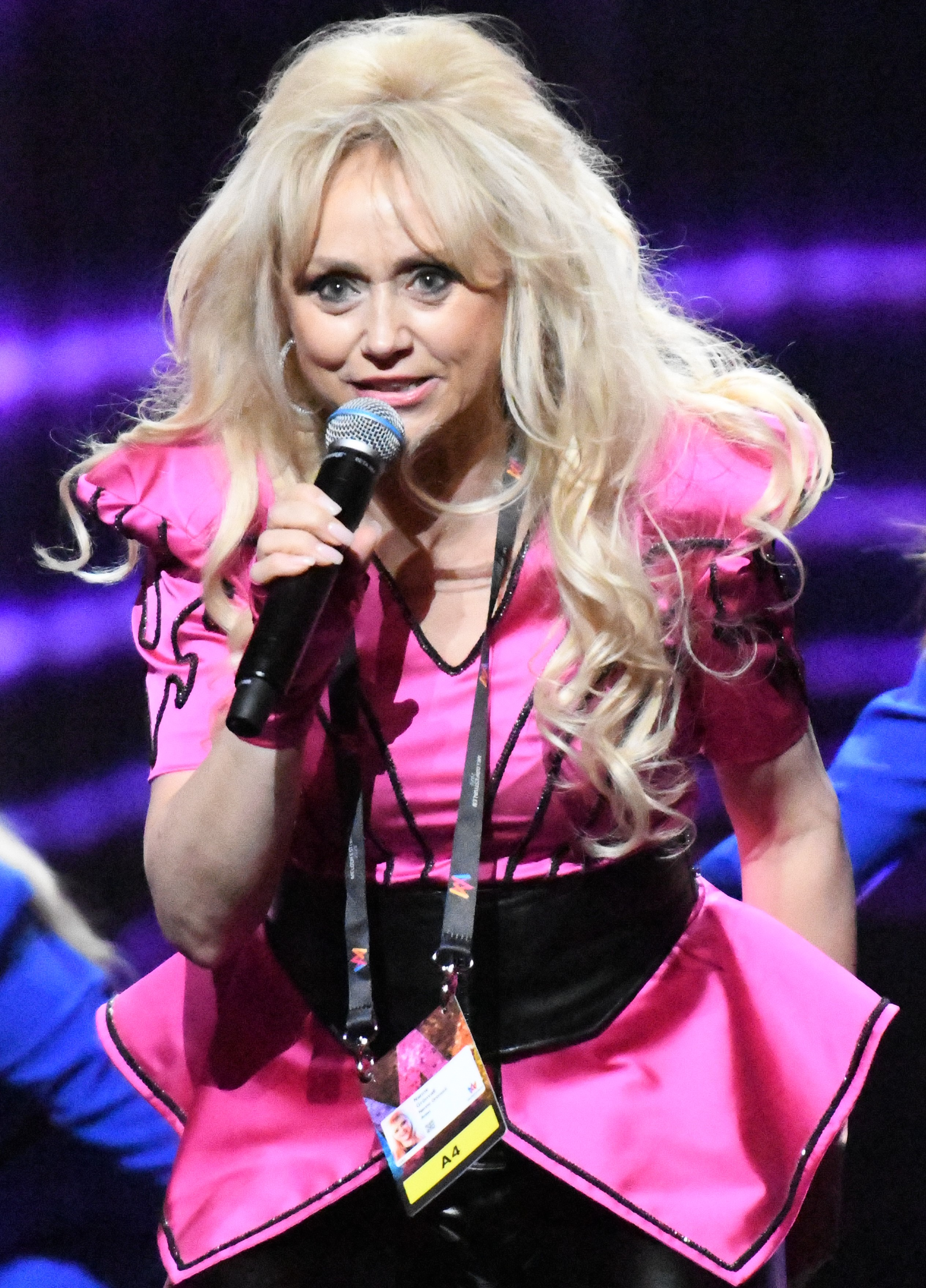
Nanne Grönvall – "Carpool Karaoke"

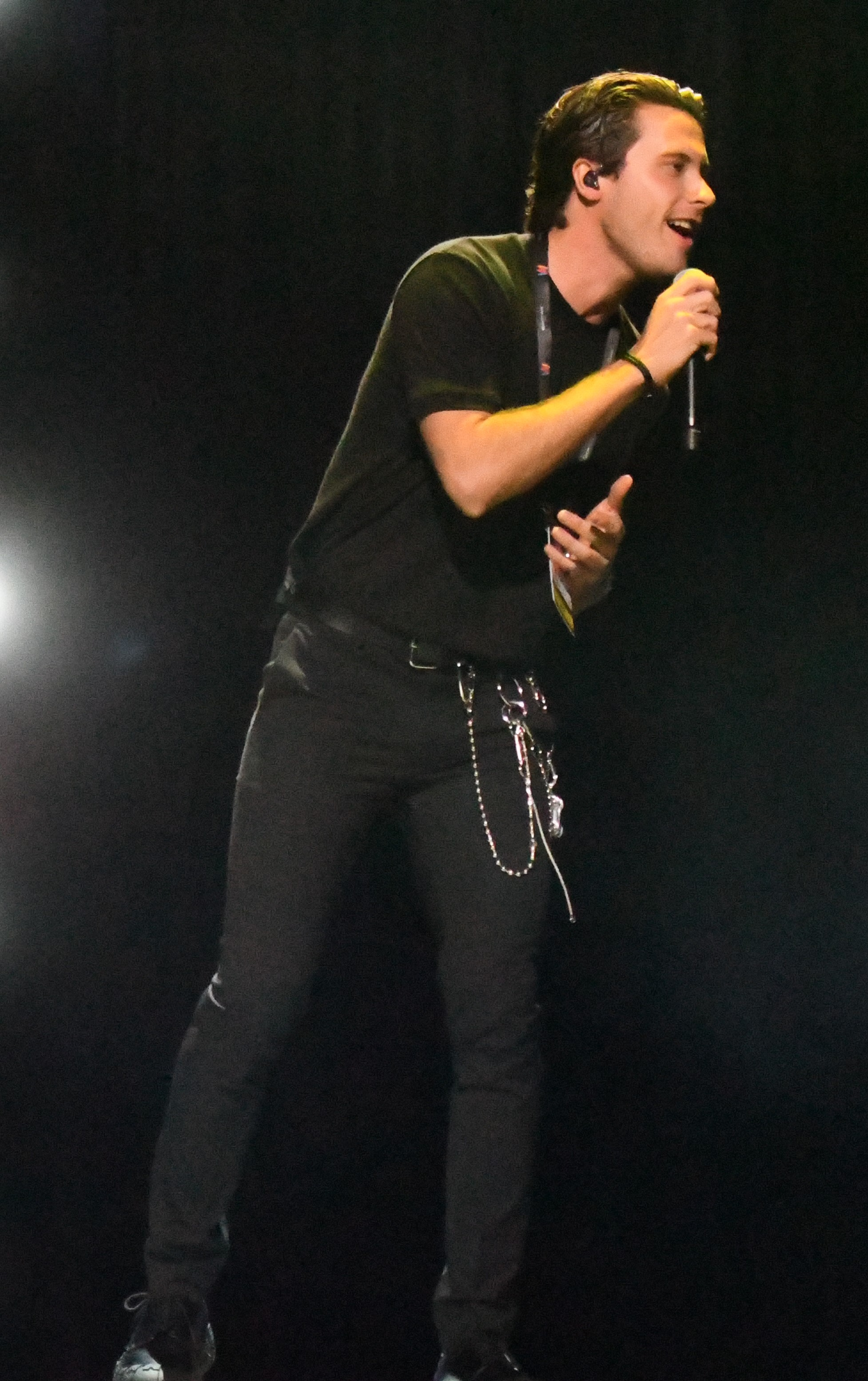
Victor Crone – "Troubled Waters"

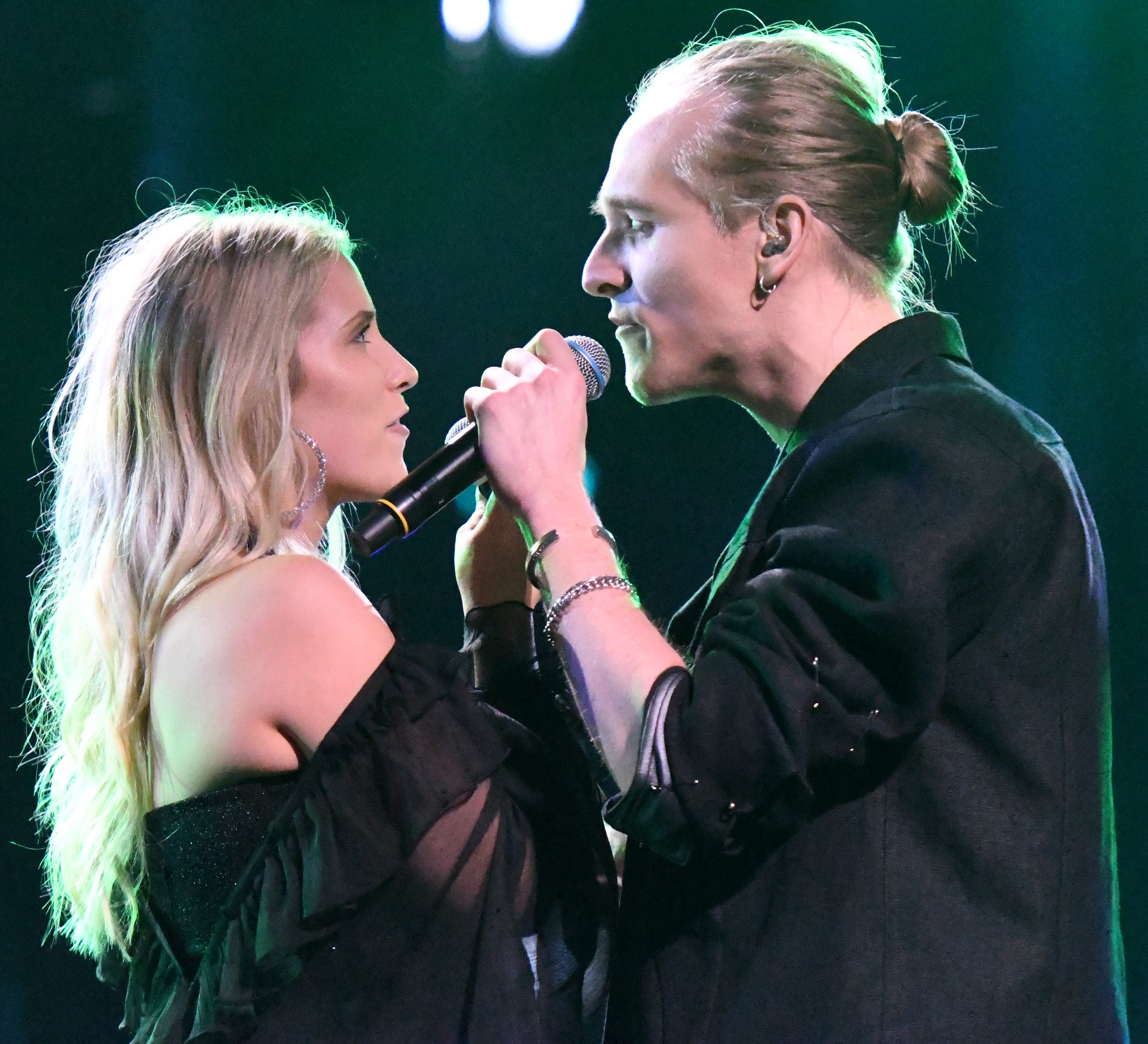
Ellen Benediktson and Simon Peyron – "Surface"

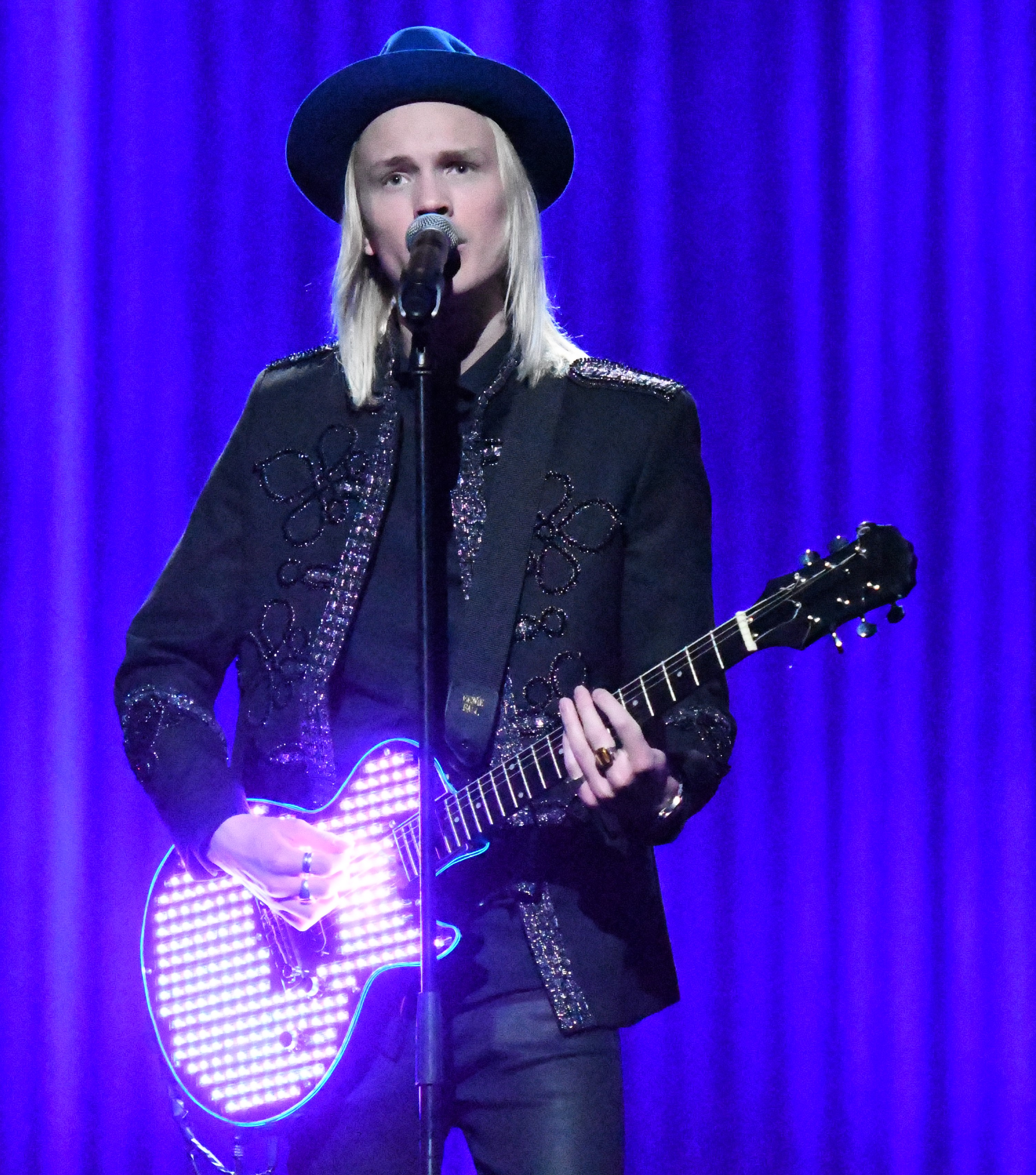
Jakob Karlberg – "Om du tror att jag saknar dig"

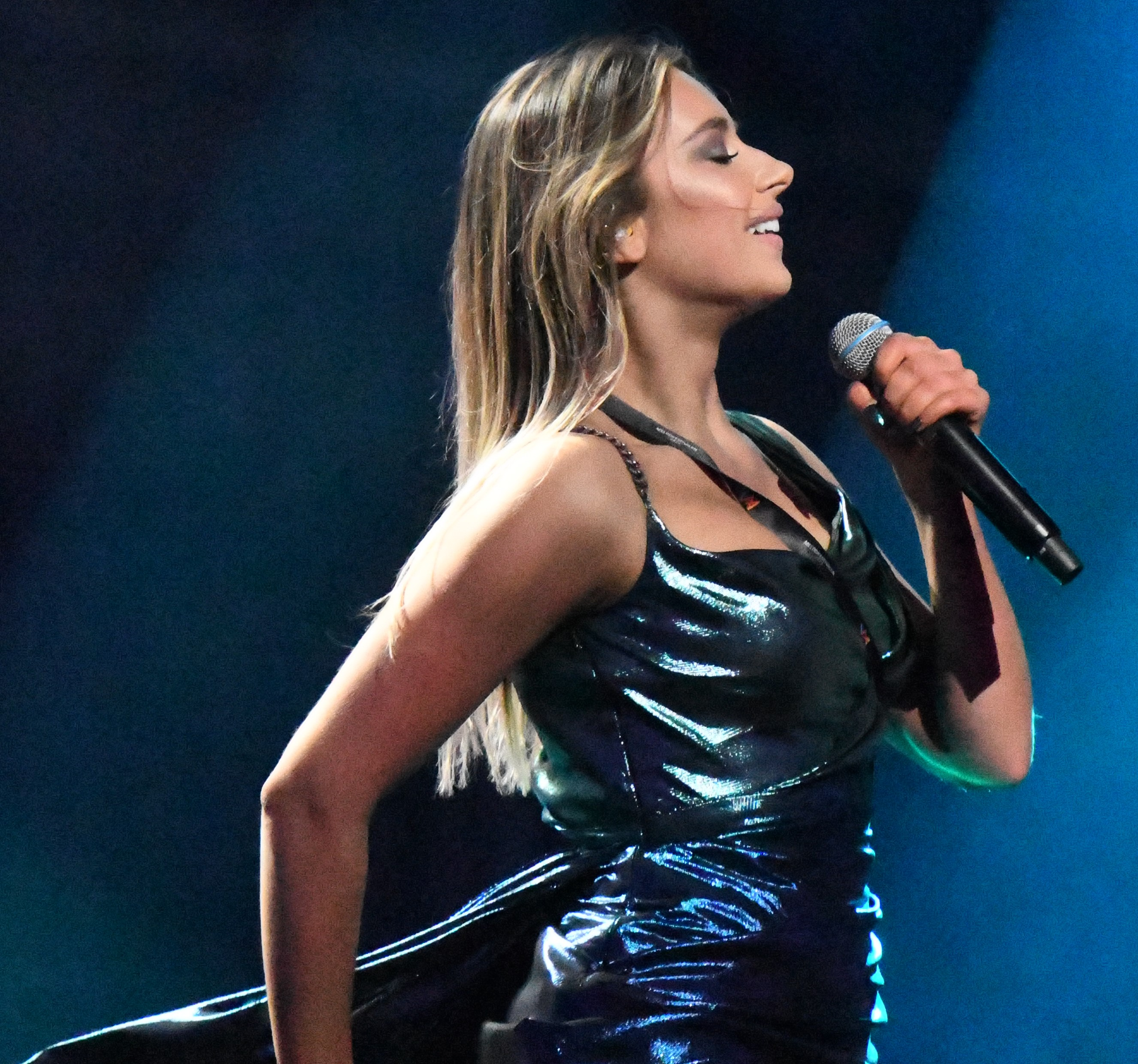
Hanna Ferm – "Brave"
