= Amanda Aasa =

Swedish singer and songwriter (born 1996)

- Birth name: Sigrid Amanda Evangelina Aasa
- Born: 14 October 1996 (age 28); Umeå, Sweden
- Genres: Pop
- Occupation(s): Singer, songwriter
- Years active: 2014–present
- Labels: Dreamhill Music (former)

Sigrid Amanda Evangelina Aasa (born 14 October 1996) is a Swedish singer and songwriter.

Aasa was born in Umeå. After participating in Idol 2014 which was broadcast on TV4, she was contacted by the record label Dreamhill music label and released the debut music single "Wrong Chemistry". Aasa then toured with Miss Li. After her record deal leap out she started studying songwriting and producing at Musikmakarna.

Aasa participated in Melodifestivalen 2020 with the song "Late".

== Discography ==
=== Singles ===
Title	Year	Peak chart positions	Album
Title	Year	SWE Heat.	Album
"Late"	2020	15	Non-album single
