= Stiga Sports Arena =

Multi-purpose arena in Eskilstuna, Sweden

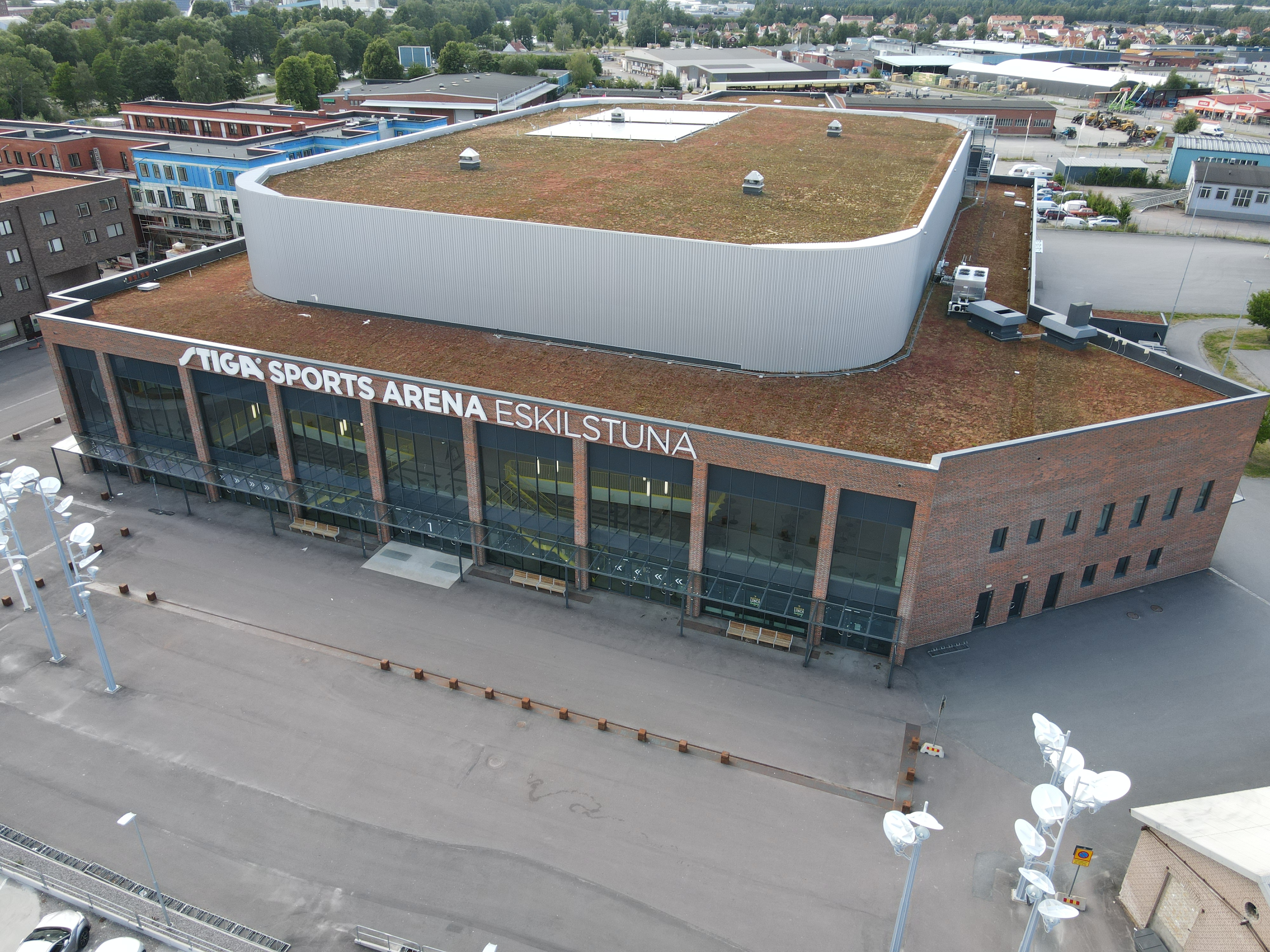
- Interactive map of Stiga Sports Arena
- Full name: Stiga Sports Arena Eskilstuna
- Location: Munktellstaden, Eskilstuna, Sweden
- Coordinates: 59°22′45.5″N 16°30′27.4″E
- Owner: Eskilstuna Guif
- Capacity: 3,700 (sports events) or 5,000 (concerts)

Construction
- Groundbreaking: 25 May 2015
- Built: 6 April 2017 (date of completion)
- Opened: 3 June 2017

Website
- Official website

Stiga Sports Arena Eskilstuna, or simply Stiga Sports Arena, is an indoor venue and sports arena in the Munktellstaden district in central Eskilstuna, Sweden, which is commonly used to host sporting events, such as handball, floorball, and futsal at a national level.

== Construction ==
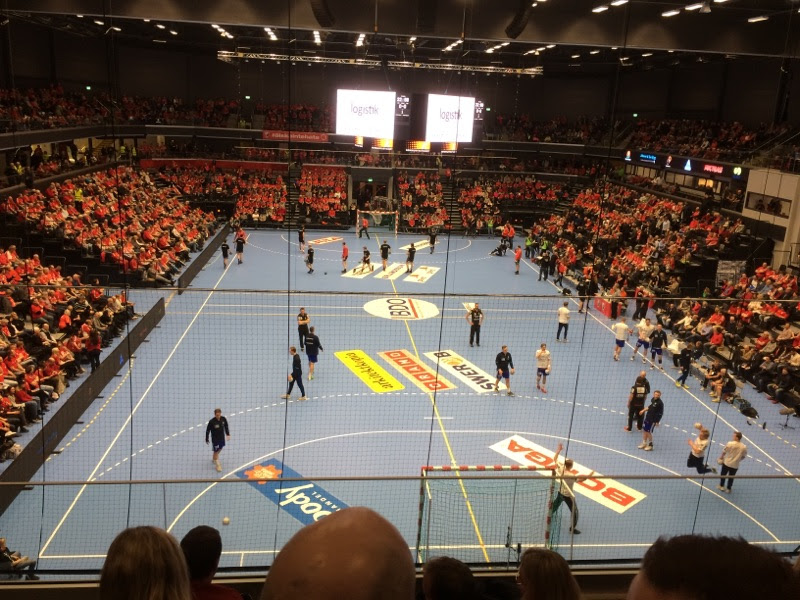
The largest hall in April 2017

The arena has three halls named A (largest), B and C (smallest), with the main arena being approximately 15,600 square meters. Hall A, where Eskilstuna Guif, among others, play their home matches. The arena can hold 3,700 seats for sporting events and up to 5,000 spectators at concerts.

The arena accommodates four full-sized training courts (20 x 40 meters). The A hall accommodates two and can be divided using a curtain wall. The grandstand capacity can be changed down to 3,200 using telescopic stands. Stiga Sports Arena is classified in level gold as an environmental building.

== History ==
In May 2014, the Eskilstuna Municipal Council made the decision to build a new arena and swimming facility, to replace the then Eskilstuna Sporthall and Vattenpalatset and build a new campus for Mälardalen college at that location.

The construction of the arena began on 25 May 2015. The new swimming facility, Munktellbadet, was inaugurated on 28 May 2016.

On 17 January 2017, the name of the new arena was announced, Stiga Sports Arena Eskilstuna. The name came about after the local company Stiga Sports AB made a collaboration agreement with Eskilstuna municipality.

The arena was officially inaugurated on 3 June 2017, but had a sneak premiere for Eskilstuna Guif's men's team already on 6 April 2017.

The arena hosted the Second Chance Round of the 2020 edition of Melodifestivalen on 29 February 2020. It hosted the fourth heat of Melodifestivalen 2024.

== See also ==
- List of indoor arenas in Sweden
