= Troubled Waters (Victor Crone song) =

Single by Victor Crone

from the album Troubled Waters
- Released: 22 February 2020
- Genre: Pop
- Length: 3:00
- Label: Roxy Recordings
- Songwriters: Dino Medanhodzic; Benjamin Jennebo; Victor Crone
- Producers: Lambertain; David Björk

Victor Crone singles chronology
"This Can't Be Love" (2019)	"Troubled Waters" (2020)	"Yes, I Will Wait" (2020)

"Troubled Waters" is a song by Swedish singer Victor Crone. The song was performed for the first time in Melodifestivalen 2020, where it reached the final, finishing in ninth place with a total of 57 points. The song subsequently peaked at number 17 on the Swedish single chart. The single also appears on Crone's debut studio album of the same name.

== Charts ==
Chart (2020)	Peak position
Sweden (Sverigetopplistan)	17
