= Vamos Amigos =

Single by Mendez featuring Alvaro Estrella
- Released: 8 February 2020
- Length: 3:03
- Label: Universal
- Songwriters: Palle Hammarlund; Jimmy Jansson; Jakke Erixson; Leo Mendéz

Mendez singles chronology
"Under the Sea (Bajo el Mar)" (2019)	"Vamos Amigos" (2020)

Alvaro Estrella singles chronology
"Weekend Lover" (2019)	"Vamos Amigos" (2020)	"Mistletoe" (2020)

"Vamos Amigos" is a song by Swedish singers Mendez and Alvaro Estrella. The song was performed for the first time in Melodifestivalen 2020, where it made it to the final through the Second Chance round. The song ended up in eleventh place, scoring a total of 40 points.

== Charts ==
Chart (2020)	Peak position
Sweden (Sverigetopplistan)	12
