= Boys with Emotions =

Single by Felix Sandman
- Released: 1 February 2020
- Length: 2:44
- Label: Artist House; TEN
- Songwriter(s): Felix Sandman; Nicki Adamsson; Philip Bentle; Peter Thomas; Parker James; Tony Ferrari
- Producer(s): Anders Hansson; Nicki Adamsson

Felix Sandman singles chronology
"Mood for You" (2019)	"Boys with Emotions" (2020)	"Don't Look Back in Anger" (2020)

"Boys with Emotions" is a song by Swedish singer Felix Sandman. The song was performed for the first time in Melodifestivalen 2020, where it made it to the final through the Second Chance round. Sandman finished at seventh place with the song, scoring a total of 67 points.

== Charts ==
Chart (2020)	Peak position
Sweden (Sverigetopplistan)	16
