= Alvaro Estrella =

Swedish singer (born 1980)

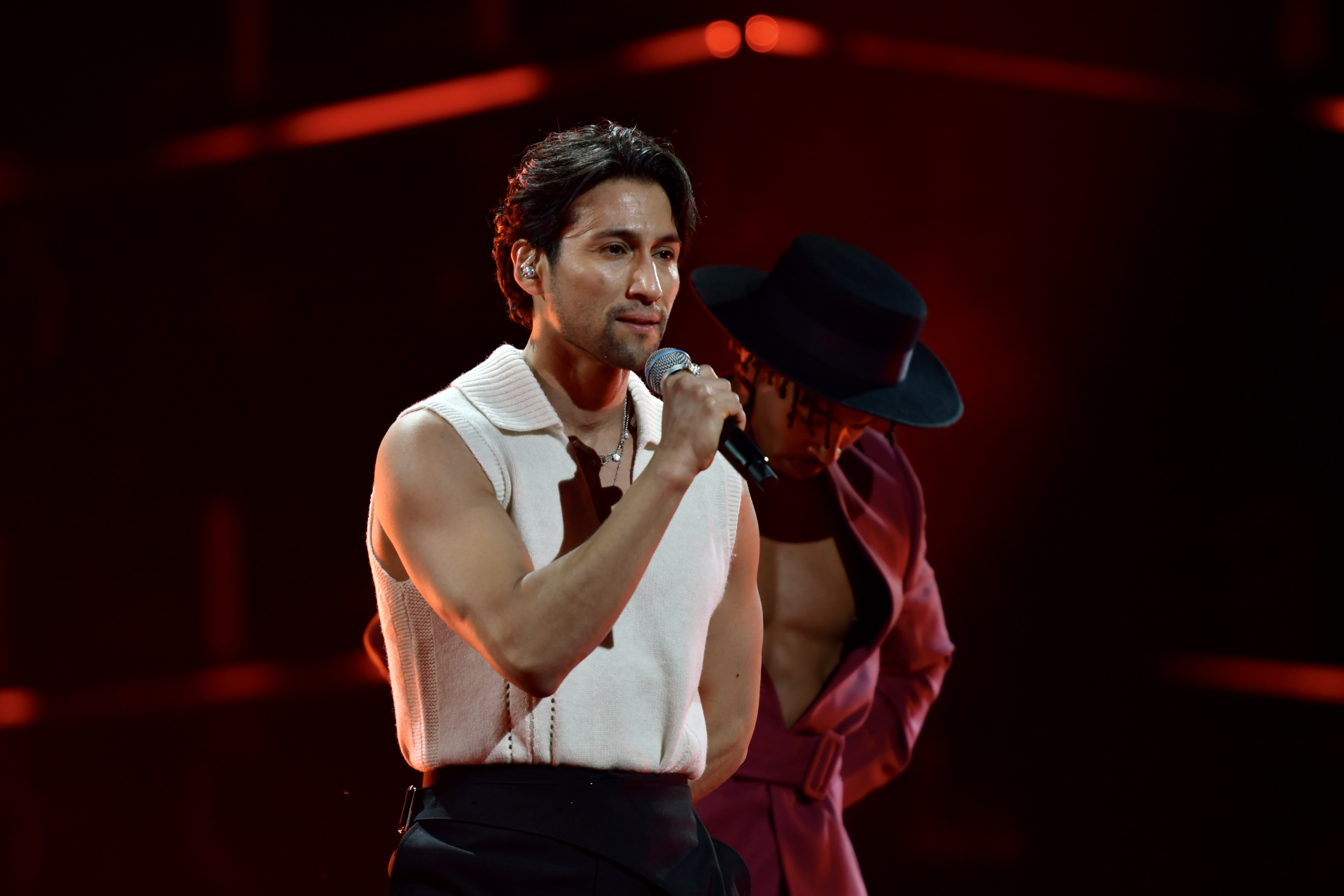
- Estrella rehearsing during Melodifestivalen 2022

Background information
- Born: Álvaro Raúl Estrella Zapata; 14 August 1980 (age 46); Stockholm, Sweden
- Genres: Pop
- Occupations: Singer; dancer
- Labels: X-Level; Universal Music

Álvaro Raúl Estrella Zapata (born 14 August 1980) is a Swedish singer and dancer of Chilean origin who has participated four times in Melodifestivalen (2014, 2020, 2021 and 2022), the selection process for picking the Swedish entry to the Eurovision Song Contest.

== Melodifestivalen ==
In 2014 he competed with the song "Bedroom" written by Jakke Erixson, Jon Bordon, Loren Francis, Kristofer Östergren. He sang in the first semi-final in Malmö but he didn't pass to the final, taking the 6th place.

Estrella has also appeared as dancer for many years in the Melodifestivalen contest including for singer Danny Saucedo in Saucedo's song "Amazing" in 2012.

He participated in Melodifestivalen 2020 with the song "Vamos Amigos" along with Mendez. The song reached the finale through the Second Chance round and ended up in eleventh place, scoring a total of 40 points.

He participated in Melodifestivalen 2021 with the song "Bailá Bailá" performed on 20 February 2021, qualifying to the "andra chansen" (second chance) round, where he won his duel and qualified for the final. He performed in the final on 13 March 2021, finishing in 10th place with a total of 26 points.

He participated in Melodifestivalen 2022 with the song ”Suave”. He performed in Heat 2 on 12 February 2022, qualifying to the semi-final. He performed again on 5 March 2022, failing to qualify to the final.

== Other ventures ==
In 2014, he dubbed the role of the lead character Manolo Sánchez in the Swedish version of the animated film The Book of Life.

He developed a dancing career and has danced for many artists including Danny Saucedo, Eric Saade and others.

== Discography ==
=== Singles ===
Title	Year	Peak chart positions	Certification	Album
Title	Year	SWE	Certification	Album
"Bedroom"	2014	51		Melodifestivalen 2014
"All in My Head"	2014	—		Non-album single
"Side x Side"	2016	—		Non-album single
"Taking You Home"	2018	—		Non-album single
"Weekend Lover"	2019	—		Non-album single
"Vamos Amigos" (Mendez featuring Alvaro Estrella)	2020	12		Melodifestivalen 2020
"Mistletoe"	2020	—		Non-album single
"Bailá Bailá"	2021	8	GLF: Gold	Melodifestivalen 2021
"Suave"	2022	18		Melodifestivalen 2022
"—" denotes a recording that did not chart or was not released.

== Filmography ==
- The Book of Life (2014) – Manolo Sánchez (Swedish dub)
