= DJ Méndez =

Chilean-Swedish musical artist (born 1975)

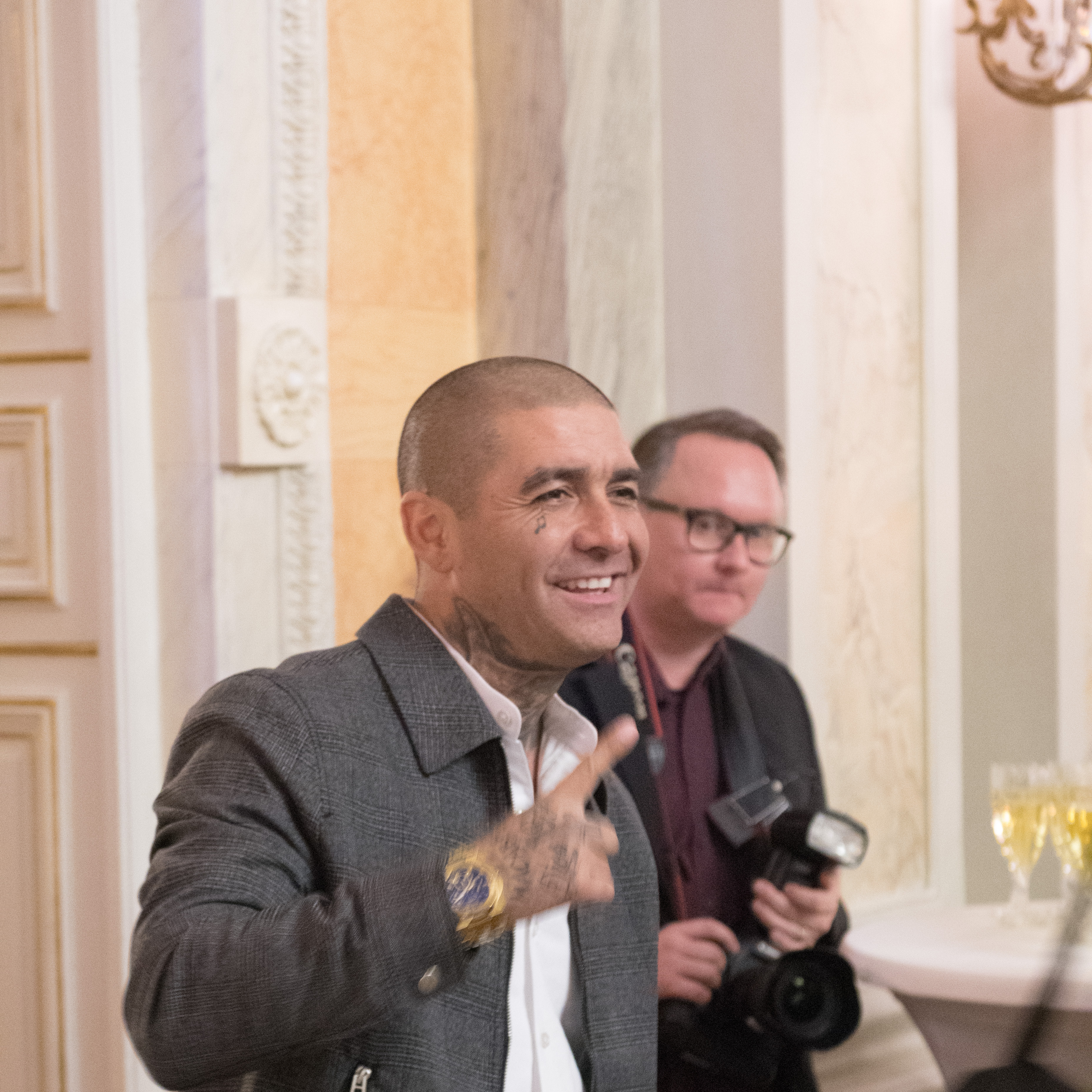
- DJ Méndez in 2018

Background information
- Born: Leopoldo Jorge Méndez Alcayaga; 21 July 1975 (age 50); Valparaíso, Chile
- Origin: Stockholm, Sweden
- Genres: Pop, Rap, Urban, Hip hop
- Occupations: Singer-Songwriter, DJ, Producer
- Years active: 1999–present
- Label: Macabro Records

Leopoldo Jorge Méndez Alcayaga (born 21 July 1975 in Valparaíso) is a Chilean-Swedish DJ, singer and producer, known by his stage name Méndez, formerly DJ Méndez. He won the 2002 MTV Video Music Awards Latinoamérica for Best Southwest New Artist.

== Early life ==
His father was a political dissident, who left Chile after the Chilean regime began monitoring him. In 1986, Méndez, his two brothers and his mother left for Sweden; they lived at various places before settling down in the suburb of Farsta in Stockholm. He went to school in the Larsbodaskolan, in Farsta Strand, joined a gang and was a small-time criminal, though he always had the goal of making it in show business. After several run-ins with the police, he focused on beginning his career.

== Career ==
After joining a counseling institution called Fasta and meeting sound engineer Jordi Fuste, DJ Méndez started his career as a Latin rapper, making his live debut in a local festival. Mixing hip-hop and traditional Latin American rhythms, he was able to get a record deal, soon climbing charts in Sweden, Norway, Denmark, Finland, and even Russia with his first hit "Chiki-Chiki", featured in his debut album Latino for Life. He had met producer Robert Wåtz while working at Toys R Us. The emerging interest for Latin American music in Europe was one factor in the acceptance of his music. Some of his songs like "Estocolmo" feature the attitude and opinion of Latin American immigrants to Scandinavian countries.

His songs are in Chilean Spanish with a mixture of English, produced in conjunction with DJ Rob'n'Raz, have melodic choruses by singers such as Emmanuel Contreras, Martin Thors, Pablo Javier Gonzalez Cepeda (better known as Yei) who were both in their studio recordings and in live performances.

He is one of the best representatives of Chilean rap and hip-hop and one of the Chilean artists with greater international influence. He won an MTV Video Music Award Latinoamérica and was Pre-nominated for the MTV Europe Music Awards in MTV Nordic. He was runner-up in the Melodifestivalen Sweden 2002, he won a Golden Gull at the Festival of Viña del Mar, has taken part in Son Latino Festivals in the Canary Islands, Spain with 350,000 people attending, has performed at a concert for more than 250,000 people in the Red Square of Moscow, Russia, and sung for more than 100,000 people at the Pampilla Festival in Coquimbo. In March 2001 he visited his native country, carrying out a successful promotional tour.

In 2009, Méndez released the single "Lady" in October and the album 210 in December. In 2012, he released "Playing with fire" a Top 40 single en Chile. He sang the anthem for the 2012 Teletón. In 2013, he sang the main theme of Chilean soap opera Dos por uno, a song called "Me estoy volviendo loco". He was also a judge in TV impersonators show Tu cara me suena". That year, he starred in TV reality show Los Méndez, about his family life.

In 2013, he performed at Chilean festivals Viva Dichato and Festival de Antofagasta. In 2015, he sang the official songs for the two football tournaments held that year in Chile, the 2015 Copa América and the 2015 FIFA U-17 World Cup. In January 2017, he took part in reality show Doble tentación with his partner Marcela Duque. He currently manages his own label, Macabro Records, where he supports young emerging musicians, and together with his brother, DJ eMe, manages the largest DJ school in Scandinavia, Macabro DJ School.

He participated in Let's Dance 2019, which was broadcast on TV4.

In 2020, he participated in Melodifestivalen 2020, collaborating with Alvaro Estrella and entering the song Vamos Amigos. They qualified to the final, and finished 11th out of 12 entries on 7 March 2020.

== Personal life ==
Méndez met his former wife Ninoska Espinoza, also Chilean-born, as a teenager. Together they have three children. He is Roman Catholic, and has a tattoo of Jesus Christ, among others. Later in life he met Marcela Duque and together they have one child, he also has two other children with another woman. In total, Méndez has six children.

In 2016, he ran for mayor of Valparaíso as an independent candidate representing the New Majority coalition, but did not win the November election.

== Discography ==
=== Studio albums ===
| Title | Details | Peak chart positions |
| Title | Details | SWE |
|---|---|---|
| Latino for Life | Released: 2000; Label: N/A; Format: Digital download, CD | 27 |
| Méndez | Released: 2001; Label: N/A; Format: Digital download, CD | — |
| Adrenaline | Released: 2002; Label: N/A; Format: Digital download, CD | 23 |
| Perro Perseverante | Released: 2003; Label: N/A; Format: Digital download, CD | — |
| La Máquina | Released: 2005; Label: N/A; Format: Digital download, CD | — |
| Mendez vs. Macabro | Released: 2007; Label: N/A; Format: Digital download, CD | — |
| 210 | Released: 2009; Label: N/A; Format: Digital download, CD | — |
"—" denotes an album that did not chart or was not released.

=== Compilation albums ===
| Title | Details |
|---|---|
| Grandes Éxitos | Released: 2005; Label: N/A; Format: Digital download, CD |

=== Singles ===
| Year | Title | Peak chart positions | | | Album |
| Year | Title | SWE | NOR | FIN | Album |
|---|---|---|---|---|---|
| 1999 | "Chiki-Chiki" | 34 | — | — | Latino for Life |
| 1999 | "Estocolmo" | 37 | — | — | Latino for Life |
| 2000 | "Razor Tongue" | 5 | 19 | — | Latino for Life |
| 2000 | "Fiesta (House Party)" | 13 | — | — | Latino for Life |
| 2001 | "Cross the Border" | 14 | — | — | Adrenaline |
| 2001 | "Blanca" | 21 | — | — | Adrenaline |
| 2002 | "Adrenaline" | 2 | — | — | Adrenaline |
| 2003 | "Carnaval" | 5 | — | — | Perro Perseverante |
| 2003 | "Tequila" | 22 | — | — | Perro Perseverante |
| 2004 | "Ya Po" | — | — | — | Non-album single |
| 2005 | "Is That OK?" | 8 | — | 13 | La Maquina |
| 2006 | "Streetlife" (with Teddy) | 23 | — | — | Streetlife |
| 2009 | "Lady" (with Crossfire) | — | — | — | 210 |
| 2010 | "Ay Ay Ay" (with La Noche) | — | — | — | Non-album singles |
| 2012 | "Touch and Go" (featuring Romina Martin) | — | — | — | Non-album singles |
| 2018 | "Everyday" | 4 | — | — | Non-album singles |
| 2019 | "Under the Sea (Bajo el Mar)" | — | — | — | We Love Disney |
| 2020 | "Vamos Amigos" (featuring Alvaro Estrella) | 12 | — | — | Non-album single |
"—" denotes a single that did not chart or was not released.

== Awards and nominations ==
| Year | Award | Category | Result |
|---|---|---|---|
| 2002 | MTV Video Music Awards Latinoamérica Awards | Best Southwest New Artist | Won |
