= Take a Chance (Robin Bengtsson song) =

Single by Robin Bengtsson
- Released: 22 February 2020
- Length: 3:01
- Label: Universal
- Songwriter(s): Jimmy Jansson; Marcus Winther-John; Karl-Frederik Reichhardt
- Producer(s): Jimmy Jansson; Karl-Frederik Reichhardt

Robin Bengtsson singles chronology
"Just Let It Go" (2019)	"Take a Chance" (2020)	"I Don't Wanna Be" (2020)

"Take a Chance" is a song by Swedish singer Robin Bengtsson. The song was performed for the first time in Melodifestivalen 2020, where it made it to the final. It was released as a digital download in Sweden on 22 February 2020 by Universal. The song peaked at number 13 on the Swedish single chart.

== Track listing ==
Digital download and stream
No.	Title	Length
1.	"Take a Chance"	3:01
2.	"Take a Chance" (Instrumental)	3:01

== Charts ==
Chart (2020)	Peak position
Sweden (Sverigetopplistan)	13

== Certifications ==
Region	Certification	Certified units/sales
Sweden (GLF)	Gold	4,000,000^{†}
^{†} Streaming-only figures based on certification alone.

== Release date ==
Region	Date	Format	Label
Sweden	22 February 2020	Digital download; streaming	Universal
