= Winners (song) =

Single by Mohombi
- Released: 22 February 2020
- Length: 3:05
- Label: Power House; Warner Music Sweden
- Songwriter(s): Jimmy Jansson; Palle Hammarlund; Mohombi

Mohombi singles chronology
"Hello" (2019)	"Winners" (2020)

"Winners" is a song by Swedish singer Mohombi. The song was performed for the first time in Melodifestivalen 2020, where it made it to the final.

== Charts ==
Chart (2020)	Peak position
Sweden (Sverigetopplistan)	24
