= Eric Saade discography =

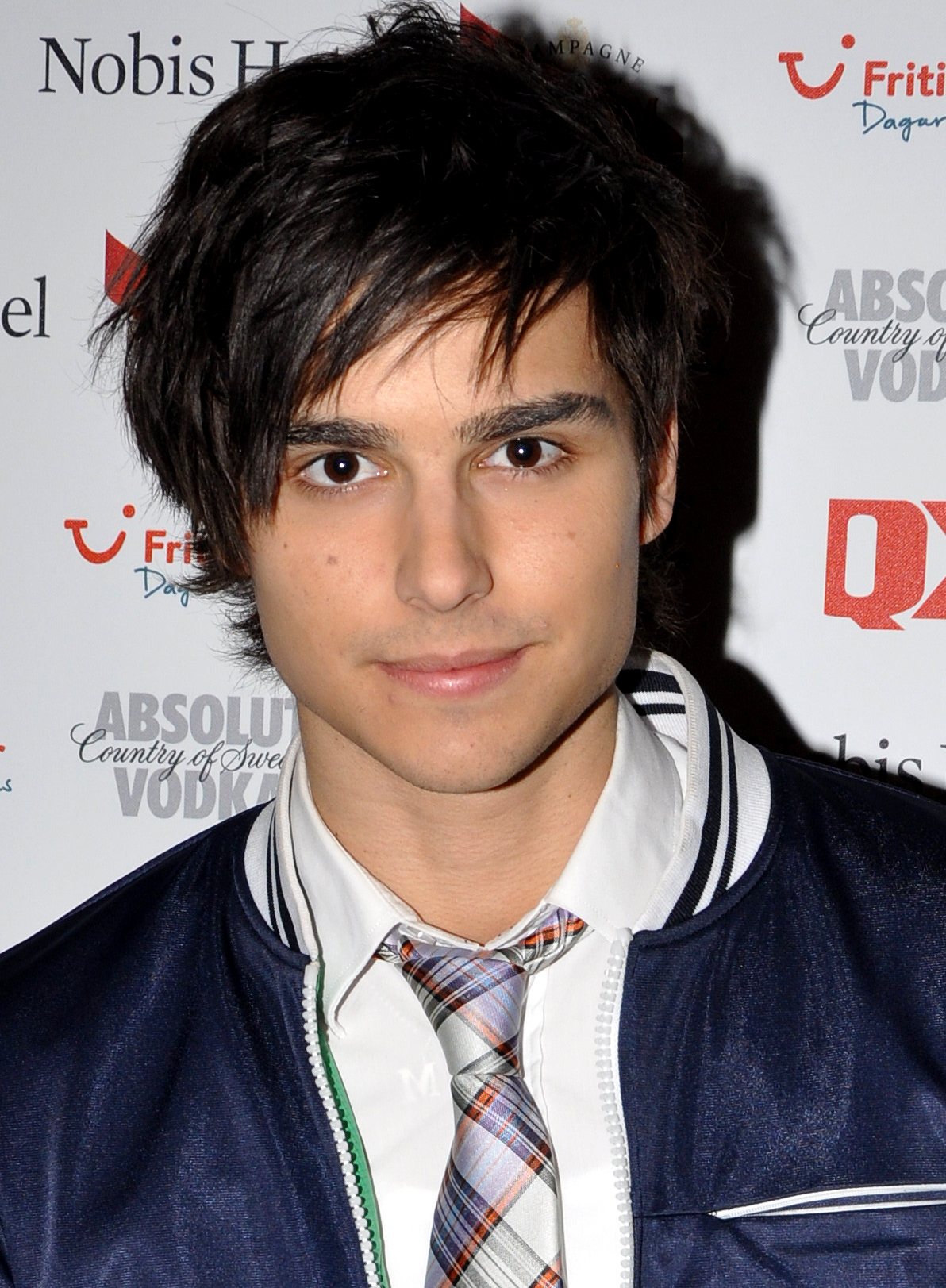
- Studio albums: 5
- Extended plays: 2
- Live albums: 1
- Singles: 27
- Promotional singles: 15

The discography of Swedish singer Eric Saade consists of 5 studio albums, 2 extended plays, 1 live album, 27 singles, and 15 promotional singles. He is also a featured artist on four singles released by other artists. Saade was a member of the pop band What's Up! The band released the 2007 album In Pose peaking at number 40 on Sverigetopplistan, the official Swedish music chart. The band had two charting singles, "Go Girl!" in 2007 and "If I Told You Once" in 2008 peaking at numbers 5 and 16 consecutively on the Swedish charts. Masquerade, Saade's solo debut studio album, was released in May 2010. The album peaked at number 2 on the Swedish Albums Chart, the album includes the singles "Sleepless" and "Break of Dawn". Saade participated in Melodifestivalen 2010 in the 2nd semi-final on 13 February 2010 at the Göransson Arena, Sandviken with the song "Manboy" it achieved third place in the national final on 13 March 2010. Saade Vol. 1, Saade's second studio album, was released in June 2011. The album peaked at number 1 on the Swedish Albums Chart. He represented Sweden in the Eurovision Song Contest 2011 in Düsseldorf, Germany in the second semi-final on 12 May 2011 with the song "Popular". Qualifying for the Final as one of the top 10 on the night, it was also later revealed that he had won the semi-final with the highest number of points. In the Final, Saade came in third place, making Eric Saade the most successful Swedish act in Eurovision since 1999 when Sweden won. The album also includes the single "Hearts in the Air". Saade Vol. 2, Saade's third studio album, was released in November 2011. The album peaked at number 1 on the Swedish Albums Chart, the album includes the single "Hotter Than Fire". Forgive Me, Saade's fourth studio album, was released in August 2013. The album peaked at number 1 on the Swedish Albums Chart, the album includes the singles "Coming Home", "Boomerang" and "Flashy".

In Melodifesitvalen, Saade made his comeback for Melodifestivalen with his entry "Sting", which finished at the fifth place. He released his second extended play, Saade. The second single from the EP, "Wide Awake" reached top ten in Russia. In 2017, Saade participated in the reality television show, Så mycket bättre. The compilation album from the show, Så mycket bättre – Tolkningarna was released in December 2017 and peaked at number 44 in Sweden. His fifth album and first Swedish-language album, Det svarta fåret was released in 2020. Although the album failed to chart in Sweden, it managed to yield one top forty hit, "Postcard". In 2021, Saade again participated in Melodifestivalen, and finished at the second place behind Tusse. Saade's entry, "Every Minute" reached number four in Sweden.

== Albums ==
=== Studio albums ===
Title	Details	Peak chart positions				Certifications
Title	Details	SWE	DEN	FIN	NOR	Certifications
Masquerade	Released: 19 May 2010; Label: Roxy Recordings; Format: CD, digital download	2	—	—	—	GLF: Gold
Saade Vol. 1	Released: 29 June 2011; Label: Roxy Recordings; Format: CD, digital download	1	—	16	—	GLF: Platinum
Saade Vol. 2	Released: 30 November 2011; Label: Roxy Recordings; Format: CD, digital download	1	—	46	—	GLF: Platinum
Forgive Me	Released: 28 August 2013; Label: Roxy Recordings; Format: CD, digital download	1	35	16	24	
Det svarta fåret	Released: 12 June 2020; Label: Warner Music Sweden; Format: Digital download	—	—	—	—	
"—" denotes album that did not chart or was not released.

=== Live albums ===
Title	Details	Peak chart positions	
Title	Details	SWE	FIN
Pop Explosion Live	Released: 22 November 2012; Label: Roxy Recordings; Format: DVD, digital download	1	1

=== Compilation albums ===
Title	Details
Eric Saade: Deluxe	Released: 7 December 2012; Label: Roxy Recordings; Format: CD, digital download

== Extended plays ==
Title	Details	Peak chart positions
Title	Details	SWE
Saade	Released: 24 June 2016; Label: Roxy Recordings; Format: Digital download	—
Så mycket bättre – Tolkningarna	Released: 11 December 2017; Label: Roxy Recordings; Format: CD, digital download	44
"—" denotes album that did not chart or was not released.

== Singles ==
=== As lead artist ===
Title	Year	Peak chart positions									Certifications	Album
Title	Year	SWE	AUT	FIN	FRA	GER	IRE	RUS	UKR	UK	Certifications	Album
"Sleepless"	2009	44	—	—	—	—	—	—	—	—		Masquerade
"Manboy"	2010	1	—	—	—	—	—	—	—	—	GLF: Platinum	Masquerade
"Break of Dawn"	2010	45	—	—	—	—	—	—	—	—		Masquerade
"Popular"	2011	1	29	17	—	48	27	—	—	76	GLF: 2× Platinum	Saade Vol. 1
"Hearts in the Air" (featuring J-Son)	2011	2	—	—	—	—	—	—	—	—	GLF: Gold	Saade Vol. 1
"Hotter Than Fire" (featuring Dev)	2011	5	—	—	—	—	—	—	—	—		Saade Vol. 2
"Coming Home"	2013	—	—	—	—	—	—	—	—	—		Forgive Me
"Forgive Me"	2013	—	—	—	—	—	—	—	—	—		Forgive Me
"Boomerang"	2013	—	—	—	—	—	—	—	—	—		Forgive Me
"Take a Ride (Put 'Em in the Air)"	2014	—	—	—	—	—	—	—	—	—		Non-album single
"Sting"	2015	5	—	—	—	—	—	—	—	—	GLF: 2× Platinum	Melodifestivalen 2015
"Girl from Sweden"	2015	— (Note: "Girl from Sweden" did not enter the Swedish Singles Chart (Sverigetopplistan), but peaked to number 1 on the Sweden Heatseeker Songs.)	—	—	—	—	—	—	—	—		Non-album single
"Colors"	2016	—	—	—	—	—	—	—	—	—		Saade
"Wide Awake" (Note: The version of "Wide Awake" which charted throughout Russia and the CIS region is the "Red Mix" by Filatov & Karas.) (featuring Gustaf Norén)	2016	—	—	—	166	—	—	9	24	—		Saade
"Another Week"	2017	—	—	—	—	—	—	64	—	—		Non-album single
"Så jävla fel"	2018	—	—	—	—	—	—	—	—	—		Det svarta fåret
"Vill ha mer" (featuring Parham)	2018	—	—	—	—	—	—	—	—	—		Det svarta fåret
"Ljuset" (with Sarah Dawn Finer)	2019	—	—	—	—	—	—	—	—	—		Non-album single
"Skit för varandra"	2019	—	—	—	—	—	—	—	—	—		Det svarta fåret
"Postcard" (with Anis don Demina)	2019	35	—	—	—	—	—	—	—	—		Det svarta fåret
"Glas"	2020	—	—	—	—	—	—	—	—	—		Det svarta fåret
"Nån som du"	2020	—	—	—	—	—	—	—	—	—		Det svarta fåret
"Every Minute"	2021	4	—	—	—	—	—	—	—	—		Melodifestivalen 2021
"Day & Night"	2021	—	—	—	—	—	—	—	—	—		TBA
"Like U Used To"	2021	—	—	—	—	—	—	—	—	—		TBA
"Naked Love"	2022	—	—	—	—	—	—	—	—	—		TBA
"—" denotes single that did not chart or was not released.

=== As featured artist ===
Title	Year	Peak chart positions		Certifications	Album
Title	Year	SWE	NOR	Certifications	Album
"Imagine" (Tone Damli featuring Eric Saade)	2012	49	9	NOR: Platinum; GLF: Gold	Looking Back
"Flashy" (A-Lee featuring Eric Saade)	2013	—	—		Forgive Me
"—" denotes single that did not chart or was not released.

=== Promotional singles ===
Title	Year	Peak chart positions	Album
Title	Year	SWE	Album
"Masquerade"	2010	—	Masquerade
"It's Gonna Rain"	2010	—	Masquerade
"Still Loving It"	2011	—	Saade Vol. 1
"Marching (In the Name of Love)"	2012	—	Eric Saade: Deluxe; Forgive Me
"Miss Unknown"	2012	—	Forgive Me
"Winning Ground" (The Official Song of UEFA Women's Euro 2013)	2013	—	Forgive Me
"Du Är Aldrig Ensam"	2014	—	Non-album singles
"Back II Myself"	2016	—	Non-album singles
"Allt man kan önska sig"	2017	70	Så mycket bättre – Tolkningarna
"Bad Sign"	2017	— (Note: "Bad Sign" did not enter the Swedish Singles Chart (Sverigetopplistan), but peaked at number 18 on the Sweden Heatseeker Songs.)	Så mycket bättre – Tolkningarna
"Vill"	2017	— (Note: "Vill" did not enter the Swedish Singles Chart (Sverigetopplistan), but peaked at number 4 on the Sweden Heatseeker Songs.)	Så mycket bättre – Tolkningarna
"Bra vibrationer (Vill ha mer)"	2017	72	Så mycket bättre – Tolkningarna
"Där får du andas ut"	2017	—	Så mycket bättre – Tolkningarna
"We Got the World"	2017	—	Så mycket bättre – Tolkningarna
"Fånga en dröm"	2017	—	Så mycket bättre – Tolkningarna
"—" denotes single that did not chart or was not released.

== Music videos ==
Title	Year	Director
As lead artist
"Sleepless"	2010	Anders Rune
"Manboy" (Acoustic)	2010	Unknown
"Break of Dawn"	2010	Mikeadelica
"Masquerade"	2010	Unknown
"It's Gonna Rain"	2010	Mikeadelica
"Popular" [Censored]	2011	Mikeadelica
"Popular" [Director's Cut]	2011	Mikeadelica
"Hearts in the Air" (featuring J-Son)	2011	Patric Ullaeus/Revolver
"Hotter Than Fire" (featuring Dev)	2012	Tobias Nordquist
"Hotter Than Fire" (LMC Remix) (featuring Dev)	2012	Tobias Nordquist
"Marching (In the Name of Love)"	2012	Tobias Nordquist
"Miss Unknown"	2012	Tobias Nordquist
"Coming Home"	2013	Tobias Nordquist
"Winning Ground"	2013	Nikeisha Andersson
"Forgive Me"	2013	Tobias Nordquist
"Du Är Aldrig Ensam"	2014	Nikeisha Andersson
"Take A Ride (Fan Activity At Liseberg)"	2014	Oscar Berander
"Girl from Sweden"	2015	Alexandra Kentsdottir & Silja-Marie Kentsdottir
"Wide Awake" (featuring Gustav Noren)	2016	Eric Saade
"Wide Awake" [Red Mix] (featuring Gustaf Norén & Filatov & Karas)	2016	Eric Saade
"Another Week"	2017	LMDL.
"Så jävla fel"	2018	Fritz Dölling & Eric Saade
"Postcard" (with Anis Don Demina)	2019	Unknown
"Glas"	2020	Unknown
As featured artist
"Imagine" (Tone Damli featuring Eric Saade)	2012	Joon Brandt

== See also ==
- Sweden in the Eurovision Song Contest 2011
- Sweden in the Eurovision Song Contest
