= Masquerade (Eric Saade album) =

Studio album by Eric Saade
- Released: 19 May 2010
- Recorded: 2009–2010
- Genre: Dance-pop; Europop
- Length: 39:19
- Label: Roxy Recordings
- Producer: Dimitri Stassos; Jason Gill; Peter Boström; Harry Sommerdahl

Eric Saade chronology
Masquerade (2010)	Saade Vol. 1 (2011)

Singles from Masquerade
- 1. "Sleepless" Released: 21 December 2009; 2. "Manboy" Released: 28 March 2010; 3. "Break of Dawn" Released: 28 June 2010

Masquerade is the debut studio album by Swedish singer Eric Saade. It was released on 19 May 2010 in Sweden, by Roxy Recordings. After leaving the boy band, What's Up!, Saade began his career as a solo singer, releasing the debut single "Sleepless" in 2009. The album peaked at number two in Sweden and has been certified gold by the Swedish Recording Industry Association (GLF).

Masquerade was supported by the release of three singles. The solo debut single, "Sleepless" was a moderate hit, reaching number 44 in Sweden. The second single, Manboy, was his entry song for the Melodifestivalen 2010, where he finished at the third place. The single gave Saade his first number one single in Sweden. "Break of Dawn" was released as the third single from the album, reaching top fifty and becoming his third consecutive charting single.

== Promotion ==
=== Tour ===
In June 2010 Saade embarked on the Masquerade Tour, his first nationwide tour in support of the album. The 33-date tour included the performances at the several music festivals including Rix FM Festival, Rockoff Festival, and Allsång på Solgården, and the pride event in Tampere, Finland.

=== Singles ===
"Sleepless" was released on 21 December 2009 as the first single from Masquerade. The song marked Saade's debut as a solo singer, after leaving the boy band What's Up!. Commercially, "Sleepless" was a moderate success, peaking at number forty-four in Sweden.

"Manboy" was released as the album's second single on 28 March 2010. Saade performed the song at the Melodifestivalen 2010 and eventually finished at the third place. Commercially, "Manboy" topped the Swedish Singles Chart and has been certified platinum by the Swedish Recording Industry Association (GLF).

"Break of Dawn" was released as the third single from the album on 28 June 2010. The song, written by Saade and Fredrik Kempe, peaked at number forty-five in Sweden and became Saade's third consecutive charting single.

== Accolades ==
Masquerade won the Scandipop Award 2011 for Best Album from a New Artist, as well as being nominated for Best Male Album.

== Commercial performance ==
Masquerade entered the Sweden's Sverigetopplistan chart at number two, behind the reissue of The Rolling Stones album, Exile on Main St. (1972). The album remained on the charts for non-consecutive 58 weeks, becoming his longest-charting album as of September, 2020. Masquerade has been certified gold by the Swedish Recording Industry Association (GLF).

== Track listing ==
Masquerade CD and digital download track listing
No.	Title	Writer(s)	Producer(s)	Length
1.	"Masquerade"	Anton Malmberg Hård af Segerstad; Eric Saade; Tony Malm	Dimitri Stassos; Jason Gill	3:43
2.	"Upgrade"	Alexander Jonsson; Björn Djupström; Charlie Mason	Peter Boström	3:08
3.	"Break of Dawn"	Saade; Fredrik Kempe	Harry Sommerdahl	3:31
4.	"It's Gonna Rain"	Kempe	Boström	3:55
5.	"Manboy"	Kempe; Boström	Boström	3:00
6.	"Say It"	Gustav Efraimsson; Hayden Bell; Sarah Lundback	Dimitri Stassos; Gill	3:34
7.	"Sleepless"	Kempe; Boström	Boström	3:24
8.	"I'll Be Alright"	Stassos; Saade; Gill; Mikaela Stenström	Stassos; Gill	3:17
9.	"Radioactive"	Stassos; Stenström	Stassos; Gill	3:57
10.	"Why Do We Need Fashion!?"	Hård Af Segerstad; Saade; Niklas Lundin	Stassos; Gill	3:18
11.	"It's Like That With You"	Alexander Kronlund; Stephanie Bentley	Stassos; Gill	4:32
Total length:				39:19

== Personnel ==
Adapted from the album's liner notes.

=== Vocals ===
- Eric Saade – vocals (all tracks)
- Jason Gill – backing vocals (1, 4, 6, 8, 9, 10)
- Mikaela Stenström - backing vocals (1, 8, 9, 10)
- Anna Sahlin - backing vocals (2)
- Harry Sommerdahl - backing vocals (3)
- Helena Tellberg - backing vocals (3)
- Emil Heiling - backing vocals (5)
- Jeanette Olsson - backing vocals (5, 7)
- Figge Boström - backing vocals (8)
- Dimitri Stassos - backing vocals (9, 10)

=== Instrumentation ===
- Dimitri Stassos - bass (1, 6, 8, 9, 10), guitar (1, 4, 6, 8, 9, 10)
- Jason Gill - all instruments (1, 8, 9, 10, 11)
- Pontus Söderqvist - guitar (2, 5, 7), bass (3)
- David Gammelgård - cello (3)
- Pelle Hansen - cello (3)
- Tomas Lundström - cello (3)
- Sigrid Granit - double bass (3)
- Esbjörn Öhrwall - guitar (3)
- Carin Wallgren - viola (3)
- Eriikka Nylund - viola (3)
- Göran Fröst - viola (3)
- Riikka Repo - viola (3)
- Anna Larsson - violin (3)
- Daniela Bonfiglioli - violin (3)
- Erik Arvinder - violin (3)
- Erik Liljenberg - violin (3)
- Fredrik Syberg - violin (3)
- Karin Eriksson - violin (3)
- Kristina Ebbersten - violin (3)
- Martin Stensson - violin (3)
- Patrik Swedrup - violin (3)
- Paul Waltman - violin (3)
- Simona Bonfiglioli - violin (3)
- Micke Svahn - piano (11)

=== Production ===
- Dimitri Stassos - production (1, 6, 8, 9, 10, 11)
- Jason Gill - production (1, 6, 8, 9, 10, 11)
- Peter Boström - production (2, 4, 5, 7)
- Harry Sommerdahl - production (3)

=== Technical ===
- Anton Malmberg Hård Af Segerstad - string arranging (1, 10), programming (1, 10)
- Dimitri Stassos - string arranging (1)
- Erik Arvinder - string arranging (3), recording engineer (3)
- Dimitri Stassos - string arranging (8), recording engineer (1, 6, 8, 9, 10, 11)
- Jason Gill - string arranging (11)
- Harry Sommerdahl - programming (3), recording engineer (3)
- Anders Hvenare - mixing (1, 6, 8, 9, 10, 11)
- Peter Boström - mixing (2, 4, 7)
- Ollie Olson - mixing (3)
- Ronny Lahti - mixing (5)
- Ian Agate - recording engineer (3)
- Stefan Olsson - recording engineer (3)

=== Design ===
- Micke - design
- Linus Hallsénius - photograph

== Charts ==
=== Weekly charts ===
Chart (2010)	Peak position
Swedish Albums (Sverigetopplistan)	2

=== Year-end charts ===
Chart (2010)	Position
Swedish Albums (Sverigetopplistan)	29

== Certifications ==
Certifications for Masquerade
Region	Certification	Certified units/sales
Sweden (GLF)	Gold	20,000^{‡}
^{‡} Sales+streaming figures based on certification alone.

== Release history ==
Country	Date	Format	Label
Sweden	19 May 2010	CD, digital download	Roxy Recordings
