= Battle of Kattarp =

Dano-Swedish battle

- Part of the Dano-Swedish War (1657–1658)
Date	3 October, 1657 (O.S.); 13 October, 1657 (N.S.)
Location	Kattarp, Scania
Result	Disputed, see result

Belligerents
(yes) Swedish Empire	Denmark–Norway

Commanders and leaders
(Swedish Empire) Gustaf Otto Stenbock (Swedish Empire) Gustaf Banér (Swedish Empire) Preuss (Swedish Empire) Svinhufvud (Swedish Empire) Påfvenfelt	(Denmark–Norway) Frederick III

Units involved
(Swedish Empire) Östgöta Regiment (Swedish Empire) Södermanland Regiment (Swedish Empire) Uppland Regiment (Swedish Empire) Adelsfanan	(Denmark–Norway) Gyldenløve’s regiment

Strength
5,000 men Several guns	7,000 men

Casualties and losses
68 killed 63 wounded 43 captured	100 killed, wounded, or captured

The Battle of Kattarp was fought on 3 October (O.S.) or 13 October (N.S.) between Danish and Swedish forces at Kattarp, commanded by King Frederick III and Gustaf Otto Stenbock respectively during the Dano-Swedish War of 1657–1658.

== Background ==
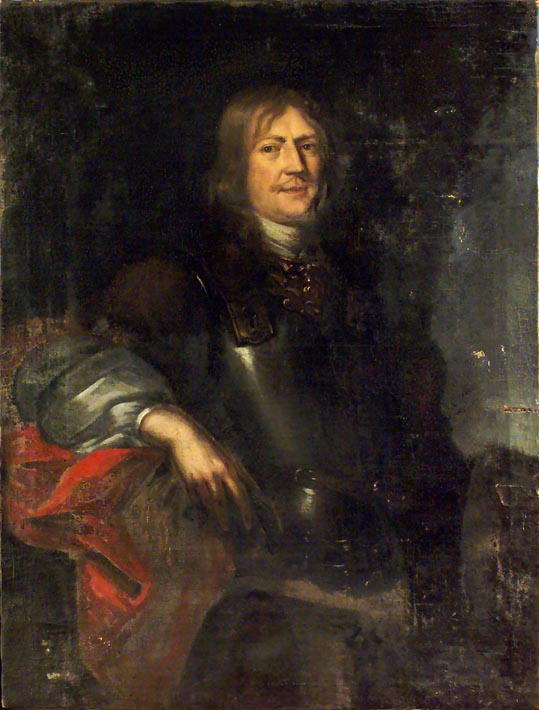
Portrait of Gustaf Otto Stenbock by David Klöcker Ehrenstrahl

During the Dano-Swedish War of 1657–1658, one of the Swedish generals, Gustaf Otto Stenbock, wanted to go on an offensive into Danish territory, however, the Danes blocked his path into Scania and the supply situation for the Swedish army was deteriorating. Accordingly, Stenbock withdrew to Fagerhult, and for a while, operations ceased.

However, new Danish reinforcements later arrived, and so did King Frederick III, who on 11 October joined the Danish army in Scania, and the Danes now outnumbered the Swedes, who then had a strength of some 5,000 men. As a result, Stenbock withdrew further north into Halland. During his retreat, Stenbock's forces encountered the Danish army on 3 October / 13 October at Kattarp, some 11 kilometers east of Laholm. Earlier during the campaign, the Danes had been plagued by slow advances.

== Battle ==
Believing that the Danes were far away, Stenbock felt safe, and didn't send out sufficient patrols into the area, which forced the Swedes to accept battle while still in march formation.

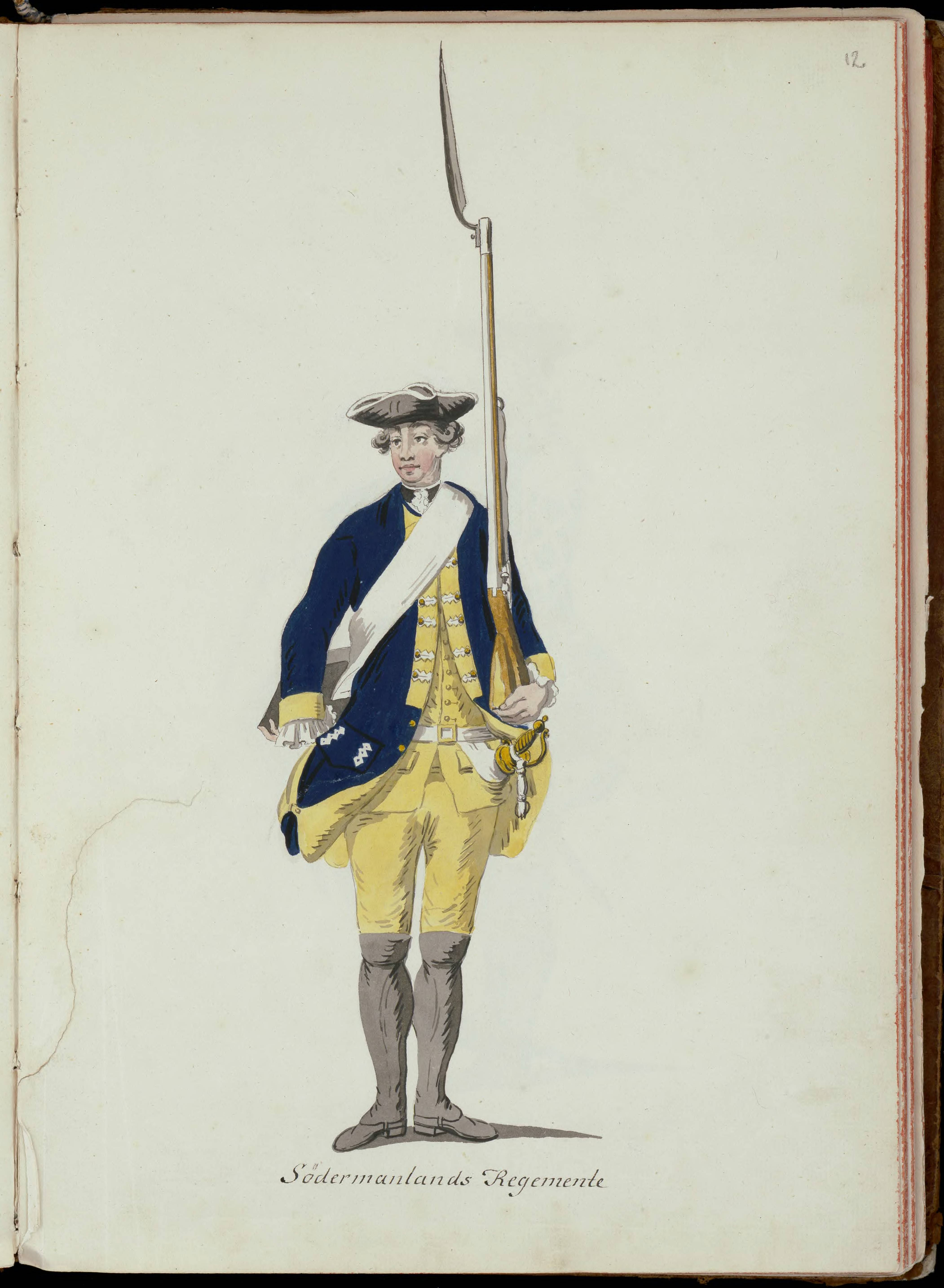
Drawing of a musketman from the Södermanland Regiment, drawn in 1765

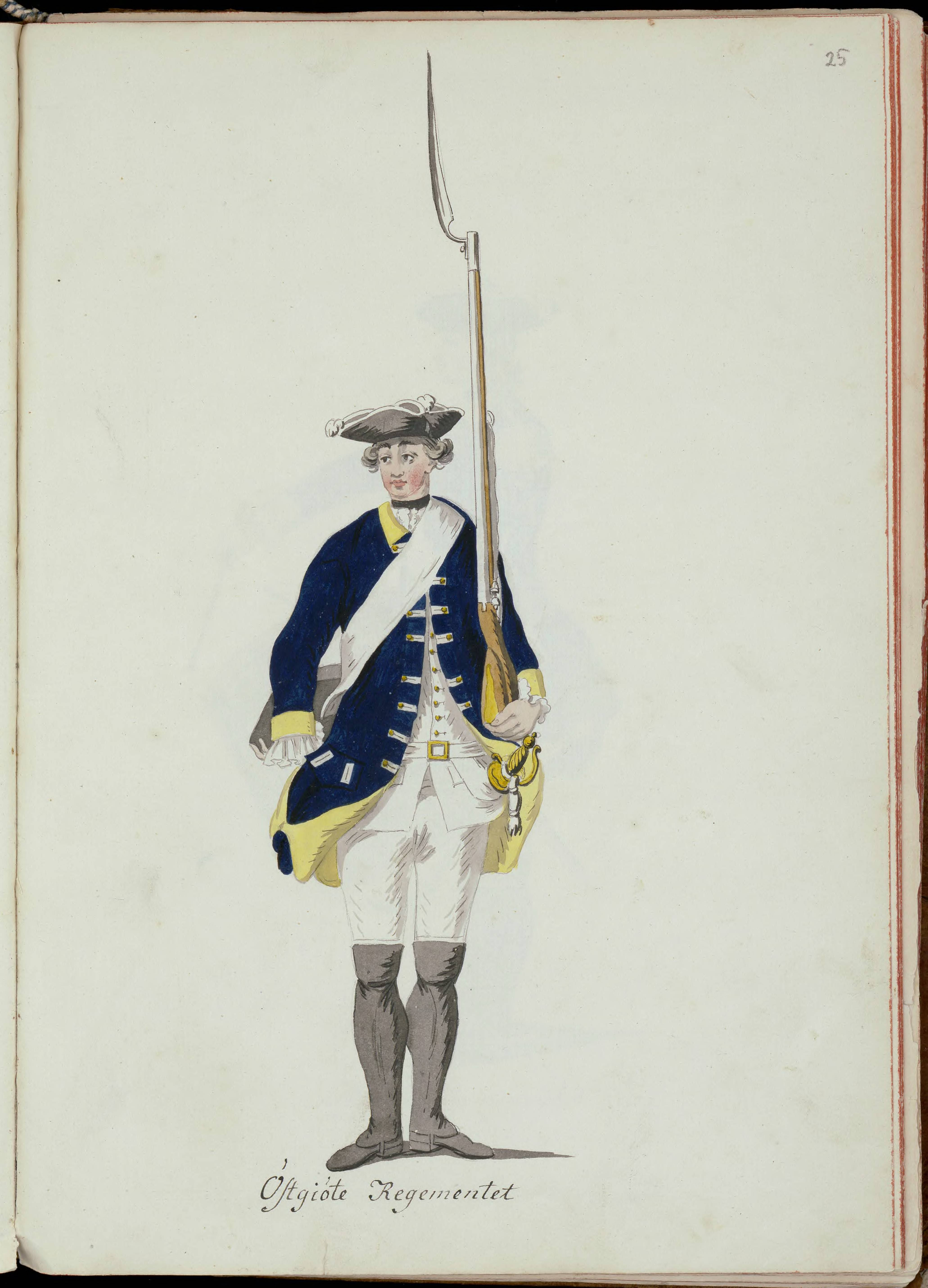
Drawing of a musketman from the Östgöta Regiment, drawn in 1765

The Danes, approximately some 7,000 men, occupied a strong position on a defile, and the Swedish vanguard, led by Gustaf Banér, lacked knowledge of the area around them, thus trotting through the forest path unsuspectingly, was also far away from the infantry and artillery, which had difficulties traversing the poor roads. The Swedish situation was weak. On their left, the Swedes had the hills of Northern Kattarp, and to their right there were a few lakes, and between them there was a brook, making it impossible for the vanguard to form a line instead of the column they had been marching in. Seeing this, the Danish cavalry immediately attacked them at full speed, forcing the vanguard to withdraw.

Panicking, the advance guard, fleeing to the Swedish right wing, which consisted of the Adelsfana and the Uppland Regiment, failed to stop the vanguards retreat, leading to it also pulling with them the majority of the main Swedish force. Stenbock, seeing the situation, took command of both regiments and went to attack the cheering Danish cavalry in Gyldenløve’s regiment. However, it quickly became impossible to drive the Danes back, who believed in their victory. The Adelsfana and the Uppland regiment were repulsed after having lost several men and all of their standards. After their failure, Stenbock quickly regretted sending them to attack the Danes, in particular, the Adelsfana had performed very poorly and only stopped their retreat half a mile behind the battlefield.

Disaster for the Swedes was now imminent. The Danes assaulted the artillery that had been advancing behind the fleeing cavalry and captured several cannons. The infantry, marching behind the artillerymen, did not arrive quickly enough to help them. The Swedish cavalry on the left wing was also unable to help, as it was impossible for their horsemen to pass through the infantry on the small road, and it was so narrow that even two horsemen struggled to pass each other.

Stenbock kept his composure and sent four cannons and 200 men from the Östgöta Regiment under the command of Major Preuss up onto a hill near the defile. From the vantage point, the Swedish artillery and musket fire prevented the Danish cavalry from advancing and pursuing the fleeing Swedes. Frederick himself was supposedly in range of the Swedish musket fire at one point. Failing to charge the Swedish force on the hill right away, the Danes let Stenbock to send more infantry from the Södermanland Regiment and more cannons under Colonel Svinhufvud. At the same time, Lieutenant Colonel Påfvenfelt with more men from the Södermanland Regiment climbed another hill with some cannons and opened fire on the Danes.

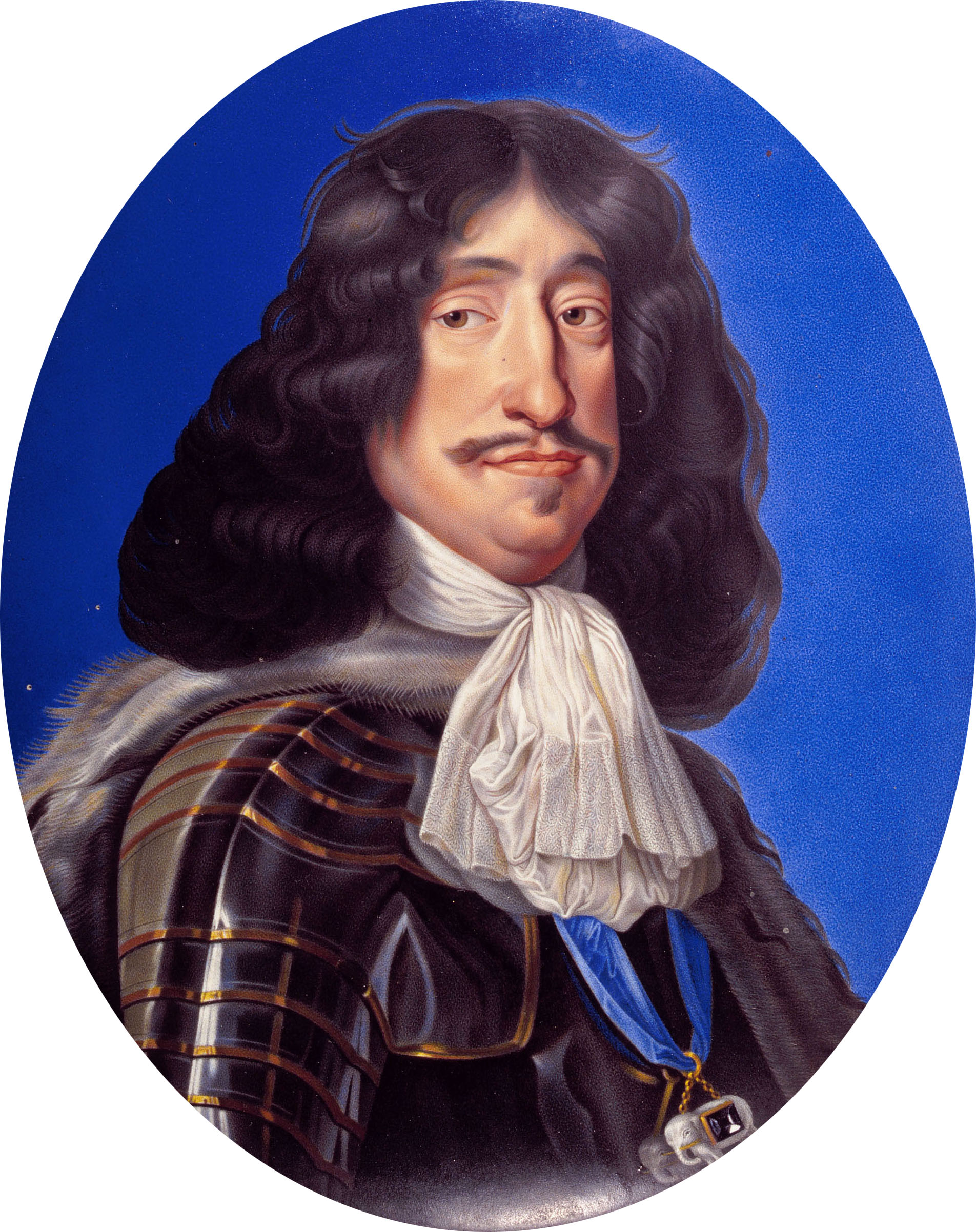
Portrait of King Frederick III by Paul Prieur

The fire from the Swedes became so intense that king Frederick ordered a retreat, it also became impossible for the Danes to organize into a battle line in the narrow passage. The fighting quickly turned into bloody man-on-man melee. The majority of the Swedish infantry and the left-wing cavalry had now also reached the battlefield and attacked the Danes, who became hard pressed. Frederick then realized he would not be able to win the battle, and withdrew to the main Danish force, which did not have the opportunity to intervene in the fighting.

== Aftermath ==
After the battle, Swedish losses amounted to some 68 killed, 63 wounded, and 43 captured according to a report. Stenbock was bitter that most of the people wounded had received injuries to their backs. The Danes, however, had slightly fewer losses, with barely 100 killed, wounded, or captured.

After the battle, Stenbock retreated into Småland, while Frederick continued northward to link up with Iver Krabbe, who was on his way south with the Norwegian army.

=== Result ===
The exact result of the battle is disputed among historians. Some consider it a Danish victory, while others consider it inconclusive. Claes-Göran Isacson also claims that the Danes had failed to defeat the Swedes, which had been the Danish King's goal.

== Works cited ==
- Essen, Michael Fredholm von (2023). Charles X's Wars: Volume 3 - The Danish Wars, 1657-1660. Helion & Company. ISBN 9781915113603.
- Sundberg, Ulf (2010). Sveriges krig 1630-1814 [Sweden's wars 1630–1814] (in Swedish). Svenskt militärhistoriskt bibliotek. ISBN 9789185789634.
- Isacson, Claes-Göran (2015). Karl X Gustavs krig: Fälttågen i Polen, Tyskland, Baltikum, Danmark och Sverige 1655-1660 [Wars of Charles X Gustav: The campaigns in Poland, Germany, the Baltics, Denmark and Sweden 1655-1660] (in Swedish). Historiska Media. ISBN 9789175450117.
