= Another Week =

Single by Eric Saade
- Released: 26 May 2017
- Genre: Pop
- Length: 3:39
- Label: Roxy Recordings
- Songwriter(s): Eric Saade; Andreas Moe; Andrew Bullimore; David Björk; Michael Kintish

Eric Saade singles chronology
"Wide Awake" (2016)	"Another Week" (2017)	"Så jävla fel" (2018)

"Another Week" is a song by Swedish recording artist Eric Saade. The song was released as a digital download on 27 May 2017 through Roxy Recordings. "Another Week" failed to chart in his home country, however, the remix of the song peaked at number 64 in Russia.

== Music video ==
A video to accompany the release of "Another Week" was first released onto YouTube on 20 August 2017. The video was directed by LMDL and produced by House of Wizards.

== Track listing ==
Digital download
No.	Title	Length
1.	"Another Week"	3:39

Digital download - Joakim Molitor Remix
No.	Title	Length
1.	"Another Week" (Joakim Molitor Remix)	2:48

Digital download - Aevion Remix
No.	Title	Length
1.	"Another Week" (Aevion Remix)	3:03

== Charts ==
Chart (2015)	Peak position
Russia (Tophit) (Joakim Molitor Remix)	64

== Release history ==
Region	Date	Format	Label	Ref.
Sweden	27 May 2017	Digital download	Roxy Recordings	
Sweden	14 July 2017	Digital download (Joakim Molitor Remix)	Roxy Recordings	
Sweden	18 August 2017	Digital download (Aevion Remix)	Roxy Recordings	
