= Go Girl =

Go Girl may refer to:

- "Go Girl" (Ciara song), 2008
- "Go Girl" (Pitbull song), 2007
- "Go Girl" (Summer Walker, Latto and Doja Cat song), 2025
- "Go Girl (Koi no Victory)", 2003 song by Morning Musume
- "Go Girl!", 2007 song by What's Up!

== See also ==
- Go Girls, a New Zealand television production
