= Det svarta fåret =

Studio album by Eric Saade
- Released: 12 June 2020
- Genre: Pop
- Length: 22:35
- Language: Swedish
- Label: Warner Music Sweden

Eric Saade chronology
Saade (2016)	Det svarta fåret (2020)

Singles from Det svarta fåret
- 1. "Så jävla fel" Released: 19 October 2018; 2. "Vill ha mer" Released: November 16, 2018; 3. "Skit för varandra" Released: 14 June 2019; 4. "Postcard" Released: 11 October 2019; 5. "Glas" Released: 3 April 2020; 6. "Nån som du" Released: 12 June 2020

Det svarta fåret (The Black Sheep) is the fifth studio album by Swedish singer Eric Saade. It was released on 12 June 2020 in Sweden through Warner Music Sweden. The album is Saade's first Swedish-language album in his career and his first studio album in approximately seven years, since Forgive Me (2013).

== Singles ==
After appearing in the eighth season of the Swedish reality television show Så mycket bättre in 2017, Saade released the lead single from the album, "Så jävla fel" on 19 October 2018, as the singer's first Swedish-language official single, following his promotional single "Du Är Aldrig Ensam" (2014). Saade performed the song at the Swedish morning television show, Nyhetsmorgon to promote the song.

The second single from the album, "Vill ha mer" was released on November 16, 2018. The song features guest vocals from a Swedish musician, Parham Pazooki. Scandipop called the song "a laidback r&b effort that pairs a soothing beat with an engaging pop melody".

"Skit för varandra" was released as the album's third single on 14 June 2019, with its accompanying lyrics video. Lyrically, the song is "a personal song about difficult relationships and the time after breakup". To promote the song, the singer sang the song at the Swedish morning television show, Nyhetsmorgon. On 3 August 2019, Saade performed the song at the Sommarkrysset 2019 in the Gröna Lund amusement park in Stockholm.

"Postcard" was released as the fourth single on 11 October 2019. The single became the most successful single from the album, peaking at number thirty-five in Sweden, and it was Saade's first appearance on the chart since "Sting" (2015) peaked at number five. The song features a Swedish singer Anis Don Demina as a guest vocalist. Saade and Demina performed the song at the fundraising television show, Musikhjälpen 2019 at the Stora torget in Västerås.

Saade released the fifth single from the album, "Glas" on 3 April 2020. However, Saade contracted the COVID-19 a week after the release, which made it difficult for him to promote the single. The accompanying music video was released on 17 April, which shows Saade dancing with the four backing dancers. About the song, Jonathan Currinn from CelebMix wrote, "Powerful throughout, the song itself is structurally strong, bringing an emotional upbeat backing track which has us feeling like it should be included in an emotional Disney film scene."

"Nån som du" was released as the sixth single on 12 June 2020 with the accompanying lyric video. Jonathan Vautrey from Wiwibloggs called "another mid-tempo track" and noted that "the single fits in well with the rest of the album's styling." Lyrically, the song deals with his separation from his long-term partner, Nicole Falciani.

== Track listing ==
Credits adapted from Spotify.

No.	Title	Writer(s)	Producer(s)	Length
1.	"Skit för varandra"	Eric Saade; Fredrik Sonefors; Jimmy Jansson	Jansson	3:28
2.	"Postcard" (with Anis don Demina)	Saade; Anis don Demina; Sebastian Atas; Victor Broberg; Victor Sjöström	Atas; Broberg; Sjöström	3:16
3.	"Månen/Solen"	Saade; Aron Bergerwall; Petter Tarland	A. Bergerwall	3:09
4.	"Nån som du"	Saade; Atas; Broberg; Sjöström	Atas; Broberg; Sjöström	3:13
5.	"Vill ha mer" (featuring Parham)	Saade; A. Bergerwall; Parham Pazooki; Tobias Bergerwall	A. Bergerwall; T. Bergerwall	3:11
6.	"Så jävla fel"	Saade; Aron WyMyel; T. Bergerwall; Thomas Stenström	WyMye	3:18
7.	"Glas"	Saade; Emelie Eriksson; Mattias Andréasson	Atas	3:05
Total length:				22:35

== Release history ==
Country	Date	Format	Label	Ref.
Sweden	12 June 2020	digital download	Warner Music Sweden	
