= Sleepless (Eric Saade song) =

Single by Eric Saade

from the album Masquerade
- Released: 21 December 2009
- Genre: Dance-pop: Europop
- Length: 3:21
- Label: Roxy Recordings
- Songwriters: Fredrik Kempe, Peter Boström

Eric Saade singles chronology
"Sleepless" (2009)	"Manboy" (2010)

Music video
- "Sleepless" on YouTube

"Sleepless" is a song performed by Swedish singer Eric Saade. It is the first single from Saade's first album, Masquerade, and was released on 21 December 2009 worldwide. It reached the top 50 in Sweden.

== Charts ==
Chart (2009)	Peak position
Swedish Singles Chart	44

== Release history ==
Country	Date	Format	Label
Worldwide	21 December 2009	CD single, digital download	Roxy Recordings
