= Zeana =

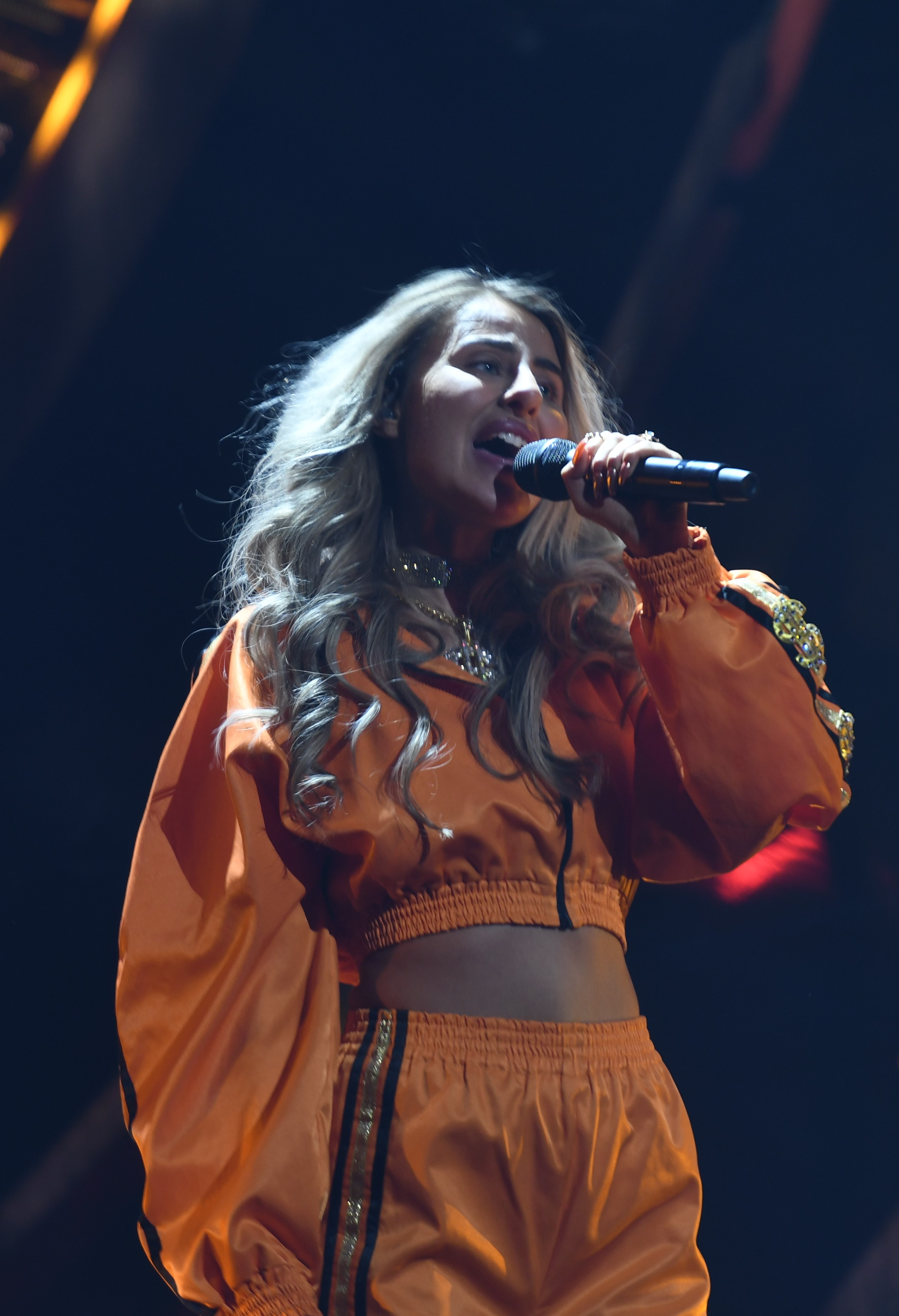
- Zeana in Melodifestivalen 2019

Background information
- Birth name: Zeana Muratovic
- Born: 5 November 1992 (age 32); Växjö, Sweden
- Genres: Pop, Rap
- Occupation: Singer
- Years active: 2016–present
- Labels: Warner Music Group

Zeana Muratovic, known simply as Zeana, (born 5 November 1992) is a Swedish singer. She participated in Idol 2016 which was broadcast on TV4, where she placed twelfth. Zeana participated in Melodifestivalen 2019 with the song "Mina bränder" along with Anis Don Demina. They took part in the first semi-final in Gothenburg on 2 February and placed fifth.

On 4 February 2019, the song "Mina bränder" entered the Spotify 200 chart at place 12.

== Singles ==
Title	Year	Peak chart positions	Album
Title	Year	SWE	Album
"Mina bränder" (featuring Anis don Demina)	2019	25	Non-album single
