= Vem e som oss =

Single by Anis Don Demina
- Released: 15 February 2020
- Length: 2:55
- Label: Warner
- Songwriter(s): Anderz Wrethov; Loui Maleoko; Johanna Elkesdotter Wrethov; Anis Don Demina; Robin Svensk
- Producer(s): Anderz Wrethov

Anis Don Demina singles chronology
"Postcard" (2019)	"Vem e som oss" (2020)	"1+1" (2020)

"Vem e som oss" is a song by Swedish singer Anis Don Demina. The song was performed for the first time in Melodifestivalen 2020, where it made it to the final through the Second Chance round. Demina finished in fifth place with the song, scoring 82 points. The song peaked at number 3 on the Swedish single chart.

== Charts ==
=== Weekly charts ===
Chart (2020)	Peak position
Sweden (Sverigetopplistan)	3

=== Year-end charts ===
Chart (2020)	Position
Sweden (Sverigetopplistan)	44

== Certifications ==
Region	Certification	Certified units/sales
Sweden (GLF)	Platinum	8,000,000^{†}
^{†} Streaming-only figures based on certification alone.
