= Break of Dawn (song) =

Single by Eric Saade

from the album Masquerade
- Released: 28 June 2010
- Genre: Pop
- Length: 3:31
- Label: Roxy Recordings
- Songwriters: Fredrik Kempe; Eric Saade

Eric Saade singles chronology
"Manboy" (2010)	"Break of Dawn" (2010)	"Popular" (2011)

"Break of Dawn" is a song performed by Swedish singer Eric Saade. It is the third single from Saade's first album, Masquerade, and was first released on 28 June 2010 in Sweden.

== Background ==
The song was written by Fredrik Kempe.

== Other versions ==
On 12 July 2010, a remix of the song by Le Family was released in Sweden.

== Charts ==
Chart (2010)	Peak position
Sweden (Sverigetopplistan)	45

== Release history ==
Country	Date	Format	Label
Sweden	28 June 2010	CD single, digital download	Roxy Recordings
Sweden (Le Family remix)	12 July 2010	CD single, digital download	Roxy Recordings
