= Elias Abbas =

Swedish singer (born 2001)

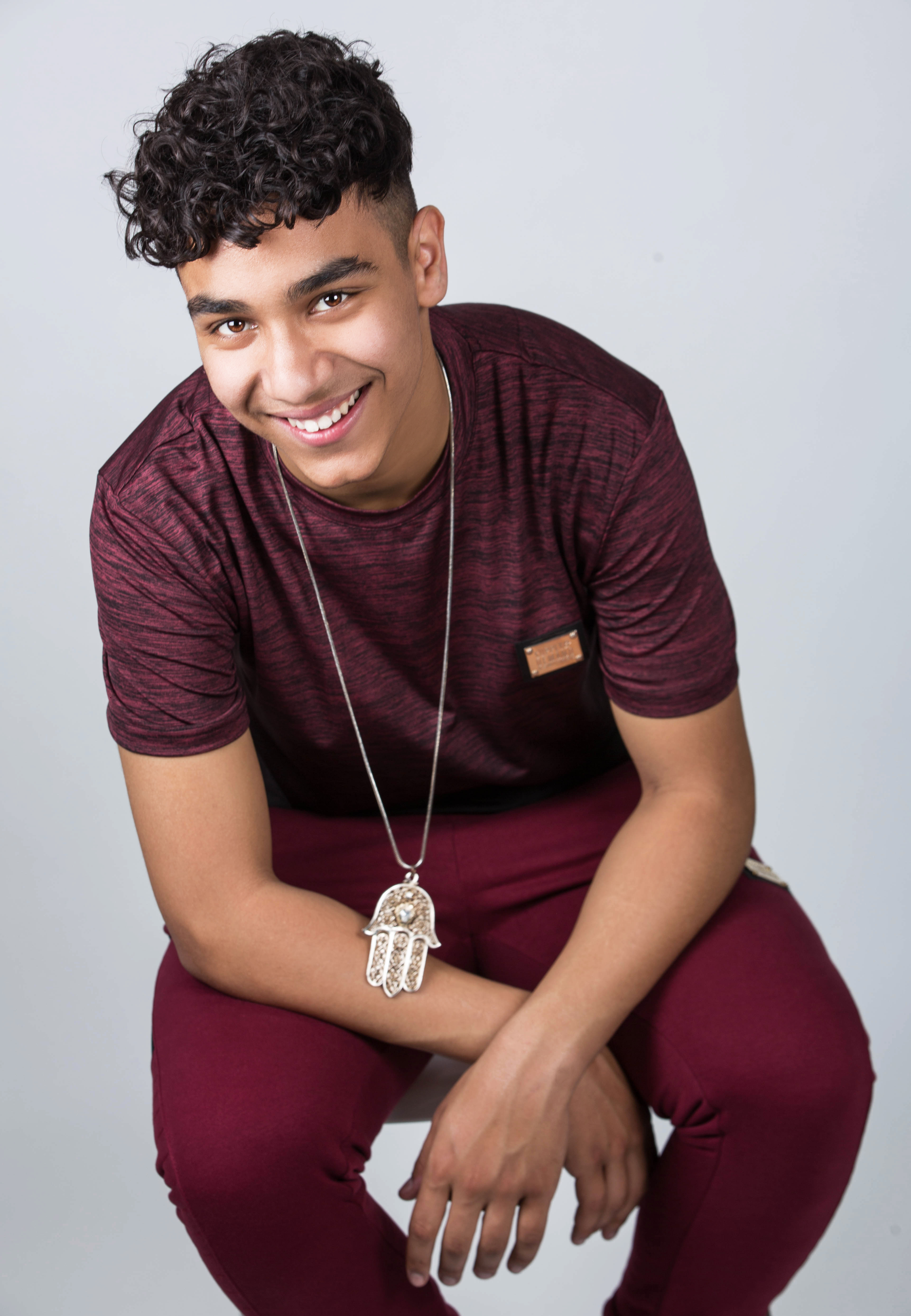
- Abbas in 2017

Background information
- Born: 1 December 2001 (age 24); Rinkeby, Sweden
- Genres: Pop
- Occupation: Singer
- Years active: 2017–present

Elias Abbas (born 1 December 2001) is a Swedish-Palestinian singer. Abbas participated in Melodifestivalen 2018 with the song "Mitt Paradis". In 2017, he released his debut single "Min Queen". In February 2019, he released a new single along with Anis Don Demina. Abbas also released the single "Problems", featuring Noad, in 2019. His first single of 2020 was "Big Time", featuring Stress and K27. His family is Palestinian and he is the brother of the Swedish rapper Amir Abbas.

== Discography ==
=== As lead artist ===
Title	Year	Peak chart positions	Album
Title	Year	SWE	Album
"Mitt Paradis"	2018	66	Non-album singles
"Problems" (featuring Naod)	2019	51	Non-album singles
"Big Time" (with Stress and K27)	2020	— (Note: "Big Time" did not enter the Swedish Singellista Chart, but peaked at number 15 on the Swedish Heatseeker Chart.)	Non-album singles

=== As featured artist ===
Title	Year	Peak chart positions	Album
Title	Year	SWE	Album
"Utanför" (Anis Don Demina featuring Sami and Elias Abbas)	2019	43	Non-album single
