= Saade (EP) =

EP by Eric Saade
- Released: 24 June 2016
- Genre: Pop
- Label: Roxy

Eric Saade chronology
Forgive Me (2013)	Saade (2016)	Det svarta fåret (2020)

Singles from Saade
- 1. "Colors" Released: 18 March 2016; 2. "Wide Awake" Released: 27 May 2016

Saade is the debut extended play by Swedish singer Eric Saade. It was released worldwide on 24 June 2016. The EP is considered a change in direction for Saade. In an interview with Expressen newspaper in May 2016, he said he "grew tired of his old sound" and decided not to continue with the album of pop songs. Saade promoted the EP by performing "Colors" and "Wide Awake" on Nyhetsmorgon.

== Reception ==
Scandipop said that Saade reinvented himself with this EP. They said that it was "largely a strong collection," and that "new songs "How Do You Like Me Now?" and "Heart of a Lion" stand up alongside "Colors" as sublime synthpop tracks with a cohesive sound and standard. They're so good as a trio though, that we can't help but feel the other two songs detract somewhat from what could have been a brilliant EP. "Wide Awake", while still good, is just in a world of its own and away from the rest, sonically speaking. While "Darkest Hour".. should never have made it out of the studio! We love the new artist he's become, and we want him to stick with this new direction."

== Track listing ==
Saade track listing
No.	Title	Length
1.	"How Do You Like Me Now?"	3:42
2.	"Wide Awake" (featuring Gustaf Norén)	3:20
3.	"Colors"	3:20
4.	"Darkest Hour"	2:29
5.	"Heart of a Lion"	3:09

== Release history ==
Release history and formats for Saade
Country	Date	Format	Label
Various	24 June 2016	digital download	Roxy Recordings
