= What's Up! =

Swedish boy band

- Origin: Sweden
- Genres: Pop; teen pop
- Years active: 2007–2010
- Labels: Plugged; Walt Disney
- Past members: Eric Saade; Robin Stjernberg; Ludde Keijser; Johan Yngvesson; Johannes Magnusson

What's Up! was a Swedish boy band formed in Sweden in 2007. The original line-up consisted of Eric Saade, Robin Stjernberg, Ludwig "Ludde" Keijser and Johan Yngvesson. After Saade left the band in 2009 to pursue his solo career, Johannes Magnusson joined the band.

The original members of the band were selected from the finalists of the music competition, Talangtävling. Their debut single "Go Girl!" reached number five in Sverigetopplistan, the official Swedish Singles Chart. Their debut studio album, In Pose was released in January, 2007, and managed to reach top 40 in Sweden. They have been inactive since the release of their standalone single, "Walk In Walk Out" (2010).

After departing from the group, Saade scored a success as a solo singer, earning three number one albums and winning Melodifestivalen 2011 with the song, "Popular", thus representing Sweden in Eurovision Song Contest 2011.

== Career ==
The original members of What's Up! were selected based on a competition called Talangtävling that attracted hundreds of applicants. 15 finalists competed in an event held at the Ericsson Globe and as a result the four original members were selected. They all had experience in earlier musical events. Eric Saade from Kattarp had won on the Swedish music contest Joker (now Popkorn). Robin Stjernberg from Hässleholm had been a winner in the Sommarchansen in Malmö in 2006, Ludwig "Ludde" Keijser from Enköping had competed in Lilla Melodifestivalen and Johan Yngvesson from Vetlanda had appeared in Super Trouper television series.

The newly formed band toured Sweden starting Spring 2008 and released an album entitled In Pose. It stayed one week in the Swedish Albums Chart at #40. They had two relatively successful singles from the album. "Go Girl!" in May 2007 that peaked at #5 in the Swedish Singles Chart and "If I Told You Once" in March 2008 reaching #16.

In addition, they sang the Swedish language version of the theme song of a Disney production entitled Camp Rock under the title "Här är jag" in Swedish. They also dubbed the voices of the various characters in Swedish version of the Disney's Camp Rock, also appearing on the promotional trailer prepared by the Disney Channel.

In early 2009, the band announced the departure of Eric Saade for a solo career. He was replaced by Johannes Magnusson from Gothenburg.

== Discography ==
=== Albums ===
Title	Album details	Peak chart positions
Title	Album details	SWE
In Pose	Released: January 8, 2007; Formats: CD, digital download; Label: Plugged	40

=== Singles ===
Title	Year	Peak chart positions	Album
Title	Year	SWE	Album
"Go Girl!"	2007	5	In Pose
"Här Är Jag" (with Vendela Palmgren)	2008	—	Från Oss alla till Er alla
"If I Told You Once"	2008	16	In Pose
"Walk In Walk Out"	2010	—	Non-album singles
