= Manboy =

Single by Eric Saade

from the album Masquerade
- Released: 28 March 2010
- Recorded: 2009
- Genre: Dance-pop
- Length: 2:57
- Label: Roxy Recordings
- Songwriter(s): Fredrik Kempe; Peter Boström

Eric Saade singles chronology
"Sleepless" (2009)	"Manboy" (2010)	"Break of Dawn" (2010)

Music video
- "Manboy" (Acoustic) on YouTube

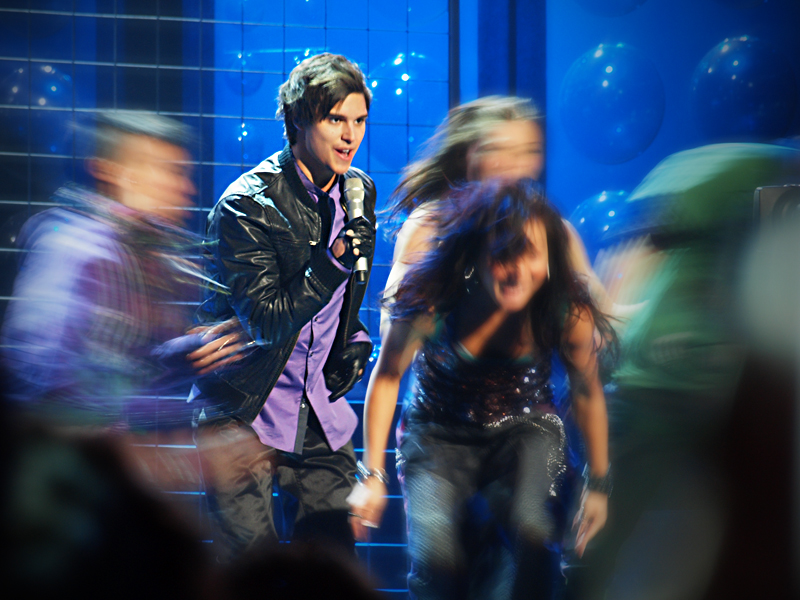
Eric Saade performing in Melodifestivalen 2010

"Manboy" is a song performed by Swedish singer Eric Saade. It is the second single from Saade's first album, Masquerade, and was first released on 28 March 2010 in Sweden.

== Background ==
The song was written by Fredrik Kempe and Peter Boström.

== Melodifestivalen 2010 ==
In 2010, Saade competed in Melodifestivalen with the song and reached third place.

== Other versions ==
- An acoustic version of the song was released on 10 May 2010 in Sweden.
- During a pause at Melodifestivalen 2013 the song was performed by Ann-Louise Hanson, Towa Carson and Siw Malmkvist as "Maj-Gull". It was also released on an EP the same year.
- In 2017, a cover version was released by Sabina Ddumba as a part of the eighth season of Så mycket bättre.

== Awards, nominations and certifications ==
The song was nominated for two Scandipop Awards 2011 in the categories Best Single from a New Artist and Best Male Single.

== Charts ==
Chart (2010)	Peak position
Sweden (Sverigetopplistan)	1

== Certifications ==
Certifications for Manboy
Region	Certification	Certified units/sales
Sweden (GLF)	Platinum	40,000^{‡}
^{‡} Sales+streaming figures based on certification alone.

== Release history ==
Country	Date	Format	Label
Sweden	28 March 2010	CD single, digital download	Roxy Recordings
Sweden (Acoustic version)	10 May 2010	CD single, digital download	Roxy Recordings
