= Popular (Eric Saade song) =

2011 song by Eric Saade

Single by Eric Saade

from the album Saade Vol. 1
- Released: 28 February 2011
- Recorded: 2010
- Genre: Eurodance, dance-pop
- Length: 3:00
- Label: Roxy Recordings, B1M1 Recordings, Mostiko, Ratas Music Group
- Songwriter: Fredrik Kempe
- Producer: Peter Boström

Eric Saade singles chronology
"Break of Dawn" (2010)	"Popular" (2011)	"Hearts in the Air" (2011)

Eurovision Song Contest 2011 entry
- Country: Sweden
- Artist: Eric Saade
- Language: English
- Composer: Fredrik Kempe
- Lyricist: Fredrik Kempe

Finals performance
- Semi-final result: 1st
- Semi-final points: 155
- Final result: 3rd
- Final points: 185

Entry chronology
- ◄ "This Is My Life" (2010)
- "Euphoria" (2012) ►

Music video
- "Popular" (Live at Melodifestivalen) on YouTube

"Popular" is an English language song written by Fredrik Kempe and performed by Swedish singer Eric Saade. It is the second single from Saade's second album Saade Vol. 1 and was the Swedish entry in Eurovision Song Contest 2011. It was first released on 28 February 2011 in Sweden and topped the Swedish Singles Chart. It has been covered by Elena Paparizou.

== Background ==
The song was written by Fredrik Kempe and produced by Peter Boström.

== Eurovision Song Contest ==
On 19 February 2011, Eric Saade competed in the third semi-final of Melodifestivalen 2011 with Popular. He won the final on 12 March 2011 with 193 points overall and was the Swedish entry for Eurovision Song Contest 2011.

During his performance, Saade had a glass box wall on stage that is supposed to break. In the first rehearsal, this did not work. Therefore, Sweden had an extra rehearsal in 2011. About the rehearsals in Eurovision Song Contest, Saade said: "It feels great after the first rehearsal. I just focused on all the important stuff, like cameras and angles. I'm gonna focus a little bit more on the singing and dancing part on the next rehearsal".

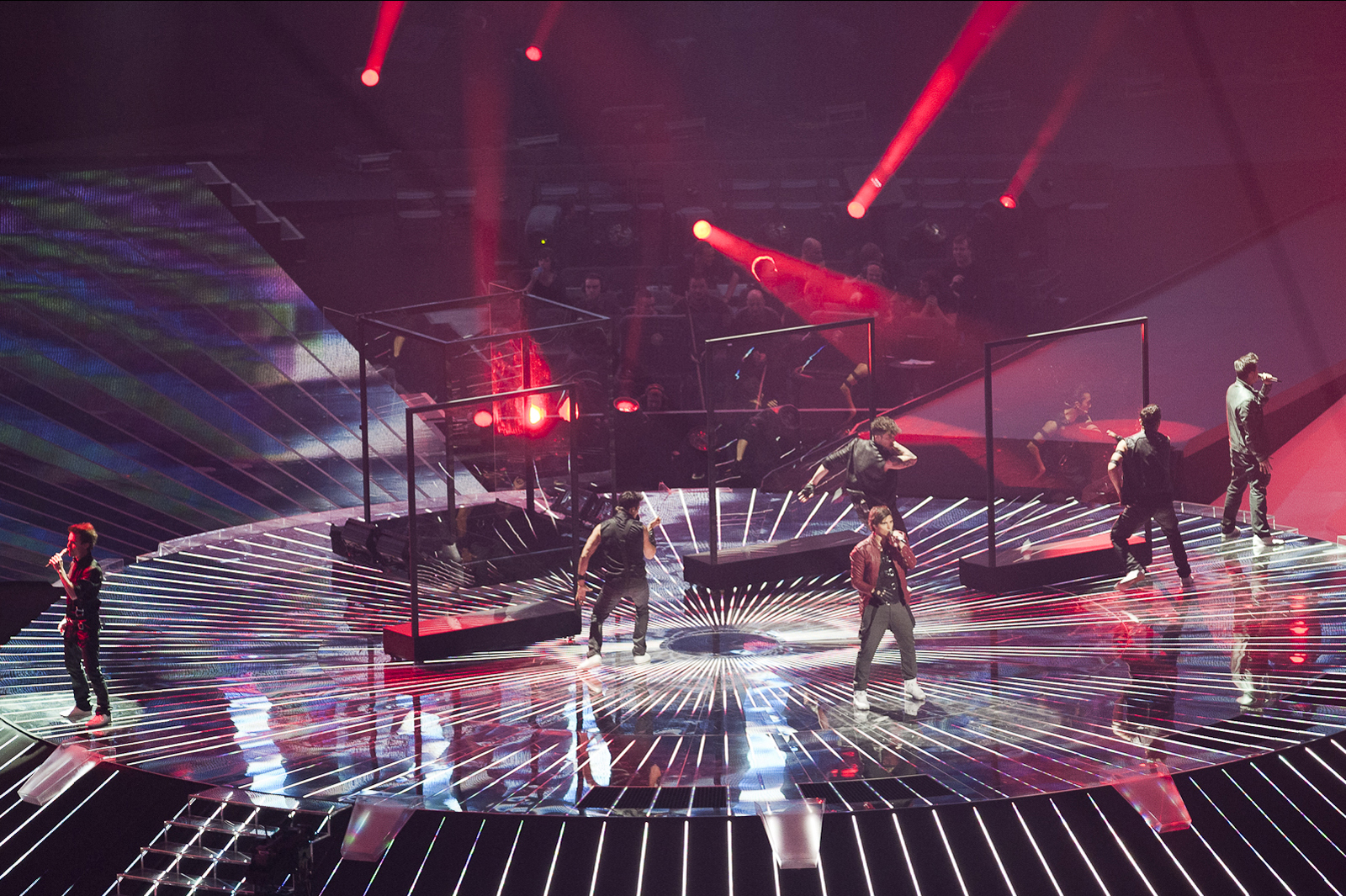
Eric Saade performing in the final of Eurovision Song Contest 2011

Saade performed on 12 May 2011 in the second semi-final of Eurovision Song Contest in eighth position in the lineup. Popular was the last song to have been announced to qualify for the Grand Final. It was later revealed that he finished first in the second semi-final. On 14 May 2011, he performed the song in the final in seventh position in the lineup. Saade came in third place with 185 points, which was the best result for Sweden since 1999 when Charlotte Perrelli won with the song Take Me to Your Heaven. It was also Sweden's fifth third place in Eurovision history. He came in second place in the televoting only two points behind the winner Azerbaijan.

== Other versions ==
- An album remix and a slow version of the song were released on 14 March 2011 in Sweden.
- On 25 May 2011, a remix by the SoundFactory was released in Sweden.
- In March 2012, Greek-Swedish singer Helena Paparizou sang her version of "Popular" during a pause in the final of the 2012 Melodifestivalen. Her performance was recorded and released as a single, her first in five years in Sweden.
- As a part of an interval act for Melodifestivalen 2013 the song was parodied by Ann-Louise Hanson, Towa Carson and Siw Malmkvist as "Pensionär". It was also released on an EP the same year.
- In the fall of 2017, Tomas Andersson Wij released a Swedish language cover version of the song titled "Den dag jag vinner allt" as a part of the eighth season of Så mycket bättre.

== Critical reception ==
In general, Popular received positive reviews from critics. Popjustice wrote that it is better than their entry for Eurovision Song Contest 2011 and that "this is just one of the songs that will make the United Kingdom look stupid at this year's Eurovision.“

== Awards, nominations and certifications ==
The song won the ESC Radio Award 2011 in the category Best Song and the Scandipop Award 2012 in the category Best Male Single. It was also nominated for a Rockbjörnen Award 2011 in the category Best Swedish Song and is nominated for a Grammi 2012 in the category Song of the Year. The SoundFactory Remix of the song was nominated for a Scandipop Award 2012 in the category Best Remix.

Popjustice.com has named the song Song of the Day. On 15 May 2011, the same website has named the slow version Song of the Day. In December 2011, the same website has listed the original song on number three of their list 45 Best Singles 2011.

As of July 2011, Popular has been sold over 40.000 times and received Double Platinum in Sweden.

== Music video ==
A censored version of the music video of the song was released on 14 April 2011. The music video includes a dance battle.

== Charts ==
=== Weekly charts ===
Chart (2011)	Peak position
Austria (Ö3 Austria Top 40)	29
Belgium (Ultratip Bubbling Under Flanders)	4
Belgium (Ultratip Bubbling Under Wallonia)	23
Finland (Suomen virallinen lista)	17
Germany (GfK)	48
Ireland (IRMA)	27
Sweden (Sverigetopplistan)	1
UK Singles (Official Charts)	76

=== Year-end charts ===
Chart (2011)	Position
Sweden (Sverigetopplistan)	16

== Certifications ==
Certifications for Popular
Region	Certification	Certified units/sales
Sweden (GLF)	2× Platinum	80,000^{‡}
^{‡} Sales+streaming figures based on certification alone.

== Release history ==
Country	Date	Format	Label
Sweden	28 February 2011	CD single, digital download	Roxy Recordings
Sweden (Album remix)	14 March 2011	CD single, digital download	Roxy Recordings
Sweden (Slow version)	14 March 2011	CD single, digital download	Roxy Recordings
Finland	25 April 2011	CD single, digital download	Ratas Music Group
Denmark	6 May 2011	CD single, digital download	Roxy Recordings
Norway	6 May 2011	CD single, digital download	Roxy Recordings
Australia	12 May 2011	CD single, digital download	Roxy Recordings
Canada	12 May 2011	CD single, digital download	Roxy Recordings
Italy	12 May 2011	CD single, digital download	Roxy Recordings
Japan	12 May 2011	CD single, digital download	Roxy Recordings
Lithuania	12 May 2011	CD single, digital download	Roxy Recordings
Mexico	12 May 2011	CD single, digital download	Roxy Recordings
Netherlands	12 May 2011	CD single, digital download	Roxy Recordings
Spain	12 May 2011	CD single, digital download	Roxy Recordings
United Kingdom	12 May 2011	CD single, digital download	Roxy Recordings
United States	12 May 2011	CD single, digital download	
Austria	18 May 2011	CD single, digital download	B1M1 Recordings
Germany	18 May 2011	CD single, digital download	B1M1 Recordings
Switzerland	18 May 2011	CD single, digital download	B1M1 Recordings
Belgium	20 May 2011	CD single, digital download	Mostiko
Sweden (SoundFactory remix)	25 May 2011		Roxy Recordings
