= Postcard (Eric Saade and Anis don Demina song) =

Single by Eric Saade and Anis don Demina

from the album Det svarta fåret
- Released: 11 October 2019
- Recorded: 2019
- Length: 3:15
- Label: Warner Music Sweden
- Songwriter(s): Anis don Demina; Eric Saade; Sebastian Atas; Victor Broberg; Victor Sjöstrom
- Producer(s): Sebastian Atas; Victor Broberg; Victor Sjöstrom

Eric Saade singles chronology
"Skit för varandra" (2019)	"Postcard" (2019)	"Glas" (2020)

Anis don Demina singles chronology
"Bryr mig inte" (2019)	"Postcard" (2019)	"Vem e som oss" (2020)

"Postcard" is a song by Swedish singer Eric Saade and Swedish DJ, singer, and musician Anis don Demina. The song was released as a digital download on 11 October 2019 through Giant Records. The song peaked at number 35 on the Swedish Singles Chart. The song was written by Anis don Demina, Eric Saade, Sebastian Atas, Victor Broberg and Victor Sjöstrom.

== Background ==
When Eric Saade and Anis don Demina met during the summer in Stockholm they discovered that both had the same experience and it was when the idea for the song was born. Saade said, "Anis reminds me a lot of when I was at the beginning of my career and his drive inspires! We may seem to be each other's opposites but have more similarities than many might think." Anis said, "This is a song that everyone who has been young and hopelessly dear for a summer can recognize themselves in. When Eric and I sat in the studio we just felt - this we have to release together."

== Music video ==
A video to accompany the release of "Postcard" was first released onto YouTube on 10 October 2019. The music video shows Eric Saade and Anis don Demina in Paris.

== Charts ==
Chart (2019)	Peak position
Sweden (Sverigetopplistan)	35

== Release history ==
Region	Date	Format	Label
Sweden	11 October 2019	Digital download; streaming	Warner Music Sweden
