= Fagerhult, Högsby Municipality =

Fagerhult
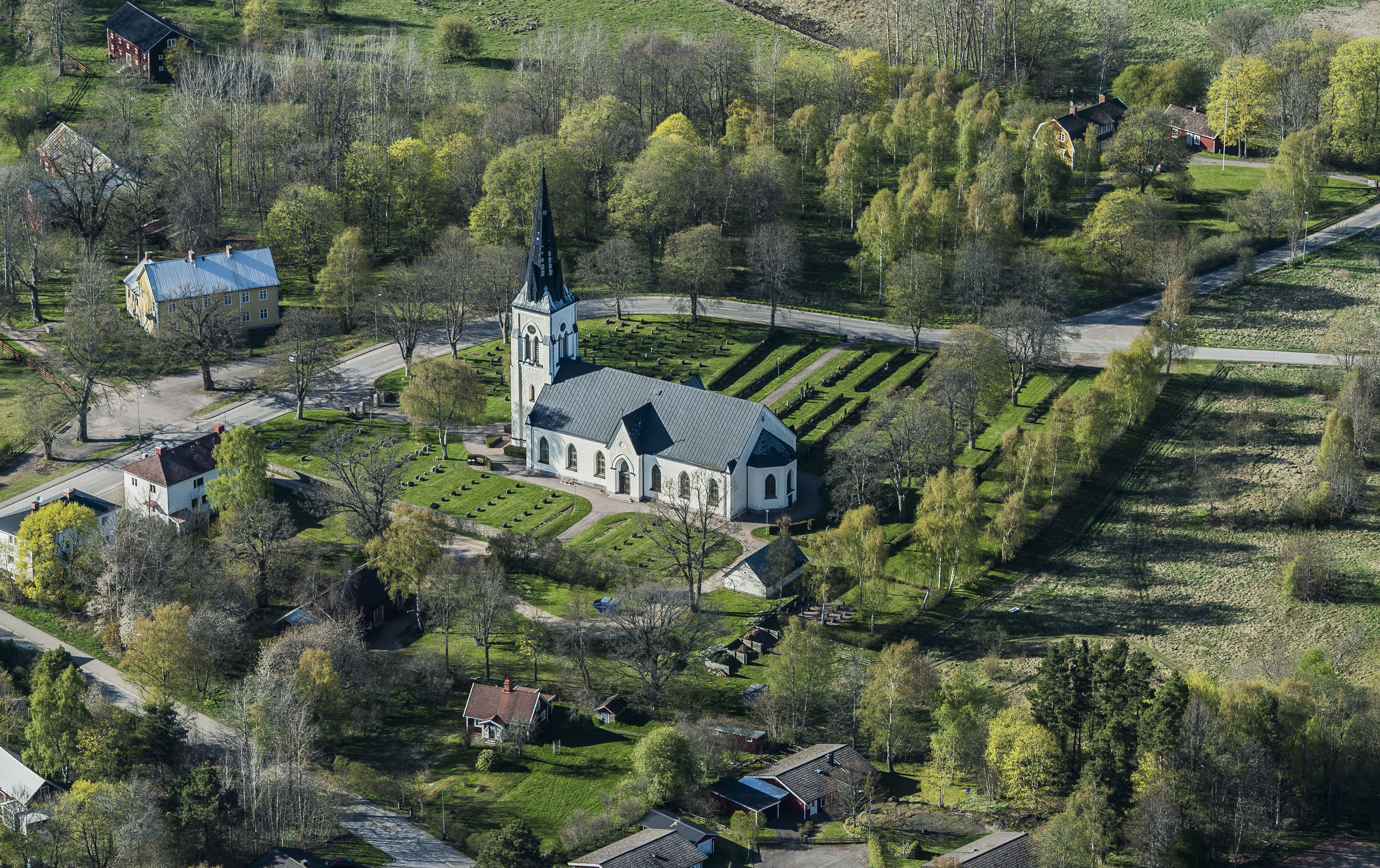

- Location within Kalmar Location within Sweden
- Coordinates: 57°09′N 15°40′E
- Country: Sweden
- Province: Småland
- County: Kalmar County
- Municipality: Högsby Municipality

Area
  - Total: 0.77 km^{2} (0.30 sq mi)

Population (31 December 2010)
  - Total: 229
  - Density: 296/km^{2} (770/sq mi)
- Time zone: UTC+1 (CET)
  - Summer (DST): UTC+2 (CEST)

Fagerhult is a locality situated in Högsby Municipality, Kalmar County, Sweden with 229 inhabitants in 2010.
