= Go Girl! =

Single by What's Up!

from the album In Pose
- Released: January 7, 2007
- Recorded: 2006
- Studio: World Studios
- Genre: Europop; electro-pop; pop
- Length: 2:55
- Label: Plugged Records; World Songs Sweden
- Songwriters: Danne Attlerud; Johan Bejerholm; Jonas Sahlin
- Producer: Jonas Sahlin

What's Up! singles chronology
"Go Girl!" (2007)	"Här Är Jag" (2008)

"Go Girl!" is the debut single by Swedish boy band, What's Up! from their debut album, In Pose. It was written by Danne Attlerud, Johan Bejerholm, and Jonas Sahlin and produced by Bejerholm and Sahlin. The song was released on January 7, 2007 through Plugged Records and World Songs Sweden. It reached number five on the Swedish Sverigetopplistan chart and became the country's 56th best-selling song of 2007.

== Track listing ==
- CD single / digital download
1. "Go Girl!" – 2:55
2. "Go Girl! (Karaoke Version)" – 2:54

== Charts ==
Charts (2007)	Peak position
Sweden (Sverigetopplistan)	5

== Release history ==
Country	Date	Format	Label	Ref.
Sweden	7 January 2007	CD single	Plugged Records; World Songs Sweden	
Sweden	7 January 2007	digital download	Plugged Records; World Songs Sweden	
