= En kväll i juni =

Single by Tre profiler
- A-side: "En kväll i juni"
- B-side: "Födelsedagskalaset"
- Released: 1971
- Songwriter(s): Lasse Berghagen

En kväll i juni ("An Evening in June"), also called "Han tog av sig sin kavaj" ("He Took Off His Blazer"), is a Swedish summer song written by Lasse Berghagen and is now one of Berghagen's most famous songs.

Berghagen wrote the song a midsummer evening in Svärdsjö in the end of the 1960s and recorded it first in 1970 but his disc was released first in 1975. The music group Tre Profiler recorded the song and released it as single in 1971 and finished on 10th place on Svensktoppen on 12 September 1971. Berghagen's version peaked at number 90 on Sweden's singles chart in 2021.

It´s about a little girl, his daughter Malin Berghagen, dancing with her grandpa.
