= Forgive Me (Eric Saade album) =

Studio album by Eric Saade
- Released: 28 August 2013
- Recorded: 2012–2013
- Genre: Pop; R&B
- Length: 52:38
- Label: Roxy
- Producer: Jason Gill; Espen Berg; Simen M Eriksrud; Ground Rules; Ronny Svendsen; Johan Kronlund; Stefan Örn; Element

Eric Saade chronology
Saade Vol. 2 (2011)	Forgive Me (2013)	Saade (2016)

Singles from Forgive Me
- 1. "Coming Home" Released: 24 April 2013; 2. "Forgive Me" Released: 15 August 2013; 3. "Flashy" Released: 23 August 2013; 4. "Boomerang" Released: 1 November 2013

Forgive Me is the fourth studio album by Swedish singer Eric Saade. It was released on 28 August 2013 in Sweden through Roxy Recordings. In Sweden, the album debuted and peaked at number one on the Sverigetopplistan, becoming his third consecutive number one studio album there, since Saade Vol. 1 (2011). The album also marked a commercial success in Scandinavian countries, reaching the top 40 in Finland, Norway and Denmark.

The album has spawned six singles and one promotional single, including the hit single "Coming Home", which has accumulated more than 2.3 million streams on Spotify as of June 2020. Upon its release, Forgive Me generally received mixed reviews from music critics.

== Background ==
Prior to this album, Saade had released three albums in the space of 18 months, and after almost a two-year break, he returned with Forgive Me, where he has co-written 12 of the 13 tracks.

== Singles ==
"Coming Home" was released on 24 April 2013, as the lead single from the album. To promote the single, Saade embarked on the tour entitled Coming Home Tour from 25 May 2012 to 14 September 2012. The accompanying music video, was released on 24 June 2013, and has accumulated more than 1.9 million views on YouTube. Saade performed the song at the several music festivals and television shows including Allsång på Skansen and Nyhetsmorgon. The single generally received favorable reviews, some of which mentioned to the song's similarity to Usher's work.

The second single from the album, "Forgive Me" was released on 15 August 2013, with the accompanying music video released on the same day. The song was initially released as a part of an extended play, Coming Home EP.

"Flashy" was released on 23 August 2013 as the album's third single. Saade is featured as the guest vocalist on the song, while the Norwegian musician A-Lee being the lead artist. The artists performed the song on several television shows, including the Norwegian morning show, God Morgen Norge, to promote the song.

Saade released "Boomerang" on 1 November 2013 as the fourth and the last single from Forgive Me. The accompanying lyric video was released on 9 November 2013.

=== Promotional single ===
On 24 October 2012, "Miss Unknown" and "Marching (In the Name of Love)" were released as the promotional singles, and the accompanying music videos were released on 7 December 2012 and 12 December 2012 respectively. Saade performed the singles on several television appearances, including Svenska idrottsgalan, Musikhjälpen, and X Factor. "Marching (In the Name of Love)" was also included on Saade's first compilation album Eric Saade: Deluxe, which was released exclusively in Norway.

"Winning Ground" was released as a promotional single on 5 June 2013. The song served as the official theme for the football tournament, UEFA Women's Euro 2013, which was held at the Friends Arena in Stockholm. The song was met with favorable reviews, praising the song's catchiness.

== Critical reception ==
Professional ratings
Review scores
Source	Rating
Wiwibloggs	2.5/5 stars
Scandipop	(positive)
VG	3/6 stars
Aftonbladet	(negative)

Forgive Me received generally mixed to negative reviews from music critics. Deban Aderemi from Wiwibloggs rated the album 2.5 out of 5 points, and called the album an "artistic failure" and "an endurance test", while admitting that the album was a commercial success and highlighting "Flashy" as "a great pop tune". Sandeep Singh of Verdens Gang gave the album 3 out of 6 stars, pointing out the lack of personality reflected on the album.

Scandipop provided a favorable review, stating ""Miss Unknown" and the title track "Forgive Me" stop the album from being a totally perfect record [but] other than that though, it's a fantastic album. Not what we expected. And not what we thought we wanted either. But it's an accomplished record that showcases an extraordinary amount of progression in his sound, yet still serves as an enjoyable listen from start to finish, for someone who has been an Eric Saade fan from Day 1."

== Track listing ==
Forgive Me track listing
No.	Title	Writer(s)	Producer(s)	Length
1.	"Till I Break"	Eric Saade; Jason Gill; Julimar Santos	Gill	5:01
2.	"Forgive Me"	Cato Sundberg; Saade; Espen Berg; Julimar Santos; Kent Sundberg; Simen M Eriksrud	Berg; Eriksrud	4:57
3.	"Coming Home"	Saade; Santos; Mats Lie Skåre	Gill	3:36
4.	"Cover Girl Part I"	Saade; Gill; Santos	Gill	4:15
5.	"Cover Girl Part II"	Saade; Gill; Santos	Gill	3:40
6.	"Flashy" (A-Lee featuring Eric Saade)	Ali Pirzad-Amoli; Bjarte Giske; Saade; Marcus Nilsen; Morten Pape	Ground Rules	3:05
7.	"In My Head"	Saade; Gill; Santos	Gill	3:31
8.	"We Are Beautiful"	Saade; Gill; Santos	Gill	4:37
9.	"Boomerang"	Saade; Gill; Santos	Gill	3:24
10.	"Marching (In The Name Of Love)"	Anne Judith Wik; Nermin Harambasic; Robin Jenssen; Ronny Svendsen	Svendsen	4:10
11.	"Stay"	Didrik Thott; Saade; Stefan Örn	Örn	3:58
12.	"Winning Ground" (Bonus track)	Thott; Saade; Santos; Örn	Kronlund; Örn	4:15
13.	"Miss Unknown" (Bonus track)	Saade; Hitesh Ceon; Santos; Kim Ofstad	Element	4:17
Total length:				52:38

== Personnel ==
Musicians

- Eric Saade - vocals
- Jason Gill – recording engineer, guitar, backing vocals, programming
- Beyond51 - recording engineer, keyboards, strings, additional vocals
- Ground Rules - recording engineer, programming, mixing
- Björn Engelmann - mastering
- Mats Lindfors - mastering
- Johan Kronlund - mixing, backing vocals
- Element - mixing
- Henrik Edenhed - mixing
- Anders Hvenare - mixing
- Anne Judith Wik - programming
- Nermin Harambasic - programming
- Julimar Santos - backing vocals
- Cato Sundberg - guitar
- Mattias Larsson - guitar, bass
- Espen Berg - keyboards, programming, mixing
- Simen M Eriksrud - keyboards, backing vocals, programming, mixing
- Henrique Verissimo Silva - backing vocals
- Sandra Bjurman - backing vocals
- A-Lee - vocals

Non-musicians

- Ricky Tillblad - design
- Mikael Jylhä - design
- Pia Börjlind - design
- Fredrik Etoall - photography

== Chart performance ==
=== Weekly charts ===
Chart (2013)	Peak position
Danish Albums (Hitlisten)	35
Finnish Albums (Suomen virallinen lista)	16
Norwegian Albums (VG-lista)	24
Swedish Albums (Sverigetopplistan)	1

=== Year-end charts ===
Chart (2013)	Position
Swedish Albums (Sverigetopplistan)	83

== Release history ==
Country	Date	Format	Label
Sweden	28 August 2013	CD; digital download	Roxy Recordings
