= Peter Boström =

Swedish songwriter and music producer

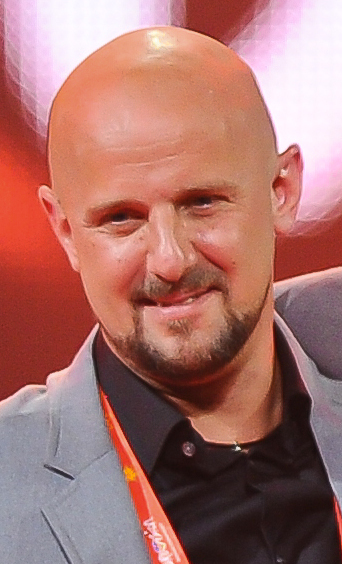
Boström in 2012

Peter Boström (born 19 May 1971) is a Swedish music producer and songwriter. He is also known as Bassflow.

Boström wrote his first song at the age of seven. In 1992, at the age of 21, he started Bassflow Productions, a production company near Stockholm, Sweden. As a producer, he worked with a number of well-known Swedish artists including Bosson, Basic Element, Petrus, E-Type, Ola Svensson, Martin Stenmarck, Carola, and Charlotte Perrelli. He also wrote a number of songs for Melodifestivalen performers. In 2008, he signed for peermusic Sweden.

Under the pseudonym Bassflow, Boström has made many radio-friendly productions and radio remixes for a number of songs amongst others: "Gloria" by Mando Diao, "What's the Point" by Johnossi and "Split My Personality" by Salem Al Fakir, in additions to songs by Pain, Martin Stenmarck, and the Norwegian group Donkeyboy (who got their breakthrough in Sweden with the Bassflow version of "Ambitions").

In 2012, he both won and lost the Eurovision Song Contest 2012, with a song he co-wrote for Swedish entry Loreen placing 1st with 372 points and a song he co-wrote for Norwegian entry Tooji placing last in the final with only 7 points.

== Discography ==
Boström has composed many successful songs. A selective list follows:

- "Thursdays" by Lovestoned
- "Disconnect Me" by Marie Serneholt
- "Headlines" by Alcazar
- "Manboy" and "Sleepless" by Eric Saade
- "In the Club" and "Amazing" by Danny Saucedo
- "Reminiscing" and "Tell Me" by Camilla Brinck
- "We Own the Universe" by Daze for Dansk Melodi Grand Prix 2013
- "Play it" by Xannova Xan for Greece in the Eurovision Song Contest 2025

He also co-wrote and produced seven Eurovision songs:

- "Popular"*, the Swedish entry in the Eurovision Song Contest 2011 by Eric Saade (3rd in the final with 185 points)
- "Euphoria", the Swedish entry in the Eurovision Song Contest 2012 by Loreen (winner with 372 points)
- "Stay", the Norwegian entry in the Eurovision Song Contest 2012 by Tooji (26th and last in the final with 7 points)
- "Amanecer", the Spanish entry in the Eurovision Song Contest 2015 by Edurne (21st in the final with 15 points)
- "Mon alliée (The Best in Me)", the French entry for the Eurovision Song Contest 2020 by Tom Leeb (contest got cancelled)
- "Tattoo", the Swedish entry in the Eurovision Song Contest 2023 by Loreen (winner with 583 points)
- "Esa diva (Benidorm Fest Edit)"*, the Spanish entry in the Eurovision Song Contest 2025 by Melody

"*" = song produced and not co-written by Boström
