= Anis Don Demina =

Swedish YouTuber and musician (born 1993)

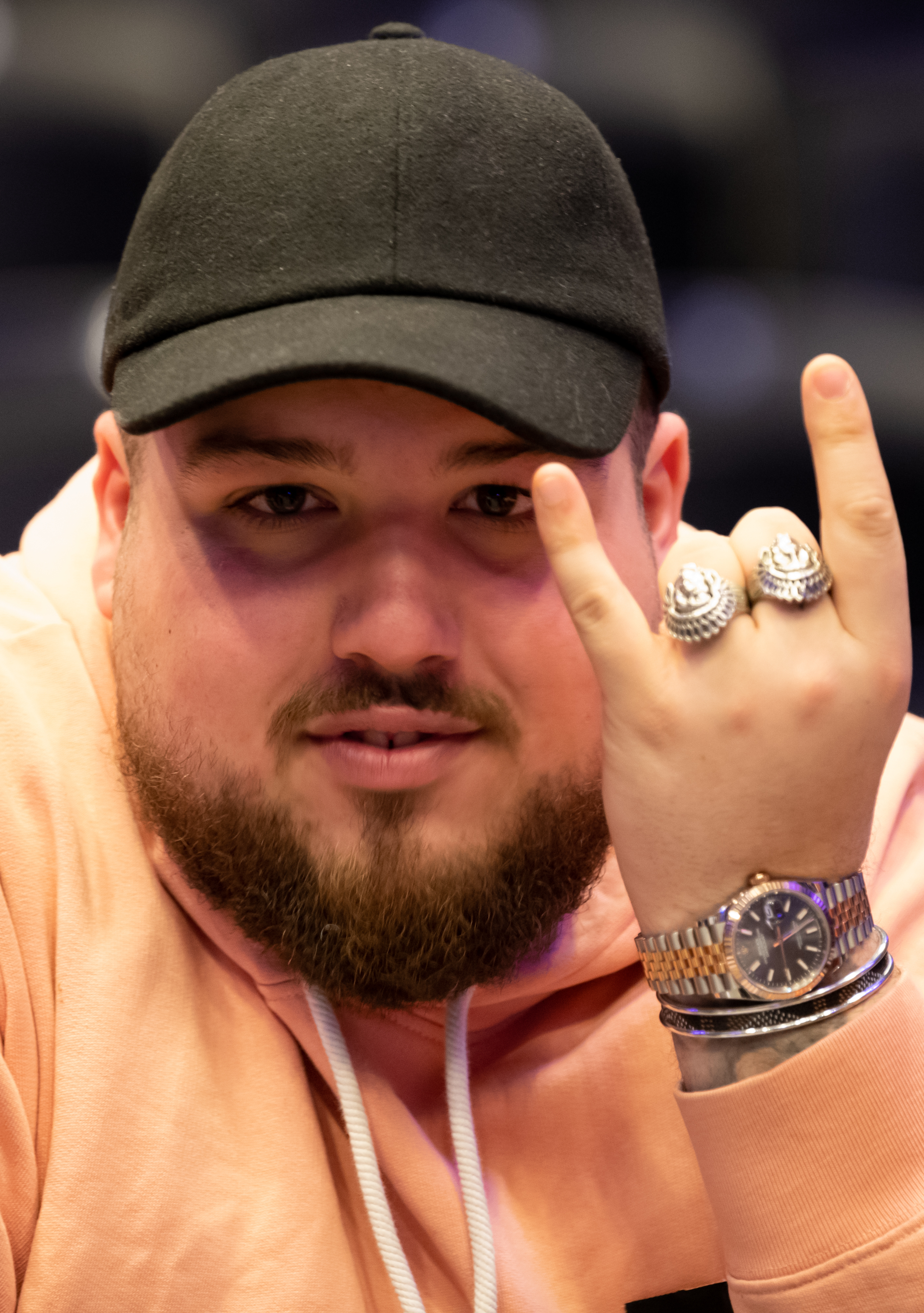
- Don Demina in 2020

Background information
- Born: Anis Dhahir; 25 April 1993 (age 33); Sundsvall, Sweden
- Genres: Pop; hip hop; house; EDM
- Occupations: YouTuber; media personality; rapper; songwriter; DJ; comedian
- Instrument: Vocals
- Years active: 2017–present
- Labels: Warner; Mega Recordings; Void Records; Deaf By Dawn; The Kennel; Universal Music; Atlantic Records UK; Amuseio AB

Anis Don Demina (Swedish pronunciation: [ˈâːnɪs]; born Anis Dhahir, 25 April 1993) is a Swedish media personality, YouTuber, rapper, DJ and comedian.

== Early life ==
His Iraqi father, an auto mechanic, fled from the Gulf War to Russia where he met Anis's Belarusian mother, a pianist and music historian. The couple went on their honeymoon to Sweden and decided to stay in Sundsvall, where Anis was born. When he was one year old, they moved to Jordbro, Stockholm, where he grew up with his parents, an older brother and an older sister. At 14 years old, Anis started performing as a rapper at children's clubs under the name "Sajjk".

== Career ==
=== 2017: Record deal ===
Demina has performed at clubs such as Movida in Dubai and Cirque Le Soir in London. In 2017, he signed a record deal with Warner Music and released his first single, "On My Mind", which received 1.5 million streams in its first month. In the summer of 2017, Demina went viral on YouTube after uploading a video criticizing Swedish YouTuber and musician Joakim Lundell.

=== 2018–present: Melodifestivalen and new singles ===
Demina participated in Melodifestivalen 2018, where he played the saxophone during Samir & Viktor's performance of their song "Shuffla", which finished fourth in the finale. He performed at the Peace & Love festival in 2018. In May 2018, his song "Wasted" (featuring Mad Kings) entered the Sverigetopplistan singles chart at number 33. He was also featured in "Put Your Hands Up för Sverige", a single by Samir & Viktor in support of the Swedish national football team for the 2018 FIFA World Cup. He participated in Melodifestivalen 2019, with the song "Mina bränder" along with singer Zeana. On 4 February 2019, the song entered at number 23 on the Spotify Top 200 chart in Sweden. He participated in the competition again in Melodifestivalen 2020 with the song "Vem e som oss", this time as a solo artist. Demina competed in the finale, which was held on 7 March 2020. He reached fifth place in the finale, scoring 82 points. On 20 March 2020, Demina release the single "1+1", featuring Råsa. The single debuted and peaked at number 96 on the Swedish Singles Chart. On 8 May 2020, Demina released the single "Naken", featuring Swedish musician Timbuktu. It peaked at number 39 on the Swedish Singles Chart.

Demina's YouTube channel has more than 125 million views and over 500 thousand subscribers.

== Discography ==
=== Extended plays ===
| Title | Details | Peak chart positions |
| Title | Details | SWE |
|---|---|---|
| Anis | Released: 28 June 2019; Label: Giant Records, Warner Music Sweden; Format: Digital download, streaming | 31 |
| "Artist" | Released: 26 June 2020; Label: Warner Music Sweden; Format: Digital download, streaming | — |
| Underbarn | Released: 11 June 2021; Label: Warner Music Sweden; Format: Digital download, streaming | — |
"—" denotes a recording that did not chart or was not released in that territory.

=== Singles ===
==== As lead artist ====
| Title | Year | Peak chart positions | Certification | Album |
| Title | Year | SWE | Certification | Album |
|---|---|---|---|---|
| "On My Mind" | 2017 | 66 | | Non-album singles |
| "Wasted" (featuring Mad Kings) | 2018 | 33 | | Non-album singles |
| "Sucker for Love" | 2018 | 47 | | Non-album singles |
| "Utanför" (featuring Sami and Elias Abbas) | 2019 | 43 | | Anis |
| "För stora för den här stan" (featuring Mapei) | 2019 | 39 | | Anis |
| "Bryr mig inte" (featuring Mapei) | 2019 | — (Note: "Bryr mig inte" did not enter the Swedish Singellista Chart, but peaked at number 11 on the Swedish Heatseeker Chart.) | | Anis |
| "Postcard" (with Eric Saade) | 2019 | 35 | | "Artist" |
| "Vem e som oss" | 2020 | 3 | GLF: Platinum | "Artist" |
| "1+1" (featuring Råsa) | 2020 | 96 | | "Artist" |
| "Naken" (featuring Timbuktu) | 2020 | 39 | | "Artist" |
| "Krossat glas" (featuring Nils Pontus) | 2020 | 91 | | "Artist" |
| "Stad i ljus" (featuring Oscar Zia) | 2021 | — (Note: "Stad i ljus" did not enter the Swedish Singles Chart, but peaked at number 16 on the Swedish Heatseeker chart.) | | Underbarn |
| "Flaggan i topp" (with Sami) | 2021 | 4 | GLF: Gold | Underbarn |
| "Så länge du ler" | 2021 | — | | Underbarn |
| "En kväll i juni" | 2021 | — | | Underbarn |
| "Pusselbitar" | 2024 | — (Note: "Pusselbitar" did not enter the Swedish Singellista Chart, but peaked at number two on the Swedish Heatseeker Chart.) | | Non-album singles |
| "Ramla" | 2025 | 46 | | Non-album singles |
| "Swish" | 2025 | — (Note: "Swish" did not enter the Swedish Singellista Chart, but peaked at number 20 on the Swedish Heatseeker Chart.) | | Non-album singles |
| "Superman" (featuring Pontus) | 2026 | 5 | | Non-album singles |
| "Spring!" | 2026 | 19 | | Non-album singles |
"—" denotes a recording that did not chart or was not released in that territory.

==== As featured artist ====
| Title | Year | Peak chart positions | Album |
| Title | Year | SWE | Album |
|---|---|---|---|
| "Put Your Hands Up för Sverige" (Samir & Viktor featuring Anis Don Demina) | 2018 | 4 | Non-album singles |
| "Mina bränder" (Zeana featuring Anis Don Demina) | 2019 | 25 | Non-album singles |
| "Svärmorsdröm" (Axel Schylström featuring Anis Don Demina) | 2019 | — | Non-album singles |
| "Portkod" (Samir Badran featuring Anis Don Demina and Nobel) | 2019 | — (Note: "Portkod" did not enter the Swedish Singles Chart, but peaked at number seven on the Swedish Heatseeker chart.) | Non-album singles |
| "Karlavagnen" (Herbert Munkhammar featuring Anis Don Demina) | 2020 | — | Non-album singles |
| "Flowers" (Nathan Dawe featuring Anis Don Demina) | 2020 | — | Non-album singles |
