= Kattarp =

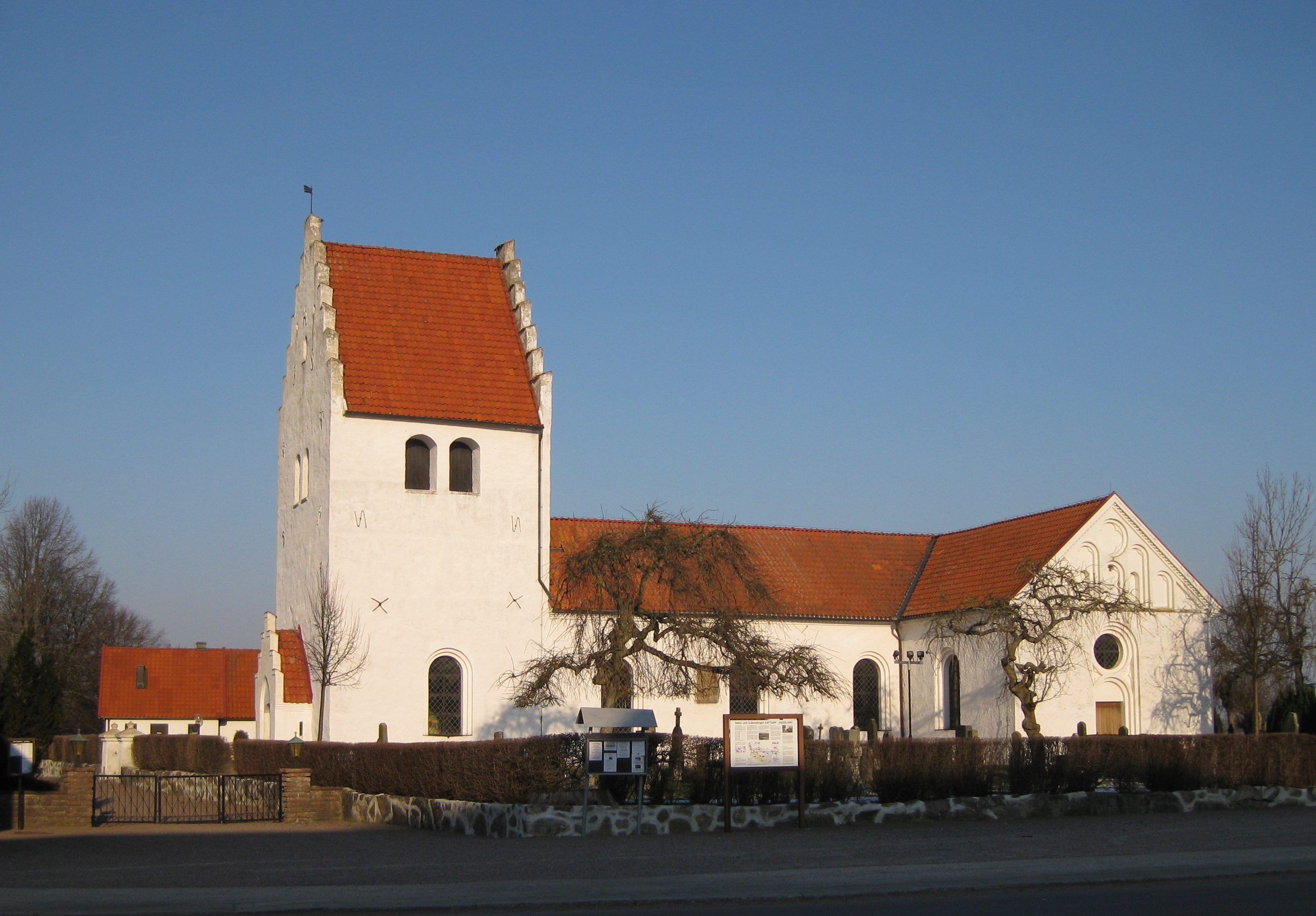
- Kattarp Church

- Location within Skåne Location within Sweden
- Coordinates: 56°08′N 12°47′E
- Country: Sweden
- Province: Skåne
- County: Skåne County
- Municipality: Helsingborg Municipality

Area
  - Total: 0.53 km^{2} (0.20 sq mi)

Population (31 December 2010)
  - Total: 688
  - Density: 1,308/km^{2} (3,390/sq mi)
- Time zone: UTC+1 (CET)
  - Summer (DST): UTC+2 (CEST)

Kattarp is a locality situated in Helsingborg Municipality, Skåne County, Sweden with a population of 688 inhabitants in 2010.

It is the birth place of singer Eric Saade.
