= Wide Awake (Eric Saade song) =

Single by Eric Saade featuring Gustaf Norén

from the album Saade (EP)
- Released: 27 May 2016
- Recorded: 2016
- Genre: Pop
- Length: 3:20
- Label: Roxy Recordings
- Songwriters: Joakim Daniel Andrén, Gustaf Eric David Norén, Viktor Johannes Norén & Eric Saade

Eric Saade singles chronology
"Colors" (2016)	"Wide Awake" (2016)	"Another Week" (2017)

Music video
- "Wide Awake" on YouTube

"Wide Awake" is a song by Swedish singer Eric Saade, featuring vocals from Swedish musician Gustaf Norén. The song was released as a digital download on 27 May 2016 through Roxy Recordings as the second single from his extended play Saade (2016).

A Filatov & Karas remix was released on 16 September 2016. The song has charted in Russia and Ukraine.

In 2017, Moneybrother released a cover version of the song as a part of the eighth season of Så mycket bättre.

== Music video ==
A video to accompany the release of "Wide Awake" was first released on YouTube on 26 June 2016 at a total length of three minutes and sixteen seconds.

== Track listing ==
Digital download – Single
No.	Title	Length
1.	"Wide Awake" (featuring Gustaf Norén)	3:20

Digital download – Remix
No.	Title	Length
1.	"Wide Awake" (featuring Gustaf Norén & Filatov & Karas) (Red Mix)	3:04

== Charts ==
Chart (2016–17)	Peak position
France (SNEP)	166
Russia (Tophit)	9
Ukraine (Tophit)	24

== Release history ==
Region	Date	Format	Label
Sweden	27 May 2016	Digital download	Roxy Recordings
