= Eric Saade =

Swedish singer (born 1990)

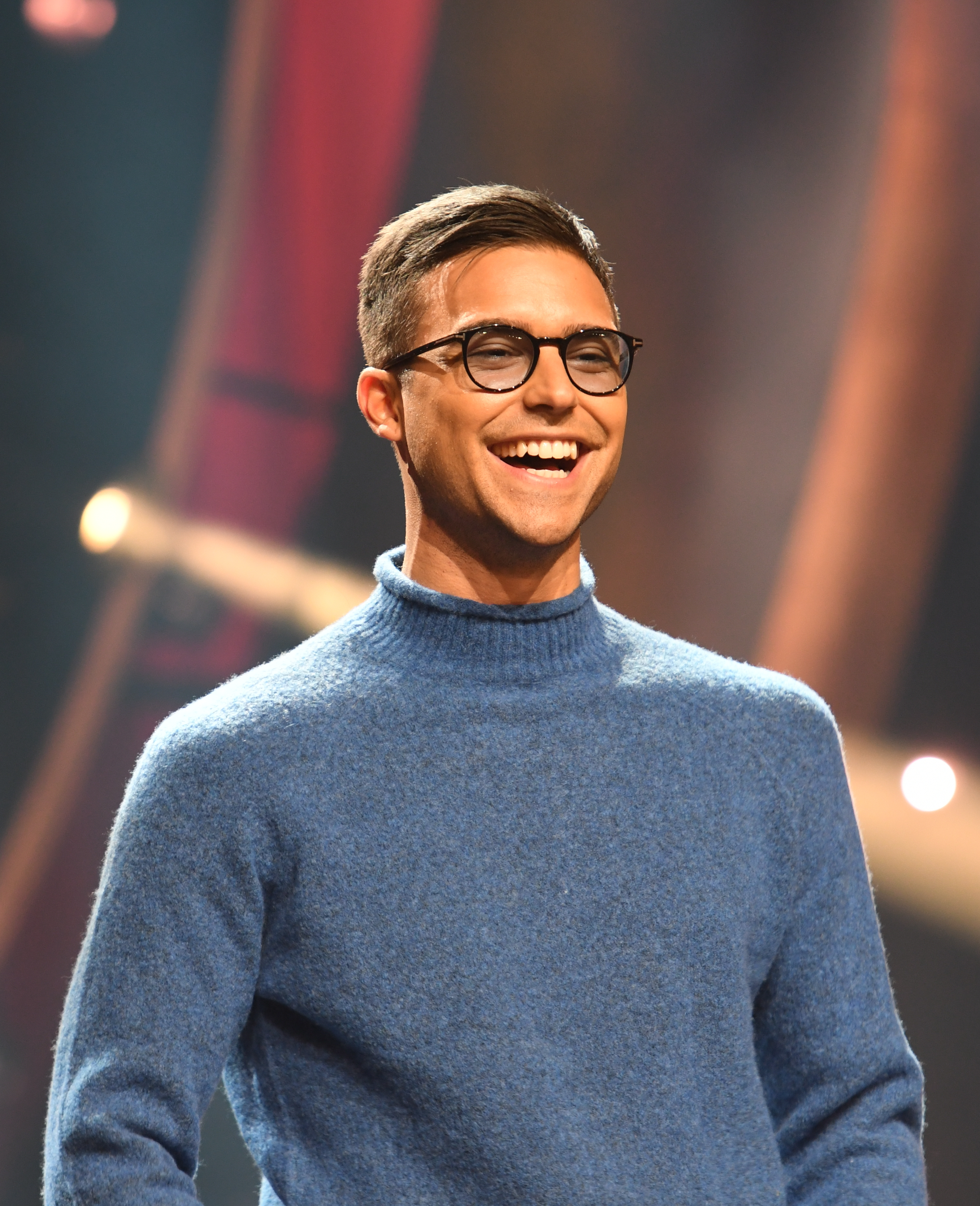
- Saade presenting Melodifestivalen 2019

Background information
- Born: Eric Khaled Saade; 29 October 1990 (age 35); Kattarp, Helsingborg, Sweden
- Genres: Pop; dance-pop
- Occupations: Singer; songwriter; television personality; model
- Years active: 2005–present
- Labels: Roxy Recordings; Warner Music Sweden
- Formerly of: What's Up!
- Partners: Molly Sandén (2007–2012); Nicole Falciani (2015–2020); Hanna Schönberg (2020–present)
- Website: www.ericsaade.com

Eric Khaled Saade (Note: Swedish pronunciation: [ˈêːrɪk saˈâːdɛ]; Arabic: إريك خالد سعادة, romanized: ʾĪrik Ḵālid Saʿāda, Lebanese Arabic pronunciation: [ˈʔeːrɪk ˈxæːlɪd saˈʕæːde].) (born 29 October 1990) is a Swedish singer-songwriter. He spent two years with the boy band What's Up!, leaving the band in February 2009 to pursue a solo career. Saade represented Sweden in the Eurovision Song Contest 2011 with the song "Popular", finishing in third place.

== Early life ==
Saade was born in Kattarp, a small village in Helsingborg Municipality, Scania, Sweden, to Marlene Jacobsson, a Swede, and Walid Saade, a Palestinian from Lebanon. After his parents divorced when he was four, he lived with his mother. Saade is the second of eight siblings and half-siblings.

Saade began singing after seeing Michael Jackson on television, and his other musical influences are Robbie Williams, Bryan Adams, the Backstreet Boys, and Justin Timberlake.

== Career ==
=== 2007: What's Up! ===
In 2007, Saade was a founding member of What's Up!, a Swedish boy band which included Robin Stjernberg, Ludwig "hejLudde" Keijser and Johan Yngvesson. Its members were picked from a competition attracting hundreds of applicants. Fifteen finalists (including Saade) competed at the Ericsson Globe, and the four winners became the band's founding members.

What's Up! began touring Sweden in the spring of 2008 and released an album, In Pose, which spent a week on the Swedish Albums Chart at #40. The album spawned two singles: "Go Girl!", released in May 2007, peaked at #5 on the Swedish Singles Chart and "If I Told You Once", released in March 2008, peaked at #16. The band recorded the Swedish version of the theme for Disney's Camp Rock ("Här är jag") and dubbed the characters' voices, appearing in the Disney Channel's Swedish trailer. When Saade left the band to pursue a solo career, he was replaced by Johannes Magnusson.

=== 2008–2009: Solo beginnings and Melodifestivalen debut ===
Saade's involvement in Camp Rock led to his hosting a show inspired by the movie; he also hosted the nationwide contest, Julia's Shooting Stars. In August 2009, Saade signed with the Swedish record label Roxy Recordings; in December he released his first solo single, "Sleepless", written by Fredrik Kempe and Peter Boström. Distributed on iTunes, the song peaked at #44 in Sweden. Anders Rune directed its music video, which premiered in January 2010.

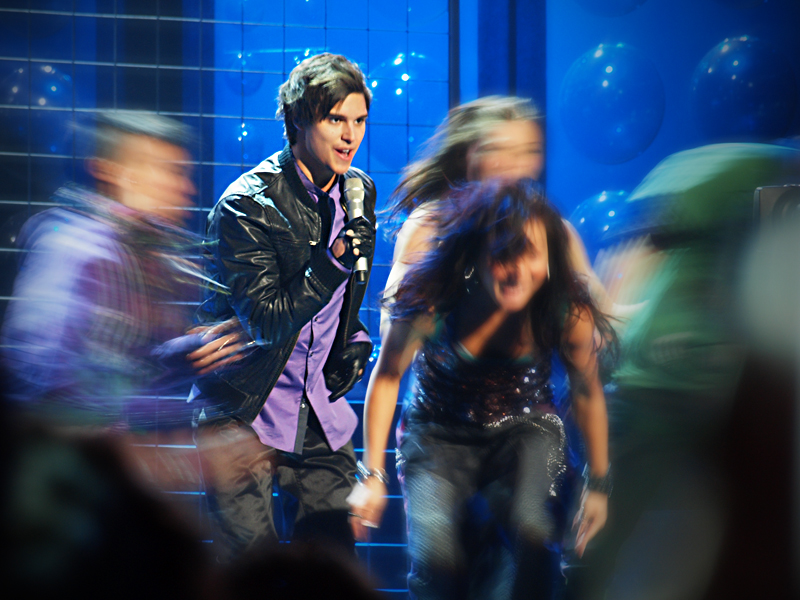
Saade at Melodifestivalen 2010

In February 2010, Saade sang "Manboy", written by Fredrik Kempe and Peter Boström, at the second semi-final of Melodifestivalen 2010 (the Swedish qualifier for the Eurovision Song Contest). He won the semifinal, finishing third overall. "Manboy" was released in March 2010 in Sweden, reaching #1 on the domestic-single and ringtone charts; its music video also premiered that month. The song's acoustic version was released in Sweden in May, and in June the single went platinum in that country.

=== 2010: Breakthrough in Sweden ===
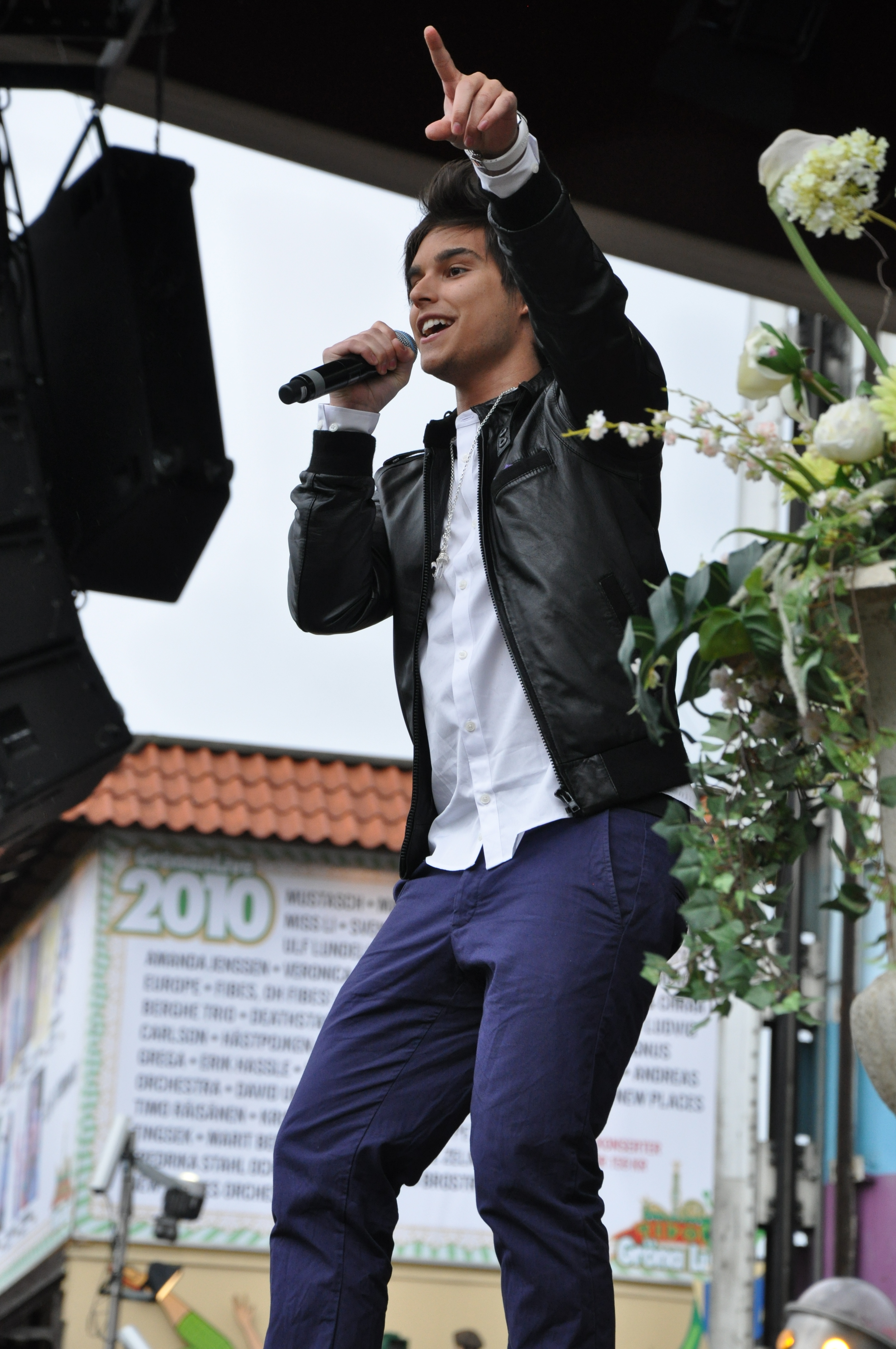
Saade on his Masquerade Tour

In January 2010, Saade won a Scandipop Award as the Brightest New Hope for 2010. In March he was nominated for a Marcel Bezençon Press Award for "Manboy", and won an Artistic Award. Saade released his first solo album, Masquerade, in May 2010. The album reached #2 in Sweden, and went gold. Saade began his first solo tour, known as the Masquerade Tour, playing 24 dates in Sweden from June to September 2010. Saade was Swedish spokesperson for the Eurovision Song Contest 2010.

The third single from Saade's debut album, "Break of Dawn" (written by Saade and Fredrik Kempe), was released in June 2010 and peaked at #45 on the Swedish charts. The song's music video also premiered that month. A remix, "Le Family Remix", was released in July.

In August 2010, Saade was nominated for three Rockbjörnen Awards: Best Swedish Male Live Artist, Best Breakthrough Act and Best Swedish Song of the Year (for "Manboy"). That year, Saade also released the singles "Masquerade" and "It's Gonna Rain". The music video for "Masquerade" premiered in August, and the video for "It's Gonna Rain" premiered in October.

=== 2011: Second Melodifestivalen attempt and Eurovision Song Contest ===
In February 2011, Saade entered the Melodifestivalen for a second time. This time he made the final, winning with "Popular" (written by Fredrik Kempe and produced by Peter Boström). The song's music video premiered in April.

In May 2011, Saade competed in the second semifinal of the Eurovision Song Contest 2011, advancing to the final. He finished third in the competition, Sweden's best placing since Charlotte Perrelli won in 1999 with "Take Me to Your Heaven". This was Sweden's fifth third-place finish at the Eurovision. "Popular" was released in Sweden in February 2011, reaching #1 on the Swedish charts. By July it sold over 40,000 copies in Sweden, reaching double platinum. Its music video premiered in April 2011, when the song was also released in Finland. The single was released in Norway on 6 May, in Australia, Greece, Ireland, Italy, Japan, Lithuania, Mexico, the Netherlands, New Zealand, Portugal, Spain, the UK and the US on 12 May, in Austria, Germany and Switzerland on 18 May and in Belgium on 20 May. "Popular" reached #4 in the Belgian (Flanders) Ultratip Charts, #17 in Finland, #23 in the Belgian (Wallonia) Ultratip, #29 in Austria, #27 in Ireland, #48 in Germany and #76 in the UK. The song was listed at #3 on PopJustice's list of 45 Best Singles of 2011. The album remix and slow versions of the song were released in Sweden in March 2011. The slow version was named Song of the Day by PopJustice on 15 May 2011, and the SoundFactory remix was released in Sweden on 25 May; another remix was released on 9 June in Greece.

==== Saade, Vols. 1 and 2 ====
In January 2011 Saade was nominated for six Scandipop Awards: Best Single from a New Artist and Best Male Single (for "It's Gonna Rain" and "Manboy"), Best Male Album (for Masquerade) and Best New Artist, winning Best Album from a New Artist and Best Male. That month, he was also nominated for a Song of the Year Grammis for "Manboy" and released the first single ("Still Loving It", co-written with Niclas Lundin and Anton Malmberg Hård Af Segerstad) from his second album.

Saade was nominated for a Marcel Bezençon Artistic Award (Melodifestivalen), and won a Press Award for "Popular". In April, he was nominated as Sweden's Favorite Star for a Nickelodeon Kids' Choice Award. In May, it was announced that Saade would release two new albums, Saade Vol. 1 and Saade Vol. 2. The first was released in Sweden and Norway in June. It topped the Swedish chart, selling 50,000 copies and certified platinum by July, and peaked at #16 in Finland. In June, Saade won two ESC Radio Awards for "Popular": Best Male Artist and Best Song.

The second single from Saade Vol. 1 ("Hearts in the Air", a duet with J-Son) and its music video was released in June in Sweden and Norway and September in France. It peaked at #2 in Sweden, and was certified gold. A remix of the song was released in December in the UK.

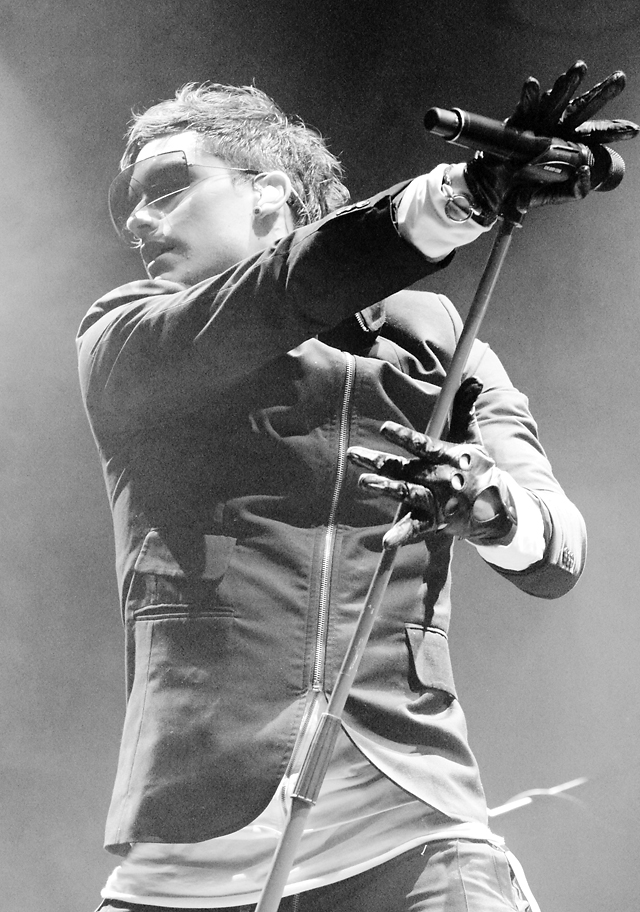
Saade performing at a Made of Pop Concert

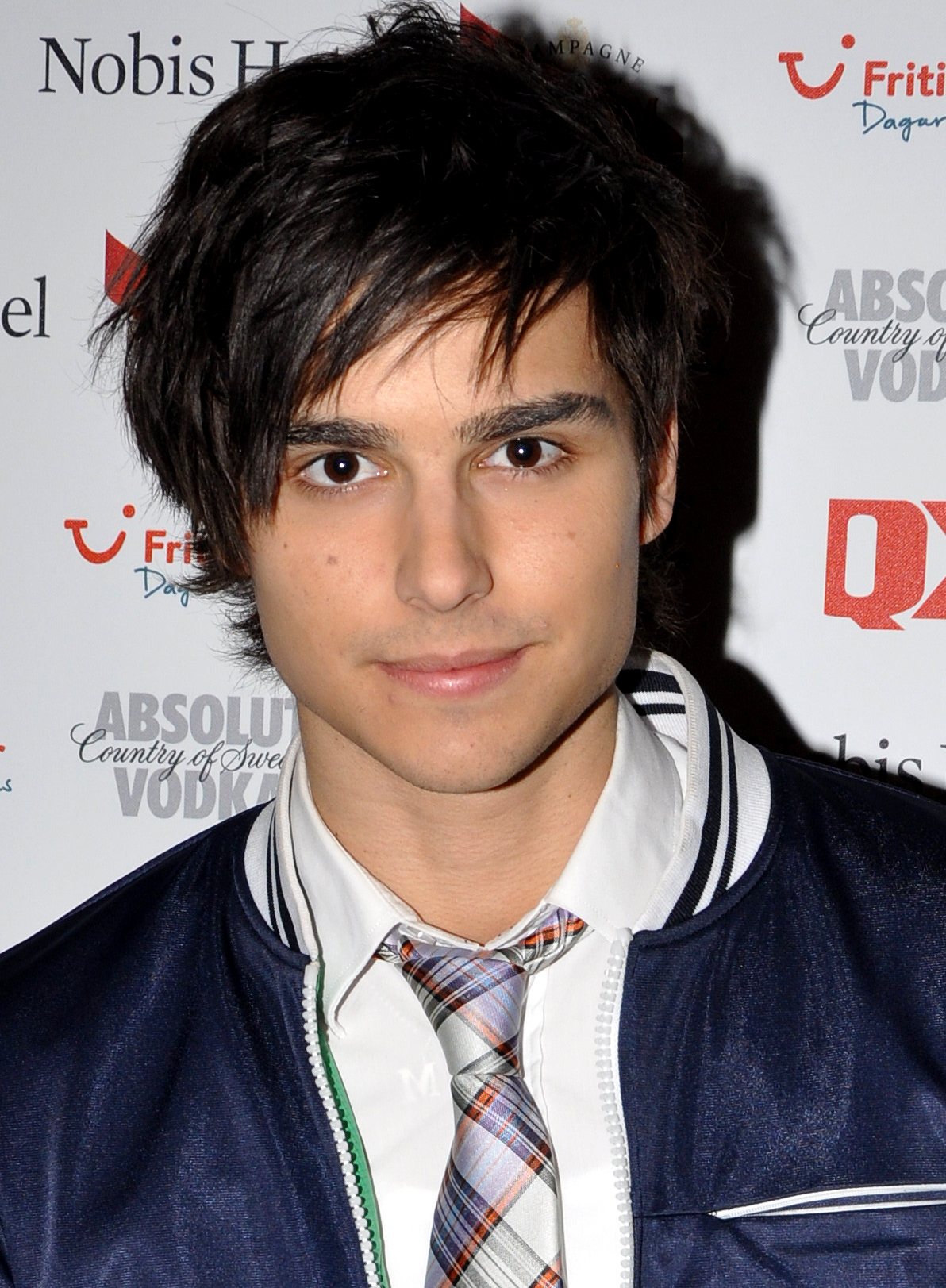
Saade in 2011

Saade toured again from June to November, calling his show the "Made of Pop Concert". The tour included 24 concerts in Sweden and one in France; on 14 July, he performed for the Swedish crown princess Victoria and the royal family.

In July, the singer was nominated for two You Choice Awards for "Popular": Best Male Video and Best Newcomer. That month, he was also nominated for two Rockbjörnen Awards: Best Male Artist Live and Best Swedish Song ("Popular").

In November 2011 Saade released the single "Hotter Than Fire", a duet with Dev co-written with Jason Gill and J-Son. The song reached #5 in Sweden; it was later remixed, with its music video released in December. Saade Vol. 2 was also released in November, reaching #1 in Sweden and #46 in Finland, and the singer was the most-searched Swedish celebrity on Google that year.

Saade Vol.1 & Saade Vol. 2 were both released in the United Kingdom on 9 June 2014. They became available in the UK iTunes store along with Saade's first studio album 'Masquerade'.

=== 2012: Forgive Me ===
Saade was nominated for six Scandipop Awards in 2012: Best Male, 2011 Readers' Favourite, Best Male Album (for Saade Vol. 1 and Saade Vol. 2), Best Male Single (for "Popular") and Best Remix (for "Popular [SoundFactory Remix]"), and was nominated for a Best Song Grammis for "Popular". In March and April Saade went on his third Swedish tour, "Pop Explosion Concert 2012", which included 15 concerts. In June, he released a new single with Norwegian singer Tone Damli entitled "Imagine"; its music video was released several weeks later.

The singer released two new singles in October: "Miss Unknown" and "Marching (In the Name of Love)", and said: "It has almost been a year without a new single. I've been writing a lot of new music, and want to include new influences. I've always loved RnB and Hip hop, and I want to mix it into my pop music. It might not be the most normal thing to release two singles at the same time, but I like to do things differently...and I love both songs equally!" A DVD of Saade's Pop Explosion Concert 2012 was released in November. The music video for "Marching (In the Name of Love)" was released on 7 December, and that for "Miss Unknown" was released on 12 December.

In April 2013 Eric announced his next album's title, Forgive Me, and released its first single ("Coming Home"). The song, co-written with J-Son and Mats Lie Skaare, was described by Saade's publicists as an urban-pop, summer song stylistically different (with the other songs on the album) from Saade's earlier work. He also said the album was influenced primarily by Justin Timberlake, Robbie Williams and Michael Jackson.

During the final of the Eurovision Song Contest 2013 in Malmö, Sweden, Saade was co-host in the "green room" (where finalists awaited results). While hosting, he said to co-host Petra Mede "Back to you, Petra. hashtag: MILF".

=== 2015–18: Melodifestivalen return, Saade EP and Så mycket bättre ===
Saade participated in Melodifestivalen 2015 with the song "Sting" in a bid to represent Sweden in the Eurovision Song Contest 2015 in Vienna, Austria. The song was co-written by Sam Arash Fahmi, Fredrik Kempe, Hamed "K-one" Pirouzpanah and David Kreuger. He performed the song live during the first semi-final round of Melodifestivalen on 7 February 2015 in Gothenburg's Scandinavium. Coming first that day, he qualified to the Finals on 14 March 2015 in Stockholm. In the final Saade placed fifth after the televoting and jury results was revealed. On 22 May 2015 Saade released his new single "Girl From Sweden".

Saade released his extended play Saade on 24 June 2016. Saade released the lead single from Saade titled "Colors" on 18 March 2016. On 27 May 2016 the title track "Wide Awake" featuring Gustaf Norén was released as the album's second single.

On 25 May 2017 Saade released his new single "Another Week". In late 2017, Saade participated in the eighth season of the reality TV-show Så mycket bättre. In December 2017, he released an EP called "Så mycket bättre 2017 – Tolkningarna" including 8 covered songs.

On 19 October 2018 Saade released a single "Så jävla fel". The single "Vill ha mer" featuring Parham was released on 16 November 2018.

=== 2019–present: Det svarta fåret and Melodifestivalen returns ===
On 26 October 2018, SVT announced that Saade would host all six shows of Melodifestivalen 2019 alongside Sarah Dawn Finer, Marika Carlsson and Kodjo Akolor. Saade was Swedish spokesperson again for the Eurovision Song Contest 2019.

On 14 June 2019, Saade released the single "Skit för varandra". Saade's fifth studio album, Det svarta fåret, was released in June 2020, which failed to enter any major charts. The album yielded a top-forty hit song, "Postcard", featuring Anis Don Demina.

In December 2020, it was announced that Saade would participate in Melodifestivalen 2021 with his first original English-language song in four years, "Every Minute". He qualified for the final, which was held on 13 March 2021 where he came in second place behind Tusse. On 5 March 2022, Saade appeared in the first heat of Melodifestivalen 2022 as an interval act, where he performed a medley of his Melodifestivalen entries to that point: "Manboy", "Popular", "Sting", and "Every Minute", and was inducted into Melodifestivalen's Hall of Fame.

He competed as a celebrity dancer in Let's Dance 2022, which is broadcast by TV4, and won the show. He is a member of Björnzone, a parody supergroup created for an interval act at Melodifestivalen 2024; the group has continued to release music since.

Saade was part of the opening act of the first semi-final of the Eurovision Song Contest 2024 in Malmö, in which he performed "Popular". Despite the EBU prohibiting the display of political symbols, Saade wore a black-and-white keffiyeh on his arm, which was seen as showing support for Palestinians during the Gaza humanitarian crisis. An EBU spokeswoman later stated: "All performers are made aware of the rules of the contest, and we regret that Eric Saade chose to compromise the non-political nature of the event". Saade has said in response: "I got that scarf from my dad as a little boy, to never forget where the family comes from. I didn't know then that it one day would be called a 'political symbol'. That's like calling the Dala horse a political symbol. To my eyes, it's nothing but racism. I just wanted to be inclusive and carry something that's real to me – but EBU seems to think that my ethnicity is controversial. That says nothing about me, but everything about them. I repeat this year's Eurovision Song Contest slogan: United by music".

== Personal life ==
Saade dated singer Molly Sandén from 2007 to 2012. In 2015, he began dating Swedish influencer Nicole Falciani. They became engaged in January 2019. In May 2020, they ended their relationship.

In 2020, Saade began dating Swedish fashion influencer Hanna Schönberg. Their son Zayn was born in July 2026.

== Discography ==
Studio albums

- Masquerade (2010)
- Saade Vol. 1 (2011)
- Saade Vol. 2 (2011)
- Forgive Me (2013)
- Det svarta fåret (2020)

== Tours ==
- Masquerade Tour (2010)
- Made of Pop Concert (2011)
- Pop Explosion Concert (2012)
- Coming Home Tour (2013)
- Stripped Live Tour (2015)

== Awards and nominations ==
Year	Award	Category	Work	Outcome	Notes
2010	Scandipop Awards	Brightest New Hope for 2010	Himself	Won	
2010	Marcel Bezençon Awards (Melodifestivalen)	Artistic Award	Manboy	Won	
2010	Marcel Bezençon Awards (Melodifestivalen)	Press Award	Manboy	Nominated	Lost to: Anna Bergendahl for This Is My Life
2010	Rockbjörnen Awards	Best Swedish Song of the Year	Manboy	Nominated	Lost to: Oskar Linnros for Från och med Du
2010	Rockbjörnen Awards	Best Breakthrough Act	Himself	Nominated	Lost to: Oskar Linnros
2010	Rockbjörnen Awards	Best Swedish Male Live Act	Himself	Nominated	Lost to: Lars Winnerbäck
2011	Scandipop Awards	Best New Artist	Himself	Nominated	Lost to: Gravitonas
2011	Scandipop Awards	Best Male	Himself	Won	
2011	Scandipop Awards	Best Album from a New Artist	Masquerade	Won	
2011	Scandipop Awards	Best Male Album	Masquerade	Nominated	Lost to: Darin for Lovekiller
2011	Scandipop Awards	Best Single from a New Artist	Manboy	Nominated	Lost to: Timoteij for Kom
2011	Scandipop Awards	Best Single from a New Artist	It's Gonna Rain	Nominated	Lost to: Timoteij for Kom
2011	Scandipop Awards	Best Male Single	It's Gonna Rain	Nominated	Lost to: Ola Svensson for All Over the World
2011	Scandipop Awards	Best Male Single	Manboy	Nominated	Lost to: Ola Svensson for All Over the World
2011	Grammis	Song of the Year	Manboy	Nominated	Lost to: Robyn for Dancing on My Own
2011	Marcel Bezençon Awards (Melodifestivalen)	Artistic Award	Popular	Nominated	Lost to: Danny Saucedo for In the Club
2011	Marcel Bezençon Awards (Melodifestivalen)	Press Award	Popular	Won	
2011	Nickelodeon Kids' Choice Awards (Sweden)	Sweden's Favorite Star	Himself	Nominated	Lost to: Amy Diamond
2011	Marcel Bezençon Awards	Artistic Award	Popular	Nominated	Lost to: Jedward for Lipstick
2011	Marcel Bezençon Awards	Press Award	Popular	Nominated	Lost to: Paradise Oskar for Da Da Dam
2011	ESC Radio Awards	Best Song	Popular	Won	
2011	ESC Radio Awards	Best Male Artist	Himself	Won	
2011	You Choice Awards	Best Male Video	Popular	Nominated	Lost to: Justin Bieber for Never Say Never
2011	You Choice Awards	Best Newcomer	Popular	Nominated	Lost to: Demi Lovato for Skyscraper
2011	Rockbjörnen Awards	Best Swedish Song	Popular	Nominated	Lost to: Veronica Maggio for Jag kommer
2011	Rockbjörnen Awards	Best Male Artist Live	Himself	Nominated	Lost to: Håkan Hellström
2012	Scandipop Awards	Reader's Favourite of 2011	Himself	Won	
2012	Scandipop Awards	Best Male	Himself	Won	
2012	Scandipop Awards	Best Remix	Popular (SoundFactory Remix)	Nominated	Lost to: Le Kid for Oh My God (SoundFactory Remix)
2012	Scandipop Awards	Best Male Album	Saade Vol. 2	Nominated	Lost to: Himself for Saade Vol. 1
2012	Scandipop Awards	Best Male Album	Saade Vol. 1	Won	
2012	Scandipop Awards	Best Male Single	Popular	Won	
2012	Grammis	Song of the Year	Popular	Nominated	Lost to: Avicii for Levels
2012	Nickelodeon Kids' Choice Awards (Sweden)	Sweden's Favorite Star	Himself	Won	
2012	Rockbjörnen Awards	Best Male Artist Live	Himself	Nominated	Lost to: Timbuktu
2012	Rockbjörnen Awards	Best Concert	Annexet	Nominated	Lost to: Bruce Springsteen for Ullevi
2012	Rockbjörnen Awards	Best Swedish Song	Hotter Than Fire	Nominated	Lost to: Loreen for Euphoria
2013	Scandipop Awards	Best Male Single	Marching (In the Name of Love)	Nominated	Lost to: Danny Saucedo for Amazing
2013	Scandipop Awards	Best Male	Himself	Nominated	Lost to: Danny Saucedo
2014	Scandipop Awards	Reader's Favourite Artist of the Year	Himself	Won	
2014	Scandipop Awards	Best Male Album	Himself	Won	Forgive Me
2014	Scandipop Awards	Best Male Singer	Himself	Won	

== Dubbing ==
Year	Film	Role	Notes
2007	Camp Rock	Shane Gray	Swedish voice-dub

== Notes ==
Awards and achievements
Preceded by Anna Bergendahl with "This Is My Life"	Sweden in the Eurovision Song Contest; 2011	Succeeded by Loreen with "Euphoria"
Preceded by (Australia) Gabriella Cilmi with "Sweet About Me" (2009)	Winner of Sopot Top Of The Top Festival; 2012	Succeeded by (France) Imany with "You Will Never Know"
Preceded by (Russia) Dmitry Shepelev	Eurovision Song Contest green room host 2013	Succeeded by (Denmark) Lise Rønne
