= Roxy Recordings =

Record label in Stockholm, Sweden

King Island Roxystars Recordings
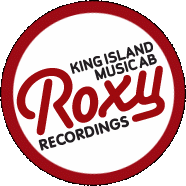
- Type: Subsidiary of the Playground Music
- Industry: Music & Entertainment
- Founded: 2006
- Headquarters: Stockholm, Sweden,
- Key people: Mårten Aglander CEO
- Parent: Universal Music Group (2011-2012); Egmont Group (2007-2011) Playground Music (2018- present)

King Island Roxystars Recordings AB, more known as Roxy Recordings, or Roxy is an independent record label based in Kungsholmen, Stockholm, Sweden where their office is the former site of Cheiron Studios and its successor The Location. It was bought by Universal Music Group in August 2011. The label was formed in 2007 and is owned by Playground Music Scandinavia . The label is mostly active on the Swedish market, but with former signed artists such as Agnes Carlsson and Erik Hassle, they have made an international leap. Agnes was the first one out, selling almost one million copies of her international hit single "Release Me" in 2009 and being released under Roxy's licence in 35 countries. Erik Hassle was successful with his hit "Hurtful" in among others, the UK. Victor Finke, also known under his stage name DEEVA, had a streaming hit with "Space Dance".

Universal put Roxy up for sale in September 2012; the founders bought the label becoming the owners. The label is now owned by Playground Music.

== Artists signed by Roxy Recordings ==
- Hooja
- Tjuvjakt
- Kasino
- Fanny Avonne
- Occrasy
- Morabeza Tobacco
- Wiktoria
- AKA Lisa

== Former signed artists ==
- Agnes Carlsson
- Erik Hassle
- Thomas Stenström
- Tjuvjakt
- Victor Crone
- Rymdpojken
- Eric Saade
- Amanda Fondell
- Anton Ewald
- Sebastian Karlsson
- Patrik Isaksson
- Peter Jöback
- Le Kid
- Lucia Pinéra
- Victor Finke (as DEEVA) (single: Space Dance)
- The Ark
- Sara Varga
- Janet Leon
- Eric Gadd
- Nicole Sabouné
- Fawni
- Crew of Me&You
- RABBII
- E.A. Lundquist
- Orup
- Finess
- Allysandra
- Fungz
- Pidde P
- Olle Grafström
- Lena Philipsson
- Malena Ernman
- Julia Bergwall
- Sarah Dawn Finer
- The Lovers of Valdaro (duo)

== See also ==
- List of record labels
