= DJ BoBo discography =

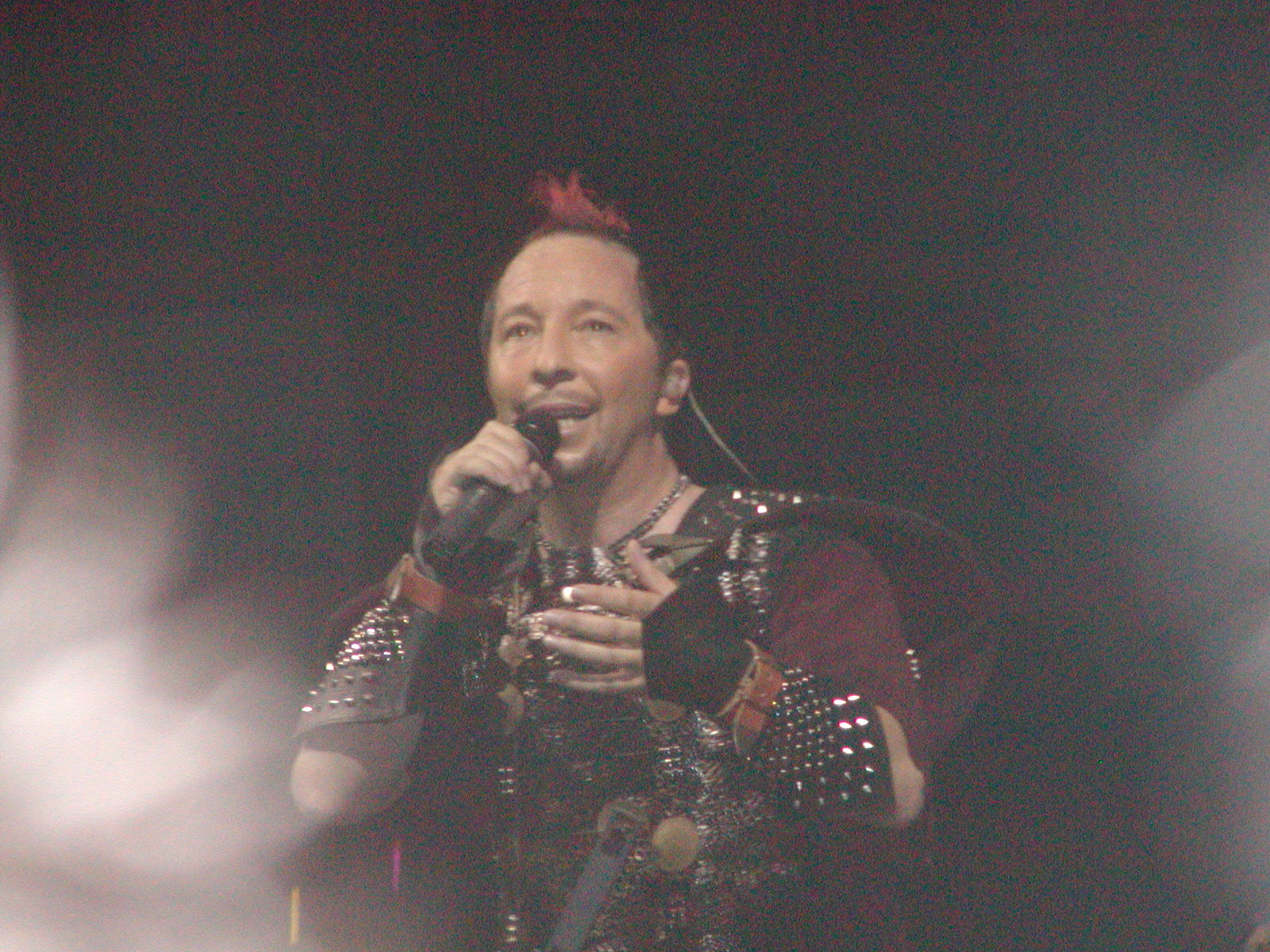
- DJ BoBo in 2005
- Studio albums: 16
- Live albums: 1
- Compilation albums: 9
- Singles: 44

Peter René Cipiriano Baumann (born 5 January 1968), better known as DJ BoBo, has sold 14 million records worldwide. He has released 16 studio albums, as well as a few compilation albums which have included his previous hits in a reworked format. DJ BoBo has released as many as 34 singles to date, some of which have charted quite high, not only in German speaking countries, but also in other European territories.

As a dance music producer, his first big success came with the single "Somebody Dance with Me", which borrows its melody from Rockwell's Somebody's Watching Me. After this, he charted well with the singles "Keep on Dancing", "Take Control", "Everybody", "Let the Dream Come True", "Love Is All Around", "Freedom", "Pray" and "What a Feeling", as well as "Chihuahua", almost all of which comprised fast-paced Eurodance techno sound with female catchy refrains and rap performed by René. Between 1992 through 2007, he had 27 single chart-hits in Switzerland and Germany, and has won 10 World Music Awards for being Switzerland's best selling artist. René has received numerous Gold and Platinum certifications for his singles and albums and has found success in Europe (primarily in Germany and Switzerland), Asia and South America.

== Albums ==
=== Studio albums ===
Title	Album details	Peak chart positions						Certifications
Title	Album details	SWI	AUT	FIN	GER	HUN	SWE	Certifications
Dance with Me	Released: 7 October 1993; Label: Fresh Music, Metrovynil (EAMS Lesser); Formats: CD, Cassette, LP, Digital download	4	16	6	18	12	15	
There Is a Party	Released: 21 October 1994; Label: Fresh Music, Metrovynil (EAMS Lesser); Formats: CD, Cassette, LP	4	17	6	9	—	41	SWI: Platinum; GER: Gold
World in Motion	Released: 30 September 1996; Label: Yes Music (EMI), Metrovynil (EAMS Lesser); Formats: CD, Cassette	1	2	9	3	1	—	POL: Gold; SWI: 2× Platinum; GER: Platinum
Magic	Released: 14 April 1998; Label: Yes Music (EMI), Metrovynil (EAMS Lesser); Formats: CD, Cassette, LP	1	8	—	5	9	—	SWI: Platinum; GER: Gold
Level 6	Released: 4 October 1999; Label: Yes Music (EMI), Metrovynil (EAMS Lesser); Formats: CD, Cassette, LP	1	24	—	11	10	—	SWI: Platinum; GER: Gold
Planet Colors	Released: 5 February 2001; Label: Yes Music (EMI), Metrovynil (EAMS Lesser); Formats: CD, Cassette	2	27	—	4	33	—	SWI: Platinum
Visions	Released: 24 February 2003; Label: Yes Music (TBA), Sony Music; Formats: CD, Cassette	3	—	—	11	—	—	SWI: Platinum
Pirates of Dance	Released: 31 January 2005; Label: Yes Music (Edel); Formats: CD, digital download	1	—	—	13	—	—	
Vampires	Released: 28 May 2007; Label: TBA, Warner; Formats: CD, digital download	2	74	—	15	—	—	SWI: Gold
Fantasy	Released: 26 February 2010; Label: TBA, Warner; Formats: CD, digital download	2	43	—	10	—	—	SWI: Gold
Dancing Las Vegas	Released: 25 November 2011; Label: Yes Music; Formats: CD, digital download	4	—	—	61	—	—	
Circus	Released: 10 January 2014; Label: Yes Music; Formats: CD, digital download	3	—	—	23	—	—	
Mystorial	Released: 23 September 2016; Label: Yes Music; Formats: CD, digital download	5	73	—	13	—	—	
Kaleidoluna	Released: 21 September 2018; Label: Yes Music; Formats: CD, LP, digital download	9	—	—	25	—	—	
Evolut30n	Released: 11 November 2022; Label: Yes Music; Formats: CD, LP, digital download	7	—	—	22	—	—	
Evolut30n	Released: 11 November 2022; Label: Yes Music; Formats: CD, LP, digital download	7	—	—	22	—	—	
The Great Adventure	Released: 16 January 2026; Label: Yes Music; Formats: CD, LP, digital download	10	—	—	27	—	—	
"—" denotes items that did not chart or were not released.

=== Compilation albums ===
Title	Album details	Peak chart positions					Certifications
Title	Album details	SWI	AUT	FIN	GER	HUN	Certifications
Just for You	Released: 6 October 1995; Label: Fresh Music, Metrovynil (EAMS Lesser); Formats: CD, Cassette, LP	5	26	28	25	7	SWI: Platinum
The Ultimate Megamix '99	Released: 22 March 1999; Label: Yes Music (TBA), Metrovynil (EAMS Lesser); Formats: CD, Cassette, LP	2	—	—	20	—	
Celebration	Released: 15 April 2002; Label: DJ Bobo Records (Sony Music); Formats: CD	2	18	—	4	35	
Chihuahua: The Album	Released: 27 June 2003; Label: Yes Music (TBA), Arista; Formats: CD	1	—	—	—	—	SWI: Platinum
Greatest Hits	Released: 17 March 2006; Label: Yes Music (TBA), Ministry O (Edel); Formats: CD, digital download	1	58	—	11	—	SWI: Gold
Olé Olé: The Party	Released: 2008; Label: Yes Music (Warner); Formats: CD, digital download	11	—	—	85	—	
Best Of	Released: 2014; Label: Yes Music (Warner); Formats: CD, digital download	52	—	—	—	—	
25 Years - Greatest Hits	Released: 2017; Label: Yes Music (Warner); Formats: CD, LP, digital download	11	—	—	40	—	
"—" denotes items that did not chart or were not released.

=== Remix albums ===
Title	Album details	Peak chart positions	
Title	Album details	SWI	GER
Reloaded	Released: 20 September 2013; Label: Yes Music (Warner Music); Formats: CD, digital download	6	53

=== Live album(s) ===
Title	Album details	Peak chart positions	
Title	Album details	SWI	GER
Live in Concert	Released: 8 September 2003; Label: DJ Bobo Records (Sony Music); Formats: CD	28	36

== Singles ==
Title	Year	Peak chart positions										Certifications	Album
Title	Year	SWI	AUS	AUT	BEL	FIN	FRA	GER	NDL	NOR	SWE	Certifications	Album
"I Love You"	1989	—	—	—	—	—	—	—	—	—	—		Non-album singles
"Ladies in the House"	1990	—	—	—	—	—	—	—	—	—	—		Non-album singles
"Let's Groove On"	1991	—	—	—	—	—	—	—	—	—	—		Dance with Me
"Somebody Dance with Me"	1992	1	13	3	32	5	—	4	3	3	1	AUS: Gold; AUT: Gold; GER: Gold; SWE: Gold	Dance with Me
"Keep on Dancing"	1993	2	54	7	—	1	—	5	9	9	7	GER: Gold	Dance with Me
"Take Control"	1993	4	—	9	—	—	—	12	18	—	21	GER: Gold	Dance with Me
"Everybody"	1994	3	85	24	35	1	—	2	12	—	20	GER: Platinum	Dance with Me
"Let the Dream Come True"	1994	1	49	6	19	1	—	4	11	—	11	GER: Gold	There Is a Party
"Love Is All Around"	1995	16	24	13	18	7	42	10	36	17	14	GER: Gold	There Is a Party
"There Is a Party"	1995	13	89	29	9	—	35	17	24	—	—	GER: Gold	There Is a Party
"Freedom"	1995	4	93	7	—	7	—	8	22	—	31	GER: Gold	There Is a Party
"Love Is the Price"	1996	11	—	13	—	12	—	11	—	—	—		Just for You
"Pray"	1996	2	—	6	15	2	-	3	—	—	—	GER: Gold	World in Motion
"Respect Yourself"	1996	16	—	23	—	7	—	31	—	—	—		World in Motion
"It's My Life"	1997	7	—	16	—	17	—	16	—	—	—		World in Motion
"Shadows of the Night"	1997	7	—	25	—	—	—	23	—	—	—		World in Motion
"Where Is Your Love"	1998	3	—	20	—	—	—	21	—	—	—		Magic
"Around the World"	1998	23	—	—	—	—	—	55	—	—	—		Magic
"Celebrate"	1998	8	—	—	—	—	—	48	—	—	—		The Ultimate Megamix 99
"Together"	1999	4	—	34	—	—	—	26	—	—	—		Level 6
"Lies"	1999	48	—	—	14	—	—	73	—	—	—		Level 6
"What a Feeling" (with Irene Cara)	2001	2	—	11	—	—	—	3	—	—	—		Planet Colors
"Hard to Say I'm Sorry"	2001	25	—	—	—	—	—	60	—	—	—		Planet Colors
"Way to your Heart"	2001	—	—	—	—	—	—	—	—	—	—		Planet Colors
"Colors of Life"	2001	37	—	—	—	—	—	75	—	—	—		Planet Colors
"Celebration"	2002	14	—	48	—	—	—	29	—	—	—		Celebration
"Chihuahua"	2002	1	73	48	8	12	1	19	41	15	10	SWI: Platinum; FRA: Diamond	Visions
"I Believe"	2003	13	—	61	—	—	—	18	—	—	—		Visions
"One Vision, One World"	2003	—	—	—	—	—	—	—	—	—	—		Visions
"Pirates of Dance"	2005	3	—	43	—	—	—	16	—	—	—		Pirates of Dance
"Amazing Life"	2005	27	—	—	—	—	—	48	—	—	—		Pirates of Dance
"Secrets of Love" (with Sandra)	2006	5	—	39	—	—	—	13	—	—	—		Greatest Hits
"Vampires Are Alive"	2007	3	—	62	—	7	—	24	—	—	—	SWI: Gold	Vampires
"We Gotta Hold On"	2007	24	—	—	—	—	—	—	—	—	—		Vampires
"Because of You"	2007	—	—	—	—	—	—	47	—	—	—		Vampires
"Olé Olé"	2008	12	—	—	—	—	—	58	—	—	—		Olé Olé
"Superstar"	2010	14	—	72	—	—	—	41	—	—	—		Fantasy
"This Is My Time"	2010	—	—	—	—	—	—	—	—	—	—		Fantasy
"Volare"	2011	—	—	—	—	—	—	—	—	—	—		Circus
"Everybody's Gonna Dance"	2011	72	—	—	—	—	—	70	—	—	—		Dancing Las Vegas
"La Vida Es (Una Flor)"	2012	—	—	—	—	—	—	81	—	—	—		Dancing Las Vegas
"Somebody Dance with Me (Remady 2013 Mix)" (feat. Manu-L)	2013	4	—	—	—	—	—	—	—	—	—		Reloaded
"Take Control (2013)" (with Mike Candys)	2013	6	—	60	—	—	—	67	—	—	—		Reloaded
"Everybody (2013)" (with Inna)	2013	60	—	—	—	—	—	—	—	—	—		Reloaded
"—" denotes a title that did not chart, or was not released in that territory.
