= Keep On Dancing! =

Single by DJ BoBo

from the album Dance with Me
- B-side: "Remix"
- Released: June 1993
- Genre: Eurodance
- Length: 3:33
- Label: Fresh; ZYX Music; Metrovynil; EAMS
- Songwriters: René Baumann; Daniel Peyer; Gutze Gautschi; Mark Wyss
- Producers: René Baumann; Gutze Gautschi; Mark Wyss

DJ BoBo singles chronology
| "Somebody Dance with Me" (1992) | "Keep On Dancing!" (1993) | "Take Control" (1993) |

Music video
- "Keep on Dancing" on YouTube

"Keep On Dancing!" is a song by Swiss artist DJ BoBo from his debut album, Dance with Me (1993). It features vocals by Turkish-Swiss singer Emel Aykanat and was released in June 1993 via various labels as the follow-up to his successful 1992 hit single "Somebody Dance with Me". The song was both co-written and co-produced by DJ BoBo with Daniel Peyer, Gutze Gautschi and Mark Wyss. It was a number-one hit in Finland and charted in Europe, Australia and Israel. The accompanying music video was shot in Stockholm, Sweden. "Keep on Dancing!" earned a gold record in Germany with a sale of 250,000 singles.

== Chart performance ==
"Keep On Dancing!" peaked at number one in Finland, as well as peaking at number two in Switzerland for three weeks, behind 4 Non Blondes' "What's Up". The single stayed within the Swiss Schweizer Hitparade singles chart for 25 weeks. In Germany, it peaked at number five for two weeks, while in both Austria and Sweden, it peaked at number seven for one week. On the Eurochart Hot 100, the song reached number ten on 2 October 1993. It entered the chart at number 65 five weeks earlier, on 4 September, after charting in Germany and Switzerland. "Keep on Dancing!" was a top-10 hit also in the Netherlands and Norway, peaking at number nine in both countries. Outside Europe, it peaked at number 54 in Australia and number ten in Israel.

== Track listings ==
- 12", Italy
1. "Keep On Dancing!" (move mix) — 6:10
2. "Keep On Dancing!" (single) — 3:16
3. "Keep On Dancing!" (classic club mix) — 6:10
4. "Keep On Dancing!" (radio mix) — 3:33
- CD single, France
1. "Keep On Dancing!" (radio edit) — 3:33
2. "Somebody Dance with Me" (radio mix) — 3:35
- CD maxi, Germany
1. "Keep On Dancing!" (classic radio mix) — 3:33
2. "Keep On Dancing!" (New Fashion radio edit) — 3:16
3. "Keep On Dancing!" (classic club mix) — 6:10
4. "Keep On Dancing!" (live at the Gersag-Party) — 6:20

== Charts ==
=== Weekly charts ===
| Chart (1993–1994) | Peak position |
|---|---|
| Australia (ARIA) | 54 |
| Austria (Ö3 Austria Top 40) | 7 |
| Europe (Eurochart Hot 100) | 10 |
| Finland (Suomen virallinen lista) | 1 |
| Germany (GfK) | 5 |
| Israel (Israeli Singles Chart) | 10 |
| Netherlands (Dutch Top 40) | 10 |
| Netherlands (Single Top 100) | 9 |
| Norway (VG-lista) | 9 |
| Sweden (Sverigetopplistan) | 7 |
| Switzerland (Schweizer Hitparade) | 2 |

=== Year-end charts ===
| Chart (1993) | Position |
|---|---|
| Europe (Eurochart Hot 100) | 75 |
| Germany (Media Control) | 36 |
| Netherlands (Dutch Top 40) | 84 |
| Netherlands (Single Top 100) | 88 |
| Sweden (Topplistan) | 50 |
| Switzerland (Schweizer Hitparade) | 25 |

== Certifications ==
| Region | Certification | Certified units/sales |
|---|---|---|
| Germany (BVMI) | Gold | 250,000^{^} |
^{^} Shipments figures based on certification alone.
