= Respect Yourself (disambiguation) =

"Respect Yourself" is a 1971 song by The Staple Singers, covered by The Kane Gang, Bruce Willis, and Robert Palmer, among others.

Respect Yourself may also refer to:

- Respect Yourself (album), by Joe Cocker, 2002
- "Respect Yourself" (DJ BoBo song), 1996
- Respect Yourself: The Stax Records Story, a 2009 film, and Respect Yourself: Stax Records and the Soul Explosion, a 2013 book by Robert Gordon
- Respect Yourself, a 1990 book by Noel McGrath
- "Respect yourself", a Delphic maxim

== See also ==
- Stax Records
