= Myron (duo) =

Swiss pop-rock duo

- Origin: Basel, Switzerland
- Genres: Pop rock
- Years active: 2003-present
- Label: Columbia Records (Sony)
- Members: Emanuel Gut (Manu-L); Chris Haffner
- Website: www.myron.ch

Myron is a Swiss pop-rock duo based singing in English language and made up of lead singer Emanuel "Manu" Gut (also widely known by his stage name Manu-L) and songwriter, guitarist and bass player Chris Haffner. The two met while working as studio musicians and they formed the band in 2003, in Basel, Switzerland. The band signed with Columbia Records of Sony BMG in 2007, and has released four albums and a number of singles that charted in Switzerland, with the single "One Step Closer" being their biggest hit. The duo's sound is primarily soft contemporary rock with a definite melodic twist, and soul and pop/country influences. The duo performs their concerts with a full live band including drummer, guitarist and keyboardist.

The band's vocalist has also developed a successful solo singing career in collaboration with a number of producers, primarily with Swiss record producer Remady with whom he has a number of charting hits internationally.

== Career ==
Their first single release was "Say You Want Me" in 2007 available through downloads on iTunes cracking the Swiss charts at number 68 and eventually reaching number 40. They released their debut album On Air on 25 January 2008. It is available both as a download and in stores. On 20 February 2009, the duo released their sophomore album One Step Closer with the title track becoming their biggest charting hit ever in Switzerland reaching number 9 in the Swiss Hitparade, the official Swiss Singles Chart. Their third album was released on 11 February 2011 titled Never Regret with a fourth album scheduled for 2013 called Butterfly with "Every Little" is the pre-release single.

== Discography ==
=== Albums ===
Year	Album	Peak positions	Certification
Year	Album	SUI	Certification
2008	On Air	10	
2009	One Step Closer	10	
2011	Never Regret	6	
2013	Butterfly		

=== Singles ===
Year	Album	Peak positions		Certification
Year	Album	SUI	GER	Certification
2007	"Say You Want Me"	40	–	On Air
2008	"I Don't Care"	–	–	On Air
2009	"One Step Closer"	9	–	One Step Closer
2009	"Wonderful to Me" (with Jenniffer Kae)	54	93	One Step Closer
2011	"If It End"	35	–	Never Regret
