= Hotter Than Fire =

Single by Eric Saade featuring Dev

from the album Saade Vol. 2
- Released: 2 November 2011
- Recorded: 2011
- Genre: Europop; electropop
- Length: 3:19
- Label: Roxy Recordings; All Around The World Productions
- Songwriter(s): Eric Saade; Jason Gill; J-Son; Devin Tailes

Eric Saade singles chronology
"Hearts in the Air" (2011)	"Hotter Than Fire" (2011)	"Imagine" (2012)

Dev singles chronology
"Hey Hey Hey (Pop Another Bottle)" (2011)	"Hotter Than Fire" (2011)	"Naked" (2011)

"Hotter Than Fire" is a song by Swedish singer Eric Saade and American singer Dev. It is the first single from Saade's third album, Saade Vol. 2, and was first released on 2 November 2011 in Sweden. The song reached #5 in Sweden.

== Background ==
"Hotter Than Fire" was written by Eric Saade, Jason Gill, Devin Tailes, and J-Son. The song was recorded in 2011.

The collaboration with Dev started after Saade saw the video of her single Bass Down Low. Dev heard an early demo of Hotter Than Fire and said immediately yes after they asked her if she wanted to join the song. About the song and the collaboration with Dev, Saade said: "It's a song that shows quite clearly where I am going. I love electro-pop and I feel like I'm in the middle of the development to begin to find what I want to do. When Dev wanted to sing on the song it became the icing on the cake. Her 'rap song' style was so perfect for the song. She made it sexy."

== Other versions ==
Remixes of the song were released on 30 November 2011 in Sweden. The remixes are from Niclas Kings. A remixed version by LMC was released as a single in the UK in 2012.

== Critical reception ==
Idolator wrote that the song is "a blazing dance-pop jam" and compared it to Usher's "DJ Got Us Fallin' in Love".

== Music video ==
The music video premiered on 7 December 2011. It was shot in one take and filmed on 19 November 2011 in Spain, Sweden and the United Kingdom. Dev, since pregnant, filmed her part in the United States.

== Charts ==
Weekly chart performance for "Hotter Than Fire"
Chart (2011–2013)	Peak position
Belgium (Ultratip Bubbling Under Wallonia)	23
Belgium (Ultratop Wallonia Dance)	48
Sweden (Sverigetopplistan)	5

== Release history ==
Release history and formats for "Hotter Than Fire"
Country	Date	Format	Label
Sweden	2 November 2011	CD single; digital download	Roxy Recordings
Sweden (Remixes)	30 November 2011	CD single; digital download	Roxy Recordings
