= Remady & Manu-L =

- Origin: Zürich, Switzerland
- Genres: Deep house
- Occupation: Record producers
- Years active: 2010–present
- Labels: Phonag
- Members: Manu-L (Emanuel Gut); Remady (Marc Würgler)

Remady & Manu-L is a Swiss deep house duo consisting of Manu-L (born: Emanuel Gut; 28 November 1983) and Remady (born: Marc Würgler; 12 December 1977).

== Career ==
=== Members ===
Manu-L (born: Emanuel Gut; 28 November 1983), formed a pop duo called Myron in 2003 as the vocalist and guitarist, together with songwriter, guitarist and bass player Chris Haffner in Basel. The duo signed to Columbia Records of Sony BMG in 2007.

Remady (born: Marc Würgler; 12 December 1977) initially used the name Player & Remady (also known as Remady P&R) before simply using "Remady". He achieved his first commercially successful album No Superstar (The Album) which featured singles "Give Me A Sign", "Save Your Heart", "No Superstar" and "Do It On My Own". "Give Me A Sign" earned him an NRJ award. He has collaborated extensively with Manu-L, prior to forming the duo.

=== History ===
In 2010, they formed the duo Remady & Manu-L. Their song "Single Ladies" featuring J-Son reached number 1 in 2012 in the Swiss Singles chart and was certified double platinum. "Somebody Dance with Me Remady 2013 Mix", reached number 4 and "Holidays" reached number 3 in Switzerland.

== Discography ==
=== Albums ===
| Title | Album | Peak chart positions |
| Title | Album | SWI |
|---|---|---|
| The Original | Released: March 23, 2012; Label: Phonag Records; Format: CD | 5 |
| The Original 2k13 | Released: February 22, 2013; Label: Phonag Records; Format: CD | — |
| 1+1=3 | Released: May 1, 2015; Label: No Superstar Production; Format: CD | 3 |

=== Singles ===
| Title | Year | Peak chart positions | | | | Certifications | Album |
| Title | Year | SWI | AUT | FRA | GER | Certifications | Album |
|---|---|---|---|---|---|---|---|
| "Single Ladies" (featuring J-Son) | 2012 | 1 | 45 | 83 | 41 | IFPI SWI: 2× Platinum | The Original |
| "Doing It Right" (featuring Amanda Wilson) | 2012 | 15 | — | — | — | | The Original |
| "Higher Ground" | 2012 | 28 | — | — | — | | The Original |
| "Hollywood Ending" (featuring J-Son) | 2013 | 21 | — | — | — | | The Original 2k13 |
| "It′s So Easy" | 2013 | 18 | — | — | — | | The Original 2k13 |
| "Holidays" | 2013 | 3 | — | — | — | | Non-album singles |
| "In My Dreams" | 2014 | 5 | — | — | — | | Non-album singles |
| "Waiting For" | 2014 | 10 | — | — | — | | 1+1=3 |
| "Livin' la vida" (featuring J-Son) | 2015 | 46 | — | — | — | | 1+1=3 |
| "Together We Are One (Bring Back the Energy)" (featuring Culcha Candela) | 2015 | 11 | — | — | — | | Non-album singles |
| "Another Day in Paradise" | 2016 | 4 | — | — | — | | Non-album singles |
| "L.I.F.E." | 2016 | 14 | — | — | — | | Non-album singles |
| "Give Me Love" | 2017 | 33 | — | — | — | | Non-album singles |
| "Back Again" (featuring Lyracis) | 2018 | 92 | — | — | — | | Non-album singles |
