= Encyclopedia of Australian Rock and Pop =

Book by Ian McFarlane

The Encyclopedia of Australian Rock and Pop
- Author: Ian McFarlane
- Language: English
- Subject: Australian rock music history
- Publisher: Allen & Unwin
- Publication date: December 1999
- Publication place: Australia
- Pages: 717
- ISBN: 1-86508-072-1
- OCLC: 59566131
- Dewey Decimal: 781.66/0994/03 21
- LC Class: ML102.R6 M38 1999

The Encyclopedia of Australian Rock and Pop or Rock and Pop by Australian music journalist Ian McFarlane is a guide to Australian popular music from the 1950s to the late 1990s. The book has a similar title to the 1978 work by Noel McGrath, Australian Encyclopaedia of Rock and Pop, but is not otherwise related.

Publishers Allen & Unwin described McFarlane's encyclopedia as containing over 870 entries and an "essential reference to the bands and artists who molded the shape of Australian popular music [...] in an A-to-Z encyclopedia format complete with biographical and historical details. Each entry also includes listings of original band lineups and subsequent changes, record releases, career highlights, and cross-references with related bands and artists."

The first edition is out of print, but was for a time available on the whammo.com.au online record store, and is still in the Internet Archive. In 2017 a second edition was published by Third Stone Press.

== Reviews ==
The first edition was described in Australian Music Guide as "the most exhaustive and wide-ranging encyclopedia of Australian music from the 1950s onwards".

The second edition appeared in 2017 and was updated to 2016. Steven Carroll of The Sydney Morning Herald opined that "Any survey of Australian pop and rock that includes entries on such bands as Serious Young Insects (via Boom Crash Opera) is a serious tome. It's so easy to get lost in this revised edition: one band leading to another, and so on, until you're suddenly asking yourself what happened to the last hour."
