= Hearts in the Air =

2011 single by Eric Saade

Single by Eric Saade featuring J-Son

from the album Saade Vol. 1
- Released: 3 June 2011
- Length: 3:59
- Label: Roxy Recordings; All Around the World
- Songwriters: Julimar Santos; Eric Saade; Jason Gill; Robin Fredriksson; Mattias Larsson
- Producer: Gill

Eric Saade singles chronology
| "Popular" (2011) | "Hearts in the Air" (2011) | "Hotter Than Fire" (2011) |

J-Son singles chronology
| "Destination Sky" (2011) | "Hearts in the Air" (2011) | "Stop Me" (2011) |

Music video
- "Hearts in the Air" on YouTube

"Hearts in the Air" is a song by Swedish singer Eric Saade, featuring Swedish rapper J-Son, from Saade's second studio album, Saade Vol. 1 (2011). Saade co-wrote the song with Robin Fredriksson, Mattias Larsson, and J-Son along with its producer Jason Gill. Featuring guest vocals from J-Son. The song was released on 3 June 2011 through Roxy Recordings, serving as the third single from the album.

"Hearts in the Air" peaked at number two in Sweden, becoming his third top-three single in the country. It also managed to chart in Russia and Ukraine. The song has been certified gold by the Swedish Recording Industry Association (GLF) for selling more than 20,000 copies in the region.

In 2017, Swedish synth-pop duo Icona Pop covered and rearranged the song as "Heart in the Air" in the eighth season of the Swedish reality television show, Så mycket bättre. The version peaked at number seventy in Sweden. In the show, Saade recorded the cover version of the duo's 2012 song, "We Got The World".

== Commercial performance ==
"Hearts in the Air" debuted at number two in Sweden, becoming Saade's third top-three single as well as J-Son's first charting single. The song charted in the country for fifteen weeks and has been certified gold by the Swedish Recording Industry Association (GLF) for selling more than 20,000 copies in the region.

== Music video ==
The music video, directed by Swedish director Patric Ullaeus, premiered on 29 June 2011. About the video, Eric Saade said that “it's a video with a lot of summer feelings from [him] and J-Son”.

== Track listing ==
Digital download, CD
| No. | Title | Length |
|---|---|---|
| 1. | "Hearts in the Air" (featuring J-Son) | 3:59 |

Digital download – Remixes
| No. | Title | Length |
|---|---|---|
| 1. | "Hearts in the Air" (featuring J-Son; The Alias Remix Edit) | 3:50 |
| 2. | "Hearts in the Air" (featuring J-Son; Original Mix) | 4:00 |
| 3. | "Hearts in the Air" (featuring J-Son; Lockout's Hands in the Air Remix) | 5:33 |
| 4. | "Hearts in the Air" (featuring J-Son; The Alias Remix) | 5:33 |
| 5. | "Hearts in the Air" (featuring J-Son; Stormby Club Mix) | 5:55 |
| 6. | "Hearts in the Air" (featuring J-Son; Stormby Radio Edit) | 4:04 |

== Credits ==
Credits adapted from Saade Vol. 1's liner notes.

- Eric Saade – lead vocals, songwriting
- Julimar Santos – featured vocals, songwriting
- Jason Gill - songwriting, production, programming, instruments, backing vocals, recording engineering
- Robin Fredriksson – songwriting
- Mattias Larsson – songwriting
- Henrik Edenhed – mixing engineering
- Björn Engelmann – mastering

== Charts ==
Weekly chart performance for "Hearts in the Air"
| Chart (2011) | Peak position |
|---|---|
| Sweden (Sverigetopplistan) | 2 |

== Certifications ==
Certifications for "Hearts in the Air"
| Region | Certification | Certified units/sales |
|---|---|---|
| Sweden (GLF) | Gold | 20,000^{‡} |
^{‡} Sales+streaming figures based on certification alone.

== Release history ==
Release history and formats for "Hearts in the Air"
| Country | Date | Format | Label | Ref. |
|---|---|---|---|---|
| Sweden | 3 June 2011 | CD single; digital download | Roxy Recordings | |
| Norway | 3 June 2011 | Digital download | Roxy Recordings | |
| France | 28 September 2011 | Digital download | Roxy Recordings | |
| Ireland | 11 December 2011 | Digital download (remixes) | All Around the World Productions | |
| United Kingdom | 11 December 2011 | Digital download (remixes) | All Around the World Productions | |

== Icona Pop version ==
"Heart in the Air"

Single by Icona Pop

from the album Så mycket bättre 2017 – Tolkningarna
- Released: 12 November 2017
- Recorded: 2017
- Length: 2:21
- Label: TEN; Big Beat; Atlantic
- Songwriters: Julimar Santos; Eric Saade; Jason Gill; Robin Fredriksson; Mattias Larsson; Aino Jawo; Caroline Hjelt
- Producers: Emanuel Abrahamsson; Nicki Adamsson

Icona Pop singles chronology
| "Not Too Young" (2017) | "Heart in the Air" (2017) | "Rhythm in My Blood" (2018) |

Music video
- "Heart in the Air" on YouTube

In 2017, Swedish synth-pop duo Icona Pop recorded the cover and rearranged version of "Hearts in the Air" as a part of the eighth season of the Swedish reality television show, Så mycket bättre. The version, titled "Heart in the Air", was released on November 12, 2017 through TEN Music Group, Big Beat, and Atlantic Records. The version was rearranged by the duo with the altered lyrics and melodies and produced by Emanuel Abrahamsson and Nicki Adamsson. Later, the version was on their extended play, Så mycket bättre 2017 – Tolkningarna (2017), which compiles all the songs the duo performed on the show.

=== Background ===
Icona Pop and Eric Saade appeared on the eighth season of the Swedish reality television show, Så mycket bättre (2017), along with Kikki Danielsson, Sabina Ddumba, Moneybrother, Uno Svenningsson and Tomas Andersson Wij. In the show, the musicians rearrange and record the hit songs by each musician, and the duo picked "Hearts in the Air" from Saade's discography. The performance was televised on November 11, 2017, on TV4.

=== Chart performance ===
The cover version debuted at number seventy in Sweden, becoming the duo's twelfth charting single in the region. It charted on the chart for two weeks.

=== Charts ===
Weekly chart performance for Icona Pop's version of "Hearts in the Air"
| Chart (2017) | Peak position |
|---|---|
| Sweden (Sverigetopplistan) | 70 |
