= Everybody (DJ BoBo song) =

Single by DJ BoBo

from the album Dance with Me
- B-side: "Let Yourself Be Free"
- Released: May 1994
- Genre: Euro-reggae
- Length: 3:51
- Label: Fresh
- Songwriters: René Baumann; Daniel Peyer; Joe South
- Producers: René Baumann; Gutze Gautschi; Mark Wyss

DJ BoBo singles chronology
"Take Control" (1993)	"Everybody" (1994)	"Let the Dream Come True" (1994)

Music video
- "Everybody" on YouTube

"Everybody" is a song by Swiss Eurodance artist DJ BoBo, released in May 1994 by Fresh label as the fourth and last single from the artist's debut album, Dance with Me (1993). Both co-written and co-produced by him, it features vocals performed by Jennifer Rüsch and was a hit across Europe. It reached the number-one position in Finland as well as number two in Germany, where the single was certified platinum. Additionally, "Everybody" was a top 10-hit also in Switzerland, Iceland and the Netherlands, peaking at numbers three, eight and ten, respectively. The accompanying music video was directed by Giacomo de Simone and filmed in Italy and Spain.

In 2002, DJ BoBo released "Everybody" as a duet with Swedish singer Emilia on his first compilation album, Celebration (2002). And in 2015, a new version of the song, remixed by Mike Candys and featuring Romanian singer Inna, was released.

== Critical reception ==
Alan Jones from Music Week wrote, "Another Euro-smash, this time from Switzerland. A stuttering pop/reggae confection on which BoBo raps, while his anonymous female companion handles the chorus. Highly commercial and certain to register, though probably not as highly as some of the recent Continental contenders." Johnny Cigarettes from NME said, "...and even though we get an authentic hurdy-hurdy accented rap complete with poor rhymes, the song sounds like Ace of Base after a Mogadon-guzzling party with Bucks Fizz." James Hamilton from the Record Mirror Dance Update described it as a "Swiss DJ muttered and girl chorused bland Ace of Base-ish jogging pop reggae Euro smash" in his weekly dance column.

== Chart performance ==
"Everybody" was quite successful on the charts across Europe and remains one of DJ BoBo's biggest hits, peaking at number-one in Finland for two weeks as well as number two in Germany for five weeks, behind "I Swear" by All-4-One. It stayed for 27 weeks within the German Singles Chart, with 12 of them inside the top 10 and received a platinum certification after 500,000 singles were sold there. "Everybody" was a top-10 hit also in Iceland (8), Lithuania (4), the Netherlands (10) and in DJ BoBo's native Switzerland (3). On the Eurochart Hot 100, the single peaked at number ten in August 1994 after six weeks on the chart. It ended up as number 73 on their year-end list of the best-selling singles in Europe. Additionally, it was a top-20 hit in Sweden, a top-30 hit in Austria and a top-40 hit in Belgium. In the United Kingdom, "Everybody" was the first song by DJ BoBo to chart on the UK Singles Chart, peaking at number 47 in its first week on the chart, on September 18, 1994. On the UK Dance Singles Chart, it fared better, peaking at number 31, and it was also a small club hit. Outside Europe, "Everybody" was a huge hit in Israel, peaking at number four, and it also became a top-10 hit in El Savador and Peru, in Latin America. In Australia, it ended up at number 85 on the ARIA singles chart.

== Music video ==
The music video for "Everybody" was directed by Italian director Giacomo de Simone, who directed music videos for many other Eurodance acts, like Corona, Ice MC and Whigfield, it was shot in Porto Venere, Italy and Mallorca, Spain. It features DJ BoBo performing the song while driving an old car or singing and dancing with people in the city of Porto Venere. The video was A-listed on German music television channel VIVA in July 1994. An official live video from one of DJ BoBo's concerts, where the singer performs "Everybody" on stage, was later made available on DJ BoBo's official YouTube channel in 2009, and had generated more than 168 million views as of early 2025 on the platform.

== Track listing ==
- 7", UK
1. "Everybody" (Radio Version) — 3:51
2. "Let Yourself Be Free" — 4:20
- 12", Italy
1. "Everybody" (4th on the Floor Mix) — 6:12
2. "Everybody" (Radio Mix) — 3:51
3. "Everybody" (Tribe Mix) — 3:00
4. "Let Yourself Be Free" — 4:20
5. "Everybody" (First Edition) — 3:53
- CD single, France
1. "Everybody" (Radio Mix) — 3:51
2. "Everybody" (On the Floor Mix) — 6:13
- CD maxi, Switzerland
1. "Everybody" (Radio Mix) — 3:51
2. "Everybody" (4 on the Floor Mix) — 6:12
3. "Let Yourself Be Free — 4:20
4. "Everybody" (First Edition) — 3:53

== Charts ==
=== Weekly charts ===
Chart (1994)	Peak position
Australia (ARIA)	85
Austria (Ö3 Austria Top 40)	24
Belgium (Ultratop 50 Flanders)	35
El Salvador (UPI)	6
Europe (Eurochart Hot 100)	10
Europe (European Dance Radio)	18
Finland (Finland's Official List)	1
Germany (Media Control Charts)	2
Iceland (Íslenski Listinn Topp 40)	8
Israel (Israeli Singles Chart)	4
Lithuania (M-1)	4
Netherlands (Dutch Top 40)	10
Netherlands (Single Top 100)	12
Peru (UPI)	9
Scotland (OCC)	56
Sweden (Sverigetopplistan)	20
Switzerland (Schweizer Hitparade)	3
UK Singles (OCC)	47
UK Dance (OCC)	31
UK Dance (Music Week)	31
UK Club Chart (Music Week)	76

=== Year-end charts ===
Chart (1994)	Position
Europe (Eurochart Hot 100)	73
Germany (Media Control)	10
Netherlands (Dutch Top 40)	59
Netherlands (Single Top 100)	81
Switzerland (Schweizer Hitparade)	6

== Certifications ==
Region	Certification	Certified units/sales
Germany (BVMI)	Platinum	500,000^{^}
^{^} Shipments figures based on certification alone.
