= Saade Vol. 2 =

Studio album by Eric Saade
- Released: 30 November 2011
- Genre: Pop; dance; Europop
- Label: Roxy

Eric Saade chronology
Saade Vol. 1 (2011)	Saade Vol. 2 (2011)	Forgive Me (2013)

Singles from Saade Vol. 2
- 1. "Hotter Than Fire" Released: 2 November 2011

Saade Vol. 2 is the third studio album by Swedish singer Eric Saade. It was released on November 30, 2011 by Roxy Recordings. The album was released as the second part of the album series, following Saade Vol. 1 (2011).

Saade Vol. 2 has spawned one single, "Hotter Than Fire". The single was released on November 2, 2011 as the first and the only single from the album. The song peaked at number five in Sweden as well as reaching top 40 in Belgium. The song features the guest vocal by American singer Dev.

Commercially, the album was a success, becoming Saade's second number one album in Sweden and ranked as the eighth best-selling album of 2011 in the country. It also charted at number forty-six in Finland.

== Background ==
In May 2011, it revealed that Saade would release his upcoming album Saade in two parts. As the reason for that Saade said: “I didn't wanna waste too many songs on one album, so I decided to do two parts of my Album Saade. We have been working day and night with the sounds, to be correct and find the right synths etc. I just felt that I'm in a great songwriting mood, so I had to release two parts because of all these songs.” To do this step, he was inspired by Robyn who released her album Body Talk in three parts.

From 21 November until 29 November 2011, scandipop.co.uk released previews of the songs. On 27 November 2011, wackymusiccrazy.org released previews of the songs Explosive Love, Rocket Science and Fingerprints.

== Track listing ==
Saade Vol. 2 track listing
No.	Title	Writer(s)	Length
1.	"Sky Falls Down" (featuring J-Son)	Saade, Masato M., Gill & Santos	3:30
2.	"Rocket Science"	Saade, Gill & Santos, Salem Al Fakir	3:29
3.	"Hotter Than Fire" (featuring Dev)	Saade, Gill & Santos, Devin Tailes	3:21
4.	"Love Is Calling"	Saade, Gill, Robin Fredriksson & Mattias Larsson	4:05
5.	"Crashed on the Dance Floor"	Saade, Gill & Santos, Cutfather, Daniel Davidsen	3:36
6.	"Explosive Love"	Saade, Gill & Santos, Ilya KnocDown	3:22
7.	"Backseat"	Saade, Masato M., Gill & Santos, Cutfather, Daniel Davidsen	3:32
8.	"Feel Alive"	Saade, Masato M., Gill & Santos, Ilya KnocDown	4:21
9.	"Fingerprints"	Saade, Gill, Mattias Fredriksson & Mattias Larsson	3:41
10.	"Without You I'm Nothing"	Saade, Masato M., Gill & Santos	5:50

== Awards, nominations and certifications ==
The album was nominated for a Scandipop Award 2011 in the Best Male Album category.

== Singles ==
The first single of the album "Hotter Than Fire" was first released on 2 November 2011 in Sweden. It is a collaboration with American singer Dev. The song reached #5 in Sweden.

== Charts ==
=== Weekly charts ===
Chart (2011)	Peak position
Finnish Albums Chart	46
Swedish Albums Chart	1

=== Year-end charts ===
Chart (2011)	Position
Swedish Albums Chart	8

== Certifications ==
Certifications for Saade Vol. 2
Region	Certification	Certified units/sales
Sweden (GLF)	Platinum	40,000^{‡}
^{‡} Sales+streaming figures based on certification alone.

== Release history ==
Country	Date	Format	Label
Sweden	30 November 2011	CD single, digital download	Roxy Recordings
