= Manu-L =

- Born: Emanuel Gut; 28 November 1983 (age 42)
- Occupation: Record producer

Emanuel Gut (born 28 November 1983) better known by his stage name Manu-L, is a Swiss singer and musician. The name is derived from his given name stylized in a different fashion. He is best known for being part of the musical duos, Myron and Remady & Manu-L.

== Career ==
=== Myron ===
He is the vocalist and guitarist for the Swiss pop band duo Myron, a duo he formed in 2003 in Basel with songwriter, guitarist and bass player Chris Haffner. The band is signed since 2007 with Columbia Records of Sony BMG. The band has four albums and a number of charting singles and is most famous for the single "One Step Closer" that made it to number 9 in Swiss Hitparade, the official Swiss Singles Chart.

=== Remady & Manu-L ===
He has also developed a solo singing career closely collaborating since 2010 with Swiss music producer Remady. He has had a string of hits where he is featured, very notably with "Single Ladies" with Remady and J-Son reaching number 1 in 2012 in Swiss Singles Chart, going double platinum, "Somebody Dance with Me Remady 2013 Mix", a remake of DJ BoBo hit with Remady reaching number 4 and "Holidays" with Remady also in 2013 reaching number three.

== Discography ==
=== Singles ===
==== As featured artist ====
Single	Year	Charts					Certification	Album
Single	Year	SWI	AUT	BEL (W)	FR	GER	Certification	Album
"Give Me a Sign" (Remady featuring Manu-L)	2010	11	55	46	11	—	IFPI SWI: Gold	No Superstar - The Album
"Save Your Heart" (Remady featuring Manu-L)	2011	41	—	—	38	—		No Superstar - The Album
"The Way We Are" (Remady featuring Manu-L)	2011	30	—	—	60	—		No Superstar - The Album
"If You Believe" (Remady featuring Manu-L)	2011	—	—	—	—	—		No Superstar - The Album
"Somebody Dance with Me" (Remady 2013 Mix) (DJ BoBo featuring Manu-L)	2013	4	—	—	—	61		Non-album single

== See also ==
- Remady & Manu-L
- Myron (duo)
