= Still Loving It =

Song by Eric Saade

from the album Saade Vol. 1
- Released: January 14, 2011
- Genre: Pop
- Length: 3:44
- Label: Roxy Recordings
- Songwriters: Anton Malmberg Hård Af Segerstad, Eric Saade, Niclas Lundin

Still Loving It is an English language song performed by Swedish singer Eric Saade. It taken from Saade's second album, Saade Vol. 1, and was first released on 14 January 2011 in Sweden.

== Track listings ==
Digital download
No.	Title	Length
1.	"Still Loving It"	3:44

== Release history ==
Country	Date	Format	Label
Sweden	14 January 2011	CD single, digital download	Roxy Recordings
