= Emel Aykanat =

Turkish-Swiss singer

Emel
- Birth name: Emel Aykanat
- Born: 8 June 1975 (age 50)
- Origin: Switzerland
- Genres: Dance, Hi-NRG, Europop, Eurodance
- Occupation(s): Singer, songwriter, dancer
- Years active: 1993–present

Emel Aykanat (born 8 June 1975), better known as Emel, is a Turkish-Swiss singer. Her first big success came with the single Somebody Dance with Me with DJ BoBo.

== Career ==
At the age of 17 years, she toured as a background singer with Six Was Nine, a German pop and soul band, through Europe.

Aykanat's first success was in 1993 as a female voice in the song Somebody Dance with Me by DJ BoBo which appeared in various clubs. Her first album Can we Talk appeared in 1996 and reached 26th in the Swiss charts.

In 2001, Aykanat was part of a duet with the Swiss rapper Bligg.

In 2004, Aykanat was the Swiss spokesperson for Eurovision Song Contest 2004. Aykanat was also part of the Swiss jury in the Eurovision Song Contest 2009.

The current album Come into my life was the first German-language album in 2007.

She entered the Swiss selection for the Eurovision Song Contest 2012, with a song called "She".

== Discography ==
=== Singles ===
- 1996: "Sunshine"
- 1997: "On And On"
- 1999: "Everything"
- 2001: "Alles scho mal ghört" (with Bligg)
- 2008: "Wenn es regnet"
- 2011: "She"

=== Albums ===
- 1996: Can We Talk
- 1999: Free
- 2007: Komm in mein Leben

=== Chart positions ===
| Year | Single | Chart positions | | | | | | | | | | | Album |
| Year | Single | SWI | GER | AUT | SWE | FIN | NL | NOR | AUS | FRA | BEL | ITA | Album |
|---|---|---|---|---|---|---|---|---|---|---|---|---|---|
| 1992 | Somebody Dance with Me | 1 | 4 | 3 | 1 | 5 | 3 | 3 | 13 | - | - | - | |
| 1993 | Keep On Dancing! | 2 | 5 | 7 | 7 | 1 | 9 | 9 | 54 | - | - | - | |
| 1994 | Everybody | 3 | 2 | 24 | 20 | 1 | 12 | 3 | 85 | - | 35 | - | |
