= Freedom (DJ BoBo song) =

Single by DJ BoBo

from the album There Is a Party
- B-side: "Feel the Heat"
- Released: September 1995
- Genre: Eurodance
- Length: 3:53
- Label: EAMS; ZYX Music; Do It Music; Fresh Music; Scandinavian Records
- Songwriters: Alex Trime; René Baumann; Sven Delgado Jordan
- Producers: René Baumann; Axel Breitung

DJ BoBo singles chronology
"There Is a Party" (1995)	"Freedom" (1995)	"Love Is the Price" (1996)

Music video
- "Freedom" on YouTube

"Freedom" is a song by Swiss Eurodance artist DJ BoBo, released in September 1995 by several labels as the fourth and final single from his second album, There Is a Party (1994). The song was co-written and co-produced by the artist, featuring vocals by Natascha Wright and Lisa Noya. It was a European top-10 hit in Austria, Finland, Germany and Switzerland. On the Eurochart Hot 100, the single peaked at number 15 in November 1995, ending up as number 57 on its year-end chart. "Freedom" was certified gold in Germany after 250,000 singles were sold there. Outside Europe, it charted in Israel and Australia. The accompanying music video was directed by Frank Paul Husmann-Labusga.

== Critical reception ==
Pan-European magazine Music & Media wrote that "DJ Bobo aka Rene Baumann never fails to deliver the hits. Once again, a catchy chorus and an instantly recognizable melody superimposed on a driving beat provide the goods needed." In their review of the There Is a Party album, the song was named "a gambler's best bet."

== Music video ==
The music video for "Freedom" was directed by Frank Paul Husmann-Labusga and filmed in Landschaftspark Duisburg-Nord, Germany and produced by Music In Motion GmbH. It was A-listed on German music television channel VIVA in October 1995. Husmann-Labusga had previously directed the videos for "Let the Dream Come True", "Love Is All Around" and "There Is a Party".

== Track listings ==
- 12", Netherlands
1. "Freedom" (club mix) — 6:14
2. "Freedom" (underground house mix) — 4:08
3. "Feel the Heat" — 5:29
- CD single, France
1. "Freedom" (radio version) — 3:53
2. "Freedom" (club mix) — 6:14
3. "Freedom" (underground house mix) — 4:08
- CD maxi, Switzerland
1. "Freedom" (radio version) — 3:53
2. "Freedom" (club mix) — 6:14
3. "Freedom" (underground house mix) — 4:08
4. "Feel the Heat" — 5:29

== Charts ==
=== Weekly charts ===
1995 weekly chart performance for "Freedom"
Chart (1995)	Peak position
Australia (ARIA)	93
Austria (Ö3 Austria Top 40)	7
Europe (Eurochart Hot 100)	15
Finland (Suomen virallinen lista)	7
Germany (GfK)	8
Israel (Israeli Singles Chart)	21
Netherlands (Dutch Top 40)	21
Netherlands (Single Top 100)	22
Sweden (Sverigetopplistan)	31
Switzerland (Schweizer Hitparade)	4

2024 weekly chart performance for "Freedom"
Chart (2024)	Peak position
Lithuania Airplay (TopHit)	4

=== Monthly charts ===
2024 monthly chart performance for "Freedom"
Chart (2024)	Peak position
Lithuania Airplay (TopHit)	55

=== Year-end charts ===
1995 year-end chart performance for "Freedom"
Chart (1995)	Position
Europe (Eurochart Hot 100)	57
Germany (Media Control)	60
Netherlands (Dutch Top 40)	155
Switzerland (Schweizer Hitparade)	44

== Certifications ==
Region	Certification	Certified units/sales
Germany (BVMI)	Gold	250,000^{^}
^{^} Shipments figures based on certification alone.
