= Yaiya =

Musical artist

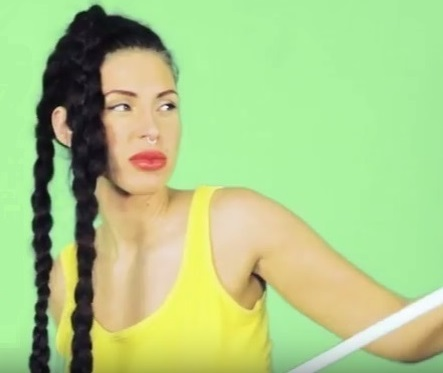
- Yaiya in 2017

Background information
- Origin: Boden, Sweden
- Genres: Pop, Soul, R&B, Rock
- Occupations: Artist, actor, singer, songwriter, director
- Instruments: Vocals, guitar
- Years active: 2007–present
- Labels: WorldMusic Records (2007–)
- Website: ymperia.com/yaiya

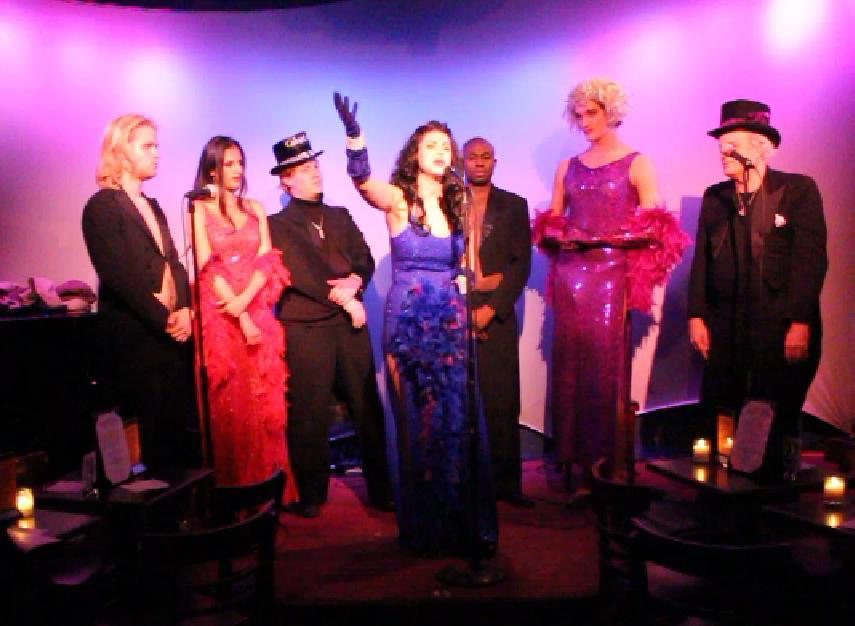
Yaiya performs "With a Song in My Heart" in New York in 2011

Serafime Yaiya Sandra Carola Siekas (born 15 April 1990), known as Yaiya, is a Swedish-Sámi entertainment artist, singer, songwriter, actor and film director living in Stockholm, Sweden. She started performing at the age of 6 and won different talent shows like Swedish Radio's national talent show 2008 with Sapphire Sky.

In 2007 a radio station in France released the album Générations 88.2, a collection of 15 CDs described as the best hits 1997-2007, featuring Yaiya's song I'ma Do It (Anyway ft. NewKid). The album also featured artists like Ciara, Timbaland, Brian McKnight, Snoop Dogg, Dr. Dre, D'Angelo, Nas and Swedish rapper Promoe.

Yaiya is related to the Norwegian Sámi singer Mari Boine, 6th cousin.

== Acting ==
Yaiya made a guest appearance on Swedish TV channel Kanal 5's hidden camera show Svärföräldrarna från helvetet as the ex-girlfriend Sandy. She was also the face and producer of an online talent show iDream and hosted Season 1, November 2010 - April 2011. In commercial video, she has been a main representative of the Carlsberg Group soft drink Festis.

Yaiya (as Yaiya Sacasios) headlined Cabaret Large A-Cup in Manhattan at the Metropolitan Room.

== Film production ==
At the age of 14 Yaiya founded her company Ymperia and started to teach performance and film acting with her mother Carola Siekas Kostenius. 2012 they opened Ymperia Academy in Stockholm, Sweden and presented The Ymperian Method to their students. Yaiya directed a lot of films and in 2015 she won Skellefteå Krafts Competition Brainpower with her 14 seconds short film What Makes The World Go 'Round?

A well-made film that, in 14 short seconds, may bring thoughts about the world we live in and the role of the individuals in this. It becomes a clear message that the brain has never been more important than now. It is necessary that the brain's capacity is used to enable us as individuals to develop new innovations that can positively affect the future - it requires brain power!

— Motivation of The Skellefteå Kraft Jury

2016 and 2017 Ymperia Academy won Artisternas Hatt for "the widest course offer for cultural workers".

== Discography ==
- Sapphire Sky (2007)
- Ima Do It (Anyway) ft. Newkid - released in France on the album "Générations 88.2" (2007)
- Lumumba - Lalcko ft. YAIYA - released in France on Lalcko's debut album (2008)
- I Can't Help Making Music (2009)
- Handcuffed Contract (2009)
- My Window - J-Son ft. YAIYA (2009)
- Pure Heart (2010)
- Whiteboy - SHY ft. YAIYA (2011)
- Juuret ft. Bengt Kostenius & Orlando Siekas (2016)
- Jag går bredvid (2021)
