= There Is a Party (song) =

Single by DJ BoBo

from the album There Is a Party
- Released: May 1995
- Genre: Eurodance; reggae
- Length: 4:09
- Label: EAMS
- Songwriters: René Baumann; Axel Breitung
- Producer: René Baumann

DJ BoBo singles chronology
"Love Is All Around" (1995)	"There Is a Party" (1995)	"Freedom" (1995)

Music video
- "There Is a Party" on YouTube

"There Is a Party" is a song by Swiss artist DJ BoBo, released in May 1995, by label EAMS, as the third single from his second album by the same name (1995). The song was written by the artist with Axel Breitung, and produced by DJ BoBo. It features vocals by American singer Lori Glori (a.k.a. Lori Hölzel) and was a top-10 hit in Belgium, and a top-20 hit in Finland, Germany, Lithuania, the Netherlands and Switzerland. On the Eurochart Hot 100, it peaked at number 33. Outside Europe, the single charted in Australia, Brazil, Canada and El Salvador. In Brazil, it became one of the most-played songs on radio in 1995. "There Is a Party" received a gold certification in Germany after 250,000 singles were sold there. The music video was filmed in the US, in Florida.

== Critical reception ==
In their review of the There Is a Party album, pan-European magazine Music & Media wrote, "A truly new musical direction is distinct by the reggae-tinged title track. We hear a guitar and it's like the Boney M girls are looking over Bobo's shoulders. One key to Euro's future is in Bobo's hands."

== Music video ==
The accompanying music video for "There Is a Party" was directed by Frank Paul Husmann-Labusga and filmed in Miami, Florida. It depicts DJ BoBo stranded at an island, being rescued by a ship with partying people. The video was A-listed on German music television channel VIVA in September 1995. Husman-Labusga had previously directed the videos for "Let the Dream Come True" and "Love Is All Around", which also were filmed in the US. "There Is a Party" was later made available on DJ BoBo's official YouTube channel in 2013, having generated more than 46 million views as of late 2025.

== Track listing ==
- 12", Germany
1. "There Is a Party" (Extended Mix) — 7:02
2. "There Is a Party" (B&B D.J. Remix) — 3:51
3. "There Is a Party" (Radio Mix) — 4:09
4. "There Is a Party" (A&R Rhythm Nation Remix) — 4:40
- CD single, France
1. "There Is a Party" (Radio Mix) — 4:09
2. "There Is a Party" (Extended Mix) — 7:02
3. "There Is a Party" (B&B D.J. Remix) — 3:51
- CD maxi, Europe
1. "There Is a Party" (Radio Mix) — 4:09
2. "There Is a Party" (Extended Mix) — 7:02
3. "There Is a Party" (B&B D.J. Remix) — 3:51
4. "There Is a Party" (A&R Rhythm Nation Remix) — 4:40
- CD maxi (dance remixes), Australia & New Zealand
1. "There Is a Party" (PDJ Team Radio Edit) — 4:14
2. "There Is a Party" (PDJ Team Remix) — 5:43
3. "There Is a Party" (Nu-Q Remix) — 5:48
4. "Love Is All Around" (Hyper NRG Mix) — 7:19

== Charts ==
=== Weekly charts ===
Chart (1995)	Peak position
Australia (ARIA)	89
Austria (Ö3 Austria Top 40)	29
Belgium (Ultratop 50 Flanders)	9
El Salvador (UPI)	5
Europe (Eurochart Hot 100)	33
Europe (European Dance Radio)	25
Europe (European Hit Radio)	39
Finland (IFPI)	15
France (SNEP)	35
Germany (GfK)	17
Lithuania (M-1)	12
Netherlands (Dutch Top 40)	20
Netherlands (Single Top 100)	24
Quebec (ADISQ)	39
Switzerland (Schweizer Hitparade)	13

Chart (2026)	Peak position
Poland (Polish Airplay Top 100)	70

=== Year-end charts ===
Chart (1995)	Position
Belgium (Ultratop 50 Flanders)	83
Brazil (Crowley))	68
Germany (Media Control)	71
Netherlands (Dutch Top 40)	170
Switzerland (Schweizer Hitparade)	46

== Certifications ==
Region	Certification	Certified units/sales
Germany (BVMI)	Gold	250,000^{^}
^{^} Shipments figures based on certification alone.
