= Saade Vol. 1 =

Studio album by Eric Saade
- Released: 29 June 2011
- Recorded: 2011
- Genre: Electropop; pop; Europop
- Length: 43:45
- Label: Roxy
- Producer: Jason Gill; Cutfather; Daniel Davidsen; Peter Boström; Fredrik Thomander

Eric Saade chronology
Masquerade (2010)	Saade Vol. 1 (2011)	Saade Vol. 2 (2011)

Singles from Saade Vol. 1
- 1. "Popular" Released: 28 February 2011; 2. "Hearts in the Air" Released: 3 June 2011

Saade Vol. 1 is the second studio album by Swedish singer Eric Saade. It was released on 29 June 2011 by Roxy Recordings. After the Europe-wide success of his Eurovision 2011 entry "Popular", which brought Sweden its best result at the competition since 1999, Saade announced that his next album would be bipartite, divided into Saade Vol. 1 and Saade Vol. 2 (2011).

The album has spawned two singles and one promotional single. The first official single from the album, "Popular" was released on 28 February 2011 as his entry to Melodifestivalen 2011 and Eurovision 2011, where he finished at the third place. The song peaked at number one in Sweden as well as reaching top 40 in Finland, Belgium, Ireland, and charting in the United Kingdom. "Hearts in the Air" was released as the second single from the album on 3 June 2011. The song features Swedish musician J-Son and peaked at number two in Sweden. The promotional single, "Still Loving It" was released on 14 January 2011. To promote the album and Saade Vol. 2, Saade embarked on the nationwide tour, Made of Pop Concert, from June 2011.

Commercially, the album was a success, becoming Saade's first number one album in Sweden and ranked as the third best-selling album of 2011 in the country. It also charted at number sixteen in Finland.

== Background ==
In May 2011, it was revealed that Eric Saade would release his upcoming album Saade in two parts. As the reason for this, Saade said: "I didn't wanna waste too many songs on one album, so I decided to do two parts of my Album Saade. We have been working day and night with the sounds, to be correct and find the right synths etc. I just felt that I'm in a great songwriting mood, so I had to release two parts because of all these songs." To do this step, he was inspired by Robyn who released her album Body Talk in three parts.

From 16 to 27 June 2011 the British website scandipop.co.uk released previews of the songs.

== Promotion ==
=== Tour ===
In June 2011 Saade embarked on the Made of Pop Concert, his second nationwide tour in support of the albums, Saade Vol. 1 and Saade Vol. 2 (2011). The tour began with the performance at the Liseberg in Gothenburg, Sweden, and included the performance in Paris, France.

=== Singles ===
"Popular" was released on 28 November 2011 as the first single from Saade Vol. 1. He performed the songs at the Melodifestivalen 2011, where he finish at the first place, and subsequently he won the third place at the Eurovision 2011. This was the best result for Sweden since 1999, when Charlotte Perrelli won the competition with her entry "Take Me to Your Heaven". "Popular" debuted atop on the Swedish Sverigetopplistan, where it stayed for non-consecutive five weeks. It also reached top forty in Finland, Belgium, Ireland, and Austria, and peaked at number seventy-six in the United Kingdom. The song has been certified double platinum by the Swedish Recording Industry Association (GLF).

"Hearts in the Air" was released on 3 June 2011 as the second single from the album. The song features Swedish rapper J-Son and has been certified gold in Sweden. It was a commercial success in Sweden, peaking at number two. It also managed to chart in Russia and Ukraine.

==== Promotional single ====
"Still Loving It" was released as the sole promotional single from the album, on 14 January 2011.

== Awards, nominations, and certifications ==
The album won a Scandipop Award 2011 in the category Best Male Album.

As of August 2011, Saade Vol. 1 has been shipped over 40.000 copies and received Platinum in Sweden. As of November 2011, the album has been sold over 55.000 copies there.

== Track listing ==
CD, digital download
No.	Title	Writer(s)	Producer(s)	Length
1.	"Timeless"	Eric Saade; Jason Gill; Robin Fredriksson; Mattias Larsson	Gill	3:50
2.	"Hearts in the Air" (featuring J-Son)	Julimar Santos; Saade; Gill; Fredriksson; Larsson	Gill	3:58
3.	"Me and My Radio"	Brandon Beal; Daniel Davidsen; Engelina Larsen; Gill; Mich Hansen; Remee	Gill; Cutfather; Davidsen	3:56
4.	"Made of Pop"	Saade; Gill; Fredriksson; Larsson	Gill	3:25
5.	"Popular" (Remix)	Fredrik Kempe	Peter Boström	3:08
6.	"Someone New"	Fredrik Thomander; Jörgen Elofsson	Thomander	3:37
7.	"Killed by a Cop"	Saade; Santos; Gill; Fredriksson	Gill	4:15
8.	"Big Love"	Kempe; Thomander; Elofsson	Gill	3:37
9.	"Stupid With You"	Saade; Kempe; Gill; Fredriksson	Gill	3:50
10.	"Echo"	Saade; Gill; Fredriksson; Larsson	Gill	3:24

Bonus tracks
No.	Title	Writer(s)	Producer(s)	Length
11.	"Still Loving It"	Anton Malmberg Hård af Segerstad; Saade; Niclas Lundin	Gill	3:45
12.	"Popular"	Kempe	Boström	3:00
Total length:				43:45

== Personnel ==
Credits adapted from the liner notes of Saade Vol. 1.

=== Vocals ===
- Eric Saade – vocals (all tracks)
- J-Son - guest vocals (2)
- Jason Gill – backing vocals (1–4, 7–10)
- Emil Heiling - backing vocals (5, 12)
- Jeanette Olsson - backing vocals (5, 12)
- Drew Ryan Scott - backing vocals (6)
- Fredrik Thomander - backing vocals (6)

=== Instrumentation ===
- Peter Boström - bass, drums (5, 12)
- Fredrik Thomander - bass, guitar, keyboards (6)
- David Bukovinszky - cello (6)
- Mattias Johansson - violin (6)
- Aron Mellergårdh - drums (11)
- Calle Stålenbring - guitar (11)
- Anton Hård af Segerstad - keyboards (11), drums (11)

=== Production ===
- Jason Gill - production (1–4, 7–11)
- Cutfather - production (3)
- Daniel Davidsen - production (3)
- Peter Boström - production (5, 12)
- Anton Hård af Segerstad - production (5)
- Fredrik Thomander - production (6)

=== Technical ===
- Jason Gill - programming (1–4, 7–10), recording engineer (1–4, 7–11)
- Björn Engelmann - mastering (1–11)
- Erik Broheden - mastering (12)
- Henrik Edenhed - mixing (1–4, 7–11)
- Anton Malmberg Hård af Segerstad - mixing (5), programming (5)
- Fredrik Thomander - strings arrange (6), mixing (6), recording engineer (6)
- Mattias Bylund - strings arrange (6), editing (6), recording engineer (6)
- Peter Boström - mixing (12)

=== Design ===
- Mikael Eriksson - design
- Linus Hallsénius - photograph

== Charts ==
=== Weekly charts ===
Chart (2011)	Peak position
Finnish Albums (Suomen virallinen lista)	16
Swedish Albums (Sverigetopplistan)	1

=== Year-end charts ===
Chart (2011)	Position
Swedish Albums (Sverigetopplistan)	3

== Certifications ==
Certifications for Saade Vol 1
Region	Certification	Certified units/sales
Sweden (GLF)	Platinum	40,000^{‡}
^{‡} Sales+streaming figures based on certification alone.

== Release history ==
Country	Date	Format	Label
Sweden	29 June 2011	CD single, digital download	Roxy Recordings
Norway	29 June 2011	CD single, digital download	Roxy Recordings
