= Celebration (DJ BoBo album) =

Compilation album by DJ BoBo
- Released: 2002
- Genre: Eurodance
- Length: 59:55
- Label: BMG
- Producer: René Baumann

DJ BoBo chronology
Planet Colors (2001)	Celebration (2002)	Visions (2003)

Professional ratings
Review scores
Source	Rating
Allmusic	link

Celebration is a compilation album by Swiss singer DJ BoBo, released in 2002.

== Track listing ==
1. Celebration
2. Somebody Dance With Me 2002
3. Everybody (feat. Emilia)
4. Tell Me Why (feat. Gölä)
5. Where Is Your Love (feat. No Angels)
6. Pray 2002
7. Love of My Life (feat. Melanie Thornton)
8. Together (feat. ATC)
9. There Is a Party 2002
10. Freedom 2002
11. Love Is the Price (Spanglish Version)
12. Respect Yourself 2002
13. What a Feeling (feat. Irene Cara)
14. It's My Life
15. Lonely 4 You (feat. Tone)
16. Let the Dream Come True 2002
17. Around the World
18. Wonderful Day
19. Shadows of the Night (feat. Vienna Symphonic Orchestra Project)

=== Bonus disc ===
1. Colors of Life (Pure Mix)
2. Take Control (New Version)
3. Radio Ga Ga
4. Celebrate (Latin Version)
5. Come Take My Hand (The New Atlantis Version)
6. Love Is All Around (UK Radio Version)
7. Lies (Video Version)
8. Keep On Dancing (New Version)
9. I'll Be There (Single Version from Spain)
10. Hard to Say I'm Sorry (Video Version)
11. Nightfly
12. B&B Megamix
13. Bonus Multimedia Track

== Charts ==
=== Weekly charts ===
Chart (2002)	Peak position
Austrian Albums (Ö3 Austria)	18
German Albums (Offizielle Top 100)	4
Hungarian Albums (MAHASZ)	35
Swiss Albums (Schweizer Hitparade)	2

=== Year-end charts ===
Chart (2002)	Position
German Albums (Offizielle Top 100)	86
Swiss Albums (Schweizer Hitparade)	46
