= Pray (DJ BoBo song) =

Single by DJ BoBo

from the album World in Motion
- Released: September 2, 1996
- Genre: Eurodance; gospel
- Length: 3:50
- Label: EAMS; EMI; Yes Music; ZYX Music
- Songwriters: Alex Trime; Axel Breitung; René Baumann; Sven Delgado Jordan
- Producer: René Baumann

DJ BoBo singles chronology
"Love Is the Price" (1996)	"Pray" (1996)	"Respect Yourself" (1996)

Music video
- "Pray" on YouTube

"Pray" is a song by Swiss artist DJ BoBo, released in September 1996 via various labels as the lead single from his third album, World in Motion (1996). It was co-written and produced by the artist, featuring vocals by American singers Lori Glori and Jocelyn Brown, and the choir United Spirits. Successful in Europe, the single peaked at number two in both Finland and Switzerland, and was a top-5 hit also in Germany and Hungary, while in Austria, it peaked at number six. On the Eurochart Hot 100, it reached number 13 in October 1996. "Pray" received a gold certification in Germany, after 250,000 singles were sold there. The accompanying music video was directed by Bernd-Peter Rothfuss and filmed in Germany.

== Critical reception ==
Pan-European magazine Music & Media wrote, "An excellent combination of a fast radio friendly beat, Eurodance raps and an impressive gospel choir. It's already doing well in the GSA [Germany-Switzerland-Austria] countries, but this should charm EHR programmers everywhere."

== Music video ==
The music video was directed by Bernd-Peter Rothfuss and shot in autumn of 1996. It was filmed in Leipzig, Germany, during the World in Motion Tour and produced by TV-Studios Leonberg GmbH.

== Track listing ==
- CD single, Germany
1. "Pray" (Radio Version) — 3:53
2. "Pray" (Wicked Clu's House Mix) — 3:28
- CD maxi, Germany
1. "Pray" (Radio Version) — 3:50
2. "Pray" (B&B Remix) — 5:53
3. "Pray" (Love to Infinity's Classic Paradise Mix) — 7:25
4. "Pray" (Wicked Clu's House Mix) — 3:27

== Charts ==
=== Weekly charts ===
Chart (1996)	Peak position
Austria (Ö3 Austria Top 40)	6
Belgium (Ultratop 50 Flanders)	15
Europe (Eurochart Hot 100)	13
Finland (Suomen virallinen lista)	2
Germany (GfK)	3
Hungary (Mahasz)	5
Israel (Israeli Singles Chart)	5
Netherlands (Dutch Top 40 Tipparade)	11
Netherlands (Dutch Single Tip)	7
Switzerland (Schweizer Hitparade)	2

=== Year-end charts ===
Chart (1996)	Position
Austria (Ö3 Austria Top 40)	38
Europe (Eurochart Hot 100)	79
Germany (Media Control)	38
Switzerland (Schweizer Hitparade)	26

== Certifications ==
Region	Certification	Certified units/sales
Germany (BVMI)	Gold	250,000^{^}
^{^} Shipments figures based on certification alone.
