= Somebody Dance with Me =

1992 single by DJ BoBo

"Somebody Dance With Me"

Single by DJ BoBo

from the album Dance with Me
- Released: November 1992
- Length: 3:31
- Label: Fresh
- Songwriters: Rockwell; DJ BoBo; Daniel Peyer; Kurt Burger
- Producers: Gutze Gautschi; Mark Wyss; DJ Bobo; Joe Wuest; Axel Breitung

DJ BoBo singles chronology
| "Let's Groove On" (1991) | "Somebody Dance With Me" (1992) | "Keep on Dancing" (1993) |

Music video
- "Somebody Dance with Me" on YouTube

"Somebody Dance with Me" is a song by Swiss artist DJ BoBo featuring Emel Aykanat. It was released in November 1992 by label Fresh as the second single from his debut album, Dance with Me (1993). The song is on some parts based on sampling taken from "Somebody's Watching Me" by American singer Rockwell from 1983. It was the first major hit of DJ BoBo in Europe in 1992–1993, reaching the top of Swiss Hitparade, the official Swiss Singles Chart, as well as topping the charts in Portugal and Sweden.

== Chart performance ==
"Somebody Dance with Me" was a hit on the charts in Europe, Israel, and Australia. It remains one of DJ BoBo's most successful songs, peaking at number-one in Portugal, Sweden and Switzerland. In the latter nation, it also managed to top the Swiss year-end chart, after spending one week at number-one on 14 March 1993 and twenty weeks in total within the top 10 on the Schweizer Hitparade from 21 February to 12 September same year. In Sweden, the single also peaked at number one for one week, at 16 June 1993, and spent seven weeks inside the Sverigetopplistan top 10.

"Somebody Dance with Me" entered the top 10 also in Austria (3), Finland (5), Germany (4), Norway (3) and the Netherlands (3). Additionally, it was a top-20 hit in Australia (13) and Denmark (14), as well as on the Eurochart Hot 100, where it peaked at number 11 in September 1993. On the European Dance Radio Chart, the song reached number 14. It didn't chart on the UK Singles Chart in the UK or in the US, but reached number 45 on the UK Club Chart.

It earned a gold record in Germany, Australia and Israel.

== Music video ==
A very low budget music video for "Somebody Dance with Me" was shot entirely in a music venue with an audience and a performance of the song with various dancers. According to DJ BoBo, the video was shot on a budget of 3,000 Swiss Francs only. An official video from one of DJ BoBo's concerts, where the singer performs "Somebody Dance with Me" on stage was later made available on DJ BoBo's official YouTube channel in 2009, having generated more than 39 million views as of early 2025.

== Track listings ==
- 12" single, Switzerland (FM 1025)
1. "Somebody Dance with Me"
2. "Uh-Uh"
- CD single
1. "Somebody Dance with Me" (radio mix)
2. "Somebody Dance with Me" (club mix)
3. "Uh-Uh!" (Deejay remix)
4. "Somebody Dance with Me" (Live In Switzerland)
- CD maxi (Fresh 1240)
1. "Somebody Dance with Me" (remix)
2. "Move Your Feet"
3. "Somebody Dance with Me" (Live In Switzerland)
- CD maxi - Remixes, Italy (DWA 0097)
1. "Somebody Dance with Me" (Heaven Trouble remix)
2. "Somebody Dance with Me" (radio mix)
3. "Somebody Dance with Me" (club mix)
4. "Uh-Uh! (Deejay remix)"
5. "Somebody Dance with Me" (Live In Switzerland)

== Charts ==
=== Weekly charts ===
| Chart (1993–1994) | Peak position |
|---|---|
| Australia (ARIA) | 13 |
| Austria (Ö3 Austria Top 40) | 3 |
| Belgium (Ultratop 50 Flanders) | 32 |
| Denmark (IFPI) | 14 |
| Europe (Eurochart Hot 100) | 11 |
| Europe (European Dance Radio) | 14 |
| Finland (Suomen virallinen lista) | 5 |
| Germany (GfK) | 4 |
| Israel (Israeli Singles Chart) | 4 |
| Norway (VG-lista) | 3 |
| Netherlands (Dutch Top 40) | 4 |
| Netherlands (Single Top 100) | 3 |
| Portugal (AFP) | 1 |
| Sweden (Sverigetopplistan) | 1 |
| Switzerland (Schweizer Hitparade) | 1 |
| UK Club Chart (Music Week) | 45 |

=== Year-end charts ===
| Chart (1993) | Position |
|---|---|
| Australia (ARIA) | 86 |
| Austria (Ö3 Austria Top 40) | 19 |
| Europe (Eurochart Hot 100) | 23 |
| Germany (Media Control) | 14 |
| Netherlands (Dutch Top 40) | 36 |
| Netherlands (Single Top 100) | 36 |
| Sweden (Topplistan) | 16 |
| Switzerland (Schweizer Hitparade) | 1 |

| Chart (1994) | Position |
|---|---|
| Australia (ARIA) | 55 |

== Certifications ==
| Region | Certification | Certified units/sales |
|---|---|---|
| Germany (BVMI) | Gold | 250,000^{^} |
^{^} Shipments figures based on certification alone.

== Remady 2013 Mix ==
"Somebody Dance With Me (Remady 2013 Mix)"

Single by Remady and DJ BoBo featuring Manu-L
- Released: Spring 2013
- Recorded: 2012
- Genre: Electro house
- Length: 4:40 (album version); 3:56 (radio edit with rap); 3:04 (radio edit without rap)
- Label: LW Records
- Songwriters: Kennedy Gordy (aka Rockwell); René Bauman (aka DJ Bobo); Daniel Peyer; Kurt Burger

Remady singles chronology
| "It′s So Easy" (2013) | "Somebody Dance With Me (Remady 2013 Mix)" (2013) | "Holidays" (2013) |

DJ BoBo singles chronology
| "La Vida Es (Una Flor)" (2012) | "Somebody Dance with Me (Remady 2013 Remix)" (2013) |

Manu-L singles chronology
| "Somebody Dance with Me (Remady 2013 Remix)" (2013) | "Cop That Disc" (2003) |

Music video
- "Somebody Dance with Me (Remady 2013 Remix)" on YouTube

In 2013, Swiss music producer Remady released a remix of the song entitled "Somebody Dance with Me (Remady 2013 Remix)" by DJ BoBo featuring Manu-L. The track is also known as "Somebody Dance with Me 2k13" and was meant to coincide with the 20th anniversary of the hit by DJ Bobo that made the charts in 1993. The single peaked at number four in Switzerland.

=== Music video ===
The music video directed by Combo Entertainment starts with DJ BoBo in disguise with a hooded sports jacket playing the original hit on his cassette recorder while passing in front of a wall graffiti inscribed with the year 1993. Shifting the recorder by his foot, an adjacent graffiti is revealed showing 2013.

Later on in the video, youth are shown doing dance, breakdance and sports routines in front of the wall now inscribed with both years, with 2013 pointing to 1993. At the end of the video, DJ Bobo is parting with a smile from the graffiti wall while taking off his hood to the camera.

The rest of the video is actual footage from the recording sessions in the studio showing Remady, DJ Bobo and Manu-L.

=== Charts ===
| Chart (2013) | Peak position |
|---|---|
| Switzerland (Schweizer Hitparade) | 4 |
