= Love Is the Price =

Single by DJ BoBo

from the album Just for You
- B-side: "Can You See the Light"; "Let's Come Together"
- Released: January 1996
- Genre: Eurodance
- Length: 3:29
- Label: EAMS; ZYX Music; CNR Music; Do It Music; Fresh Music; Scandinavian Records; Yes Music
- Songwriters: Morrison Long; Steven Levis
- Producer: René Baumann

DJ BoBo singles chronology
"Freedom" (1995)	"Love Is the Price" (1996)	"Pray" (1996)

Music video
- "Love Is the Price" on YouTube

"Love Is the Price" is a song by Swiss artist DJ BoBo, released in January 1996 by various labels as a single from his remix-album, Just for You (1995). The song was written by Morrison Long and Steven Levis, produced by DJ BoBo, and features vocals by singer Natascha Wright. It was a top-20 hit in Germany, Switzerland, Finland and Austria, peaking at numbers 11, 12 and 13, while on the Eurochart Hot 100, it reached number 28 in February 1996. The accompanying music video was filmed in Stuttgart, Germany.

== Critical reception ==
Pan-European magazine Music & Media praised the song as "great" and "mellow", and compared it to the work of American rapper LL Cool J. The reviewer added, "Female vocals take over the chorus to add a little extra variety. A great EHR candidate, but mellow enough for ACE [Adult Contemporary Europe] too."

== Track listing ==
- 12", Germany
1. "Love Is the Price" (B&B Remix) — 4:18
2. "Love Is the Price" (Radio Version) — 3:29
3. "Can You See the Light" — 4:32
4. "Love Is the Price" (Steven Levis Mix) — 3:23
5. "Let's Come Together" — 3:44
- CD maxi, Europe
1. "Love Is the Price" (Radio Version) — 3:29
2. "Love Is the Price" (B&B Remix) — 4:18
3. "Love Is the Price" (Steven Levis Mix) — 3:23
4. "Can You See the Light" — 4:32
5. "Let's Come Together" — 3:44

== Charts ==
=== Weekly charts ===
Chart (1996)	Peak position
Austria (Ö3 Austria Top 40)	13
Europe (Eurochart Hot 100)	28
Finland (Suomen virallinen lista)	12
Germany (GfK)	11
Switzerland (Schweizer Hitparade)	11

=== Year-end charts ===
Chart (1996)	Position
Germany (Media Control)	86
Switzerland (Schweizer Hitparade)	53
