= Fight Hunger =

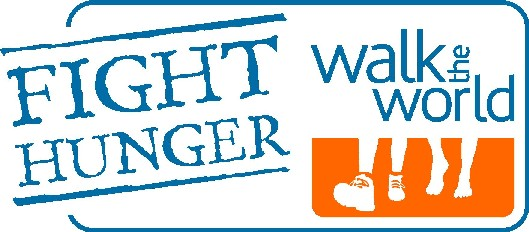
Logo of the Fight Hunger: Walk the World campaign

Fight Hunger was a global initiative based in Rome, Italy, that called for the end of child hunger by 2015. It was organised by the World Food Programme and its partners. Fight Hunger is closely linked with the UN Millennium Development Goals, most specifically Goal #1: to halve the number of people suffering from poverty and hunger by 2015. There were almost 870 million hungry people in the world in 2010–2012, many of them children.

Fight Hunger also claimed that every time a site visitor clicked the Click to Feed a Child link, sponsors donated US$0.19 to the UN World Food Programme, providing one meal to a child.

The most significant event of Fight Hunger was Walk the World, a global day of advocacy and fundraising. On 21 May 2006, more than 760,000 people walked in 420 locations in 118 different countries to call for the end of child hunger. Walk the World was first held in 2003.
