= Let the Dream Come True =

1994 single by DJ BoBo

Single by DJ BoBo

from the album There Is a Party
- Released: 1 September 1994
- Genre: Eurodance
- Length: 3:58
- Label: Fresh
- Songwriters: René Baumann; Axel Breitung; Kurt Burger
- Producers: René Baumann; Axel Breitung

DJ BoBo singles chronology
"Everybody" (1994)	"Let the Dream Come True" (1994)	"Love Is All Around" (1995)

Music video
- "Let the Dream Come True" on YouTube

"Let the Dream Come True" is a song by Swiss Eurodance artist DJ BoBo, released in September 1994 via various European labels as the lead single from the artist's second album, There Is a Party (1994). The song features American singer Lori Glori (aka Lori Hölzel) and achieved success on the charts in Europe. It became a number-one hit in both Finland and Switzerland, and a top-10 hit in Germany, Austria and Lithuania. On the Eurochart Hot 100, the song peaked at number nine in November 1994. Outside Europe, it reached number 15 in Israel, number 28 on the RPM Dance/Urban chart in Canada and number 49 in Australia. The single was certified Gold in Germany.

== Critical reception ==
Pan-European magazine Music & Media commented, "More of the same or...? Well, 'Let the Dream Come True' continues the Euro style of the Swiss DJ's previous hits."

== Music video ==
The accompanying music video for "Let the Dream Come True" was directed by Frank Paul Husmann-Labusga. It was filmed in New York City. The video was A-listed on Germany's VIVA in November 1994. Husmann-Labusga would also go on directing the videos for "Freedom" and "There Is a Party".

=== Synopsis ===
In the video, we follow a story about an unemployed mother and her little son. In a shop in the city that has a vacancy, the mother goes in while the boy waits outside. But when she comes out again, the boy is gone. He has lost his way in the big city, but is found by a man in a limousine. While the mother walks around the city, desperately looking for her son, the two drive around looking for her. At a park, they get out of the limousine and walk into the park. They stop by at a performance. There the boy sees his mother in the audience and runs into her arms. Radiant with joy, they look at the man smiling at them before the video ends. In between this story, DJ BoBo performs the song with his dancer in and around an empty old factory building.

== Track listings ==
- 12-inch, Spain (1994)

A1: "Let the Dream Come True" (Club Mix) – 6:09
A2: "Let the Dream Come True" (Radio Mix) – 3:58
B1: "Let the Dream Come True" (Live On Planet Earth Mix) – 6:35
B2: "Let the Dream Come True" (Special Edition) – 3:38

- CD single, France (1994)
1. "Let the Dream Come True" (Radio Mix) – 3:58
2. "Let the Dream Come True" (Live On Planet Earth Mix) – 6:3
- CD maxi, Europe (1994)
1. "Let the Dream Come True" (Radio Mix) – 3:58
2. "Let the Dream Come True" (Live On Planet Earth Mix) – 6:35
3. "Let the Dream Come True" (Club Mix) – 6:09

== Charts ==
=== Weekly charts ===
Chart (1994–1995)	Peak position
Australia (ARIA)	49
Austria (Ö3 Austria Top 40)	6
Belgium (Ultratop 50 Flanders)	19
Belgium (VRT Top 30 Flanders)	15
Canada Dance/Urban (RPM)	28
Europe (Eurochart Hot 100)	9
Europe (European Dance Radio)	4
Finland (Suomen virallinen lista)	1
Germany (GfK)	4
Israel (Israeli Singles Chart)	15
Lithuania (M-1)	9
Netherlands (Dutch Top 40)	13
Netherlands (Single Top 100)	11
Sweden (Sverigetopplistan)	11
Switzerland (Schweizer Hitparade)	1

=== Year-end charts ===
Chart (1994)	Position
Europe (Eurochart Hot 100)	74
Germany (Media Control)	62
Netherlands (Dutch Top 40)	112
Netherlands (Single Top 100)	82
Switzerland (Schweizer Hitparade)	42
