= There Is a Party =

Studio album by DJ BoBo
- Released: 21 October 1994
- Recorded: 1993
- Studios: Bishop Studios, Hamburg
- Genre: Eurodance
- Labels: Fresh; Metrovynil; EAMS (Germany); Echo (Austria)
- Producer: Rene Baumann

DJ BoBo chronology
Dance with Me (1993)	There Is a Party (1994)	World in Motion (1996)

There Is a Party is the second studio album released by the Swiss singer-songwriter DJ BoBo. It was released on 21 October 1994 through the Fresh Music, Metrovynil as well as EAMS Lesser record labels on compact disc, 12-inch gramophone record and cassette tape formats. The album, which belongs to the musical genre of electronic music, was later re-released in 1995 via BMG Records and enjoyed massive commercial success worldwide.

== Critical reception ==
Pan-European magazine Music & Media wrote: "More of the same or...? Well, Let The Dream Come True continues the Euro style of the Swiss DJ's previous hits. Most of the set here is made according to that winning formula, whereby Freedom is a gambler's best bet. A truly new musical direction is distinct by the reggae-tinged title track. We hear a guitar and it's like the Boney M girls are looking over Bobo's shoulders. One key to Euro's future is in Bobo's hands."

== Track listing ==
№	Title	Writers
1	Technology	Rene Baumann, Axel Breitung
2	Let the Dream Come True	Rene Baumann, Axel Breitung, Kurt Burger
3	There is a Party	Rene Baumann, Axel Breitung
4	Everything Has Changed	Rene Baumann, Axel Breitung
5	Freedom	Alex Trime, Sven Delgado Jordan, Rene Baumann
6	Give Yourself a Chance	Rene Baumann, Axel Breitung
7	What About My Broken Heart	Morrison Long, Rene Baumann, Axel Breitung
8	I Know What I Want	Rene Baumann, Axel Breitung
9	I Feel It	Rene Baumann, Axel Breitung
10	Love is All Around	Morrison Long, Rene Baumann, Axel Breitung
11	You Belong to Me	Rene Baumann, Axel Breitung, Kurt Burger
12	Deep in the Jungle	Rene Baumann, Axel Breitung
13	Too Many Nights	Morrison Long, Rene Baumann, Axel Breitung
14	There's a Paradise	Rene Baumann, Axel Breitung

== Charts ==
=== Weekly charts ===
Chart (1994–95)	Peak position
Austrian Albums (Ö3 Austria)	17
German Albums (Offizielle Top 100)	9
Swedish Albums (Sverigetopplistan)	41
Swiss Albums (Schweizer Hitparade)	4

=== Year-end charts ===
Chart (1995)	Position
German Albums (Offizielle Top 100)	78

== Certifications ==
Region	Certification	Certified units/sales
Germany (BVMI)	Gold	250,000^{^}
Switzerland (IFPI Switzerland)	Platinum	50,000^{^}
^{^} Shipments figures based on certification alone.
