= Remady =

- Also known as: Player & Remady (P&R)
- Born: Marc Würgler; December 12, 1977 (age 48)
- Origin: Zurich, Switzerland
- Genres: House, electro house, UK garage
- Years active: 1998–present
- Labels: Phonag Records, Happy Music (FR)
- Member of: Remady & Manu-L
- Website: https://www.remady.ch/

Marc Würgler (German pronunciation: [ˈmaʁk ˈvʏʁɡlɐ]; born on 12 December 1977), better known by his stage name Remady, is a Swiss music producer from Zürich.

He started under the name Player & Remady and was also known as Remady P&R. He was later called simply Remady, and under that name, he achieved his first commercially successful album, No Superstar (The Album), which featured the singles "Give Me a Sign" (which earned him an NRJ music award), "Save Your Heart", "No Superstar" and "Do It on My Own". He collaborated extensively with Manu-L before forming the duo Remady & Manu-L.

== Discography ==
=== Albums ===
==== Studio albums ====
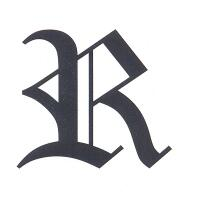
Logo

List of albums, with selected chart positions and certifications
Title	Album details	Peak chart positions						Certifications
Title	Album details	AUS	FRA	NLD	NZ	SWI	UK	Certifications
No Superstar	Released: 27 August 2010; Label: Houseworks, Phonag Records; Formats: CD, digital download	—	60	—	—	6	—	
The Original	Released: 22 March 2012; Label: Phonag Records; Formats: CD, digital download	—	—	—	—	5	—	
1+1=3	Released: 1 Mai 2015; Label: Phonag Records; Formats: CD, digital download	—	—	—	—	7	—	
"—" denotes an album that did not chart or was not released in that territory.

=== Singles ===
List of singles as lead artist, with selected chart positions and certifications, showing year released and album name
Single	Year	Peak chart positions						Certifications	Album
Single	Year	AUS	FRA	IRE	SWE	SWI	UK	Certifications	Album
"No Superstar"	2010	—	8	—	—	5	—		No Superstar
"Give Me a Sign"	2010	—	11	—	—	11	—		No Superstar
"Do It on My Own" (featuring Craig David)	2010	—	12	—	—	28	—		No Superstar
"Save Your Heart"	2011	—	38	—	—	41	—		No Superstar
"The Way We Are"	2011	—	60	—	—	30	—		The Original
"Single Ladies" (featuring J-Son)	2012	—	83	—	—	1	—		The Original
"Doing It Right" (featuring Amanda Wilson)	2012	—	—	—	—	15	—		The Original
"—" denotes a single that did not chart or was not released in that territory.
