= Love Is All Around (DJ BoBo song) =

1995 single by DJ BoBo

Single by DJ BoBo

from the album There Is a Party
- B-side: "Bring the Beat Back"
- Released: 23 January 1995
- Genre: Eurodance
- Length: 4:04
- Label: EAMS
- Songwriters: René Baumann; Axel Breitung; Morrison Long
- Producer: René Baumann

DJ BoBo singles chronology
"Let the Dream Come True" (1994)	"Love Is All Around" (1995)	"There Is a Party" (1995)

Music video
- "Love Is All Around" on YouTube

"Love Is All Around" is a song by Swiss singer-songwriter DJ BoBo, released on 23 January 1995, by label EAMS, as the second single from his second album, There Is a Party (1994). It features vocals by singer Christiane Lupp (also known as Christiane Eiben) and is co-written by BoBo with Axel Breitung and Morrison Long and produced by BoBo. The song reached number one on the dance chart in Canada. In Europe, it peaked within the top 10 in Finland and Germany, being certified gold in the latter country. The accompanying music video was filmed in New York City and directed by Frank Paul Husmann.

== Chart performance ==
"Love Is All Around" entered the top 10 in both Finland and Germany, peaking at number seven and 10, respectively. The single was also a top-20 hit in Austria (13), Belgium (18), Denmark (17), Norway (17), Spain (12), Sweden (14) and Switzerland (16), as well as on the Eurochart Hot 100, where it hit number 17 in February 1995. In the United Kingdom, it was one of only three songs by DJ BoBo to chart there, peaking at number 49 in its first week on the UK Singles Chart, on 11 June 1995. On the UK Dance Singles Chart, "Love Is All Around" was a bigger hit, reaching number 20. Outside Europe, it peaked at number-one on the RPM Dance/Urban chart in Canada and number 24 in Australia. The single earned a gold record in Germany, with shipments of 250,000 units.

== Critical reception ==
Pan-European magazine Music & Media commented, "Hard to distinguish from other Euro tracks, DJ Bobo apparently prefers to hold the most different tracks from his There's a Party album for a later release on single." James Hamilton from British magazine Music Week's RM Dance Update described it as "Swiss DJ Rene Bobo Baumann's drily muttered and girls chorused cheesily galloping Euro hit (not the Troggs/Wet Wet Wet song)".

== Music video ==
The music video for "Love Is All Around" was directed by Frank Paul Husmann (as 'Husmann & Husmann') and has a sepia tone. It was filmed in New York City, depicting a story around DJ BoBo and his girlfriend intertwined with footage of various people on the streets of the city. The video was A-listed on German music television channel VIVA in March 1995. "Love Is All Around" was later made available on DJ BoBo's official YouTube channel in 2013 and had generated more than 47 million views as of late 2025.

== Track listing ==
- CD maxi – Europe
1. "Love Is All Around" (radio version) – 4:04
2. "Love Is All Around" (extended mix I) – 5:29
3. "Bring the Beat Back" – 4:39
4. "Love Is All Around" (extended mix II) – 5:06

== Charts ==
=== Weekly charts ===
Chart (1995)	Peak position
Australia (ARIA)	24
Austria (Ö3 Austria Top 40)	13
Belgium (Ultratop 50 Flanders)	18
Canada Dance/Urban (RPM)	1
Denmark (IFPI)	17
Europe (Eurochart Hot 100)	17
Europe (European Dance Radio)	24
Finland (Suomen virallinen lista)	7
France (SNEP)	42
Germany (GfK)	10
Netherlands (Dutch Top 40)	35
Netherlands (Single Top 100)	36
Norway (VG-lista)	17
Scotland (OCC)	34
Spain (AFYVE)	12
Sweden (Sverigetopplistan)	14
Switzerland (Schweizer Hitparade)	16
UK Singles (OCC)	49
UK Dance (OCC)	20
UK Pop Tip Club Chart (Music Week)	13

=== Year-end charts ===
Chart (1995)	Position
Canada Dance/Urban (RPM)	6
Germany (Media Control)	89
Latvia (Latvijas Top 50)	134
Sweden (Topplistan)	95

== Certifications ==
Region	Certification	Certified units/sales
Germany (BVMI)	Gold	250,000^{^}
^{^} Shipments figures based on certification alone.

== Release history ==
Region	Date	Format(s)	Label(s)	Ref.
Germany	23 January 1995	CD	EAMS	
United Kingdom	5 June 1995	12-inch vinyl; CD; cassette	Avex UK	
