= Respect Yourself (DJ BoBo song) =

Single by DJ BoBo

from the album World in Motion
- Released: 11 December 1996
- Studio: Bishop Studios
- Genre: Eurodance
- Length: 3:55
- Label: EAMS; Metrovynil; Yes Music; ZYX Music
- Songwriters: Axel Breitung; René Baumann
- Producer: René Baumann

DJ BoBo singles chronology
"Pray" (1996)	"Respect Yourself" (1996)	"It's My Life" (1997)

Music video
- "Respect Yourself" on YouTube

"Respect Yourself" is a song by Swiss artist DJ BoBo, released in December 1996 as the second single from his third album, World in Motion (1996). The song was co-written and produced by DJ BoBo, featuring vocals by American singers Lori Glori and Jocelyn Brown, and the choir United Spirits. A major hit in Europe, it was a top-10 hit in Czech Republic and Finland, peaking at numbers two and seven, respectively. Additionally, it was a top-20 hit in Switzerland, a top-30 hit in Austria and a top-40 hit in Germany. On the Eurochart Hot 100, the single reached number 52 in January 1997. DJ BoBo performed it at the World Music Awards in Monaco in April 1997. The accompanying music video was directed by Thomas Job and filmed in New York. It was produced by DoRo Wien and Thomas Wildner was behind the camera.

== Track listing ==
- 12" single, Germany (1996)
1. "Respect Yourself" (Extended Mix) — 5:40
2. "Respect Yourself" (B+B Remix) — 4:46
3. "Respect Yourself" (Rob 'N' Raz Remix) — 4:52
4. "Respect Yourself" (Radio Mix) — 3:55
- CD maxi, Germany (1996)
1. "Respect Yourself" (Radio Mix) — 3:55
2. "Respect Yourself" (B+B Remix) — 4:46
3. "Respect Yourself" (Extended Mix) — 5:40
4. "Respect Yourself" (Rob 'N' Raz Remix) — 4:52

== Charts ==
=== Weekly charts ===
Chart (1996–97)	Peak position
Austria (Ö3 Austria Top 40)	23
Czech Republic (IFPI CR)	2
Europe (Eurochart Hot 100)	52
Finland (Suomen virallinen lista)	7
Germany (GfK)	31
Latvia (Latvijas Top 50)	6
Switzerland (Schweizer Hitparade)	16

=== Year-end charts ===
Chart (1997)	Position
Latvia (Latvijas Top 50)	39
Romania (Romanian Top 100)	85
