= J-Son =

Musical artist

- Born: Julimar Santos Oliveira Nepomuceno; 27 April 1985 (age 41); Salvador, Bahia, Brazil
- Genres: Hip hop, pop
- Occupations: Rapper, singer, songwriter
- Years active: 2008-present
- Labels: Same Blood Records, Sony Music

Julimar Santos Oliveira Nepomuceno (born 27 April 1985), better known by his stage name J-Son, is a Brazilian-born Swedish rapper, singer and songwriter. He came to Göteborg, Sweden with his mother when he was 5 years old. He is signed to EMI Music Publishing.

The Brazilian-Swedish, J-Son started his career with 'Lookie Lookie' and 'Pretty Boy' 2008.

J-Son has opened acts to artists such as Fabolous, 50 Cent, Joe Budden, Lady Gaga and Musiq Soulchild.

== Discography ==
=== Albums ===
Album title	Album details	Peak chart positions
Album title	Album details	SWE
Never Half Stepping	Released: 23 November 2009; Label: Same Blood; Formats: CD, digital download	48

=== Mixtapes ===
- 2008: The Smoke Mixtape
- 2009: Same Blood Compilation (feat. Same Blood Boyz)
- 2009: European Hustle

=== Compilations ===
- 2011: Global Attack Mixtape, Vol. 2

=== Singles ===
==== As lead artist ====
Year	Single	Peak chart positions	Album
Year	Single	NLD	Album
2008	"Lookie Lookie"	—	Never Half Stepping
2008	"Pretty Boy"	—	Never Half Stepping
2009	"My Window" (featuring Yaiya)	—	Never Half Stepping
2009	"Head in the Sky"	—	Never Half Stepping
2010	"Far Away"	—	Non-album singles
2011	"Tag" (Lazee featuring Madcon and Julimar)	—	Non-album singles
2011	"Destination Sky" (featuring Jason Gill)	—	Non-album singles
2011	"Stop Me" (featuring EllyEve)	—	Non-album singles
2011	"Bonjour" (featuring Elji BeatzKilla, Lazee)	—	Non-album singles
2012	"Remedy" (featuring Salem Al Fakir)	—	Non-album singles
2012	"Mr Feelgood"	67	Non-album singles
"—" denotes single that did not chart or was not released.

==== As featured artist ====
Title	Year	Peak chart positions					Certifications	Album
Title	Year	SWE	AUT	FRA	GER	SWI	Certifications	Album
"Where You Wanna Go" (Mischa Daniels featuring J-Son)	2010	—	—	—	—	—		
"Hearts in the Air" (Eric Saade featuring J-Son)	2011	2	—	—	—	—		Saade Vol. 1
"Sky Falls Down" (Eric Saade featuring J-Son)	2011	—	—	—	—	—		Saade Vol. 2
"Simple Man" (Mischa Daniels and Sandro Monte featuring J-Son)	2011	—	—	—	—	—		
"Single Ladies" (Remady and Manu-L featuring J-Son)	2012	2	45	83	41	1		
"Dance with me" (D'Sound featuring J-Son)	2015	—	—	—	—	—		
"Bamboreea" (Inna featuring J-Son)	2015	2	—	—	—	—		INNA
"Cigarette" (Penthox featuring Madcon and Julimar Santos)	2016	—	—	—	—	—		
"—" denotes single that did not chart or was not released.
