= Noel McGrath (author) =

Australian musician, journalist and author

- Born: 1949 (age 76–77); Melbourne, Victoria, Australia
- Occupations: Musician, journalist, writer
- Writing career
- Pen name: Shane Harley
- Subjects: Rock and pop music, personal development
- Notable work: The Australian Encyclopaedia of Rock

Noel McGrath (born 1949) is an Australian musician, journalist and author, whose best known publications are The Australian Encyclopaedia of Rock (1978) and Ultimate Success (1988).

== Biography ==
Noel McGrath grew up in Mount Waverley, a suburb of Melbourne, and from the age of fourteen he played guitar. In 1963 he formed his first band, the Vampires, performing lead vocals and guitar, with John Harmer (drums), Doug Stevens (piano), Bill Stevens (guitar, bass) and Brad Thomas (saxophone). In 1965 he formed the Fugitives with Kelvin Monaghan (guitar), Chris Deutscher (drums) and Colin De Luca (bass), which was followed by the Shade in 1967 with John Sinclair (vocals), Phil Randall (drums) and John DeBoer (bass).

At the age of seventeen he adopted the stage name, Shane Harley, and joined the All Stars, a rock'n'roll band started by Stan Azzopardi and Paul Meaney, following the breakup of The Premiers. The original lineup of The Rock'n'Roll Allstars (to give the band its full name) was Paul Meaney (vocals), Stan Azzopardi (guitar), Ken Semple (saxophones), Andrew King (piano), Mick Lynch (drums)and Chas Whitling (bass). The band worked only occasionally, and mainly at "Jailhouse", a dance which frequently moved from venue to venue. Eventually, Stan, Paul and Ken left The Rock'n'Roll Allstars to form The Paul McKay Sound. The new lineup of the Allstars included Allan Sterling (keyboards), Penny Parsons (vocals), Wayne Duncan (bass), and Eddie Chappell (drums). They recorded a single with cover versions of "Come Dance with Me"/"Will You Love Me Tomorrow", on the Festival Label.

After completing year 12 he enrolled at Swinburne Institute of Technology where he graduated with a Degree of Business Studies. During this period he continued to perform with a variety of pop, rock bands, including the Shane Harley Trio, Grand Slam and the Paul McKay Sound.

In October 1978 his first commercially successful book, The Australian Encyclopaedia of Rock, was published by Outback Press. His first book led to a career in radio (Gold FM, KIIS FM and 3MP) and television (Peter Couchman Show on the Ten Network) as a rock historian. This was followed by Australian Encyclopaedia of Rock 1978-79 Yearbook (1979) and Australian Encyclopaedia of Rock & Pop (1984). Andrew Ferrington of The Canberra Times described the second edition, which "lists every Australian band and performer who recorded songs that reached the national top-40 singles or top-20 albums charts... The listings are thorough and faultless, as far as I can ascertain, but like Glenn A. Baker's book, this book falls into the 'catalogue' variety of literature on the subject."

McGrath worked as a Communications Manager for the Australian Bicentennial Authority between 1986 and 1989. In November 1988 he released, Ultimate Success on Paradise Publications, a change of direction from music to the field of personal development. It provided McGrath with his second top-ten best-seller peaking at number six on the charts. From 1990 to 2010 he released a number of books on personal development, including Happiness Principle (1989), Respect Yourself (1990), Journey into the Mind (1991), Cosmic Executive (1992) and Getting Younger (2003). According to The Canberra Times reviewer, in Cosmic Executive, McGrath advised that "Australian companies are too regimented and obsessed with profit. And he suggests employers give their workers fancy dress days and ice-cream hours to help improve productivity."

== Bibliography ==
- McGrath, Noel (1978). Australian Encyclopaedia of Rock. Collingwood, Victoria: Outback Press. ISBN 0-86888-216-X.
  - McGrath, Noel (1978). Noel McGrath's Australian Encyclopedia of Rock. Collingwood: Outback Press. ISBN 978-0-86888-216-1.
  - McGrath, Noel (1984). Noel McGrath's Australian Encyclopaedia of Rock & Pop (Revised ed.). Adelaide: Rigby. ISBN 978-0-7270-1909-7.
- McGrath, Noel (1979). Noel McGrath's Australian Encyclopaedia of Rock 1978–79 Yearbook. Collingwood: Outback Press. ISBN 978-0-86888-228-4.
- McGrath, Noel (1988). Noel McGrath's Ultimate Success. Melbourne: Paradise Publications. ISBN 978-0-9588079-0-6.
- McGrath, Noel; EON-FM (1988). Noel McGrath's Book of Australian Rock: The Stars, the Charts, the Stories, the Legends. Melbourne: Lothian. ISBN 978-0-85091-345-3.
- McGrath, Noel (1989). Noel McGrath's Happiness Principle. Melbourne: Paradise Publications. ISBN 978-0-9588079-1-3.
- McGrath, Noel (1990). Respect Yourself. Melbourne: Paradise Publications. ISBN 978-0-9588079-2-0.
- McGrath, Noel (1991). Journey into the Mind. Melbourne: Paradise Publications. ISBN 978-0-9588079-3-7.
- McGrath, Noel (1992). Cosmic Executive. Malvern East: Gemcraft Books. ISBN 978-0-9588079-4-4.
- McGrath, Noel (1994). Living Without Fear: the Break-Through Program to Love, Prosperity & Healthy Relationships. Glen Waverley: Byron Management. ISBN 978-0-646-39637-8.
- McGrath, Noel (1996). Noel McGrath's the Perfect You?: Removing the Barriers to Personal Perfection. Burwood Vic: Hihorse. ISBN 978-0-909223-74-8.
- McGrath, Noel (2003). Getting Younger. Glen Waverley: Byron Books. ISBN 978-0-646-41900-8.
