= Planet Colors =

Studio album by DJ BoBo
- Released: 5 February 2001
- Recorded: 2000
- Studios: Bishop Studios, Hamburg
- Label: Epic
- Producers: René Baumann; Stefan Schrupp; Frank Lio

DJ BoBo chronology
Level 6 (1999)	Planet Colors (2001)	Celebration (2002)

Planet Colors is the seventh studio album by Swiss singer DJ BoBo, released in 2001. Three singles were released from the album during the same year: "What a Feeling", "Hard to Say I'm Sorry" and "Colors of Life".

The first single from the album, "What a Feeling", features American singer Irene Cara and is a cover version of her 1983 song "Flashdance... What a Feeling". It was chosen to be on the album in an online poll on DJ BoBo's official website in May 2000, in which fans were asked which successful 1980s song they would like to be covered for his new album. The single reached No. 2 in Switzerland and No. 3 in Germany. The other two singles failed to enter the top ten in both countries.

== Track listing ==
- All songs written by DJ BoBo and Axel Brietung, except where noted.
1. "Let the Party Begin" – 4:03
2. "What a Feeling" (with Irene Cara) – 3:46 (Giorgio Moroder, Irene Cara, Keith Forsey)
3. "Hard to Say I'm Sorry" – 3:57
4. "Man in the Mirror" – 4:51
5. "Colors of Life" – 4:03
6. "Moscow" – 4:15
7. "Say It Again" – 3:54
8. "Top of the World" – 4:20
9. "Way to Your Heart" – 3:50
10. "Tell Me Why" – 3:41
11. "Dreaming of You" – 4:13
12. "Time to Turn Off the Light" – 4:44

== Personnel ==
- DJ BoBo: Vocals
- Axel Brietung: Guitars on track 2, vocals on tracks 1–5 and 7–10 (choir vocals).
- Sigi Dresen: Keyboards and piano on tracks 5, 7 and 12.
- Valery Shibayev Choir: Russian vocals on track 6.

== Charts ==
=== Weekly charts ===
Chart (2001)	Peak position
Austrian Albums (Ö3 Austria)	27
German Albums (Offizielle Top 100)	4
Hungarian Albums (MAHASZ)	33
Swiss Albums (Schweizer Hitparade)	2

=== Year-end charts ===
Chart (2001)	Position
Swiss Albums (Schweizer Hitparade)	15
