= Take Control (DJ BoBo song) =

1993 single by DJ BoBo

Single by DJ BoBo

from the album Dance with Me
- B-side: "Move Your Feet"
- Released: November 1993
- Genre: Eurodance; hi-NRG
- Length: 3:45
- Label: Fresh
- Songwriters: René Baumann; Daniel Peyer; Gutze Gautschi; Mark Wyss
- Producers: René Baumann; Gutze Gautschi; Mark Wyss

DJ BoBo singles chronology
"Keep on Dancing" (1993)	"Take Control" (1993)	"Everybody" (1994)

Music video
- "Take Control" on YouTube

"Take Control" is a song by Swiss artist DJ BoBo, released in November 1993 by Fresh label as the third single from his debut album, Dance with Me (1993). The song was both co-written and co-produced by DJ BoBo and features uncredited vocals by Christiane Lupp (also known as Christiane Eiben). It was a top-10 hit in Austria and Switzerland, peaking at numbers nine and four, respectively. In Finland, Germany and the Netherlands, the single was a top-20 hit. It also charted in Denmark and peaked at number 21 on the Eurochart Hot 100. Outside Europe, "Take Control" was successful in Israel, peaking at number two. The accompanying music video was directed by Marten Tedin and filmed in Stockholm, Sweden. It was A-listed on German music television channel VIVA in February 1994. "Take Control" received a gold certification in Germany, after 250,000 singles were sold there.

== Critical reception ==
Larry Flick from Billboard magazine wrote, "Already a household name in various parts of Europe, Swiss producer/musician/rapper stomps into U.S. consciousness with a hi-NRG jam that is often reminiscent of Culture Beat and 2 Unlimited. Although the lyrics never venture beyond the "let's boogie" mode, there is no denying that the contagious chorus and spiraling synths add up to a possible crossover smash. Mixes range from pop-friendly to more hard-edged rave."

== Track listings ==
- 12-inch, Germany
1. "Take Control" (Club Version) – 5:56
2. "Take Control" (Radio Mix) – 3:45
3. "Take Control" (Instrumental) – 5:56
- CD single, Europe
1. "Take Control" (Radio Mix) – 3:44
2. "Take Control" (Club Mix) – 5:56
- CD maxi, Switzerland
1. "Take Control" (Radio Mix) – 3:45
2. "Take Control" (Club Dance Mix) – 5:56
3. "Move Your Feet" – 3:55
4. "Take Control" (Instrumental) – 5:56
- CD maxi – Remix, Germany
1. "Take Control" (Club Mix) – 6:16
2. "Take Control" (Radio Edit) – 4:10
3. "Music" – 4:34

== Charts ==
=== Weekly charts ===
Chart (1993–1994)	Peak position
Austria (Ö3 Austria Top 40)	9
Europe (Eurochart Hot 100)	21
Finland (IFPI)	18
Germany (GfK)	12
Israel (Israeli Singles Chart)	2
Netherlands (Dutch Top 40)	25
Netherlands (Single Top 100)	18
Sweden (Sverigetopplistan)	21
Switzerland (Schweizer Hitparade)	4

=== Year-end charts ===
Chart (1994)	Position
Europe (Eurochart Hot 100)	98
Germany (Media Control)	56
Netherlands (Dutch Top 40)	197
Switzerland (Schweizer Hitparade)	27

== Certifications ==
Region	Certification	Certified units/sales
Germany (BVMI)	Gold	250,000^{^}
^{^} Shipments figures based on certification alone.
