= DJ BoBo =

Swiss singer (born 1968)

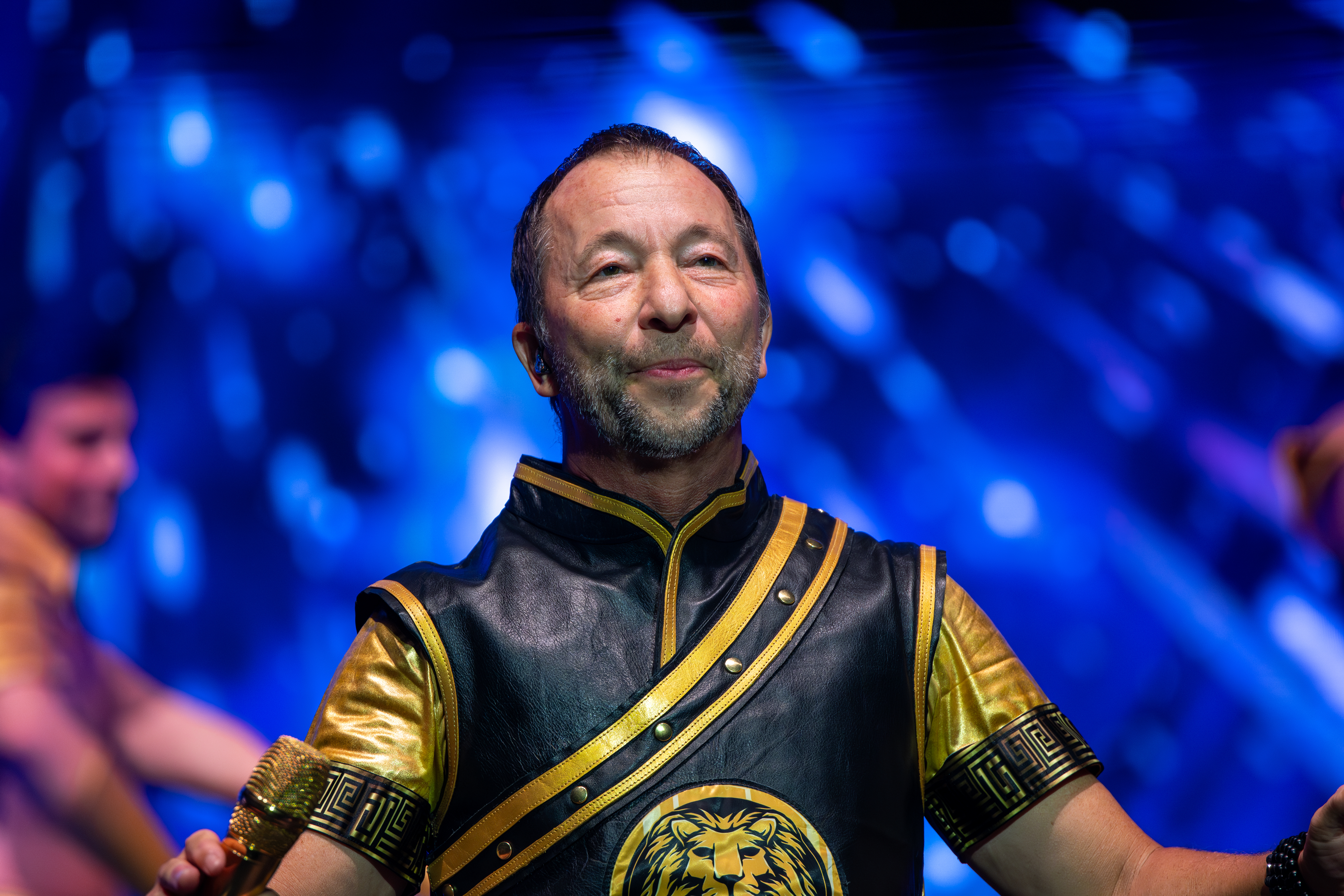
- DJ BoBo performing in 2024

Background information
- Born: Peter René Baumann; 5 January 1968 (age 58); Kölliken, Aargau, Switzerland
- Genres: Pop; electronica; house
- Occupations: Singer; songwriter; rapper; dancer; voice actor; producer
- Years active: 1989–present
- Labels: Fresh Music (1989–1993); EAMS (1994–2001); BMG (2002–2003); Yes Music (2004–present)

Peter René Baumann (born 5 January 1968), better known under his stage name DJ BoBo, is a Swiss singer, songwriter, rapper, dancer, voice actor and music producer. He has sold 14 million records worldwide and has released 12 studio albums as well as several compilation albums which have included his previous hits in a reworked format. BoBo has also released 34 singles, some of which have charted high not only in German-speaking countries, but also in other European territories.

As a dance music producer, his first big success came with the single "Somebody Dance with Me", which borrows its melody from Rockwell's "Somebody's Watching Me". BoBo charted with the singles "Keep on Dancing", "Take Control", "Everybody", "Let the Dream Come True", "Love Is All Around", "Freedom", "Pray", and "What a Feeling", as well as "Chihuahua", almost all of which comprised fast-paced Eurodance sound with female vocals and rap verses performed by BoBo.

Between 1992 and 2007, he had 27 single chart hits in Switzerland and Germany and won ten World Music Awards for being Switzerland's best-selling artist. BoBo has received numerous Gold and Platinum certifications for his releases and has found success in Europe (primarily Germany and Switzerland), Canada, Asia, and South America.

== Biography ==
=== 1985–1991: Early beginnings ===
DJ BoBo (left), 27th May 1990

Peter René Baumann was born in Kölliken, Switzerland in 1968 to Italian father Luigi Cipriano and Swiss mother Ruth Baumann. Initially, Baumann wanted to work in the area of confectionery and bakery. This, however, did not last long as his desire for dancing clicked with the development of breakdancing after his high school graduation. Having been involved in numerous dance-contests, Baumann managed to reach the Top 10 of the German dance-contest "Disco Kings" with his acrobatic dance style.

Baumann began his DJ career in 1985, a year after which he was a runner-up in the Swiss DJ Championships. He continued to work as a DJ at numerous night-clubs such as Don Paco and the Hazyland, both in Switzerland. He gained enough experience and later decided to produce his own record. His first single "I Love You" came out in late 1989 during which time he would still work as a DJ but focused on future releases of his own production. In 1991, DJ BoBo released two other singles, "Ladies in the House" and "Let's Groove On". The latter was a little more successful and even made it onto the first album.

=== 1992–1996: Career breakthrough ===
Baumann gained immense international popularity when he released his Europe-wide smash hit "Somebody Dance with Me" in November 1992. Employing catchy refrains by Emel Aykanat as well as rap performance by himself, the single shot to number 1 in Switzerland and Sweden, while it landed in the Top 5 in numerous other European countries including Germany. "Somebody Dance with Me" was certified Gold in Germany for selling well over 250,000 units. His second hit, "Keep on Dancing", which followed the same technique as its predecessor, reached the Top 5 both in Switzerland and in Germany, and landed in the Top 10 in other parts of Europe. The single reached Gold status in Germany for sales of 250,000 units. The long-awaited album Dance with Me was released in October 1993 and remained in the charts all over Europe for quite some time, which was followed by another single, "Take Control", again from his debut album. It earned him yet another Gold award in Germany for sales of over 250,000 units, as the song also entered the Top 20 in numerous countries. While DJ BoBo appeared to have already separated himself from one-hit wonders, he released his next single, "Everybody", in the summer of 1994, which climbed as high as No. 2 in Germany and was certified Platinum for selling 500,000 units there. "Everybody" differed from the previously released singles in terms of its structure; it diverged from house, leaning towards a mixture of house and hip hop ("hip house"), with female vocalists performing the chorus and rap verses performed by BoBo.

In the fall of 1994, his second studio album There Is a Party was released. While the album peaked at No. 4 in Switzerland where it was certified Platinum for selling over 50,000 units, it entered the Top 10 in Germany, where it spent total of 26 weeks on the chart, eventually reaching Gold status for selling over 250,000 units. The single "Let the Dream Come True" from the album topped the charts in Switzerland and entered the Top 5 in Germany, where it was certified Gold for sales over 250,000 units. While the follow-up second single, "Love Is All Around", entered the Top 20 in Switzerland, Austria, Belgium, Sweden, and Norway, it was certified Gold in Germany being the sixth golden record in a row. During the course of this ongoing success, in 1995, DJ BoBo represented Switzerland in the World Music Awards in Monaco, being the "World's Best Selling Swiss Artist of the Year".

In the summer of 1995, DJ BoBo went on a tour which took place in most parts of Asia, which was followed by a promotional tour in Australia. Later that year, DJ BoBo travelled all over Europe performing in front of as many as 400,000 spectators.

BoBo released his first ballad, "Love Is the Price", in January 1996, which was introduced in Thomas Gottschalk's TV show Wetten, dass..?. Later that year, DJ BoBo again ended up at the World Music Awards in Monaco for being the "World's Best Selling Swiss Artist of the Year", performing two songs back to back; "Freedom" (which was his eighth Gold record in a row in Germany) as well as his newly released ballad "Love Is the Price".

=== 1996–1999: Established popularity ===
The release of the album World in Motion in September 1996 proved not only DJ BoBo's consistent presence in the charts, but with this album, he managed to break all his previous records. It took only a few weeks for the album to reach the No. 3 position in Germany and be awarded Platinum for selling 500,000 units. In Switzerland, the album jumped from 0 to No. 1 and was awarded Double-Platinum for selling 100,000 units. It was ranked in the Top 40 albums of all-time, after remaining on the Swiss album chart for a staggering 67 weeks. Shortly after the release of World in Motion, DJ BoBo went on a promotional tour in Asia for 20 days, which was followed up by a one month-tour in Brazil, Chile, and Colombia.

In April 1997, DJ BoBo received his third World Music Award in Monaco for being the "World's Best Selling Swiss Artist of the Year" where he performed his single "Respect Yourself".

DJ BoBo maintained his original sound and experimented with new sounds and vocal arrangements when he introduced his singing skills first on his single "Where Is Your Love", which was released in March 1998. A month later, in April 1998, his album Magic was released which managed to stay in the No. 1 position for four consecutive weeks in his native country and earned him a Platinum award for sales of over 50,000 units. In Germany, the album peaked at No. 5 and spent total of 21 weeks on the chart, eventually earning the Swiss artist another Gold award for sales of over 250,000 units.

In May of that the same year, BoBo received the World Music Award for being the "World's Best Selling Swiss Artist of the Year" for the fourth time. Soon after, his single "Celebrate" was released introducing his The Ultimate Megamix '99. During this time DJ BoBo and his crew were busy preparing for his "Life on Tour" concert as well as the shows of the Magic, which were watched by 250,000 people in 35 concert arenas in Europe. Shortly thereafter, DJ BoBo was rewarded with yet another World Music Award for being the "World's Best Selling Swiss Artist of the Year" for the fifth time in a row.

=== 1999–2001 ===
DJ BoBo's sixth album, Level 6, was released in October 1999 and immediately hit the No. 1 position in the Swiss album charts. It eventually went Platinum at his home as well as Gold in Germany for sales of over 150,000 units. Two singles were released off this album, "Together" and "Lies". DJ BoBo's success continued, as once again in the spring of 2000, he received yet another trophy at the World Music Award for the sixth time in a row for being Switzerland's "Best Selling Artist of the Year".

With the help of his co-producer Axel Breitung, BoBo managed to complete his next album, Planet Colors, released on 5 February 2001. The first single, "What a Feeling", features American singer Irene Cara and is a cover version of Cara's original hit Flashdance... What a Feeling. It peaked at No. 2 in Switzerland, No. 11 in Austria, and No. 3 in Germany. Two other singles were followed: "Hard to Say I'm Sorry" and "Colors of Life". BoBo's tour "Planet Colors – The Show" was a big hit and was followed by more than one million spectators within Europe.

=== 2001–2005: 10-year anniversary ===
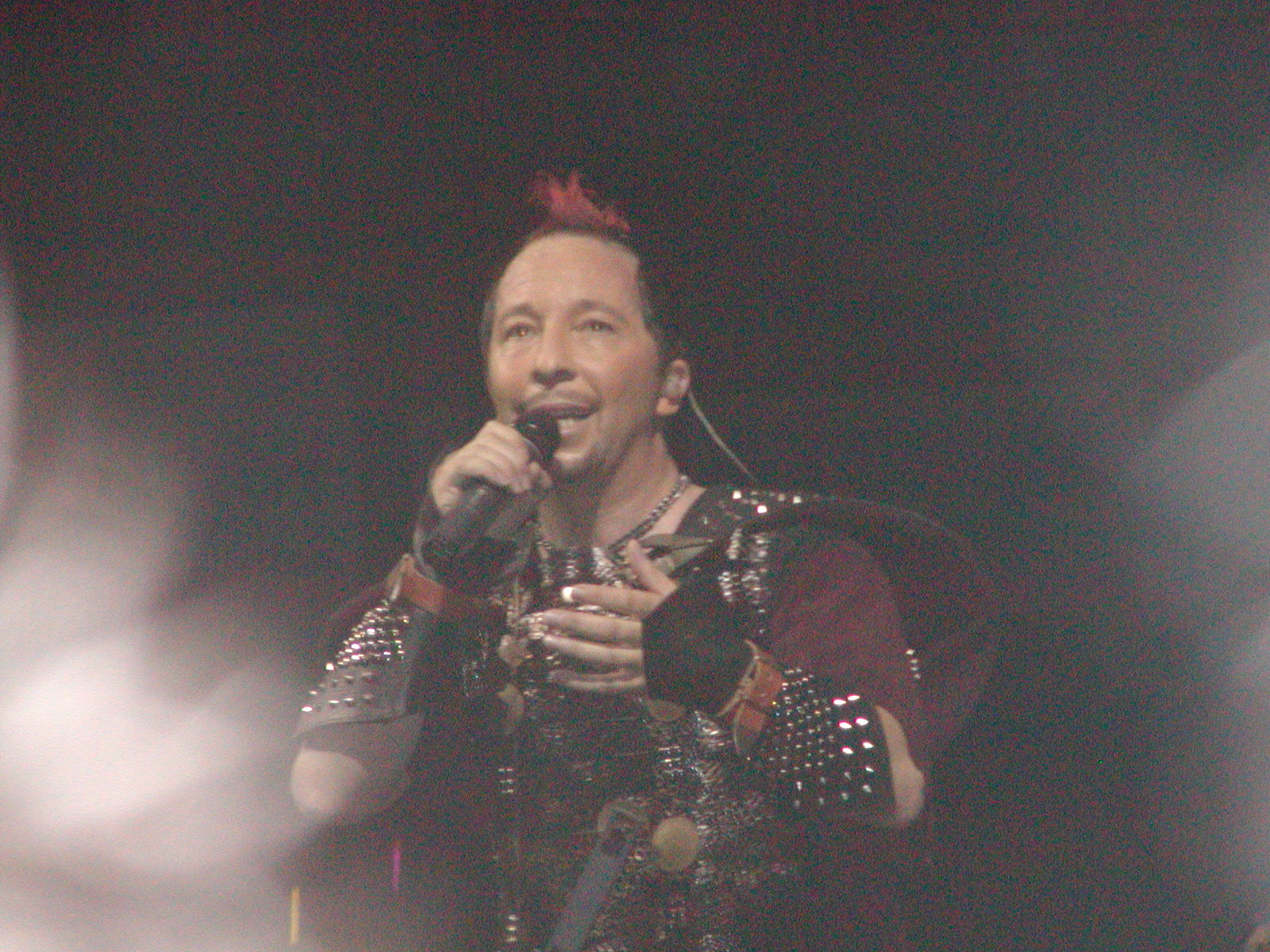
DJ BoBo in 2005

As a way of celebrating his 10-year anniversary in the music business, DJ BoBo made the cover version of Kool and the Gang's "Celebration", reviving it with modern instrumentation. The single was to represent his collection album consisting of previous hits, which he also entitled Celebration. The album Celebration, released in April 2002, comprised the previous hits all of which were re-recorded featuring mostly German renowned artists such as No Angels on "Where is Your Love", Melanie Thornton on "Love of My Life", Emilia on "Everybody", and A Touch of Class on "Together". Besides DJ BoBo being Switzerland's Best Selling Recording Artist at the World Music Awards in 2002 for the seventh time, in 2002, BoBo and co-producer Axel Breitung were recognised as the "Best Producers of 2001"during the Echo awards for being the most-talented musical team.

DJ BoBo's next studio album called Visions, released in February 2003, brought a new side to his music, which aside from the usual dance-sounds, portrayed him with more acoustic elements. Examples of this are the songs "Angel" and "Do You Remember", wherein guitars replaced the usual synthesizers. The Album Visions peaked at No. 3 in Switzerland and eventually became a Platinum record in the country. In 2003, BoBo received yet another World Music Award for being Switzerland's Best Selling Artist of the year.

One of BoBo's most successful singles turned out to be "Chihuahua", which was initially released in 2002 and later re-released Europe-wide. The track was produced upon the request of Coca-Cola in Spain, as they were in search of an artist who could produce an attention-drawing song for their new campaign. The track was completed within a period of ten days. It took only a couple of weeks for "Chihuahua" to reach No. 1 on the Spanish single chart. The song eventually reached No. 1 in both Switzerland and France. It was certified Platinum in Switzerland for sales of over 40,000 units, and in France reached a Diamond status for sales of over one million units.

=== 2005–2008: Eurovision Song Contest and 10th World Music Award ===
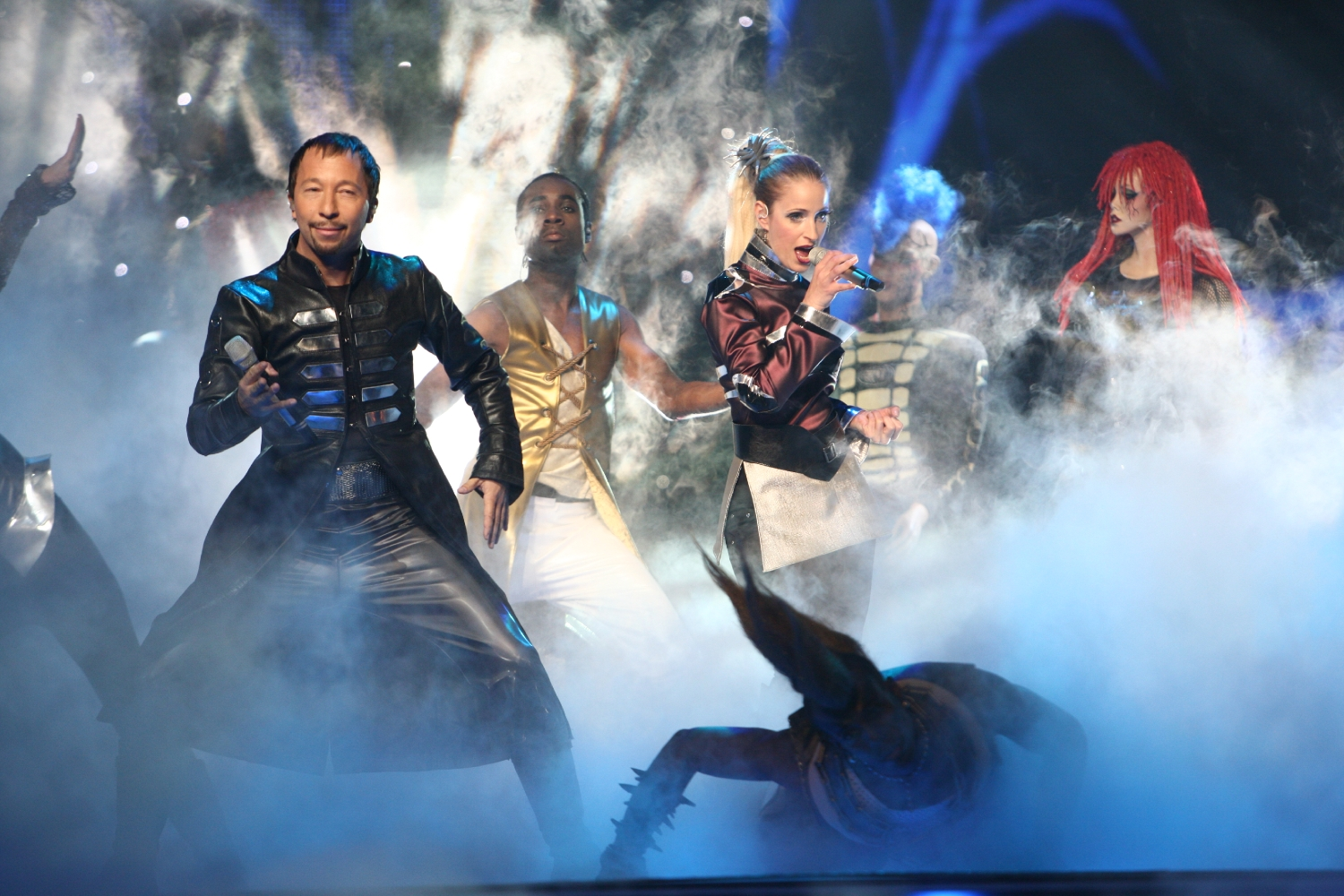
DJ BoBo (left) performing "Vampires Are Alive" in the Eurovision Song Contest 2007 semi-final

BoBo's next studio album, Pirates of Dance, was released in February 2005, and included two singles called "Pirates of Dance" and "Amazing Life". The album shot straight to No. 1 in Switzerland. BoBo and his crew began the Pirates of Dance Tour in April 2005. They took off in Switzerland, followed by Germany and Poland, which concluded with two concerts in Disneyland and Paris. 2005 was the year that made DJ BoBo Switzerland's Best Selling Recording Artist of the Year for the 10th time.

BoBo released his greatest hits album in 2006, which contained reworked versions of some of his previous songs, and some remaining in their original package. The single "Secrets of Love", which was released before the album, was a pop-dance duet with 1980s star Sandra. The song's music video was filmed at Disney Resort Paris. His greatest hits compilation eventually earned BoBo a Gold certification in Switzerland.

On 11 October 2006, DJ BoBo announced in a press conference that he had applied to represent Switzerland at the Eurovision Song Contest 2007.

In past years, Switzerland's entry had not always been a Swiss national. Most notably, Canadian Celine Dion won the Eurovision Song Contest 1988 representing Switzerland. In DJ BoBo's press conference, he told reporters that "It's a shame for Swiss tax payer money from the TV licence fees go to fund a foreign act, and the people should resist that."

In December 2006, the Swiss TV council announced that they had chosen BoBo out of over 200 applicants to represent Switzerland in Helsinki, Finland. Following the selection, the council was criticised for not being fair towards lesser known Swiss artists. On 21 February 2007, DJ BoBo revealed both the song and the video for the contest: "Vampires Are Alive". Despite being one of the favorites to win the contest according to bookmakers, the song failed to get past the semi-final stage on 12 May. It finished twentieth out of 28 semi-finalists.

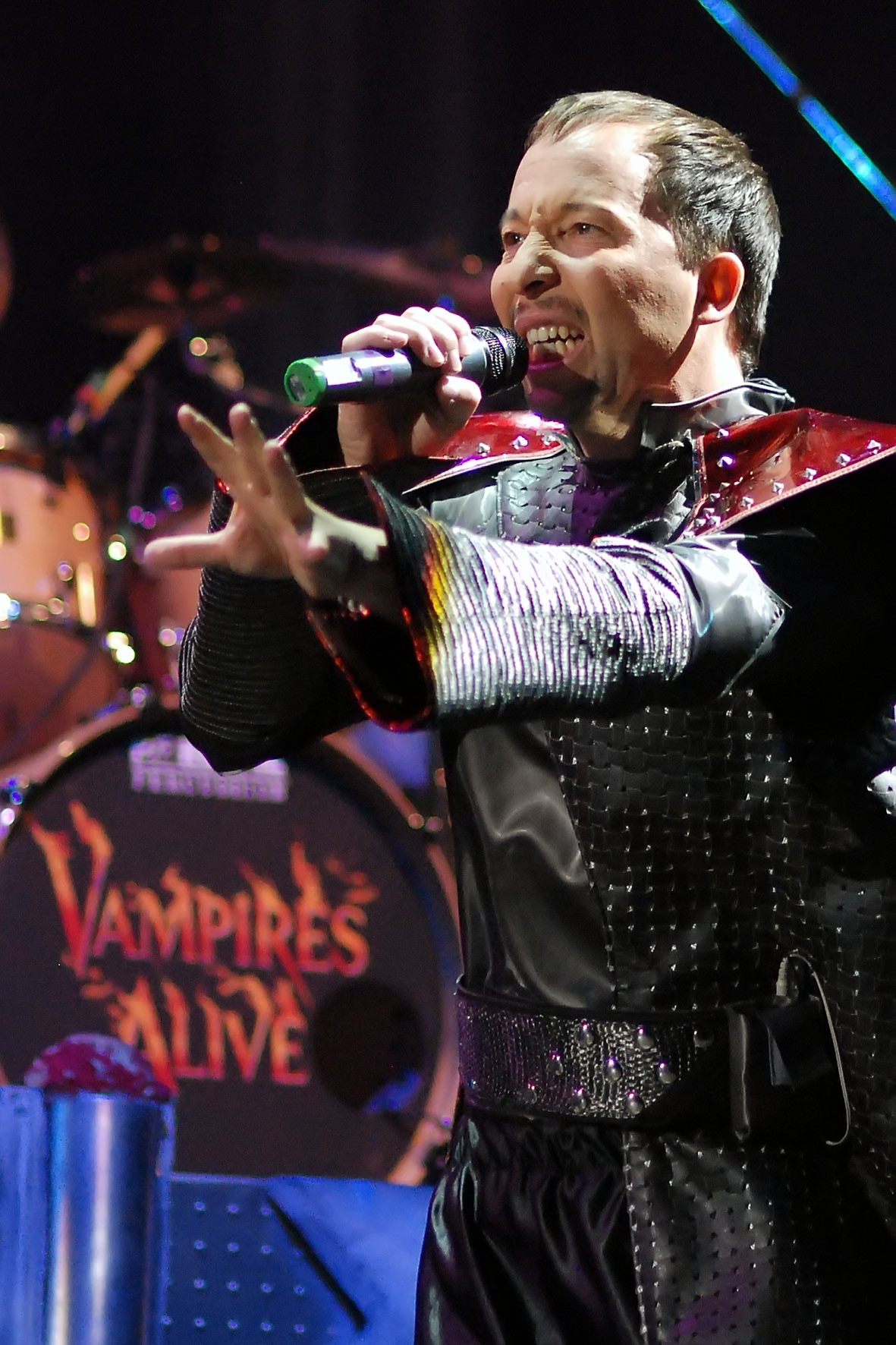
DJ BoBo performing in 2008

DJ BoBo released his next album, Vampires, on 11 May 2007, which climbed as high as No. 2 on the Swiss album chart. The first single, "Vampires Are Alive", reached No. 3 in Switzerland and charted moderately in the rest of the German-speaking countries, but gained success in Finland, where it reached No. 7. Two other singles were released, "We Gotta Hold On" and "Because of You" off the album Vampires.

In 2007, BoBo was chosen to sing the official 2008 UEFA European Football Championship song. On his website, BoBo presented a poll to choose which song out of two would be the official song. Eventually, "Olé Olé" was chosen over "Let the Games Begin". On 11 April 2008, "Olé Olé" was released as a single, being accompanied by an album called Olé Olé – Party. The album included five new songs, nine party hits, a medley, a newly remixed version of BoBo's hit "Everybody", and a new version of "Vampires Are Alive" titled "EAPM Remix".

=== 2008–present ===
DJ BoBo's album Fantasy was released on 26 February 2010. It peaked at No. 2 in Switzerland and was certified Gold for selling over 15,000 units. The two singles released off the album were "Superstar" and "This Is My Time".

A new release from BoBo, entitled Dancing Las Vegas, was released on 25 November 2011. The album contains 13 tracks and comes with a DVD which is composed of six parts, including the video clip of the previously released single "Everybody's Gonna Dance".

BoBo released another studio album called Circus on 10 January 2014, followed by Mystorial in 2016 and KaleidoLuna in 2018. As with BoBo's previous studio albums, Circus and Mystorial charted in the Top 5 in Switzerland, while KaleidoLuna charted at No. 9.

== Charitable work ==
DJ BoBo became a United Nations World Food Programme National Ambassador Against Hunger in October 2006, becoming the first Swiss celebrity to take up the role. He was also a participant in the 2006 Geneva Walk the World event.

== Discography ==
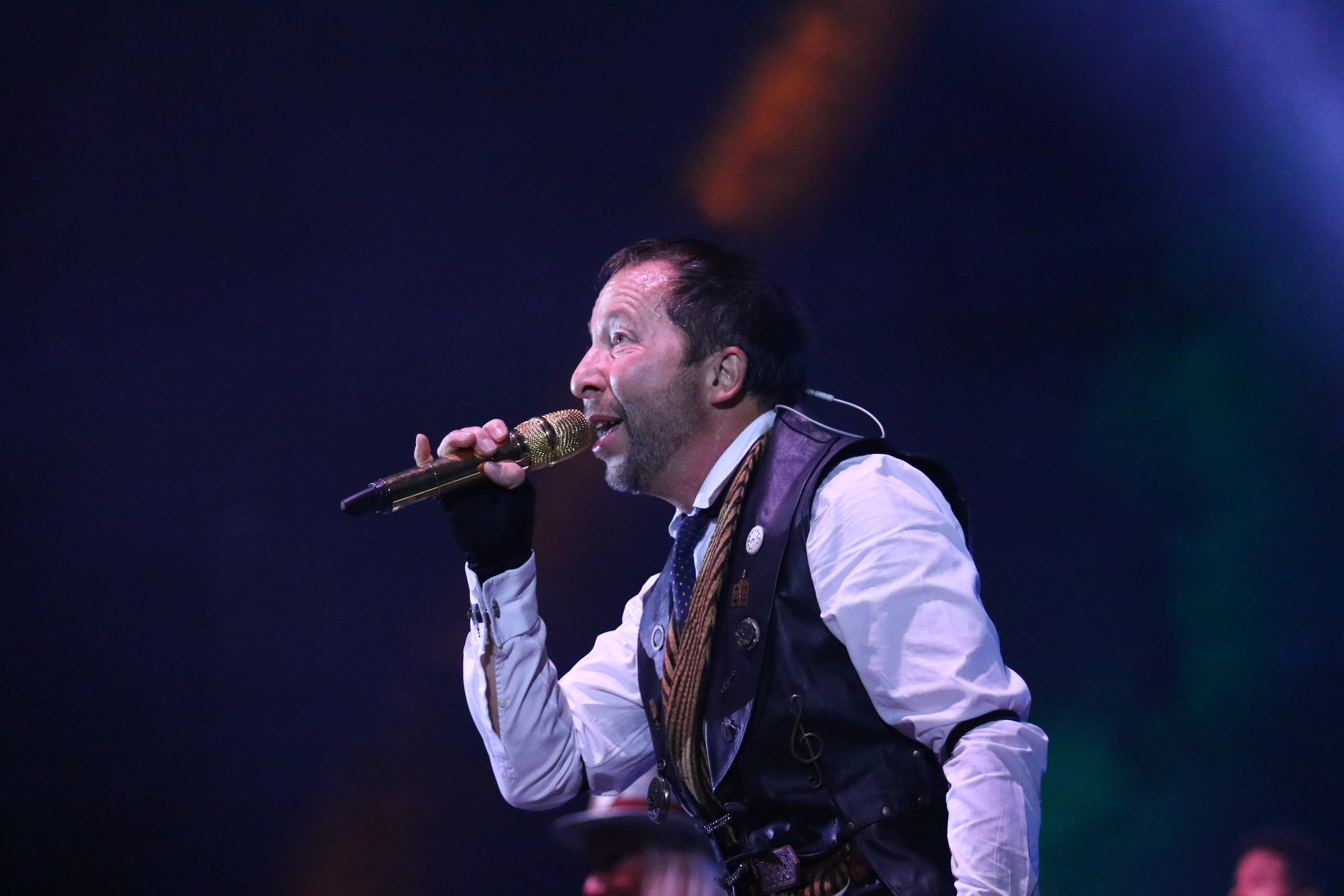
DJ BoBo in 2018

Studio albums

- Dance with Me (1993)
- There Is a Party (1994)
- Just for You (1995)
- World in Motion (1996)
- Magic (1998)
- Level 6 (1999)
- The Ultimate Megamix '99 (1999)
- Planet Colors (2001)
- Celebration (2002)
- Visions (2003)
- Live in Concert (2003)
- Pirates of Dance (2005)
- Greatest Hits (2006)
- Sweet Christmas (2006)
- Vampires (2007)
- Olé Olé – The Party (2008)
- Fantasy (2010)
- Dancing Las Vegas (2011)
- Reloaded (2013)
- Circus (2014)
- Mystorial (2016)
- KaleidoLuna (2018)
- Remixes & Unreleased Tracks (2020)
- Evolut30n (2022)
- The Great Adventure (16.01.2026)
- Best of (01.05.2026)

== Filmography ==
=== Film ===
Year	Title	Role	Notes
2011	Das Geheimnis von Schloss Balthasar	Böckli	Short film; lead role
2015	The Time Carousel	Böckli	Short film; supporting role
2025	Grand Prix of Europe	Böckli	Supporting role

Key
†	Denotes films that have not yet been released

Preceded by six4one with "If We All Give a Little"	Switzerland in the Eurovision Song Contest; 2007	Succeeded by Paolo Meneguzzi with "Era stupendo"
