= Nanne Grönvall discography =

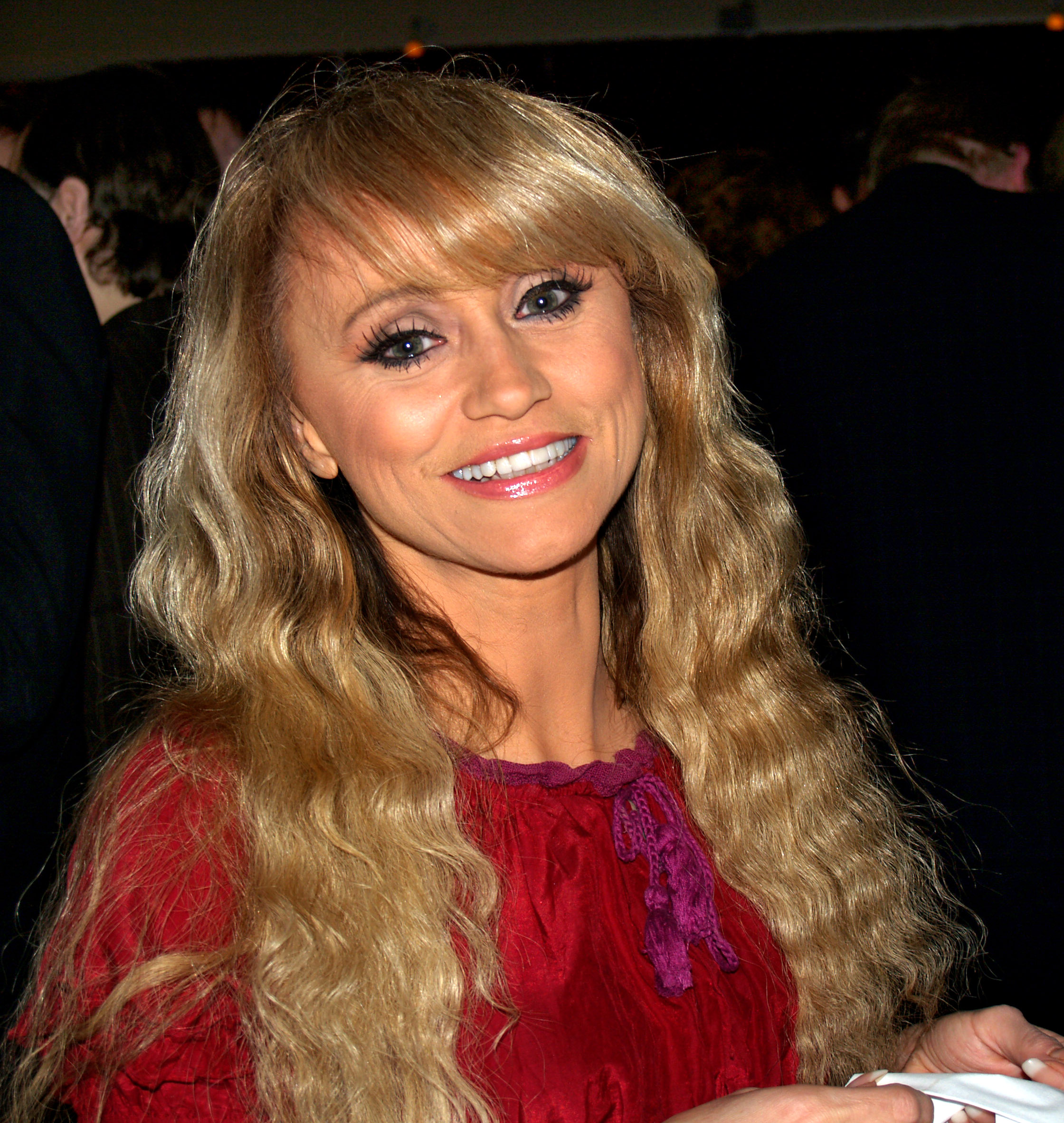
- Grönvall in Gothenburg at Melodifestivalen 2010 on February 21st, 2010.
- Studio albums: 11
- Compilation albums: 2
- Singles: 43

The discography of Swedish singer Nanne Grönvall consists of 11 albums. Grönvall is a former member of Sound of Music and Peter's Pop Squad and a current member of One More Time.

== Studio albums ==
=== Sound of Music ===
List of albums, with Swedish chart positions
Title	Album details	SWE Chart	
Title	Album details	Peak position	Time in (weeks)
Sound Of Music	Released: 1986; Label: Alpha Records (ONECD 004)	20	4w
Sound Of Music II	Released: 1987; Label: Alpha Records (ONECD 019)	50	1w
"—" denotes releases that did not chart.

=== One More Time ===
List of albums, with Swedish chart positions
Title	Album details	SWE Chart	
Title	Album details	Peak position	Time in (weeks)
Highland	Released: October 1992; Label: CNR Records (955.009-2)	19	12w
One More Time	Released: 1994; Label: CNR Records (955.017-2)	—	—
Den vilda	Released: June 1996; Label: Columbia Records (COL 484286 2)	29	7w
Living In A Dream	Released: 1997; Label: Columbia Records (COL 484310 2); English version of Den vilda	—	—
"—" denotes releases that did not chart.

=== Solo albums ===
List of albums, with Swedish chart positions
Title	Album details	SWE Chart		Certifications
Title	Album details	Peak position	Time in (weeks)	Certifications
Cirkus homo sapiens	Released: April 1998; Re-Released: 1999; Label: Somco Records (SOMCOCD 001)	38	4w	—
Alla mina ansikten	Released: 2001; Re-Released: 2002; Label: Somco Records (SOMCOCD 002)	—	—	—
20 år med Nanne	Released: April 13, 2005; Label: Lionheart (LHICD0022); Compilation album	2	20w	Gold (May 10, 2005); Platinum (March 31, 2006)
Alltid på väg	Released: October 19, 2005; Label: Lionheart (LHICD0028)	7	13w	Gold (November 21, 2005)
Jag måste kyssa dig	Released: March 21, 2007; Label: Lionheart (LHICD0044)	4	21w	Gold (May 22, 2007)
En rastlös själ	Released: October 6, 2010; Label: Lionheart (LHICD0117)	4	10w	—
My Rock Favourites	Released: November 23, 2011; Label: Lionheart (LHICD0137)	4	10w	—
Drama Queen	Released: January 29, 2014; Label: Somco Records / Playground PGM	4		—
"—" denotes releases that did not chart.

== Singles ==
=== Sound of Music ===
List of singles & songs, with Swedish chart positions
Title	Year	Singles Chart	Svensktoppen	Trackslistan	Album
Title	Year	HP	HP	HP	Album
"One More Lonely Night"	1985	—	—	10	Sound Of Music
"Eldorado"	1986	6	4	3	Sound Of Music
"Blue Magic Woman"	1986	—	—	11	Sound Of Music
"Self Erection"	1986	—	—	20	Sound Of Music
"Love Me Or Leave Me"	1986	—	—	6	Sound Of Music II
"Alexandra"	1987	15	3	4	Sound Of Music II
"Once Again"	1987	—	—	15	Sound Of Music II
"Summer Sensation"	1987	—	—	22 *	Sound Of Music II
"Magic Night"	1988	—	—	21 *	Sound Of Music II
"—" denotes releases that did not chart
" * " denotes "bubbling under" songs, which were tested for but did not enter the Tracklistan top20

=== Peter's Pop Squad ===
List of singles & songs, with Swedish chart positions
Title	Year	Singles Chart	Svensktoppen	Trackslistan	Album
Title	Year	HP	HP	HP	Album
"Have You Heard"	1990	—	—	—	single only
"Strangers in the night (Tonight)"	1990	—	—	—	single only
"—" denotes releases that did not chart

=== One More Time ===
List of singles & songs, with Swedish chart positions
Title	Year	Singles Chart	Svensktoppen	Trackslistan	Album
Title	Year	HP	HP	HP	Album
"Highland"	1992	2	—	3	Highland
"Calming Rain"	1993	—	—	21 *	Highland
"Turn Out The Light"	1993	—	—	—	Highland
"No One Else Like You"	1993	—	—	22 *	Highland
"Song Of Fête"	1994	36	—	18	One More Time
"Get Out"	1994	—	—	—	One More Time
"The Dolphin"	1994	—	—	—	One More Time
"Den vilda"	1996	7	5	5	Den vilda
"Kvarnen"	1996	—	—	—	Den vilda
"The Wilderness Mistress"	1996	—	—	—	Living In A Dream
"Vägskälet"^{[A]}	1997	—	13 *	—	Den vilda
"Living In A Dream"	1997	—	—	—	Living In A Dream
"—" denotes releases that did not chart
" * " denotes "bubbling under" songs, which were tested for but did not enter the Svensktoppen top10 or Trackslistan top20

^{A} Radio/promo only

=== Solo singles ===
List of singles & songs, with Swedish chart positions
Title	Year	Singles Chart	Svensktoppen	Trackslistan	Album
Title	Year	HP	HP	HP	Album
"Kul i jul"	1997	—	—	—	Cirkus homo sapiens
"Avundsjuk"	1998	6	2	4	Cirkus homo sapiens
"Nannes sommarvisa"	1998	—	14*	—	Cirkus homo sapiens
"Vem som helst"	1998	—	5	—	Cirkus homo sapiens
"Vem som helst" (re-release)	1999	—	—	—	Cirkus homo sapiens
"Svarta änkan"	2000	—	8	—	Alla mina ansikten
"Jag har inte tid"	2000	—	6	—	Alla mina ansikten
"Men"	2001	54	—	—	Alla mina ansikten
"Ekan"^{[A]}	2001	—	14*	—	Alla mina ansikten
"Fördomar"	2001	—	6	—	Alla mina ansikten
"Ett vackert par" (with Nick Borgen)^{[A]}	2002	—	13*	—	Alla mina ansikten
"Vi Är Dom Tuffaste, Dom Starkaste, Dom Grymmaste, Dom Vackraste" (with Hockeykören)	2002	—	—	—	single only
"Evig kärlek"	2003	57	—	—	single only
"Håll om mig"	2005	1	1	2	20 år med Nanne
"Om du var min / Jag sträcker mig mot himlen"	2005	3	9	—	20 år med Nanne
"Lyckos dig"	2005	5	4	—	Alltid på väg
"Många karlar lite tid"	2006	11	8	—	Alltid på väg
"Jag måste kyssa dig"	2007	14	11*	—	Jag måste kyssa dig
"Ännu en dag"	2007	16	6	—	Jag måste kyssa dig
"Pissenisse"	2007	4	6	—	Jag måste kyssa dig
"Otacksamhet"	2009	2	11*	—	En rastlös själ
"I natt är jag din"	2010	4	—	—	En rastlös själ
"En rastlös själ"	2010	41	5	—	En rastlös själ
"Explosivt"^{[B]}	2010	—	—	—	En rastlös själ
"Kom igen"^{[A]}	2011	—	7	—	En rastlös själ
"Nag"^{[B]}	2011	—	—	—	My Rock Favourites
"Ingen dansar dåligt (lika bra som jag)"^{[B]}	2013	—	—	—	TBA
"—" denotes releases that did not chart
" * " denotes "bubbling under" songs, which were tested for but did not enter the Svensktoppen top10

^{A} Radio/promo only
^{B} Digital release only

== Other songs ==
- Stilla natt on the En nygammal jul Christmas album (2002)
