= Living in a Dream =

Living in a Dream may refer to:

- "Living in a Dream" (Finger Eleven song), 2010
- "Living in a Dream" (Pseudo Echo song), 1986
- "Det vackraste", a 1995 Swedish song, released with the English title "Living in a Dream"
- "Den vilda (album)", 1996 album by Swedish band One More Time, translated as "Living in a Dream" in English, including "Det vackraste"
- Living in a Dream (album), a 2005 live album by Arc Angels

== See also ==
- Living a Dream, a 2005 album by Katherine Jenkins
- Livin' on a Dream, a 2007 album by Robin Beck
- "Living in a Child's Dream" a 1967 single by the Masters Apprentices
- Living the Dream (disambiguation)
