= Alltid på väg =

Studio album by Nanne
- Released: October 19, 2005
- Recorded: 2005
- Genre: Pop, Rock
- Length: 52:17
- Label: Lionheart, (LHICD0028)
- Producer: Nanne Grönvall, Peter Grönvall, Amir Aly, Paul Rein, Torbjörn Stener, Henrik Wikström

Nanne chronology
20 år med Nanne (2005)	Alltid på väg (2005)	Jag måste kyssa dig (2007)

Singles from Alltid på väg
- 1. "Håll om mig" Released: March 2005; 2. "Om du var min / Jag sträcker mig mot himlen" Released: June 2005; 3. "Lyckos dig" Released: October 2005; 4. "Många karlar, lite tid" Released: February 2006

Alltid på väg (Always on the road) is the third studio album by Swedish singer/songwriter Nanne Grönvall, released in October 2005.

== Track listing ==
Alltid på väg
No.	Title	Writer(s)	Title (English translation)	Length
1.	"Lyckos dig"	Nanne Grönvall, Peter Grönvall	Lucky you	3:23
2.	"Det fanns en tid"	N. Edberger, J. Fransson, T. Larsson, T. Lundgren	There was a time	3:42
3.	"Om du var min"	N. Edberger, J. Fransson, T. Larsson, T. Lundgren	If you were mine	3:03
4.	"Ensamhet"	N. Edberger, J. Fransson, T. Larsson, T. Lundgren	Loneliness	3:36
5.	"Shubidu-dum-dum"	Nanne Grönvall	Shubidu-dum-dum	3:03
6.	"Om du var hos mig"	Nanne Grönvall	If you were with me	3:09
7.	"Ta det man vill ha"	Ingela Forsman	Take what you want	3:16
8.	"Att lära änglar sägla"	Nanne Grönvall, Nance Järnberg Führ	Teach the angels to fly	3:00
9.	"Håll om mig"	Nanne Grönvall, Ingela Forsman	Hold me	3:02
10.	"Jag vill få dig tillbaks"	Nanne Grönvall	I want you back	4:06
11.	"Änglavakt"	Fredrik Kempe, Anders Henjer	Guardian angel	3:19
12.	"Unik"	Nanne Grönvall	Unique	0:36
13.	"Många karlar, lite tid"	Bobby Ljunggren, Nanne Grönvall, Henrik Wikström	Many men, little time	2:59
14.	"Jag sträcker mig mot himlen"	Nanne Grönvall	I reach to the sky	3:00
15.	"Vem är perfekt?"	Nanne Grönvall	Who is perfect?	0:46
16.	"Jag orkar inte älska dig längre"	Nanne Grönvall	I cannot love you any longer	4:30
17.	"Sitter här och älskar dig"	Wille Crafoord	Sitting here and loving you	3:36
Total length:				52:17
