= Jag måste kyssa dig =

Studio album by Nanne
- Released: 21 March 2007
- Recorded: 2006, 2007
- Genres: Pop, Rock
- Length: 40:46
- Labels: Lionheart, (LHICD0044)
- Producers: Peter Grönvall, Mårten Eriksson, Karl-Johan Ankarblom, Dan Sundquist, Henrik Wikström

Nanne chronology
Alltid på väg (2005)	Jag måste kyssa dig (2007)	En rastlös själ (2010)

Singles from Jag måste kyssa dig
- 1. "Jag måste kyssa dig" Released: March 2007; 2. "Ännu en dag" Released: July 2007; 3. "Pissenisse" Released: September 2007

Jag måste kyssa dig (I must kiss you) is the fourth studio album by Swedish singer/songwriter Nanne Grönvall, released in March 2007.

== Track listing ==
Jag måste kyssa dig
No.	Title	Lyrics	Music	Title (English translation)	Length
1.	"Jag måste kyssa dig"	Ingela Forsman	Nanne Grönvall, Peter Grönvall	I must kiss you	3:03
2.	"Pissenisse"	Nanne Grönvall	Nanne Grönvall		3:19
3.	"Som en bro över mörka vatten"	Åke Arenhill	Paul Simon	Like a bridge over dark (troubled) water	3:52
4.	"Desperat"	Nanne Grönvall	Nanne Grönvall, Peter Grönvall	Desperate	3:23
5.	"Kom hit" (with Paul Rein)	J. Becker, F. Thomander, A. Wikström	J. Becker, F. Thomander, A. Wikström	Come here	3:12
6.	"Hur kan jag va så dum"	Wille Crafoord	Nanne Grönvall, Peter Grönvall	How could I be so stupid	3:28
7.	"Ännu en dag"	Nanne Grönvall	Bobby Ljunggren, Henrik Wikström	Another day	3:02
8.	"Se men inte röra"	Nanne Grönvall	Nanne Grönvall	Look but not touch	3:37
9.	"Viskaren"	Nanne Grönvall	Nanne Grönvall, Peter Grönvall	The whisperer	3:37
10.	"Skor"	Marie Rein	Paul Rein	Shoes	3:21
11.	"Hornen i pannan"	Nanne Grönvall	Nanne Grönvall	Horns on the forehead	3:58
12.	"Livet de måste levas live"	Wille Crafoord	Nanne Grönvall	Life must be lived live	2:46
Total length:					40:46

== Charts ==
=== Weekly charts ===
Chart (2007)	Peak position
Swedish Albums (Sverigetopplistan)	4

=== Year-end charts ===
Chart (2007)	Position
Swedish Albums (Sverigetopplistan)	52
