= Josefin Crafoord =

Swedish television and radio host

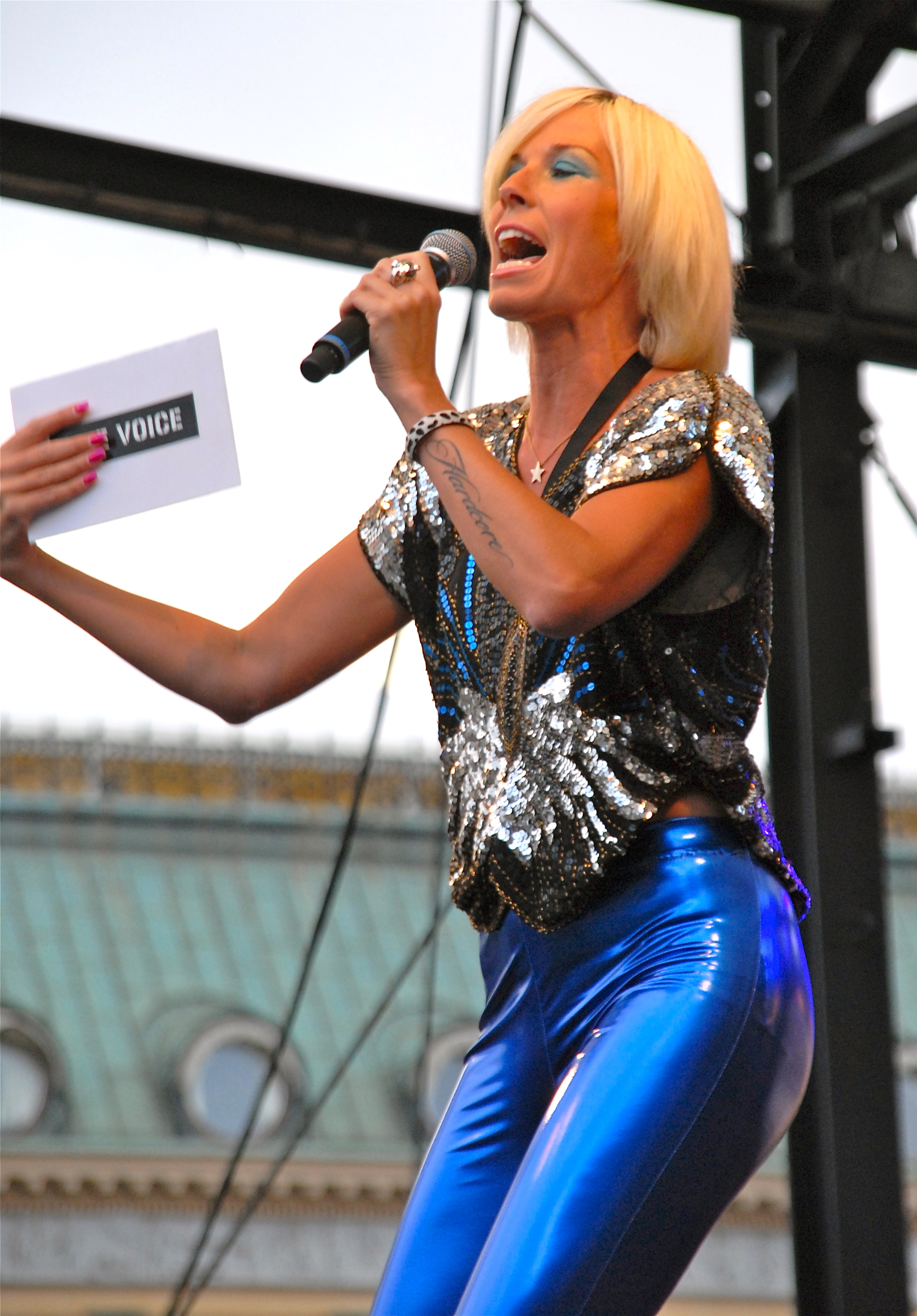
- Born: Josefin Leffler; 5 April 1973 (age 52); Gothenburg, Sweden
- Occupations: Television host, radio host
- Spouse: Martin Aliaga
- Children: 2

Josefin Crafoord (born 5 April 1973) is a Swedish television and radio host. She has hosted the radio show VAKNA! med The Voice on The Voice Hiphop & RnB Sweden since 2007 with co-hosts Jakob Öqvist och Paul Haukka. The show is also televised on Kanal 5 every morning. With Kjell Eriksson as comic relief as well. Before hosting VAKNA! med The Voice, Crafoord had done radio work on Sveriges Radio P3.

Crafoord's television career began in the 1990s at the Swedish music channel ZTV where she presented music videos. In 1998, she turned to TV3 to host the television show Silikon with Gry Forssell. Crafoord then became a continuity announcer at TV4 and the host of the Swedish version of Paradise Hotel in 2005. Crafoord returned to TV3 in 2006 as the host of the dating-show Fling. Fling turned out to be a ratings-flop and Crafoord moved to TV400 in 2007 to host Snyggast i klassen with Erik Ekstrand.

Crafoord was one of the contestants in the Swedish version of Dancing on Ice that aired on TV4 in Autumn 2008. She had never ice-skated before agreeing to appear on the show and originally declined the offer because of this. In her spare time, Crafoord is a member of the Eurodance group Domenicer that she started in 1999 with Wai Chan and Martin Blix. Their first single, "Disco Dance", was released on 14 June 1999. Crafoord is also a blogger.

Crafoord was previously married with musician Wille Crafoord, whom she had one son with, Roderick. She had her second child, Charlie, a few years later with her new partner Martin Aliaga. Crafoord lives in Södermalm, Stockholm with Aliaga, her two children, and her pet chihuahua.
