= Cecilia Vennersten (album) =

Studio album by Cecilia Vennersten
- Released: (Sweden) 1995
- Genre: Pop
- Producer: One More Time, Ulf Söderberg

Cecilia Vennersten chronology
Cecilia Vennersten (1995)	Till varje leende, en tår (1997)

Cecilia Vennersten is the debut studio album by Swedish pop singer Cecilia Vennersten. It was released in 1995. At the album charts, it peaked number 9 in Sweden and number two in Norway, selling platinum in both countries. The album contains songs such as the Melodifestivalen 1995 hit "Det vackraste" and "Sjunde himlen finns", a Swedish language version of "Show Me Heaven" by Maria McKee. It also contains "Lämnad i mörkret", a Swedish language version of "Left in the Dark" written by Jim Steinman.

== Track listing ==
1. "Det vackraste" (Maria Rådsten, Nanne Grönvall, Peter Grönvall) 3:20
2. "Innerst i själen" (Lars Børke, Ole Paus, Örjan Englund) 4:35
3. "Hornen i pannan" (Nanne Grönvall) 3:24
4. "Kapten Nemo" (Erik Holmberg, Krister Linder) 5:10
5. "Skogens Rå" (Maria Rådsten, Nanne Grönvall, Peter Grönvall) 5:00
6. "Sjunde himlen finns" (Eric Rackin, Jay Rifkin, Maria McKee; Swedish lyrics by Nanne Grönvall) 3:56
7. "Mitt andra jag" (Andrea Weiss-Siguera, Frank Peterson, Matthias Meissner, Thomas Schwartz) 4:11
8. "Du är min religion" (Jane Child; Swedish lyrics by Nanne Grönvall) 5:19
9. "Tiden" - (Don Black, Simon Climie; Swedish lyrics by Nanne Grönvall) 4:17
10. "Lämnad i mörkret" - (Jim Steinman; Swedish lyrics by Nanne Grönvall) 6:46

== Charts ==
Chart (1995–1996)	Peak position
Norway	2
Sweden	9
