= Om du tror att jag saknar dig =

2020 single by Jakob Karlberg

Single by Jakob Karlberg
- Released: 22 February 2020
- Length: 3:00
- Label: Sony Music
- Songwriter(s): Nanne Grönvall, Isak Hallén, Henrik Moreborg, Jakob Karlberg
- Producer(s): Mattias Andréasson

"Om du tror att jag saknar dig" is a Swedish language song by singer Jakob Karlberg. The song was performed for the first time in Melodifestivalen 2020, subsequently being released as a single on 22 February 2020. It was written by Henrik Moreberg, Isak Hallén, Karlberg and Nanne Grönvall. The song was produced by Mattias Andréasson. It peaked at number 70 on the Swedish Singles Chart.

== Charts ==
Chart (2020)	Peak position
Sweden (Sverigetopplistan)	70
