= En rastlös själ =

Studio album by Nanne
- Released: October 6, 2010
- Recorded: 2009, 2010
- Genre: Pop
- Length: 43:36
- Label: Lionheart, (LHICD0117)
- Producer: Nanne Grönvall

Nanne chronology
Jag måste kyssa dig (2007)	En rastlös själ (2010)

Singles from En rastlös själ
- 1. "Otacksamhet" Released: September 2, 2009; 2. "I natt är jag din" Released: February 15, 2010; 3. "En rastlös själ" Released: August 18, 2010

En rastlös själ (A restless soul) is the fifth studio album by Swedish singer/songwriter Nanne Grönvall, released in October 2010.

== Track listing ==
En rastlös själ track listing
No.	Title	Writer(s)	Title (English translation)	Length
1.	"En rastlös själ"	Nanne Grönvall	A restless soul	3:03
2.	"OOPS"	Nanne Grönvall	OOPS	3:13
3.	"Jag ger aldrig upp"	Nanne Grönvall	I never give up	2:46
4.	"Tankar"	Nanne Grönvall	Thoughts	3:11
5.	"Explosivt"	Nanne Grönvall	Explosive	3:23
6.	"Bättre än nånsin"	Nanne Grönvall	Better than ever	3:55
7.	"I natt är jag din"	Tomas Ledin	Tonight I am yours	3:59
8.	"Lätt imponerad"	Nanne Grönvall	Easily impressed	3:13
9.	"Hej snygging"	Nanne Grönvall	Hey hottie	2:58
10.	"Otacksamhet"	Paul Rein, Marie Rein	Ingratitude	3:51
11.	"Himlen är oskyldigt blå"	Ted Gärdestad, Kenneth Gärdestad	The sky is innocently blue	4:08
12.	"Kom igen"	Nanne Grönvall	Come again	3:19
13.	"Lagom"	Nanne Grönvall	Just fine	2:31
Total length:				43:36

All tracks were produced by Nanne herself, except for:

- "I natt är jag din" was produced by Nanne together with her husband Peter Grönvall
- "Otacksamhet" was produced by Paul Rein and Peter Grönvall
- "Himlen är oskyldigt blå" was produced by Tommy Ekman and Kim Wessel
