= Scam (disambiguation) =

A scam is an attempt to defraud a person or group by gaining their confidence.

Scam or Scams may also refer to:

== Arts, entertainment, and media ==
=== Films ===
- Scam (film), a 1993 American TV movie
- The Scam (film), a 2009 South Korean film
- The Scam Artist, a 2004 American film

=== Music ===
- Scam (album), a 2000 album by the Screaming Jets
- "Scam" (song), a 1994 song by Jamiroquai

=== Television ===
- "The Scam", a 1986 episode of the TV sitcom Gimme a Break!
- "The Scam" (The Amazing World of Gumball), a 2016 episode of the animated TV series The Amazing World of Gumball
- "Scam 1992", a 2020 Indian series
- Scams (TV series), a 2019 Japanese series

== Science and technology ==
- SCAM – Parallel SCSI Configured Automatically
- Superconducting camera
- Scientific Certainty Argumentation Method
- S-cam, a mechanism in braking systems

== Other uses ==
- SCAM Spa, an Italian truck manufacturer
- Soluble cell adhesion molecules (sCAM)
- SCAM (zine), a punk rock culture publication
- Internet scam, a common type of scam

== See also ==
- Fraud
- Hoax
- Skam (disambiguation)
