= Skam =

Skam may refer to:

- Skam TV franchise, based on the Norwegian TV show Skam
  - Druck (TV series), 2018-2022 German adaptation
  - Skam (TV series), a Norwegian 2015–2017 TV series
  - SKAM Austin, 2018–2019 American adaptation
  - Skam España, 2018–2020 Spanish adaptation
  - Skam France (aka Skam Belgique, also stylized as SKAM), 2018–2023 French-Walloon adaptation
  - Skam NL, 2018–2019 Dutch adaptation
  - Skam Italia, 2018–2024 Italian adaptation
  - Sram (Croatian TV series), 2024–present Croatian adaptation
  - wtFOCK, 2018–2024 Flemish adaptation
- "Skam" (song), 2001 song by Nanne Grönvall off the album Alla mina ansikten
- Skam Records, an English record label
- Amalfi Airport (Colombia) (ICAO airport code SKAM), Amalfi, Antioquia Department, Colombia

== See also ==
- Scam (disambiguation)
