= Cirkus homo sapiens =

Studio album by Nanne
- Released: April 1998 (June 1999)
- Recorded: 1997, 1998
- Genre: Pop, Rock
- Length: 40:13
- Label: Face Music / Somco Records, (SOMCOCD 001)
- Producer: Nanne Grönvall, Peter Grönvall, Michael B. Tretow

Nanne chronology
Living In A Dream (1997)	Cirkus homo sapiens (1998)	Alla mina ansikten (2001)

Singles from Cirkus homo sapiens
- 1. "Kul i jul" Released: November 1997; 2. "Avundsjuk" Released: March 1998; 3. "Nannes sommarvisa" Released: June 1998; 4. "Vem som helst" Released: September 1998; 5. "Vem som helst (re-release)" Released: April 1999

Alternative cover
- 1999 Reissue

Cirkus homo sapiens is the first studio album by Swedish singer/songwriter Nanne Grönvall, released in April 1998. The album was re-released in June 1999 under Somco Records, Nanne and husband Peter Grönvall's own record label. This re-release had a different cover and included the 1997-recorded "Kul i jul" as bonus track.

== Track listing ==
Cirkus homo sapiens
No.	Title	Writer(s)	Title (English translation)	Length
1.	"Vem som helst"	Nanne Grönvall	Anyone	4:50
2.	"Nannes sommarvisa"	Nanne Grönvall	Nanne's summer-song	3:10
3.	"Avundsjuk"	Nanne Grönvall, Peter Grönvall	Jealous	4:07
4.	"Madonnan"	Nanne Grönvall	Madonna	4:08
5.	"Till dej"	Nanne Grönvall	To you	3:36
6.	"Viskaren"	Nanne Grönvall, Peter Grönvall	The whisperer	3:43
7.	"Cirkus homo sapiens"	Nanne Grönvall, Peter Grönvall	Circus homo sapiens	3:26
8.	"Martyr"	Nanne Grönvall	Martyr	4:32
9.	"Det skulle varit jag"	Norman Whitfield, W. Stevenson	It would have been me	3:13
10.	"Själar av blod"	Nanne Grönvall	Souls of blood	3:47
11.	"Viktiga små ord"	Nanne Grönvall	Important little word	1:38
Total length:				40:13

Cirkus homo sapiens, Version 2 (1999)
No.	Title	Writer(s)	Title (English translation)	Length
1.	"Vem som helst"	Nanne Grönvall	Anyone	4:50
2.	"Nannes sommarvisa"	Nanne Grönvall	Nanne's summer-song	3:10
3.	"Avundsjuk"	Nanne Grönvall, Peter Grönvall	Jealous	4:07
4.	"Madonnan"	Nanne Grönvall	Madonna	4:08
5.	"Till dej"	Nanne Grönvall	To you	3:36
6.	"Viskaren"	Nanne Grönvall, Peter Grönvall	The whisperer	3:43
7.	"Cirkus homo sapiens"	Nanne Grönvall, Peter Grönvall	Circus homo sapiens	3:26
8.	"Martyr"	Nanne Grönvall	Martyr	4:32
9.	"Det skulle varit jag"	Norman Whitfield, W. Stevenson	It would have been me	3:13
10.	"Kul i jul"	Nanne Grönvall	Fun at christmas	3:42
11.	"Själar av blod"	Nanne Grönvall	Souls of blood	3:47
12.	"Viktiga små ord"	Nanne Grönvall	Important little word	1:38
Total length:				43:55
