= Under stjärnornas parasoll =

Studio album by Cecilia Vennersten
- Released: 25 October 2006
- Genre: Pop

Cecilia Vennersten chronology
| Till varje leende, en tår (1997) | Under stjärnornas parasoll (2006) |

Under stjärnornas parasoll is an album from Swedish pop singer Cecilia Vennersten, released on 25 October 2006. She has worked with songwriters as Emma Holland, Johan Sahlén, Simen M. Eriksrud and Stein Austrud to write the songs. "Ett stulet ögonblick" was tested for Svensktoppen.

== Track listing ==
1. Fri
2. Människa
3. Ett stulet ögonblick
4. Nåt så underbart
5. Varje gång jag ser dig
6. Du är så rar
7. Ringar på vatten
8. Du gav dig av
9. Leva
10. Jag är inte hon
11. Min sång
