= Till varje leende, en tår =

Under stjärnornas parasoll

Studio album by Cecilia Vennersten
- Released: 1997
- Genre: Pop

Cecilia Vennersten chronology
Cecilia Vennersten (1995)	Under stjärnornas parasoll (1997)	Under stjärnornas parasoll (2006)

Till varje leende, en tår is an album from Swedish pop singer Cecilia Vennersten, released in 1997. Many songs on the album are in the singer/songwriter genre, compared to her first album; Vennersten wrote much of the music herself.

== Track listing ==
1. Om du ändå förstod
2. Vänd dig aldrig om
3. Hur har vi hamnat här
4. Allt som jag vill ha
5. Lever för dig
6. Minnena består
7. Stanna här hos mig
8. Saker som man gör
9. Någonting hände
10. Längtar hem
