= Den vilda (album) =

1996 album by One More Time

Studio album by One More Time
- Released: 1996
- Genre: pop music, new age

One More Time chronology
One More Time (1994)	Den vilda (1996)	Living in a Dream (1997)

Den vilda is a studio album released by the Swedish pop group One More Time in 1996. The album peaked at number 29 on the Swedish Albums Chart. One year later it was released again with the songs translated into English. The title of the new album was Living in a Dream and the cover art was different. The English version also included a new English version of the song Det vackraste, written by the band members and performed by Cecilia Vennersten at Melodifestivalen 1995.

== Track listing ==
1. Den vilda
2. Kvarnen
3. Skuggan bakom dig
4. De oskattbara
5. Labyrinten
6. Vintergatan
7. Råttfångarn
8. Hela täcket för mig själv
9. Huset
10. Vägskälet
11. Den vilda - forsen om våren

== English version ==
Living in a Dream

Studio album by One More Time
- Released: 1997
- Genre: pop music, new age

One More Time chronology
Den vilda (1996)	Living in a Dream (1997)

=== Track listing ===
The titles of the Swedish versions within brackets.

1. Living in a Dream (Det vackraste)
2. The Wilderness Mistress (Den vilda)
3. Putting on the Charm (Kvarnen)
4. You Will Never Be Alone (Skuggan bakom dig)
5. Invaluable (De oskattbara)
6. The Maze (Labyrinten)
7. Milky Way (Vintergatan)
8. The Whole Quilt All to Myself (Hela täcket för mig själv)
9. The Pied Piper (Råttfångar'n)
10. Crossroads (Vägskälet)
11. The Wilderness Mistress - Rapids in Springtime (Den vilda - forsen om våren)
