= Living the Dream =

Living the Dream or variants may refer to:

== Television and film ==
- Living the Dream (New Zealand TV series), a 2004 New Zealand reality show parody
- Living the Dream (British TV series), a comedy drama series, 2017
- Jonas Brothers: Living the Dream, an American reality series
- "Living the Dream" (Big Little Lies), an episode of the HBO series Big Little Lies
- "Living the Dream" (Dexter), an episode of the American series Dexter
- "Living the Dream" (House), an episode of the American series House
- "Living the Dream" (My Family), an episode of the UK series My Family
- "Livin' the Dream", an episode of the American series The Office
- Living the Dream (film), a 2006 film directed by Christian Schoyen
- Goal II: Living the Dream, a 2007 film

== Music ==
- Living the Dream (Jane McDonald album), 2026
- Living the Dream (Jennylyn Mercado album), 2004
- Living the Dream (Luca Hänni album), 2013
- Livin' the Dream (album), a 2017 album by Nathan Carter
- Living the Dream (Slash album), 2018
- Living the Dream (Uriah Heep album), 2018
- "Livin' the Dream" (Drake White song), 2015
- "Living the Dream" (Five Finger Death Punch song), 2020
- "Livin' the Dream" (Morgan Wallen song), 2020
- Best of: Living the Dream, a 2022 compilation album by Tarja Turunen

== Games ==
- Tomodachi Life: Living the Dream, a 2026 video game released for the Nintendo Switch

== See also ==
- Living a Dream, a 2005 album by Katherine Jenkins
- LTD (disambiguation)
- Living in a Dream (disambiguation)
