= Kjell Eriksson (radio presenter) =

Swedish blogger

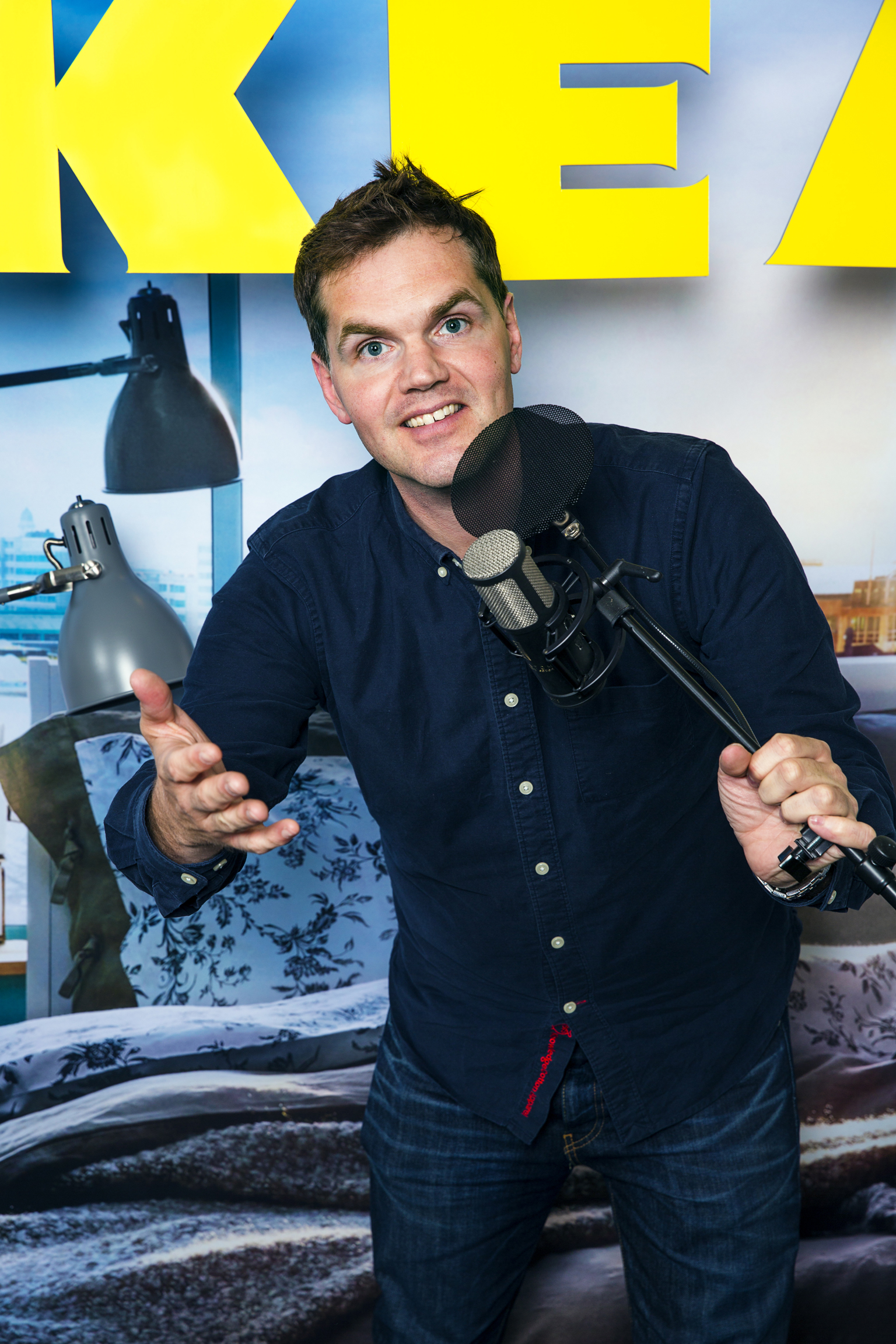
- Kjell Eriksson (2014)
- Born: 27 December 1975 (age 50); Täby, Sweden
- Occupation: Radio presenter

Kjell Mikael Eriksson (born 27 December 1975) is a Swedish radio presenter, television personality, blogger and author. In 2008 he was a regular guest at Vakna! med The Voice which was broadcast both on the radio station The Voice and on Kanal 5. Eriksson also goes by the pseudonyms of "Kjelleman", "Kjell ger igen" and "DumKjell". He has worked on the comedy show Pippirull and has presented the morning show Morgonpasset, and Sovmorgon all of them broadcast on Sveriges Radio. He also has presented the show Långlunch at the local radio Sveriges Radio Stockholm. Eriksson has frequently appeared on commercial television and radio channels such as RIX FM, The Voice, Kanal 5 and TV3. He has also written the biography Kjell, about his upbringing in Täby in the 1980s when he was severely overweight.

== Career ==
Kjell Eriksson became "Radio personality of the Year" in 2002, presented by Radioakademin. He has also won an award in the category "Best morning show on radio", for his work on Morgonpasset. Eriksson has also appeared in the television shows Akta rygg and Humorlabbet both on Sveriges Television (SVT). He presented an episode of the Sveriges Radio show Sommar i P1 on 27 June 2004 discussing his life and career.

In 2007, Eriksson left his employment at Sveriges Radio. In the summer of the same year, along with Paula Haukka, he presented Rix MorronZoo, a morning show on Rix FM. He has also worked as a presenter on the morning show Vakna med The Voice.

In 2008, he reported on Melodifestivalen for Mix Megapol. He took a much publicized photo of singer Carola Häggkvist's underwear during the semi-final in Västerås. The photo caused a lot of attention and full-pages in the tabloids. Eriksson at the time of the publication of the photo said that Häggkvist's dress should burn in hell. Häggkvist has since declined any guest appearance on Vakna med The Voice. He later said that he was terrified to answer his telephone fearing an angry phone call from Häggkvist.

On 12 October 2008, Eriksson was team leader for a team in the TV6 game show Hål i väggen, the Swedish version of Brain Wall along with Pär Lernström and Andreas Ibohm. He has also participated in the Swedish version of Balls of Steel in 2009. He has also participated in the game show Hjälp, jag är med i en japansk tv-show broadcast on TV4. He won the show, but later claimed to have never received the winning prize. With SVT he has been part of the entertainment panel on Fridays on the morning show Gomorron Sverige.

In April 2010, Eriksson published the biography book Kjell, which tells about his childhood, teenage years and his time as a newbie in the entertainment industry.

He also makes references to himself being overweight, and the hard time he experienced gaining acceptance in school. He has also discussed this on the SVT shows Debatt, Fråga doktorn och Go'kväll.

== Bibliography ==
- Pest eller kolera ISBN 91-7588-572-7 (2004)
- Erfarenhetslexikon ISBN 978-91-7588-725-8 (2007)
- Kjell, biography (2009)
