= Alla mina ansikten =

Studio album by Nanne
- Released: April 2001 (March 2002)
- Recorded: 1999, 2000, 2001 (2002)
- Genres: Pop, Rock
- Length: 39:05
- Labels: Somco Records, (SOMCOCD 002)
- Producers: Nanne Grönvall, Peter Grönvall, Bobby Ljunggren, Niceandstinky

Nanne chronology
Cirkus homo sapiens (1998)	Alla mina ansikten (2001)	20 år med Nanne (2005)

Singles from Alla mina ansikten
- 1. "Svarta änkan" Released: March 2000; 2. "Jag har inte tid" Released: October 2000; 3. "Men" Released: March 2001; 4. "Fördomar" Released: September 2001; 5. "Ett vackert par" Released: January 2002

Alla mina ansikten (All my faces) is the second studio album by Swedish singer/songwriter Nanne Grönvall, released in April 2001. The album was re-released in March 2002 with a differently arranged track listing and the bonus track "Ett vackert par", a duet with Nick Borgen.

== Track listing ==
Alla mina ansikten
No.	Title	Lyrics	Music	Title (English translation)	Length
1.	"När mannen kom till jorden"		Peter Grönvall	When the men came to earth	1:16
2.	"E.T. på riktigt"	Nanne Grönvall	Nanne Grönvall, Peter Grönvall	E.T. for real	3:05
3.	"Skam" (with Gina Jacobi)	Nanne Grönvall	Nanne Grönvall	Shame	2:56
4.	"Jag har inte tid"	Nanne Grönvall	Nanne Grönvall, Peter Grönvall	I have no time	3:23
5.	"Hatar, älskar"	Nanne Grönvall	Nanne Grönvall	Hating, loving	4:19
6.	"På en gammal sur och rutten eka"	Erik Hedman	Nanne Grönvall	On an old muddy and rotten rowboat	2:13
7.	"Fördomar"	Nanne Grönvall	Nanne Grönvall, Peter Grönvall	Prejudices	3:53
8.	"Alla mina ansikten"	Nanne Grönvall	Nanne Grönvall, Peter Grönvall	All my faces	3:38
9.	"Svarta änkan"	Nanne Grönvall	Nanne Grönvall, Peter Grönvall	Black widow	3:27
10.	"En ärlig chans"	Nanne Grönvall	Göran Danielsson	A fair chance	3:59
11.	"Men"	Kimberley Rew	Kimberley Rew		3:44
12.	"En hjälpande person"	Louisa Bådagård	Bobby Ljunggren, Nanne Grönvall, Peter Grönvall	A helping person	3:08
Total length:					39:05

Alla mina ansikten: Version 2 (2002)
No.	Title	Lyrics	Music	Title (English translation)	Length
1.	"Alla mina ansikten"	Nanne Grönvall	Nanne Grönvall, Peter Grönvall	All my faces	3:38
2.	"Fördomar"	Nanne Grönvall	Nanne Grönvall, Peter Grönvall	Prejudices	3:53
3.	"Jag har inte tid"	Nanne Grönvall	Nanne Grönvall, Peter Grönvall	I have no time	3:23
4.	"Hatar, älskar"	Nanne Grönvall	Nanne Grönvall	Hating, loving	4:19
5.	"Ekan" (På en gammal sur och rutten eka)	Erik Hedman	Nanne Grönvall	Rowboat	2:13
6.	"Svarta änkan"	Nanne Grönvall	Nanne Grönvall, Peter Grönvall	Black widow	3:27
7.	"En hjälpande person"	Louisa Bådagård	Bobby Ljunggren, Nanne Grönvall, Peter Grönvall	A helping person	3:08
8.	"Men"	Kimberley Rew	Kimberley Rew		3:44
9.	"En ärlig chans"	Nanne Grönvall	Göran Danielsson	A fair chance	3:59
10.	"Ett vackert par" (with Nick Borgen)	Py Bäckman	Micke Wennborn	A beautiful couple	3:04
11.	"Skam" (with Gina Jacobi)	Nanne Grönvall	Nanne Grönvall	Shame	2:56
12.	"När mannen kom till jorden"		Peter Grönvall	When the men came to earth	1:16
13.	"E.T. på riktigt"	Nanne Grönvall	Nanne Grönvall, Peter Grönvall	E.T. for real	3:05
Total length:					42:10
