= Jakob Karlberg =

Swedish singer (born 1994)

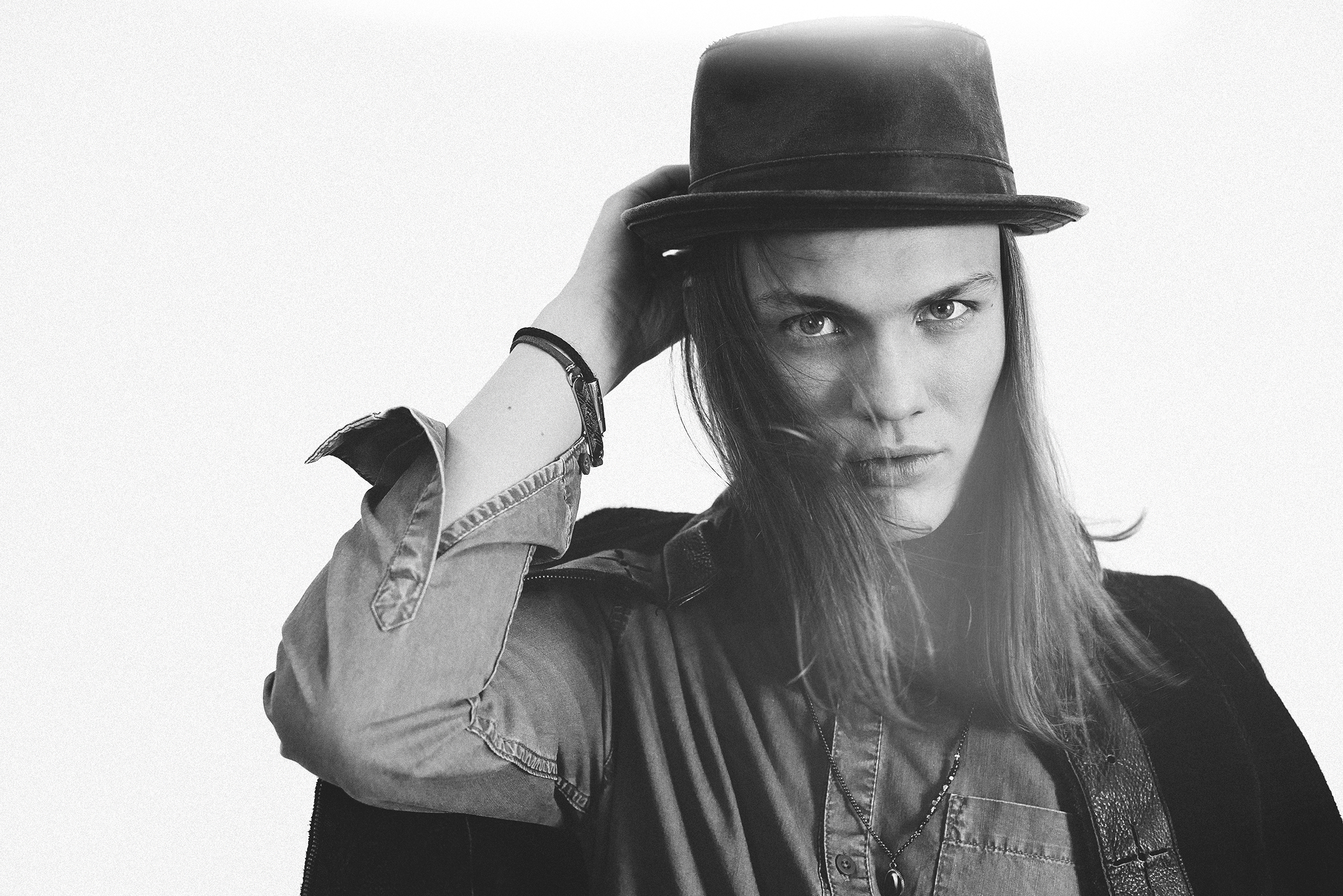
Jakob Karlberg

Jakob Karlberg (born 13 September 1994 in Alingsås) is a Swedish singer. In 2015 he signed with Sony Music, releasing the song "Fan va bra". The song peaked at number 7 on the Swedish single chart. He participated in Melodifestivalen 2020 with the song "Om du tror att jag saknar dig", which peaked at number 70 on the Swedish single chart.

== Discography ==
=== Singles ===
Title	Year	Peak chart positions	Album
Title	Year	SWE	Album
"Fan va bra"	2015	7	Non-album singles
"Fel på dig"	2015	—	Non-album singles
"Haltar"	2016	—	Non-album singles
"Trädgårn"	2016	—	Non-album singles
"Kamrat"	2016	—	Non-album singles
"1990"	2016	—	Non-album singles
"Ta med dig solen"	2017	—	Non-album singles
"Generad"	2018	—	Non-album singles
"Du har kommit nu"	2018	—	Non-album singles
"Jag har aldrig"	2018	—	Non-album singles
"Varje andetag"	2019	—	Non-album singles
"Över mig"	2019	—	Non-album singles
"Din vän"	2019	—	Non-album singles
"Nästa jul"	2019	—	Non-album singles
"Om du tror att jag saknar dig"	2020	70	Non-album singles
"Sluta inte dansa"	2020	—	Non-album singles
