= Wille Crafoord =

Swedish composer and singer

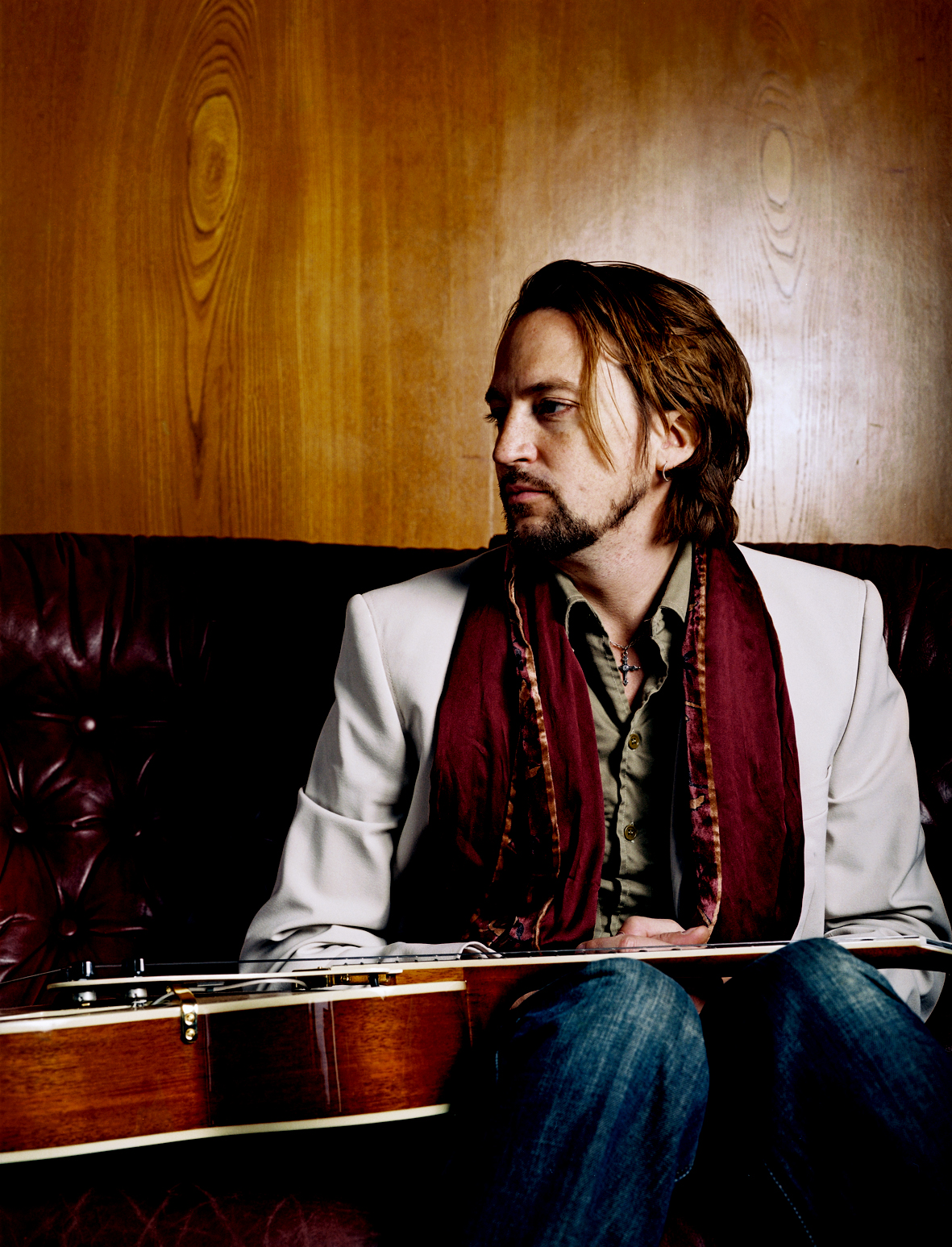
- Born: 8 February 1966 (age 59); Stockholm, Sweden
- Occupation(s): Singer, songwriter, composer
- Known for: Just D, Griniga Gamla Gubbar

Carl-Henning William "Wille" Crafoord (born 8 February 1966) is a Swedish composer, songwriter, singer and rap artist. He became known in the late 1980s for introducing hip hop music in Sweden to a wider audience through his rap group Just D. He was a member of the group between 1989 and 1995. He has released several solo albums, and in 1997 he was awarded the Karamelodiktstipendiet. Just D was awarded the music award Rockbjörnen in 1995. He has twice participated in Melodifestivalen both as a performer and songwriter.

== Early life ==
Crafoord is the son of psychiatrist Clarence Crafoord and Margareta Crafoord.

His paternal grand mother, Elsa, née Kumlin, was a sister to the maternal grand father of English pop singer Leona Naess, making them second cousins.

== Career ==
Along with Peder Ernerot and Gustave Lund he formed the hip hop group Just D and played in it between 1989 and 1996. They were awarded several gold records, Swedish Grammys and a Rockbjörnen award for albums such as Svenska Ord, Rock'n'Roll, Tre Amigos and Plast. Among their music singles were "Juligen", "Relalalaxa", "Hur E D Möjligt?", "Grannar", "Låt D goda rulla", "Vart tog den söta lilla flickan vägen?" and "Tre gringos".

After Just D, Crafoord released the solo albums Samma typ av annorlunda saker, Den där skivan, Om det så går under går det över and Live at Riddarhuset. He has cooperated with musicians like Bo Kaspers Orkester, Nanne Grönvall and Magnus Lindberg, and has appeared in, written and directed several shows like Den Dära Showen, Django & jag and Snurra min jord that were staged at Vasateatern (The Vasa Theatre) between 2008 and 2009.

In 1997, he was awarded the Karamelodiktstipendiet which had been initiated by Povel Ramel. That same year he participated in Melodifestivalen 1997 performing the song "Missarna" and placing third with 65 points. He composed and performed the song "Adam & Eva" for the film of the same name in 1997. In 1999, he won a Swedish Grammy award for Best Lyrics for the songs "Allround", "När träden slår ut" and "Vad gjorde du i de dära rummet?". He returned to Melodifestivalen 2008 as a songwriter with the song "Alla gamla X", which placed eighth, and last, in the first semifinal.

Along with Johan Johansson, Strindbergs and John Lenin, in 2003 he formed the rap group Griniga Gamla Gubbar, and started rapping in Swedish again. In 2004 he wrote the titular music to the series Om Stig Petrés hemlighet, and in 2006 he wrote the music and lyrics and performed the song for the children's TV show Nicke Nyfiken. Crafoord has also worked in television, presenting Grammisgalan in 2005, and Knesset on ZTV in 1995.

In 2008, Crafoord launched the Hovturnén, an annual concert tour where the singers and performers travel by horseback between gigs in Skåne. Among the singers who have participated in the project are: Dogge Doggelito, Bengan Janson, Rickard Söderberg, Tina Ahlin, Arja Saijonmaa, Mikael Samuelson, Monica Silverstrand, Lill Lindfors, Staffan Hellstrand, Anna Bergendahl, Mikael Ramel, Gunhild Carling, Linda Bengtzing, Christer Sandelin, Gunhild Carling, Marika Willstedt, Jonas Sjöblom, Olle Lindner, Dan Hylander, Nanne Grönvall and Gunhild Carling.

== Personal life ==
Crafoord is married to lawyer Karin Crafoord with whom he has two sons. He also has a son from his previous marriage to television personality Josefin Crafoord, and a daughter from his marriage with Sanna Lundell.
