= Highland (song) =

1992 single by One More Time

Single by One More Time

from the album Highland
- B-side: "Vitality"
- Released: 24 September 1992
- Length: 5:22 (complete version); 4:32 (edited version)
- Label: CNR
- Songwriter(s): Nanne Grönvall; Peter Grönvall
- Producer(s): Peter Grönvall

One More Time singles chronology
"Highland" (1992)	"Calming Rain" (1993)

"Highland" is a song performed by Swedish musical group One More Time. The song was written by Nanne Grönvall and Peter Grönvall and released as a single in September 1992. The song became an international hit, peaking at number two on the Swedish Singles Chart and topping Belgium's Ultratop chart for three weeks. The song appears on the group's 1992 debut studio album, Highland.

== Track listings ==
Swedish 7-inch single

A. "Highland" – 5:22
B. "Vitality" – 4:55

European maxi-CD single

1. "Highland" (edited version) – 4:32
2. "Highland" (complete version) – 5:22
3. "Vitality" – 4:55

== Charts ==
=== Weekly charts ===
Chart (1992–1993)	Peak position
Australia (ARIA)	181
Belgium (Ultratop 50 Flanders)	1
Europe (Eurochart Hot 100)	29
Germany (GfK)	39
Netherlands (Dutch Top 40)	18
Netherlands (Single Top 100)	20
Sweden (Sverigetopplistan)	2

=== Year-end charts ===
Chart (1992)	Position
Belgium (Ultratop 50 Flanders)	51
Sweden (Topplistan)	25

Chart (1993)	Position
Belgium (Ultratop 50 Flanders)	77

== Cover versions ==
Blackmore's Night recorded a version of the song for their 2010 album Autumn Sky.
