= One More Time (One More Time album) =

Studio album by One More Time
- Released: 1994
- Genre: pop music

One More Time chronology
Highland (1992)	One More Time (1994)	Den vilda (1996)

One More Time is the second album by the Swedish pop group One More Time and was released in 1994. The album did not continue the international success of the group's first album, and One More Time did not enter the Swedish Albums Chart.

Three songs were released as singles; "Song of Fête", "Get Out" and "The Dolphin". The first song was the only one that entered the Swedish Singles Chart, where it peaked at number 36.

Dazzle Light was a re-recording of a song included on one of Sound of Music's album (both Peter Grönvall and Nanne Grönvall were members of Sound of Music and One More Time).

== Track listing ==
1. Symphony of Doom
2. Get Out
3. The Dolphin
4. Anguish Kept in Secrecy
5. Song of Fête
6. Time
7. Moments of Passion
8. Dazzle Light
9. Chance of a Lifetime
10. Fairytale
