= S-cam =

Part of some heavy vehicle braking systems

An S-cam is part of a braking system used in heavy vehicles such as trucks and wheeled machinery. It consists of a shaft, usually around 4 to 25 inches long, turned at one end by means of an air-powered brake booster and lever with an S-shaped cam at the wheel end. Turning the shaft pushes the brake shoes against the drum, producing friction.

The design allows bulky air cylinders to be located outside of the wheel.

== Uses ==
The S-cam is generally used in heavy trucking applications or commercial vehicles where an air supply is readily available from the vehicle. It is normally powered by air, but hydraulic power can be used too.

The S-cam foundation brake is being used in over 85% of vehicles in the U.S. that run with air brakes.

S-cam's are only used with drum brakes because the cam pushes on the brakes which rubs against the rotating drum, and thus slowing the vehicle. Drum brakes are favored on bigger vehicles because they allow more surface area in brake pads to get a heavier load slowed down more efficiently.

== How it works ==
The driver of the vehicle that is either supplied by hydraulic or air power, presses the brake pedal which sends power to a diaphragm. This diaphragm sends the motion to a push rod that rotates the shaft connected to the S-cam. As the S-cam rotates, the two symmetrical brake pads are forced against the brake drum until the pressure is released and the brake pads return to their resting position.

The principle of the S-cam allows the brakes of big vehicles to be more compact and less moving parts, since it only relies on a rotating shaft. Generally speaking, a tractor trailer requires more brakes than a typical vehicle, so making the brakes as simple and as cost effective as possible is very important.

S-cams are very efficient at keeping brakes maintained because as the brake pad wears, the S-cam rotates more and causes the pads to further. Since the lobes on the S-cam increase in radius as it is turned, the brake pads linear motion is increased. Of course you want to adjust your brakes regularly to ensure there is no slack in your brake system and that your brakes are responsive.

== See also ==
- Cam (mechanism)
- Drum Brake
