= Den vilda =

1996 song performed by One More Time

Single by One More Time
- Language: Swedish
- Released: 1996
- Composer: Peter Grönvall
- Lyricist: Nanne Grönvall

Eurovision Song Contest 1996 entry
- Country: Sweden
- Artists: Maria Rådsten; Nanne Grönvall; Peter Grönvall
- As: One More Time
- Language: Swedish
- Composer: Peter Grönvall
- Lyricist: Nanne Grönvall
- Conductor: Anders Berglund

Finals performance
- Final result: 3rd
- Final points: 100
- ◄ "Se på mej" (1995)
- "Bara hon älskar mig" (1997) ►

Den vilda (meaning "The wild one") is a winter-related song by Swedish band One More Time, written by Peter Grönvall. It won the Melodifestivalen 1996 and hence represented Sweden in the Eurovision Song Contest 1996.

The song was performed as the 23rd and last entry in the contest. At the close of the voting it had received 100 points and placed 3rd out of 23 entries. It also peaked at #7 on the Swedish Singles Chart.

== Charts ==
=== Weekly charts ===
Chart (1996)	Peak position
Sweden (Sverigetopplistan)	7

=== Year-end charts ===
Chart (1996)	Position
Sweden (Sverigetopplistan)	46

== Recordings in other languages ==
- "The Wilderness Mistress" is the English version of "Den vilda", released by One More Time in 1996.
- "Dansaðu vindur" is an Icelandic cover released by Eivør Pálsdóttir in the 2008 album Frostrósir – Heyr Himnasmiður.

Preceded by "Se på mej" by Jan Johansen	Melodifestivalen winners 1996	Succeeded by "Bara hon älskar mig" by Blond
