= The Voice of Hiphop & RnB =

Swedish radio station

The Voice of Hiphop & RnB, also known as The Voice, is a defunct radio station in Sweden. It was broadcast in Stockholm on 105.9, in Malmö on 106.1, and in Göteborg on 107.8. It was owned by SBS Radio, a subsidiary of ProSiebenSat.1 Media, along with Mix Megapol and Rockklassiker.

As of 2013, the lineup of presenters on The Voice included Stefan Lissol in the morning, Felix Andersson in the afternoon, and Daniel Hübinette in the evenings. The station was in operation through May 2016.
