= Maria Rådsten =

Musical artist

- Born: Ingela Maria Kristina Rådsten; 6 April 1966 (age 59)
- Genres: ethnopop
- Occupation: singer

Ingela Maria Kristina Rådsten-Ekman (born 6 April 1966) is a Swedish singer.

She began her musical career with the group Peter's Pop Squad. Later, she would become part of One More Time, with which she achieved great international success.

She has participated four times in the Melodifestivalen:

- As a solo artist in Melodifestivalen 1992, with the song "Vad som än händer" ("Whatever Happens"), achieving third place.
- As a songwriter in Melodifestivalen 1995, as the author of the song "Det Vackraste" ("The Most Beautiful Thing"), finishing at second place.
- With One More Time in Melodifestivalen 1996, with the song "Den Vilda" ("The Savage"), winning the contest and later participating in the Eurovision Song Contest 1996, where they reached third place.
- In Melodifestivalen 2003, in the choir behind Nanne Grönvall and her song "Evig Kärlek" ("Eternal Love").

In 2003, she released a new single called "Head Over Heels", as a calling card of sorts for her new album. However, the album's release was canceled, after more than seven years of work.
