= Det vackraste =

Single by Cecilia Vennersten
- Released: 1995
- Songwriters: Nanne Grönvall; Peter Grönvall; Maria Rådsten

"Det vackraste" (lit. "The Most Beautiful Thing" eng. "Living in a Dream") is a Swedish love song. It was originally sung by Swedish pop singer Cecilia Vennersten and finished second in the Melodifestivalen 1995, the Swedish selections for Eurovision Song Contest. The song was released as a single and stayed 47 weeks in the Swedish singles chart total, including seven weeks at number-one. It also stayed at Svensktoppen for 26 weeks during the period 29 April-21 October 1995, with 3rd place as best result there. The song was awarded a Swedish Grammy Award, Grammis, for Best Song of 1995. In Norway, "Det vackraste" peaked at number 2.

The song is written by Nanne Grönvall, Peter Grönvall and Maria Rådsten. They also form the pop group One More Time, and they recorded the song with English lyrics in 1997, called "Living in a Dream".

In 1999, Belgian artist Dana Winner recorded another English version of the song, now named "I'll Sing a Song Today", about nature.

In 2005, ten years after the original performance by Cecilia Vennersten, a cover version of the original lyrics was recorded by Swedish dansband and schlager singer Lotta Engberg on her album Kvinna & man.

== Chart ==
=== Weekly charts ===
| Chart (1995–1996) | Peak position |
|---|---|
| Europe (Eurochart Hot 100) | 40 |
| Norway (VG-lista) | 2 |
| Sweden (Sverigetopplistan) | 1 |

=== Year-end charts ===
| Chart (1995) | Position |
|---|---|
| Sweden (Topplistan) | 3 |

== Certifications ==
| Region | Certification | Certified units/sales |
|---|---|---|
| Sweden (GLF) | Platinum | 50,000^{^} |
^{^} Shipments figures based on certification alone.
