= Highland (album) =

Studio album by One More Time
- Released: 1992
- Recorded: 1991–1992
- Genre: Pop
- Length: 46:29
- Label: Ultrapop, CNR
- Producer: Peter Grönvall, Ulf Söderberg

One More Time chronology
| Highland (1992) | One More Time (1994) |

Highland is the debut studio album by Swedish group One More Time, released in 1992. In 1992, they began their international career with the release of the single "Highland", which peaked at number two in Sweden.

== Track listing ==
All tracks are written by Peter Grönvall, Ulf Söderberg & Nanne Nordqvist, except where noted.

Original track listing
| No. | Title | Length |
|---|---|---|
| 1. | "Highland" | 5:21 |
| 2. | "Calming Rain" | 4:14 |
| 3. | "No One Else Like You" | 4:04 |
| 4. | "Turn Out the Light" | 4:34 |
| 5. | "No Romance" (Grönvall, Söderberg, Nordqvist, Angelique Widengren) | 4:35 |
| 6. | "Ghostwarning" | 0:47 |
| 7. | "Here Comes the Ghost" | 4:09 |
| 8. | "Don't Believe Them" | 4:27 |
| 9. | "Tonight" | 4:13 |
| 10. | "Vitality" | 4:47 |
| 11. | "I'll Show You Wonders" | 4:11 |
| 12. | "Autumn Hymn" | 1:07 |

2005 re-release track listing
| No. | Title | Length |
|---|---|---|
| 1. | "Highland" | 5:21 |
| 2. | "Calming Rain" | 4:14 |
| 3. | "Ghostwarning" | 0:47 |
| 4. | "Here Comes the Ghost" | 4:09 |
| 5. | "Tonight" | 4:13 |
| 6. | "Vitality" | 4:47 |
| 7. | "Turn Out the Light" | 4:34 |
| 8. | "No One Else Like You" | 4:04 |
| 9. | "No Romance" (Grönvall, Söderberg, Nordqvist, Angelique Widengren) | 4:35 |
| 10. | "Don't Believe Them" | 4:27 |
| 11. | "I'll Show You Wonders" | 4:11 |
| 12. | "Autumn Hymn" | 1:07 |

== Charts ==
| Chart (1992–1993) | Peak position |
|---|---|
| Swedish Albums (Sverigetopplistan) | 19 |
