= Cecilia Vennersten =

Swedish soulpop and schlager singer

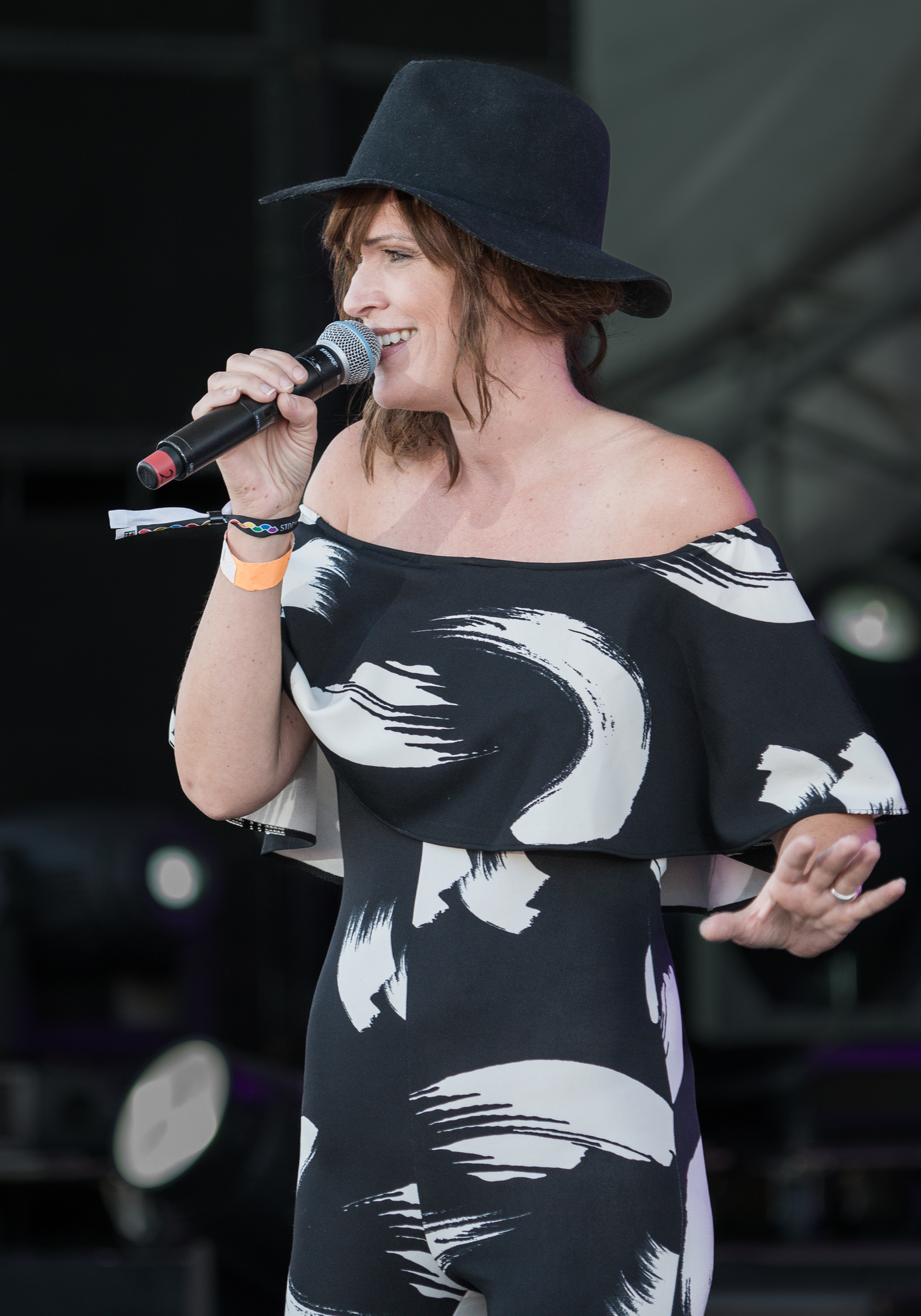
- Cecilia Vennersten performing live in July 2014

Background information
- Born: 26 September 1970 (age 55); Gothenburg, Sweden
- Genres: Schlager; Soul pop
- Occupation: singer
- Years active: 1994–

Cecilia Birgitta Vennersten-Ingemansson (born 26 September 1970) is a Swedish pop singer.

Cecilia Vennersten performed the Mariah Carey song "Hero" on Sikta mot stjärnorna in 1994.

Her career started with a second place finish in the Swedish qualifier for the Eurovision Song Contest with the song "Det vackraste". Her first album, named Cecilia Vennersten, released the same year, was a great success in Sweden and Norway. In 1997, her second album, Till varje leende, en tår, was released. She participated in Melodifestivalen 2005 with the ballad "Var mig nära", but she didn't qualify for the final. In 2006, her third album, Under stjärnornas parasoll, was released.

== Discography ==
=== Albums ===
Title	Year
Cecilia Vennersten	1995
Till varje leende, en tår	1997
Under stjärnornas parasoll	2006

Preceded by Gladys del Pilar	OGAE Second Chance Contest winner 1995	Succeeded by Lotta Engberg
