= Paul Rein =

Swedish songwriter

Paul Rein (born Pauli Kaj Olavi Reinikainen, May 20, 1965) is a Swedish songwriter and music producer based in Stockholm. He was also a singer in the 1980s. He released Italo disco singles such as "Lady-O", "Hold Back Your Love", "Stop (Give It Up)" and "Touch".

Rein is well known within the music industry for his hit songs which have enjoyed success on the Billboard charts, performed by vocalists such as Christina Aguilera ("Come On Over"), Jessica Simpson ("I've Got My Eyes on You"), Victoria Beckham, Mandy Moore, H & Claire, No Angels and Nikki Webster.

== Early life ==
Rein was born in Danderyd, and he has Finnish roots in Jyväskylä.
