= One More Time (band) =

Swedish folk music/pop group

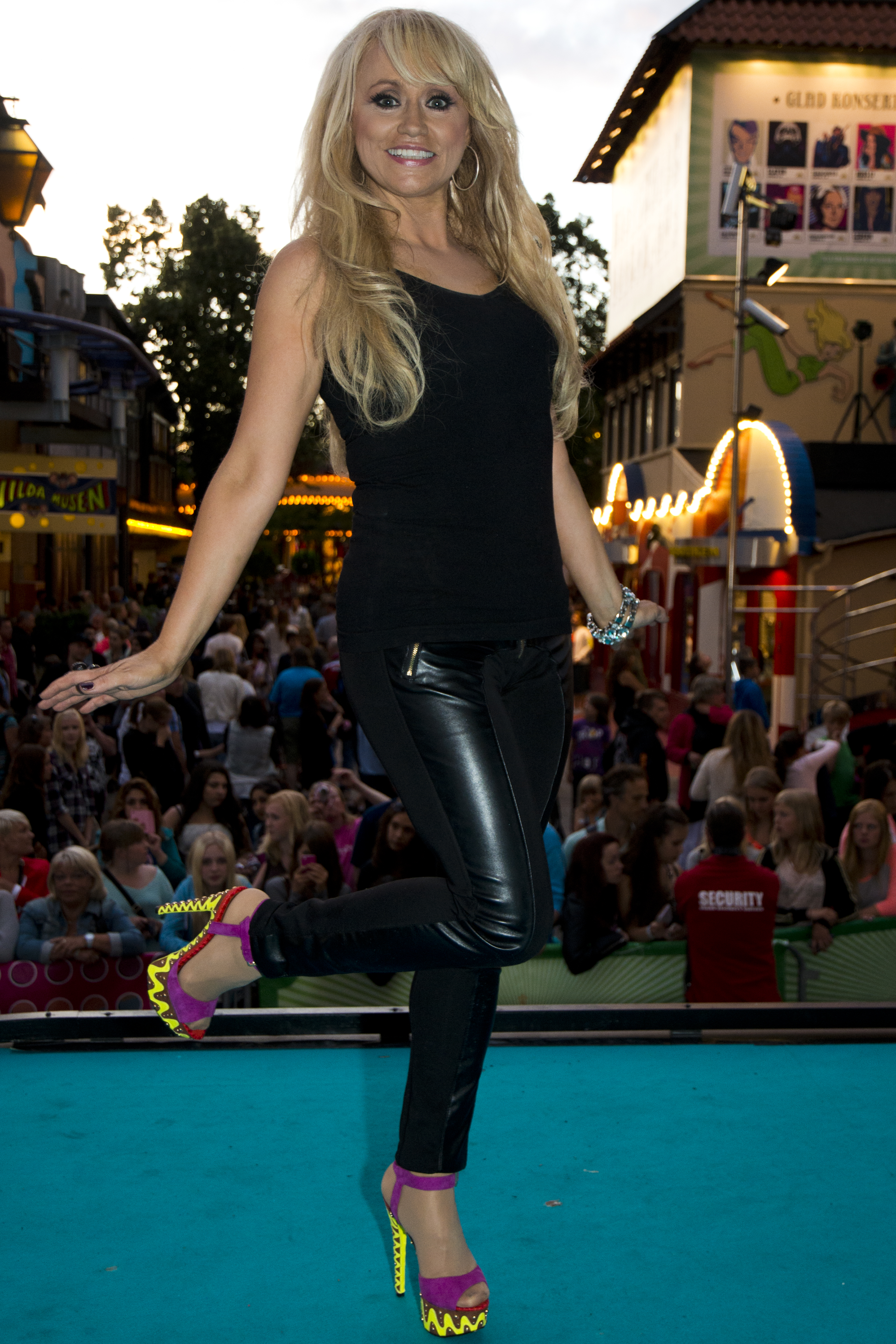

Background information
- Origin: Stockholm, Sweden
- Genres: Pop
- Years active: 1991–1997, 2021-present
- Labels: Somco Music Group (present), Sony Music, CNR
- Members: Nanne Grönvall; Maria Rådsten; Peter Grönvall
- Past members: Thérèse Löf

One More Time is a Swedish pop group, formed in 1991. Its members are Peter Grönvall, his wife Nanne Grönvall and Maria Rådsten. A fourth member, Thérèse Löf, left the group shortly after the first album was released.

== Career ==
In 1992, they began their international career with the release of the single "Highland", which peaked at No. 1 in Belgium, No. 2 in Sweden, and the top 80 in several countries in Europe, such as the Netherlands and Germany. The Highland album, on which the single was featured, went gold in South Africa. Their second self-titled album, which followed in 1994, was not as successful as the previous album. But the third album, their first in Swedish, was a successful reentry to the Swedish charts in 1996. They also released an English version of the album. The group toured frequently in Europe for several years, but in 1998, they decided not to tour abroad anymore, since they wanted to be present at home for their, by that time, small kids.

In the summer of 2021, One More Time announced that the band will reunite after a 24-year break.

Nanne Grönvall has had a successful solo career in Sweden since her first solo album was released in 1998.

Peter Grönvall is the son of ABBA's Benny Andersson.

== Eurovision Song Contest ==
One More Time has participated in Melodifestivalen, the Swedish selections for the Eurovision Song Contest, twice. At the Melodifestivalen 1995, they entered as composers of the ballad "Det vackraste" ("The Most Beautiful Thing"), performed by Cecilia Vennersten. The song was runner-up of Jan Johansen's "Se på mig". "Det vackraste" was awarded a Grammis for Best Song of 1995. The group later recorded the song in English, entitled "Living in a Dream". At Melodifestivalen 1996, the group composed and performed the ethno ballad "Den vilda" ("The Savage"), which won the selections and propelled them to third place in the Eurovision Song Contest 1996 in Oslo, Norway.

== Band members ==
- Peter Grönvall (1991–1997)
- Nanne Grönvall (1991–1997)
- Maria Rådsten (1991–1997)
- Thérèse Löf (1991–1992)

== Discography ==
=== Albums ===
- Highland (1992)
- One More Time (1994)
- Den vilda (1996)
- Living in a Dream (1997)
- The Best Of One More Time (1998, only released in South Africa)

=== Singles ===
- Highland (1992)
- Calming Rain (1993)
- Turn Out the Light (1993)
- No One Else Like You (1993)
- Song of Fête (1994)
- Get Out (1994)
- The Dolphin (1994)
- Den vilda (1996)
- Kvarnen (1996)
- The Wilderness Mistress (1996)
- Living in a Dream (1997)

== Awards and achievements ==
- Grammis ("Det Vackraste" – Song of the year 1995) (One More Time composed and produced the song)
- Grammis nominees ("Den Vilda" – Song of the year 1996)
- Sångfågeln – Winners of Melodifestivalen 1996, the Swedish pre-selection for Eurovision Song Contest with "Den Vilda" (3rd place in Eurovision)
- Gold selling single and album "Highland" in South Africa, 1994
- Gold and Platinum selling single and album "Det Vackraste", 1996 – composers and producers of both single and album
- Diamond Awards in Belgium, International Group of the Year 1992
- Melodifestivalens Hall of Fame 2020

Awards and achievements
Preceded by Jan Johansen with "Se på mig"	Sweden in the Eurovision Song Contest; 1996	Succeeded by Blond with "Bara hon älskar mig"
