= List of petroglyph sites =

This list contains notable petroglyphs, or rock engravings, around the world.

== Africa ==
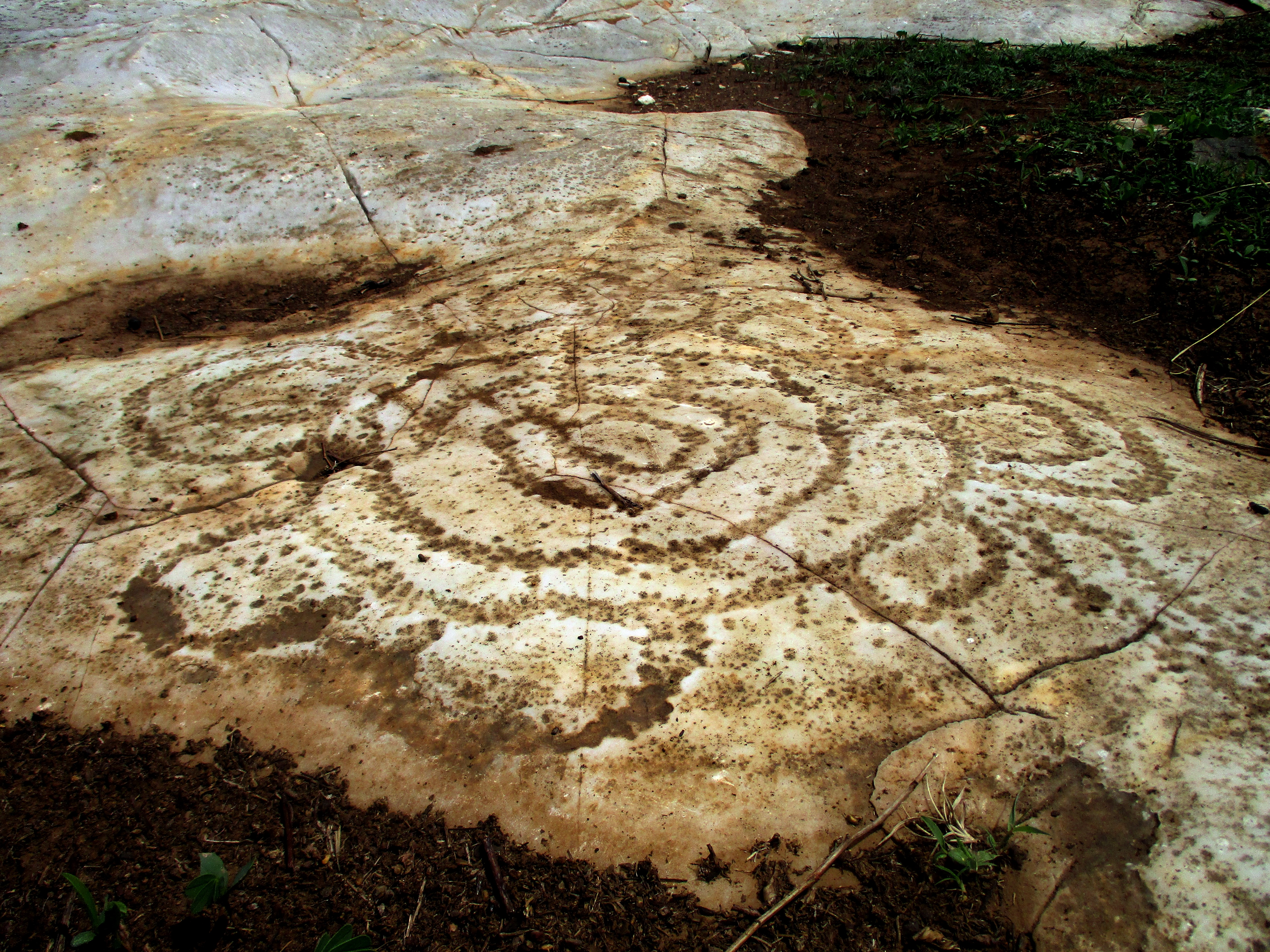
A petroglyph in Bidzar, Cameroon

=== Algeria ===
- Tassili n'Ajjer

=== Cameroon ===
- Bidzar

=== Central African Republic ===
- Bambari, Lengo and Bangassou in the south; Bwale in the west
- Toulou
- Djebel Mela
- Koumbala

=== Chad ===
- Niola Doa

=== Republic of the Congo ===
- The Niari Valley, 250 km south west of Brazzaville

=== Egypt ===
- Qurta, on the east bank of the Nile River in the upper Nile valley, has Nubian Sandstone formations featuring the first and earliest known examples of petroglyphs in the region of North Africa, dating back to 19–15,000 years BP
- Wadi Hammamat in Qift, many carvings and inscriptions dating from before the earliest Egyptian Dynasties to the modern era, including the only painted petroglyph known from the Eastern Desert and drawings of Egyptian reed boats dated to 4000 BCE
- Inscription Rock in South Sinai, is a large rock with carvings and writings ranging from Nabatean to Latin, Ancient Greek and Crusader eras located a few miles from the Ain Hudra Oasis. A second rock sites approximately 1 km from the main rock near the Nabatean tombs of Nawamis with carvings of animals including Camels, Gazelles and others. The original archaeologists who investigated these in the 1800s have also left their names carved on this rock.
- Giraffe petroglyphs found in the region of Gebel el-Silsila. The rock faces have been used for extensive quarrying of materials for temple building especially during the period specified as the New Kingdom. The Giraffe depictions are located near a stela of the king Amenhotep IV. The images are not dated, but they are probably dated from the Predynastic periods.

=== Ethiopia ===
- Tiya

=== Gabon ===
- Ogooue River Valley
- Epona
- Elarmekora
- Kongo Boumba
- Lindili
- Kaya Kaya

=== Libya ===
- Akakus
- Jebel Uweinat

=== Morocco ===
- The Draa River valley.
- Taouz.
- Akka
- Smara

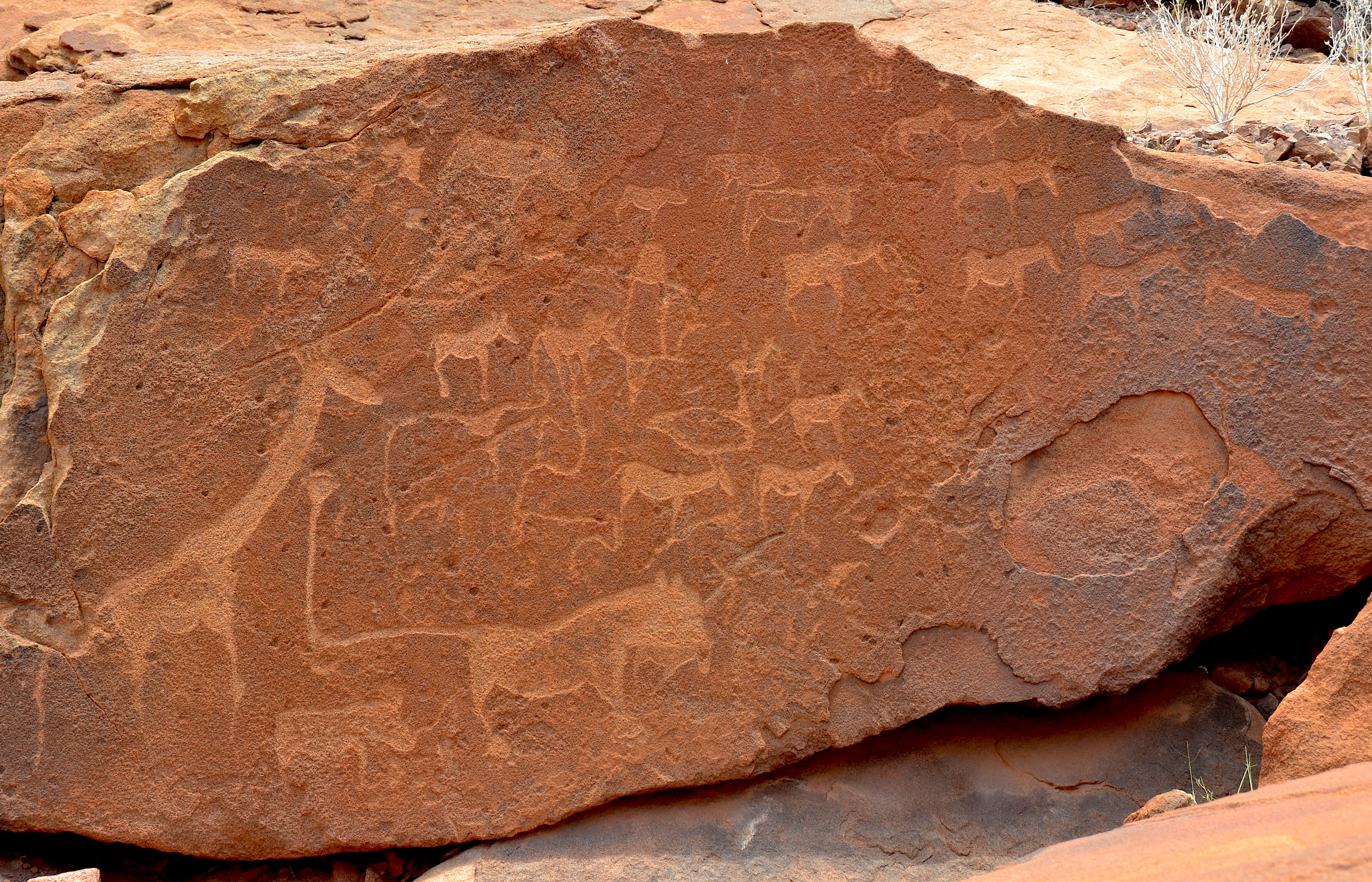
Lion Plate at Twyfelfontein in Namibia (2014)

=== Namibia ===
- Twyfelfontein

=== Niger ===
- Life-size giraffe carvings on Dabous Rock, Aïr Mountains

=== Nigeria ===
- Igbara Oke Petroglyphs
- Birnin kudu rock site

=== South Africa ===
- Driekops Eiland near Kimberley
- ǀXam and ǂKhomani heartland in the Karoo, Northern Cape
- Wildebeest Kuil Rock Art Centre near Kimberley, Northern Cape
- Keiskie near Calvinia, Northern Cape

Tunisia

- Ouesslat Mountain, Ain Kanfous and Zamla
- Tameghza
- The Tataouine Region, in particular Ghomrassen and Smar

=== Zambia ===
- Nyambwezi Falls in the north-west province

== Asia ==
=== Armenia ===
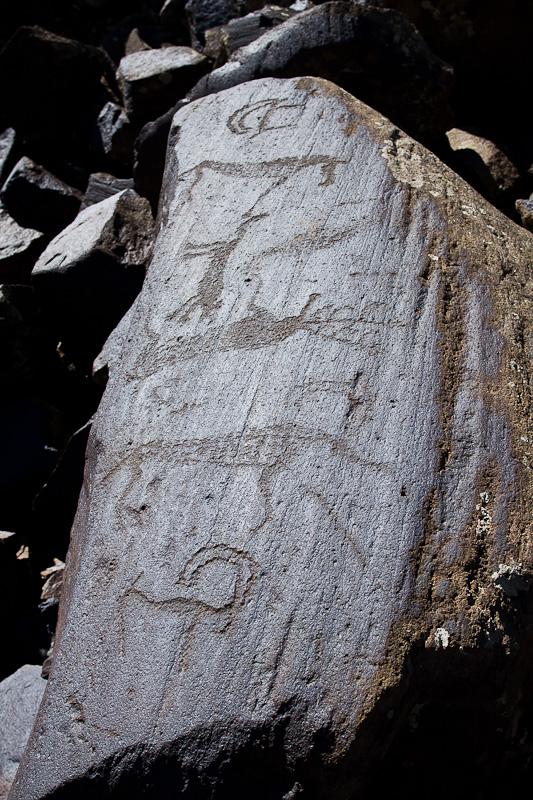
Petroglyphs at Ughtasar, Armenia

- Ughtasar
- Paytasar
- Urtsadzor
- Aragats
- Gegham mountains
- Vardenis ridge
- See also Armenian Eternity sign

=== Azerbaijan ===
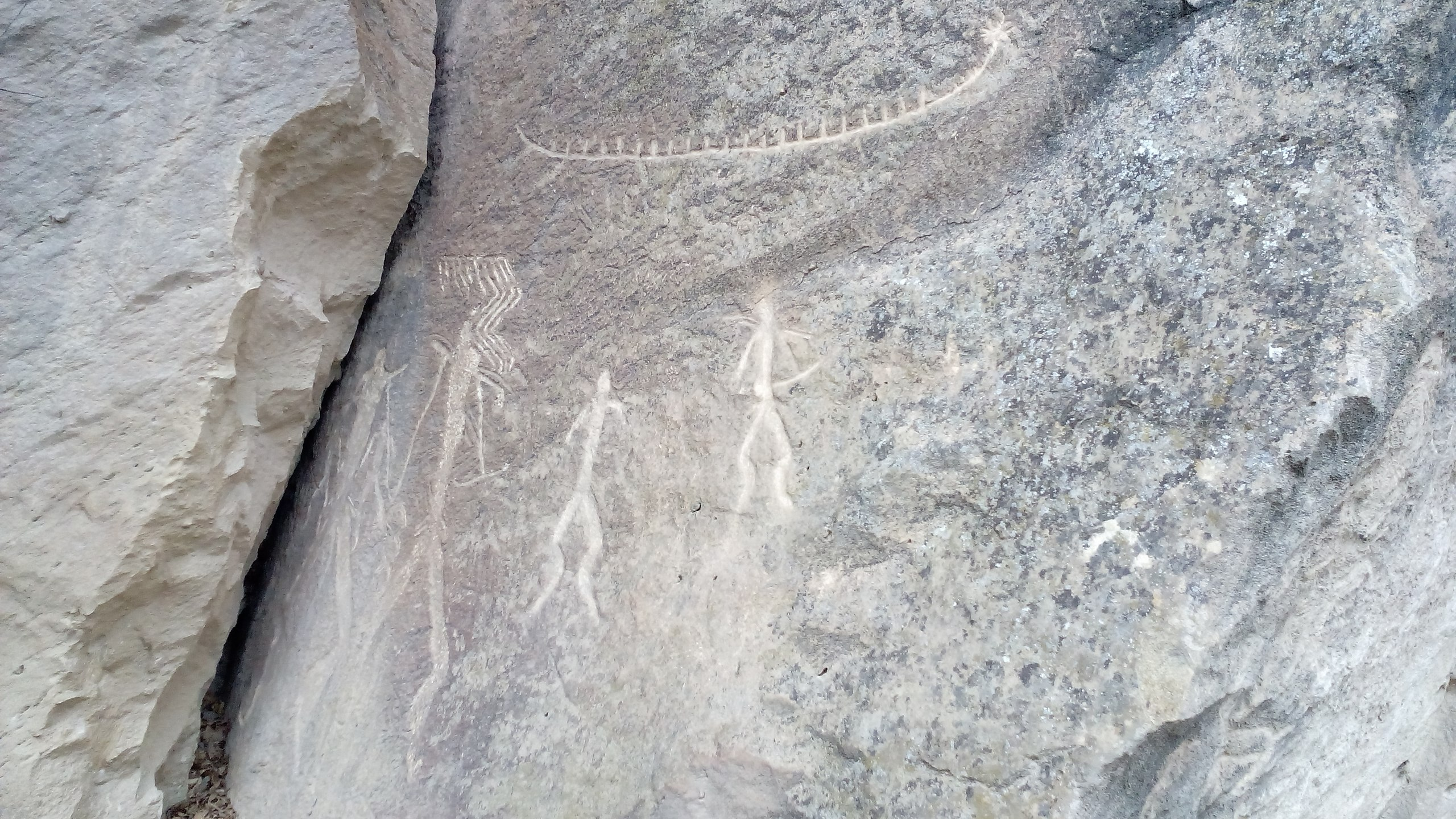
Petroglyphs at Gobustan, Azerbaijan

- Gobustan State Historical and Cultural Reserve
- Gemigaya
- Kalbajar
- Northern Absheron

=== China ===
- Helan Mountains in Yinchuan
- Hua'an Engravings
- Kangjia shimenzi in Xinjiang
- Lianyungan Rock Engravings
- Petroglyphs in Zhuhai
- Yin Mountains in Inner Mongolia
- Chifeng Petroglyphs in Inner Mongolia

=== Georgia ===
- Trialeti petroglyphs

=== Hong Kong ===
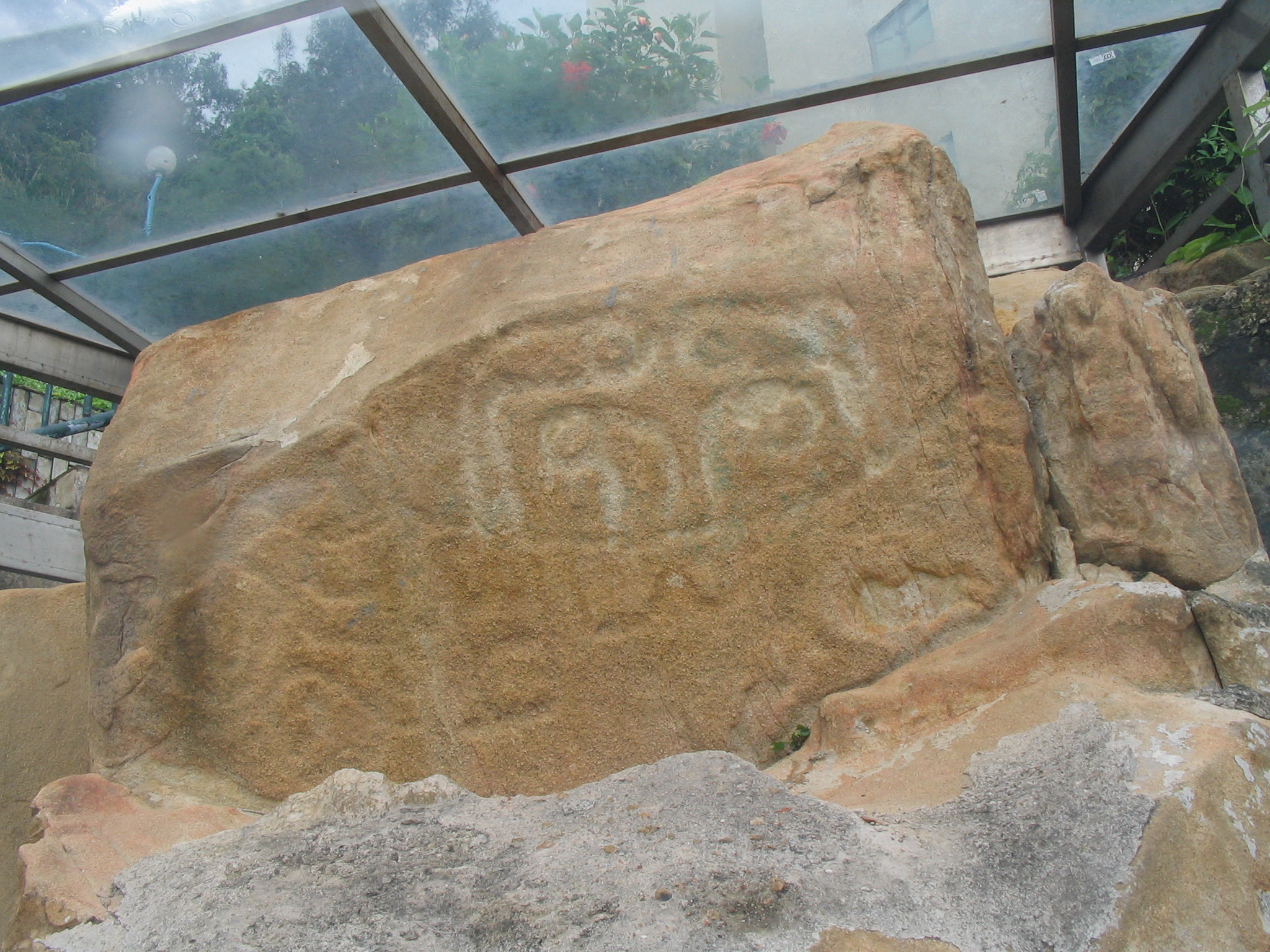
Rock carving on Cheung Chau Island, Hong Kong

Eight sites in Hong Kong:

- Tung Lung Island
- Kau Sai Chau
- Po Toi Island
- Cheung Chau
- Shek Pik on Lantau Island
- Wong Chuk Hang and Big Wave Bay on Hong Kong Island
- Lung Ha Wan in Sai Kung

=== India ===
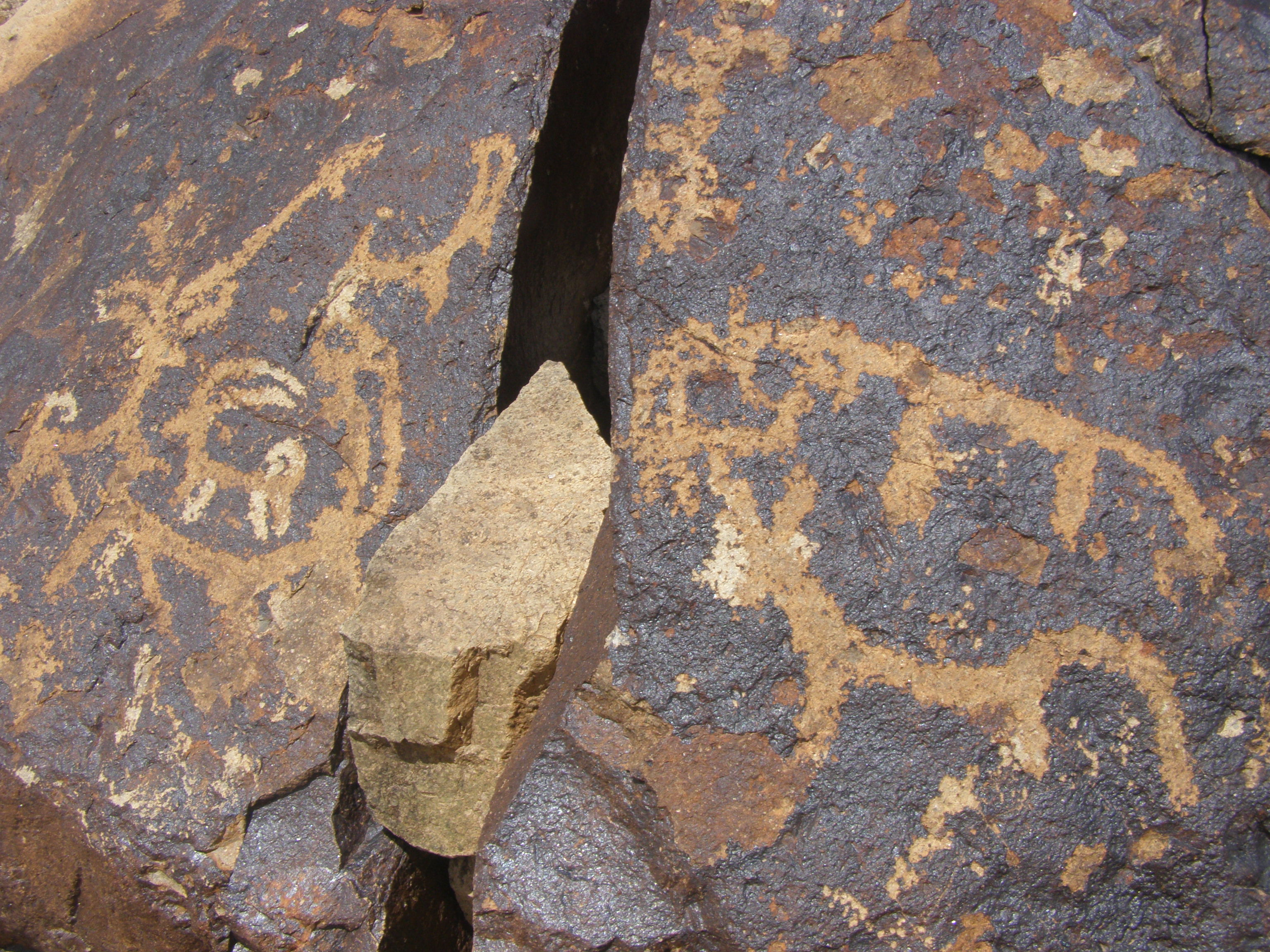
Petroglyphs in Ladakh, India

- Bhimbetka rock shelters, Raisen District, Madhya Pradesh, India.
- Yogimatha rock painting , Nuapada District, Odisha, India.
- Kupgal petroglyphs on Dolerite Dyke, near Bellary, Karnataka, India.
- Kudopi, Sindhudurg District, Maharashtra, India.
- Konkan Petroglyphs, Ratnagiri, Maharashtra, India.
- Hiwale, Sindhudurg District, Maharashtra, India.
- Barsu, Ratnagiri District, Maharashtra, India.
- Devihasol, Ratnagiri District, Maharashtra, India
- Edakkal Caves, Wayanad District, Kerala, India.
- Kollur, Villupuram, Tamil Nadu 35 km from Villupuram in Tamil Nadu. A large dolmen with four petroglyphs that portray men with trident and a wheel with spokes has been found. The discovery was made by K.T. Gandhirajan. This is the second instance when a dolmen with petrographs has been found in Tamil Nadu, India. In October 2018, petroglyphs were discovered in the Ratnagiri and Rajapur areas in the Konkan region of western Maharashtra. Those rock carvings which might date back to 10,000 BC, depict animals like hippopotamuses and rhinoceroses which are not found in that region of India. Some carving depicts, what appears to be Pisces constellation.

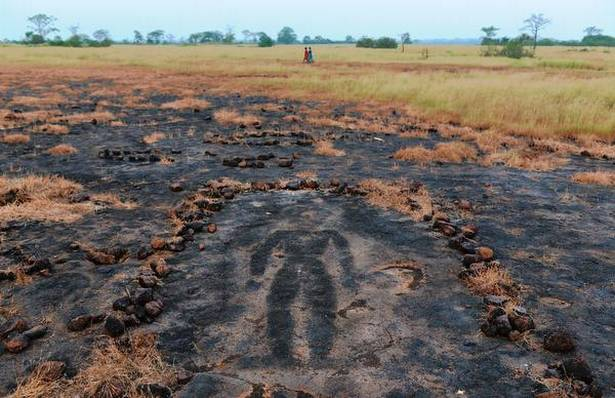
Goddess Lajja Gauri, portrayed squatting and with legs facing outward

- Perumukkal, Tindivanam District, Tamil Nadu, India.
- Unakoti near Kailashahar in North Tripura District, Tripura, India.
- Usgalimal rock engravings, Kushavati river banks, in Goa
- Ladakhi rock art in Ladakh, NW Indian Himalaya.
- Ratnagiri Maharashtra Petroglyphs, An 8-foot (2.4 m)-long petroglyph in Devache Gothane village in Rajapur district, Maharashtra
- Kethaiyurumpu, Tamil Nadu. Situated 28 km north west of Dindigal, Tamil Nadu nearby Idaiyakottai and six km south west of Oddanchartam has revealed several petroglyphs mostly represent abstract symbols on two rocks, which looks like a temporary rock shelter were noticed adjacent to a Murugan temple which is in ruins on top of the Kothaiyurumbu hill

=== Iran ===
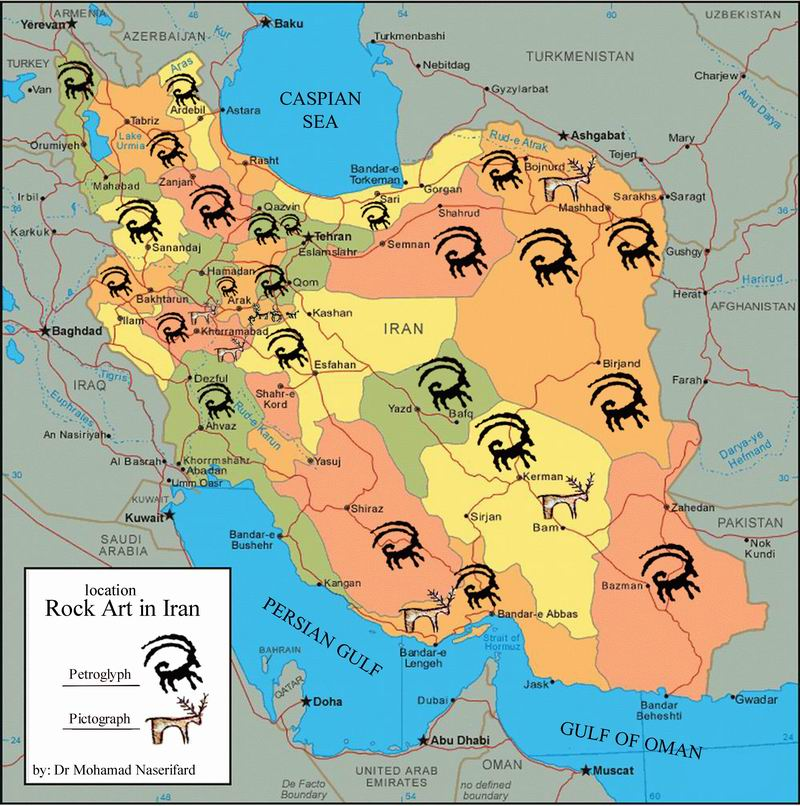
Map of petroglyphs and pictographs of Iran

During recent years a large number of rock carvings has been identified in different parts of Iran. The vast majority depict the ibex. Rock drawings were found in December 2016 near Golpayegan, Iran, which may be the oldest drawings discovered, with one cluster possibly 40,000 years old. Accurate estimations were unavailable due to US sanctions.

The oldest pictographs in Iran are seen in Yafteh cave in Lorestan that date back 40,000 and the oldest petroglyph discovered belongs to Timareh dating back to 40,800 years ago.

Iran provides demonstrations of script formation from pictogram, ideogram, linear (2300 BC) or proto Elamite, geometric old Elamite script, Pahlevi script, Arabic script (906 years ago), Kufi script, and Farsi script back to at least 250 years ago. More than 50000 petroglyphs have been discovered, extended over all Iran's states.

=== Israel ===
- Kibbutz Ginosar
- Har Karkom
- Negev

=== Japan ===
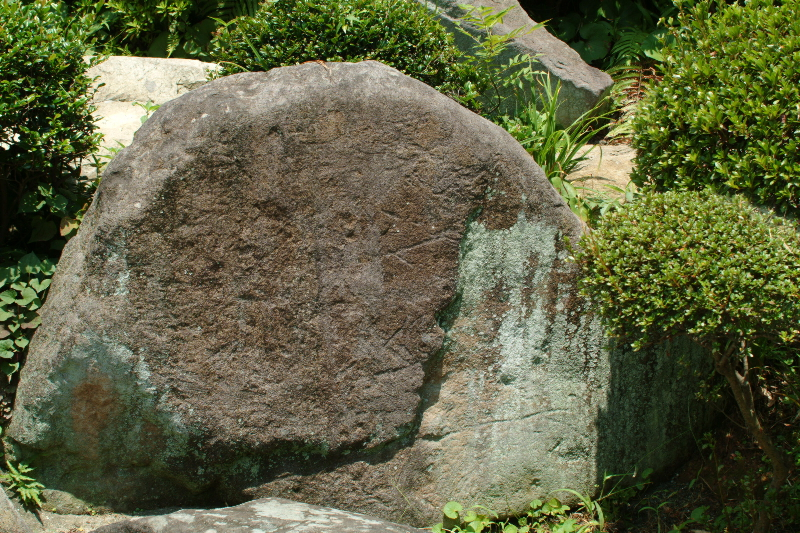
Petroglyph found in Awashima shrine (Japan)

- Awashima shrine (Kitakyūshū city)
- Fugoppe Cave, Hokkaido
- Hikoshima (Shimonoseki city)
- Miyajima
- Temiya cave (Otaru city)

=== Jordan ===
- Wadi Rum
- Wadi Faynan

=== Kazakhstan ===
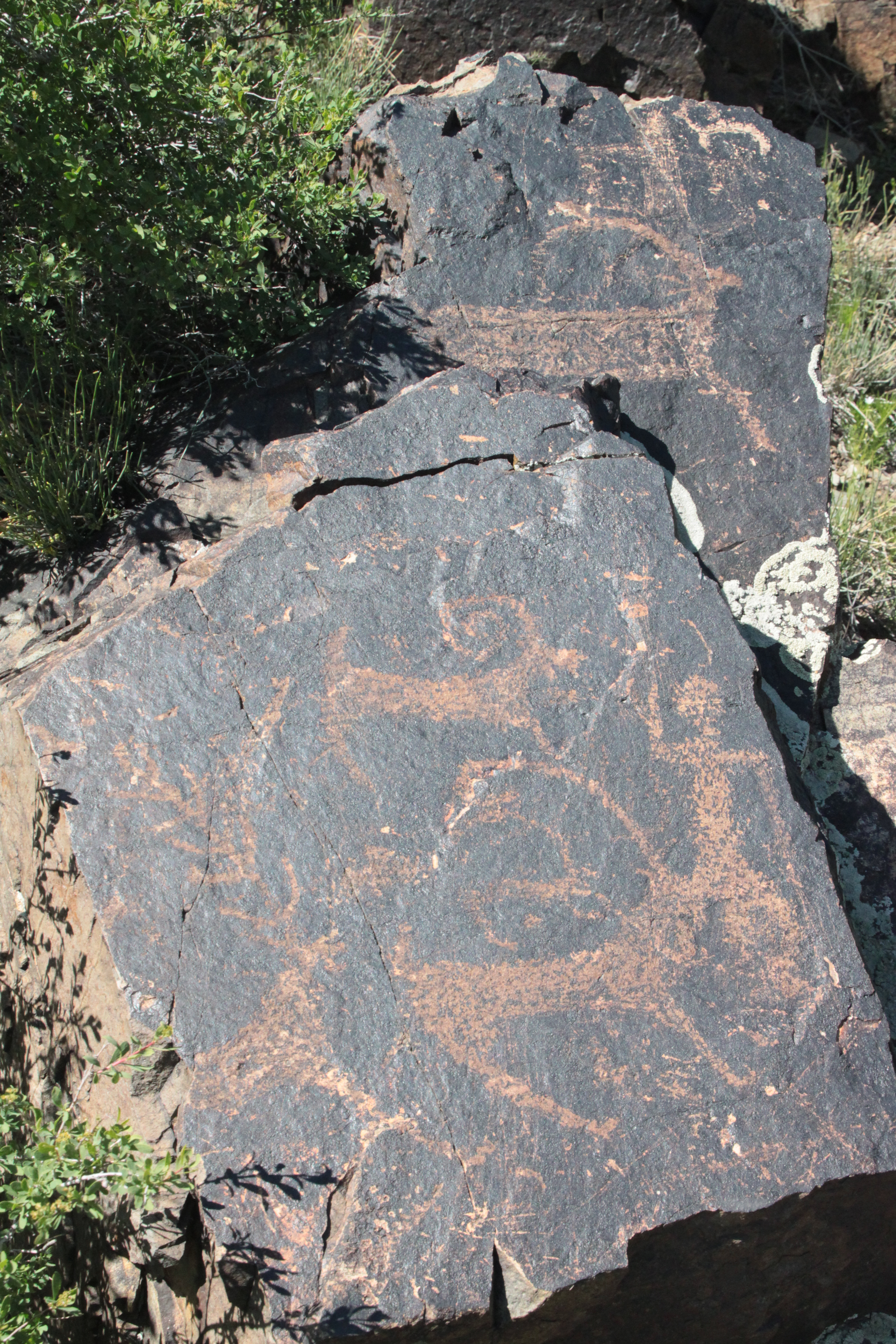
Hunting scene in Koksu, Kazakhstan

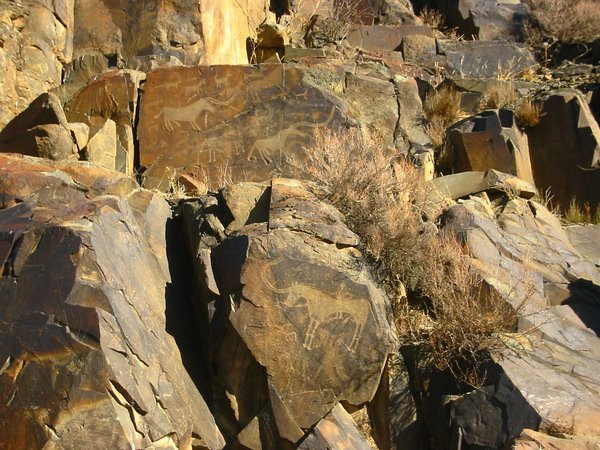
Tamgaly petroglyphs in Kazakhstan

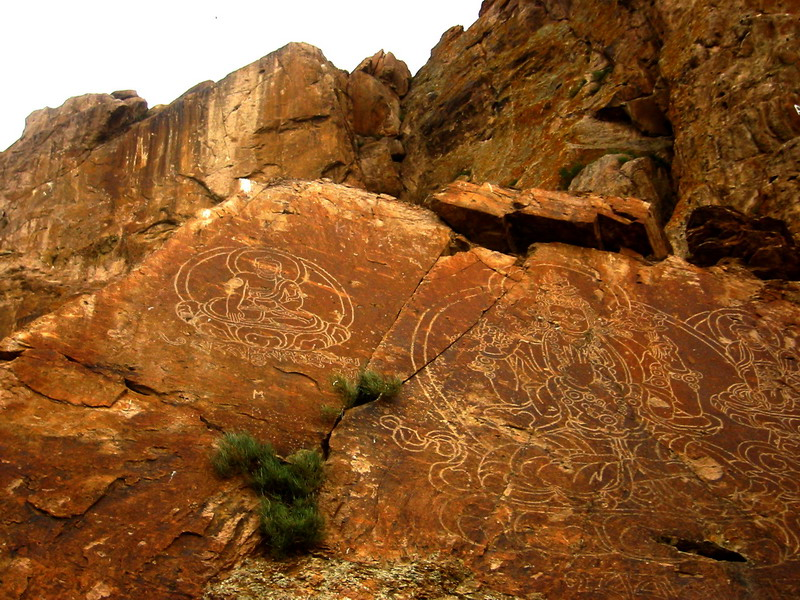
Buddhist carvings at Ili River, Kazakhstan

- Koksu River, in Almaty Province
- Chumysh River basin,
- Tamgaly Tas on the Ili River
- Tamgaly – a World Heritage Site nearly of Almaty

=== Kyrgyzstan ===
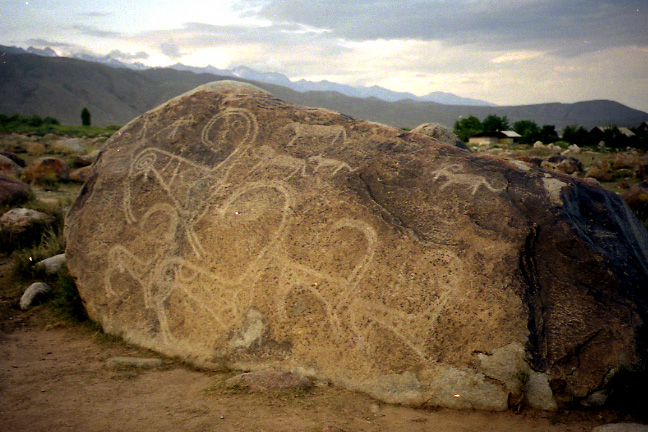
Petroglyphs at Cholpon-Ata in Kyrgyzstan

- Several sites in the Tien Shan mountains: Cholpon-Ata, the Talas valley, Saimaluu Tash, and on the rock outcrop called Suleiman's Throne in Osh in the Fergana valley

=== Laos ===
- Plain of Jars

=== South Korea ===
- Bangudae Petroglyphs

=== Macau ===
- Coloane

=== Malaysia ===
- Lumuyu Petroglyphs

=== Mongolia ===
- Petroglyphic Complexes of the Mongolian Altai, UNESCO World Heritage site, 2011
- Petroglyphs found in the area of Bayan-Ovoo.

=== Pakistan ===
- Ancient Rock Carvings of Sindh
- Rock art and petroglyphs in Northern Areas,

=== Philippines ===
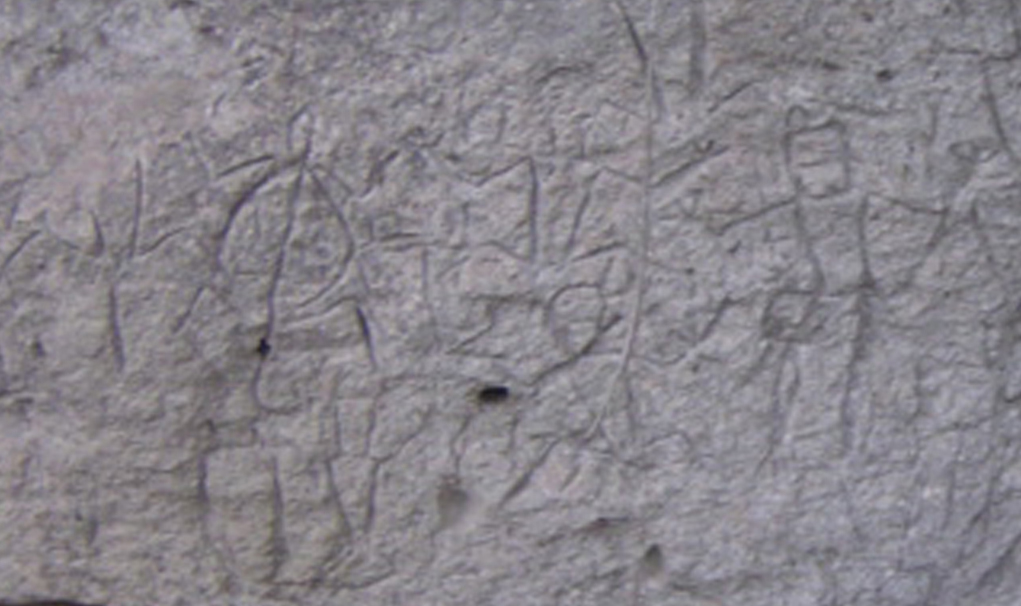
Petroglyphs on a rock wall found in the Sierra Madre mountain range, Rizal, Philippines

- Angono Petroglyphs of Rizal, Philippines

=== Saudi Arabia ===
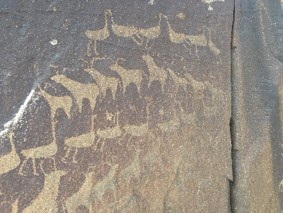
Petroglyphs at Wadi Qarn.

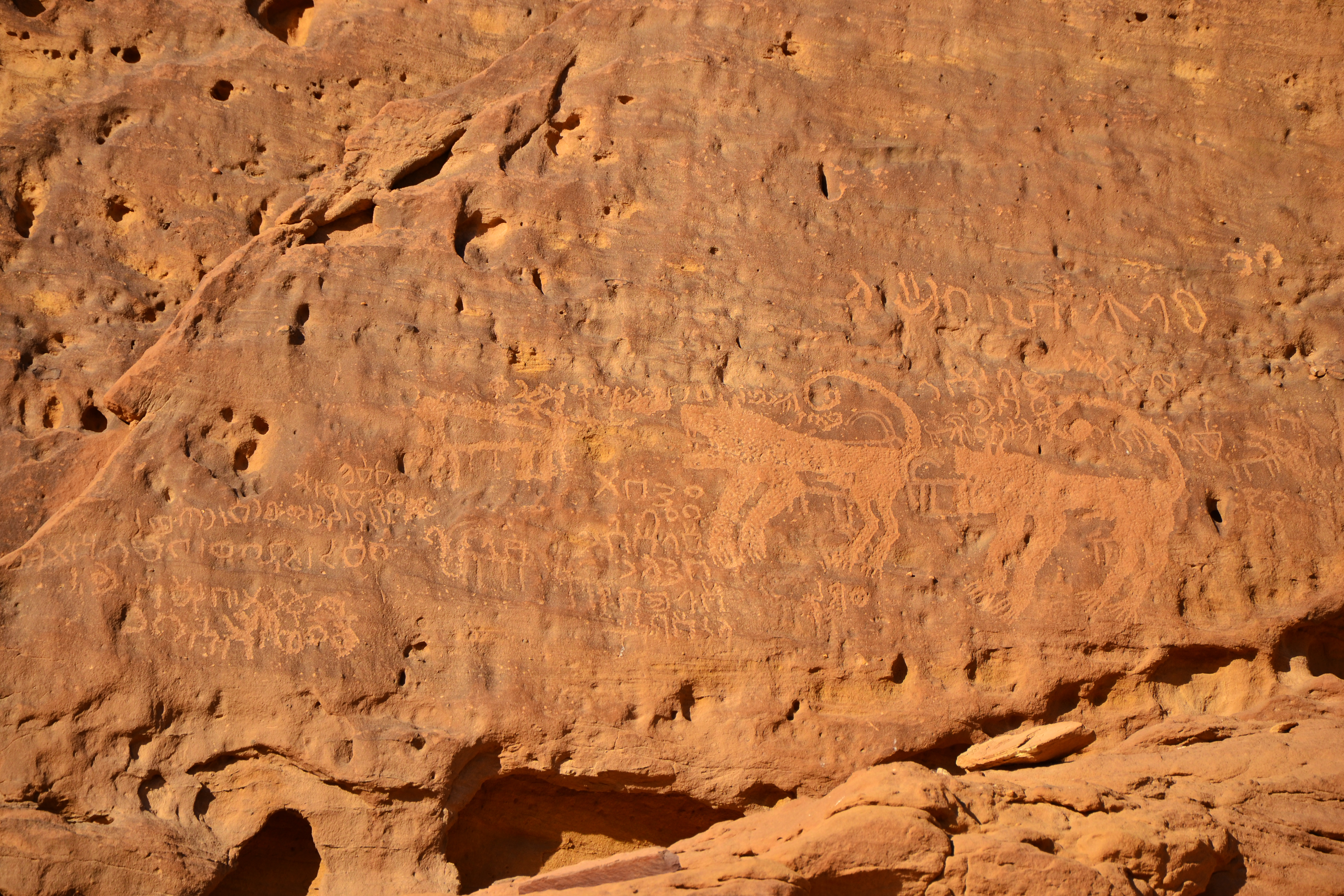
Petroglyphs at Mada'in Salih.

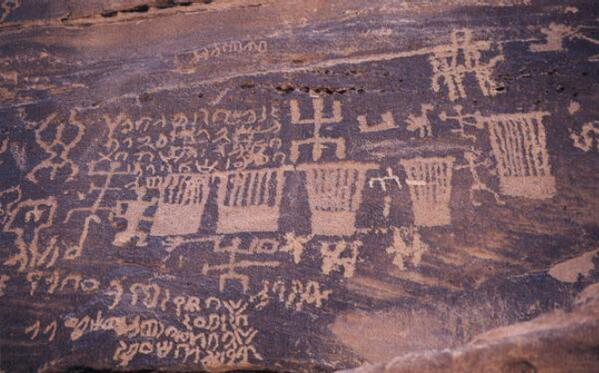
Petroglyphs of musical instruments.

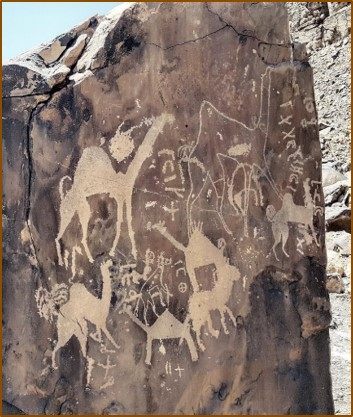
Petroglyphs of animals, Tabuk.

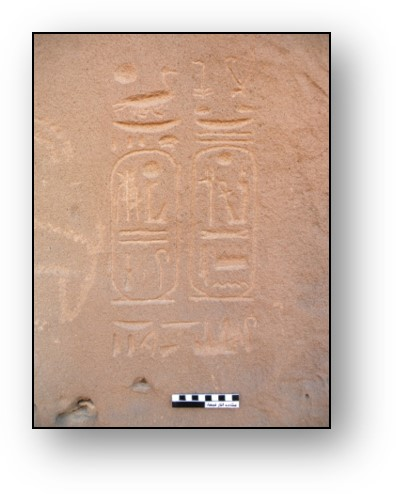
Hieroglyphic inscriptions, Tabuk.

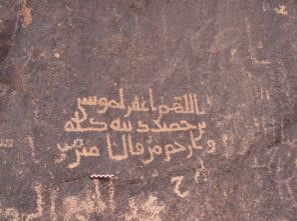
Islamic inscriptions, Qasim.

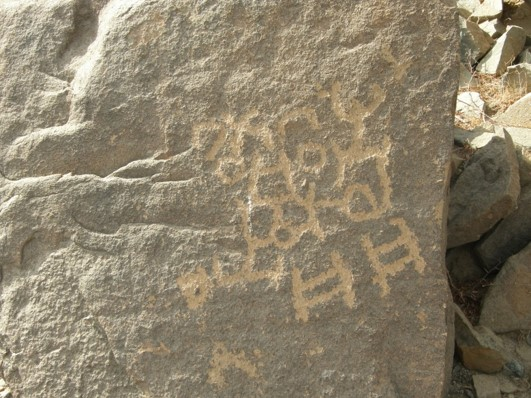
Thamudic inscriptions.
- "Graffiti Rocks", about 110 km SW of Riyadh off the Mecca highway
- Arwa, west of Riyadh
- al Jawf, near al Jawf
- al Jawf, Camel Carving Site
- Jubbah, Umm Samnan, north of Hail
- Janin Cave, south of Hail
- Yatib, south of Hail
- Milihiya, south of Hail
- Jebel al Lawz, north of Tabuk
- Wadi Damm, near Tabuk
- Wadi Abu Oud, near al Ula
- Shuwaymis, north of Madina
- Jebel al Manjour & Ratt, north of Madina
- Hanakiya, north of Madina
- Shimli
- Bir Hima, north of Najran
- Tathleeth, north of Najran
- Al-Magar, in Najd

=== Taiwan ===
- The Wanshan Rock Carvings Archeological Site near Maolin District, Kaohsiung, were discovered between 1978 and 2002.

=== Thailand ===
- Pha Taem National Park

=== Vietnam ===
- Rock engravings in Sapa, Sa Pa, Lào Cai Province
- Rock engravings in Namdan, Xín Mần District, Hà Giang Province

=== Yemen ===
- Eriosh Petroglyphs, island of Socotra

== Europe ==
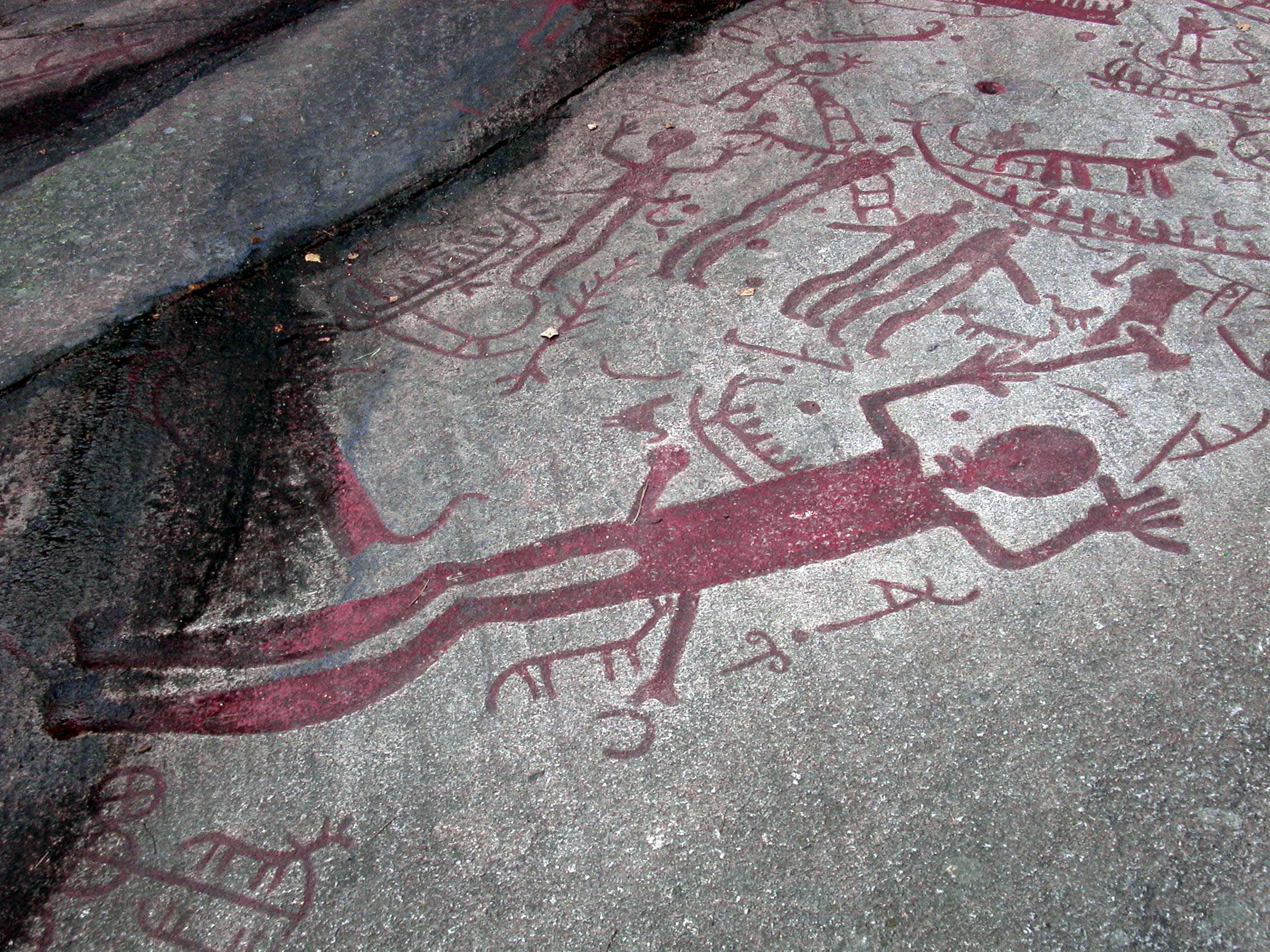
Carving "The Shoemaker", Brastad, Sweden

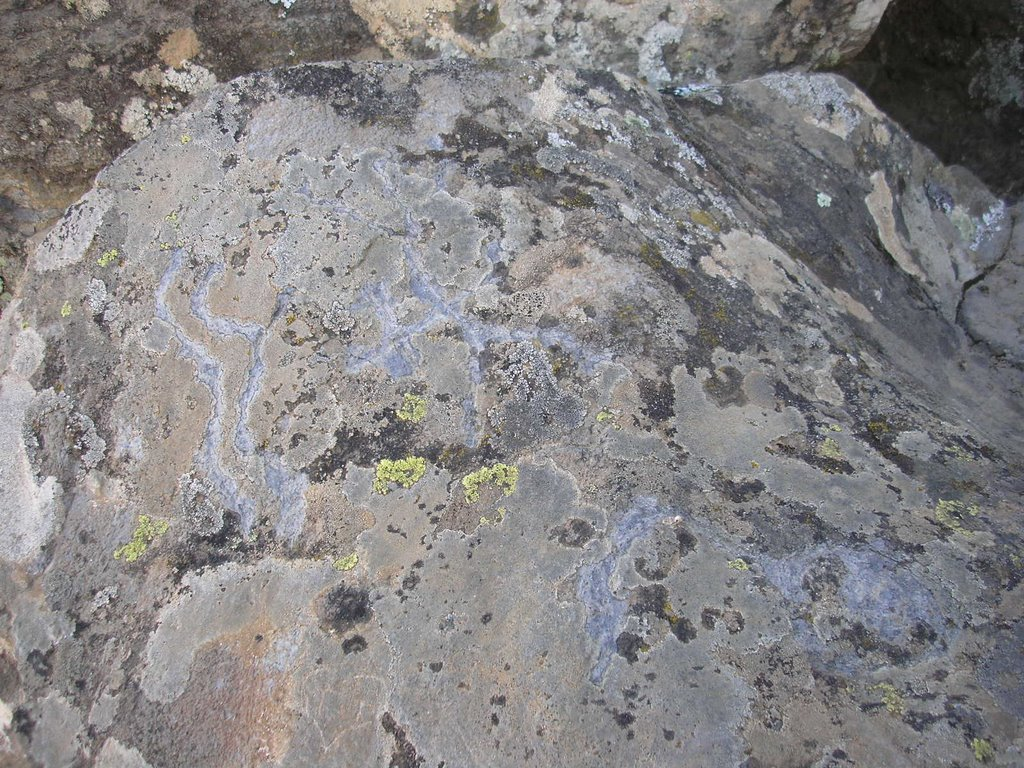
Petroglyph in Roque Bentayga, Gran Canaria (Canary Islands).

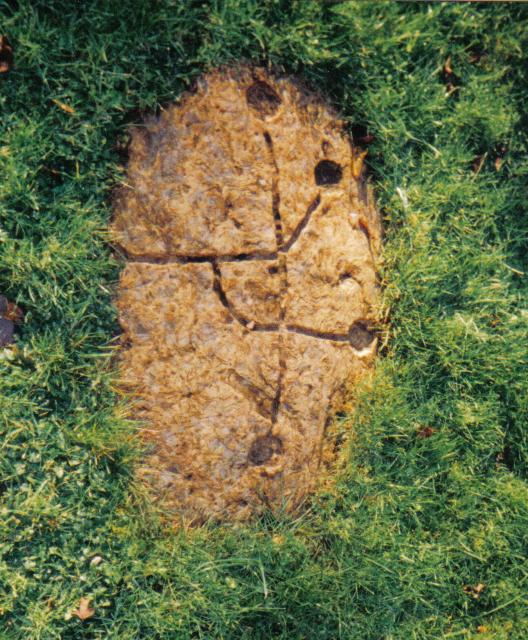
Petroglyph at Dalgarven Mill, Ayrshire, Scotland.

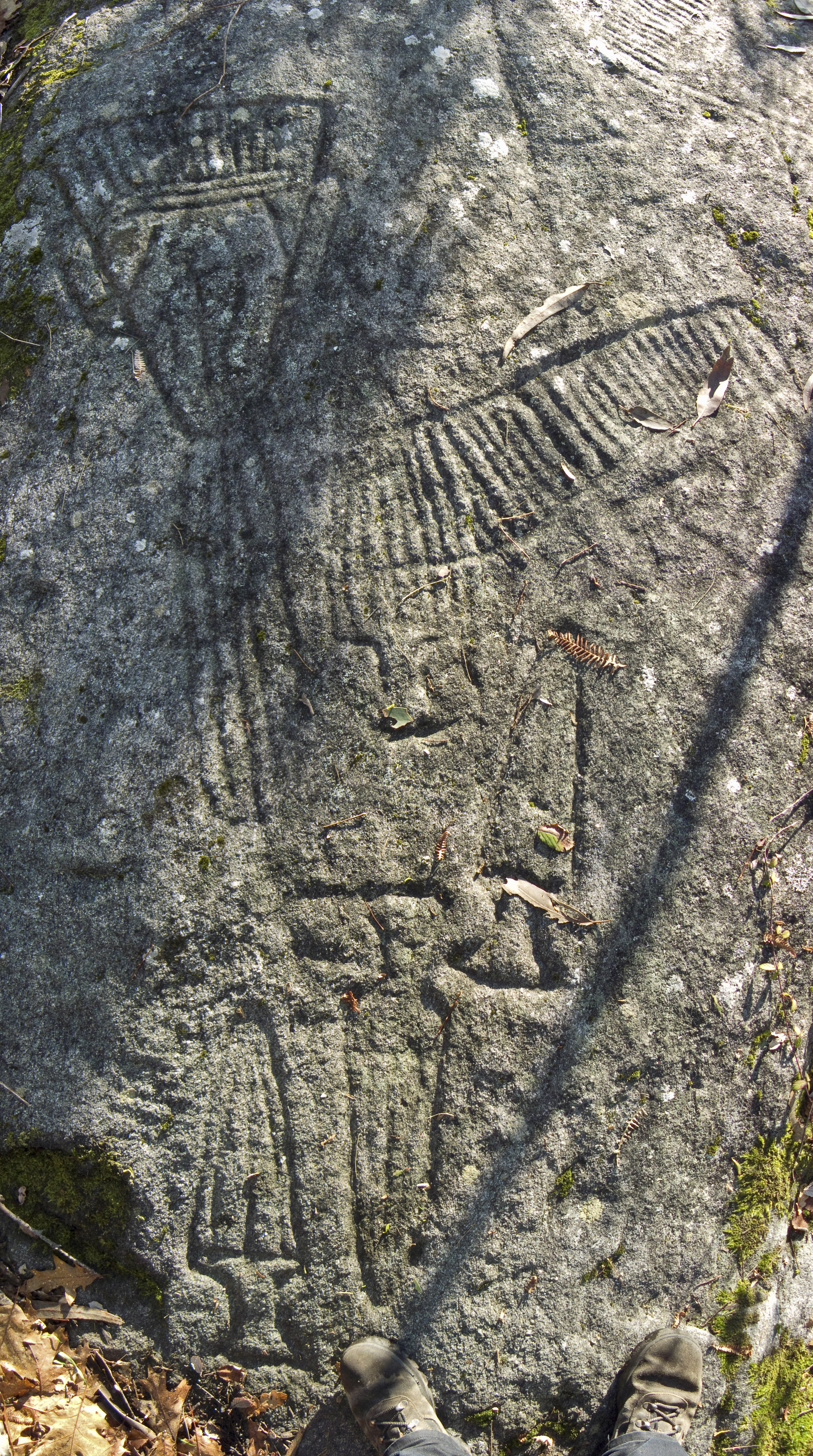
Bronze Age petroglyphs depicting weapons, Castriño de Conxo, Santiago de Compostela, Galicia.

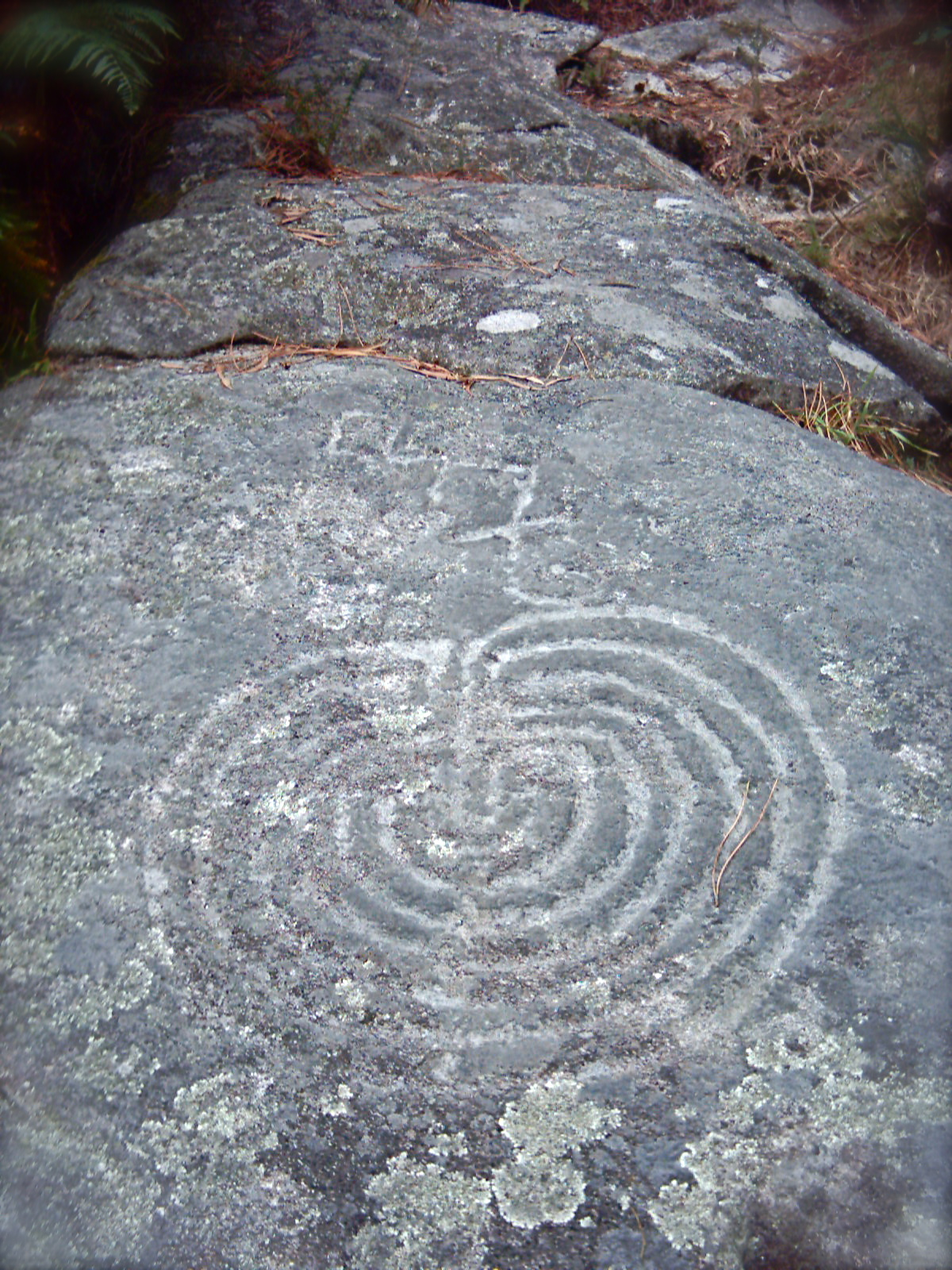
Labyrinth, Meis, Galicia.

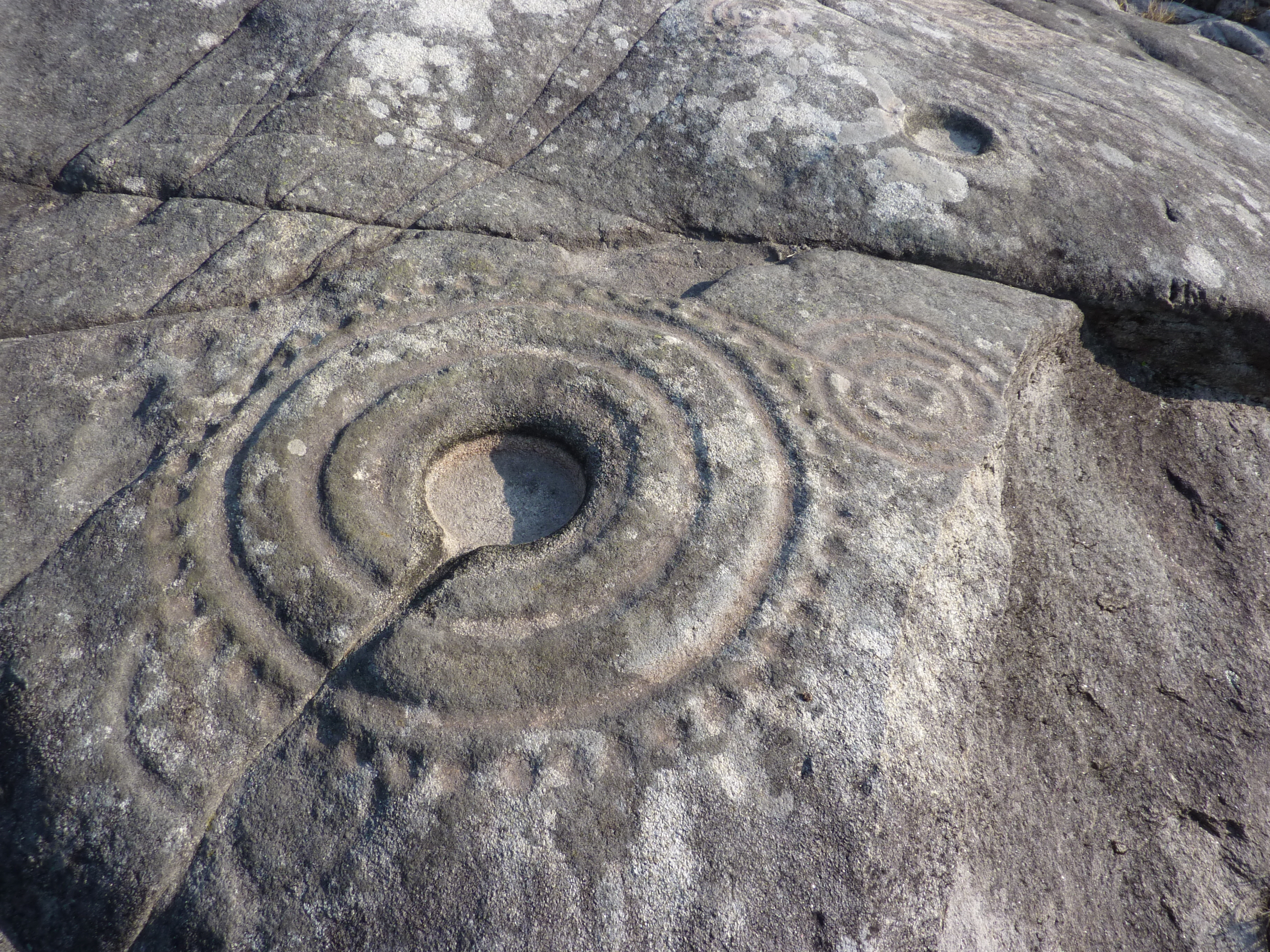
Cup-and-ring mark, Louro, Muros, Galicia.

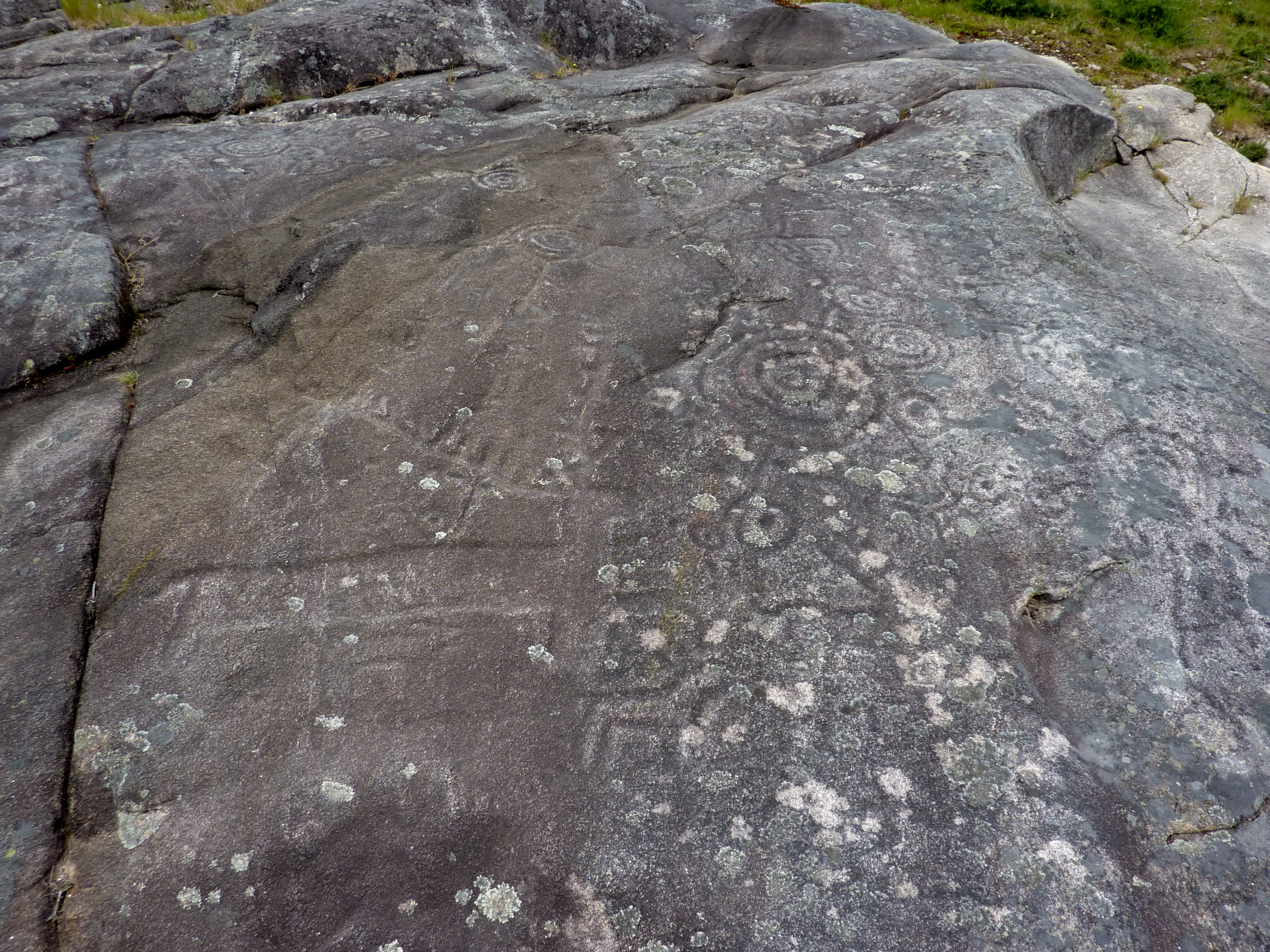
Deer and cup-and-ring motifs, Tourón, Ponte Caldelas, Galicia.

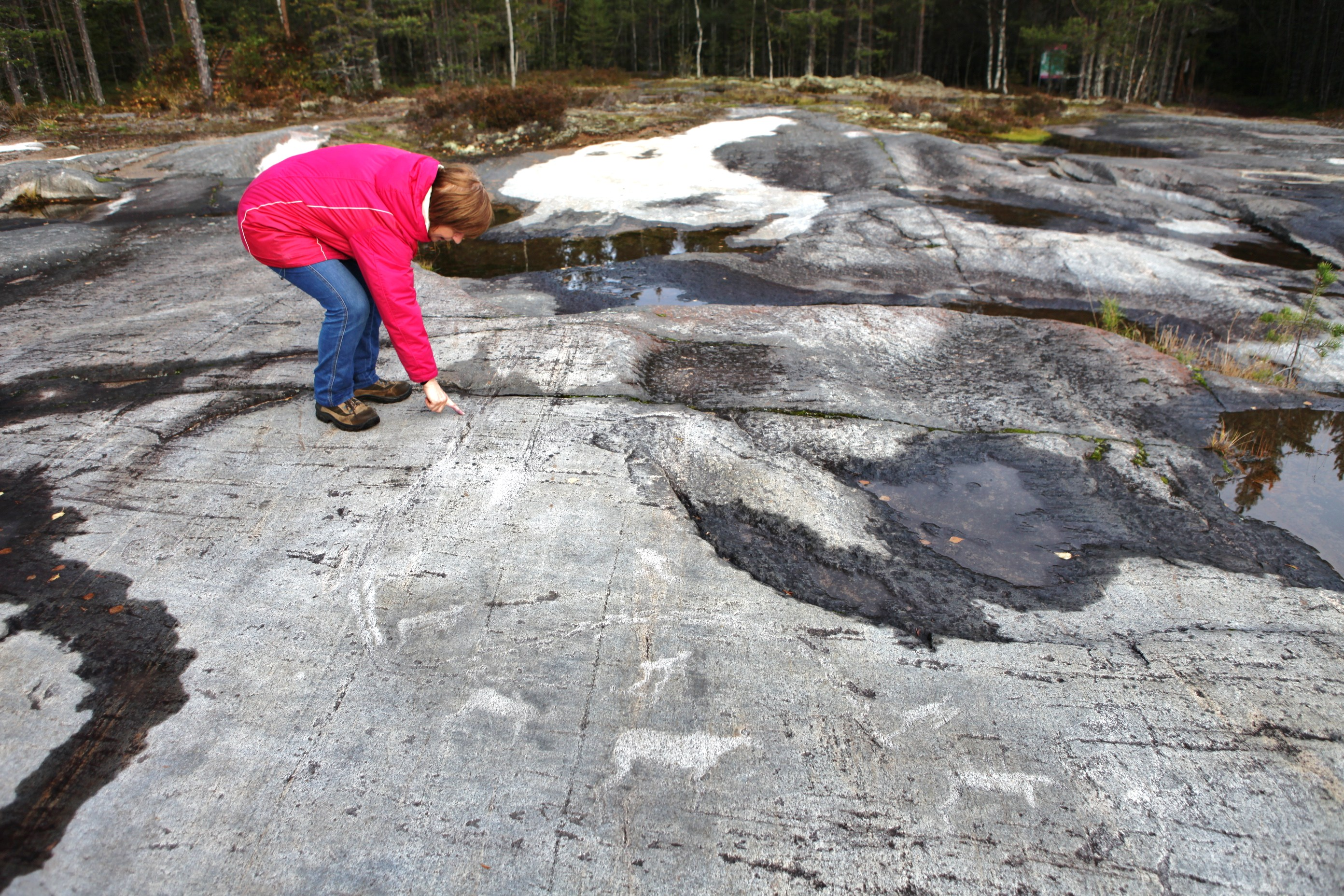
Petroglyphs in Zalavruga, Belomorsk, Karelia, Russia

=== England ===
- Boscawen-un, St Buryan
- Cup and ring marked rocks in:
  - Northumberland,
  - County Durham,
  - Ilkley Moor, Yorkshire,
  - Gardom's Edge, Derbyshire,
  - Creswell Crags, Nottingham

=== Finland ===
- Hauensuoli, Hanko, Finland

=== France ===
- Prehistoric rock engravings of the Fontainebleau Forest
- Vallée des Merveilles, Mercantour National Park, France
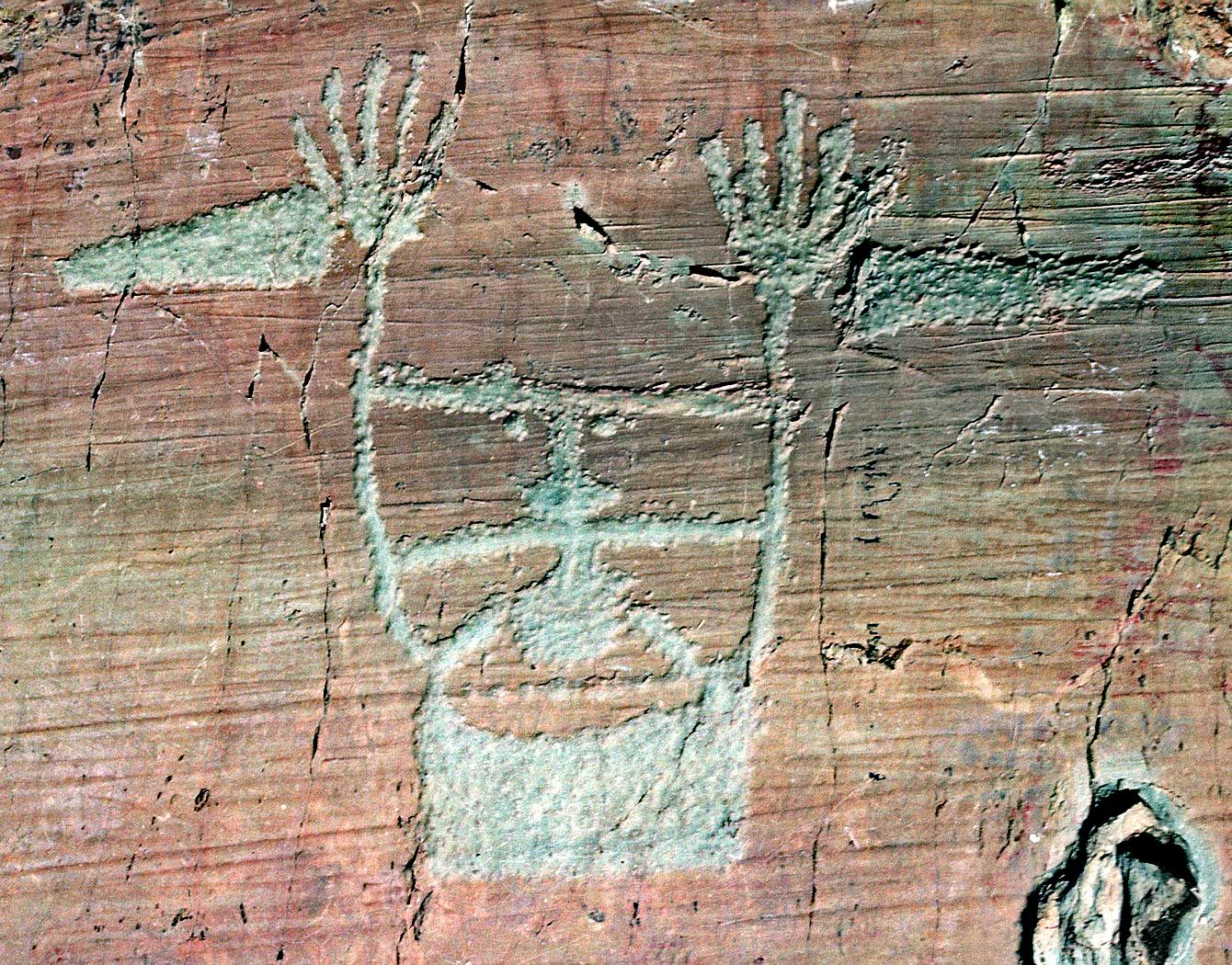
The sorcerer, Vallée des Merveilles, France

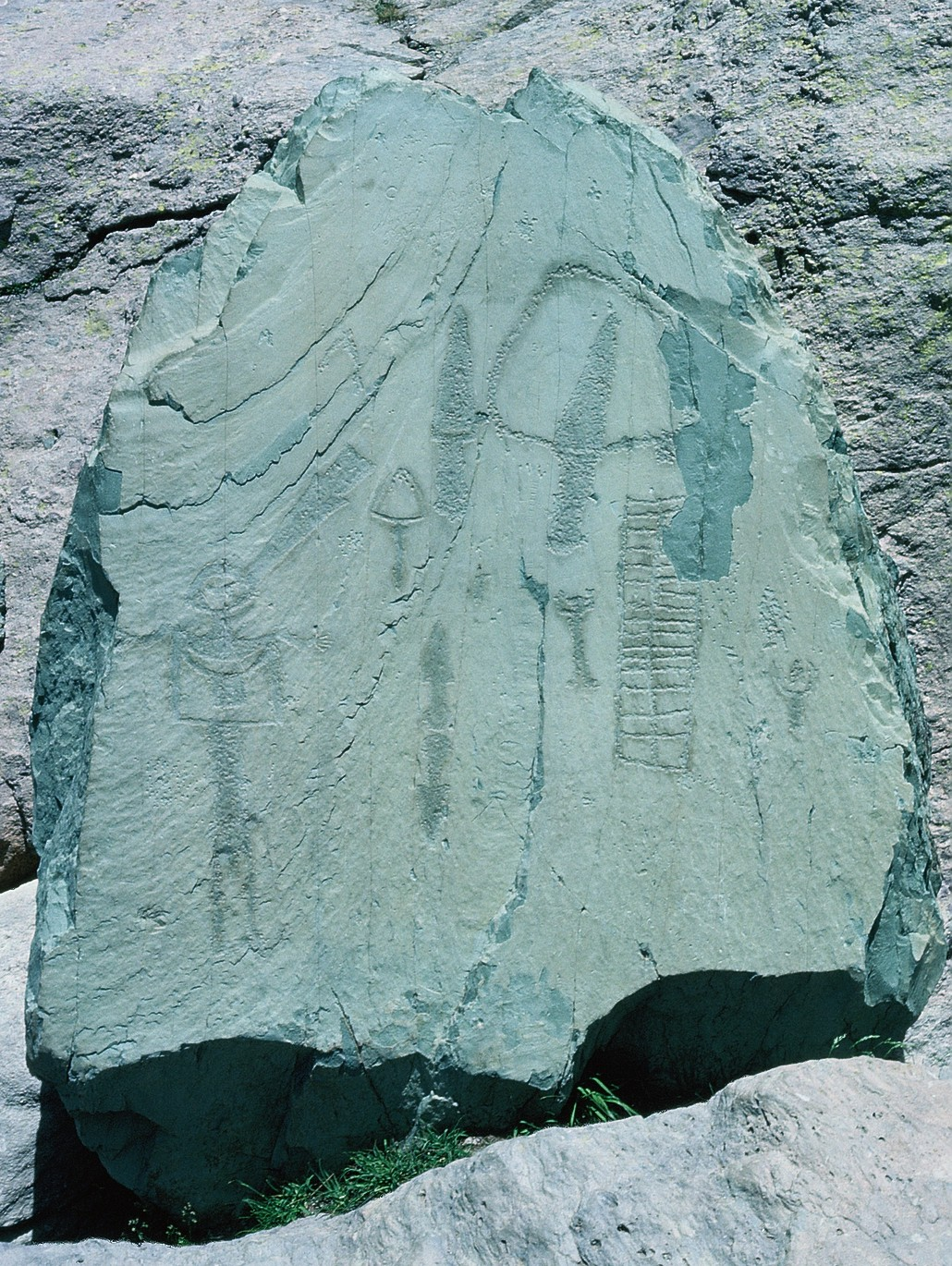
The tribe master, Vallée des Merveilles, France

=== Ireland ===
- Newgrange
- Knowth
- Dowth
- Loughcrew
- Tara
- Clonfinlough Stone
- Boheh Stone

=== Italy ===
- Rock Drawings in Valcamonica – World Heritage Site, Italy (biggest European site, over 350,000)
- Bagnolo stele, Valcamonica, Italy
- Grotta del Genovese, Sicily, Italy
- Grotta dell'Addaura, Sicily, Italy
- Rock Engravings in Grosio (in Valtellina), Italy
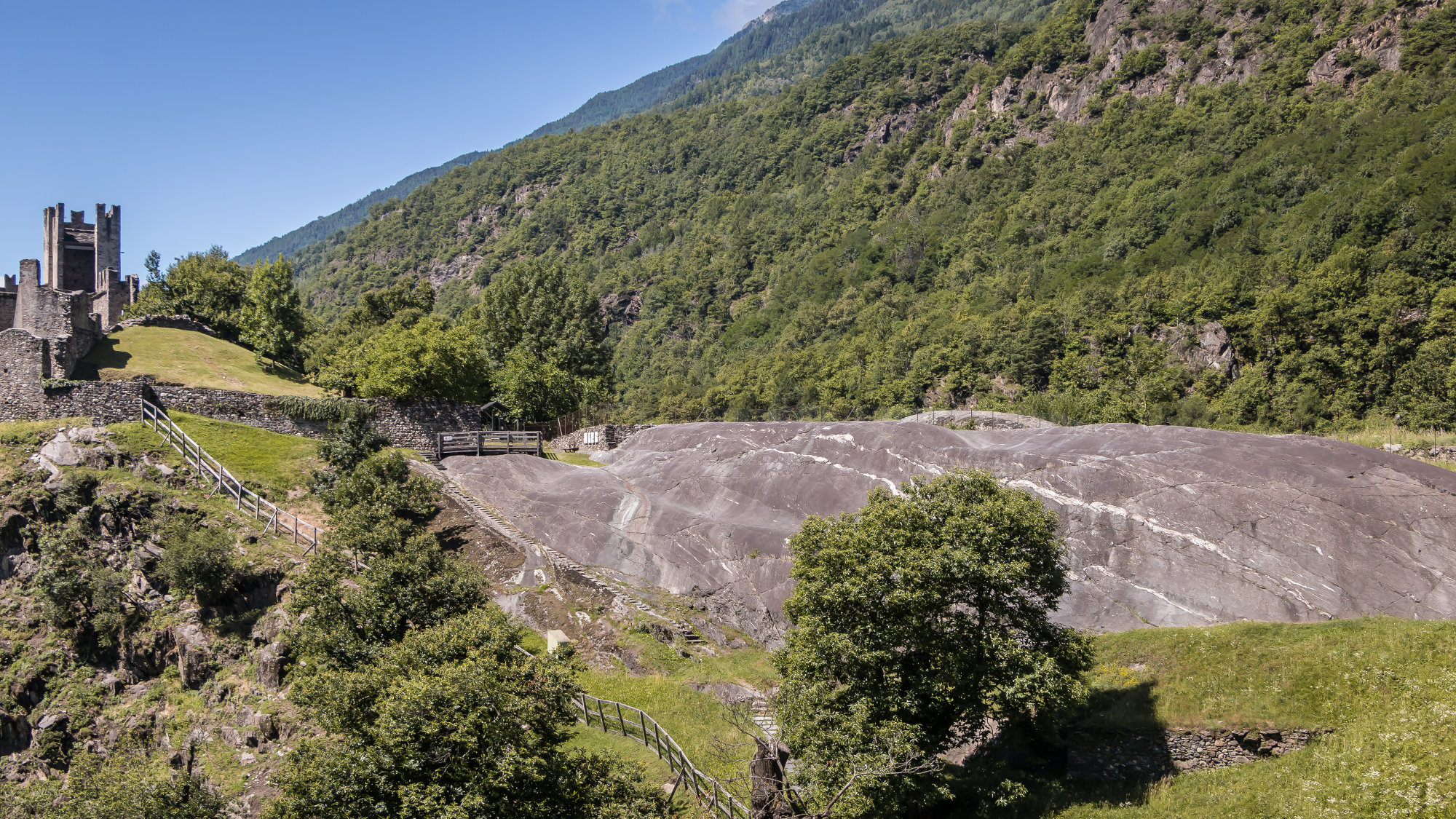
Grosio - Rupe Magna

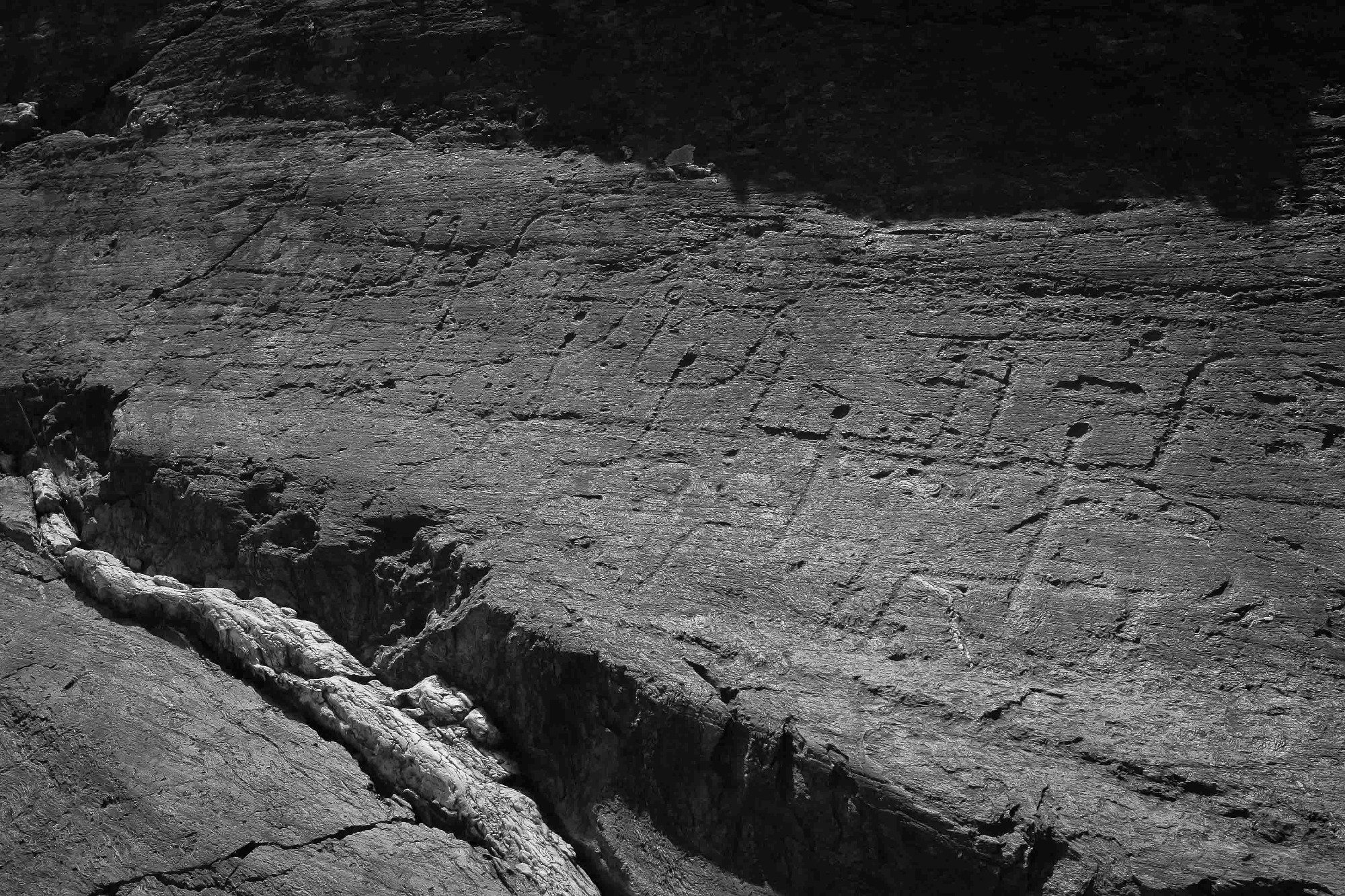
Grosio - Rupe Magna

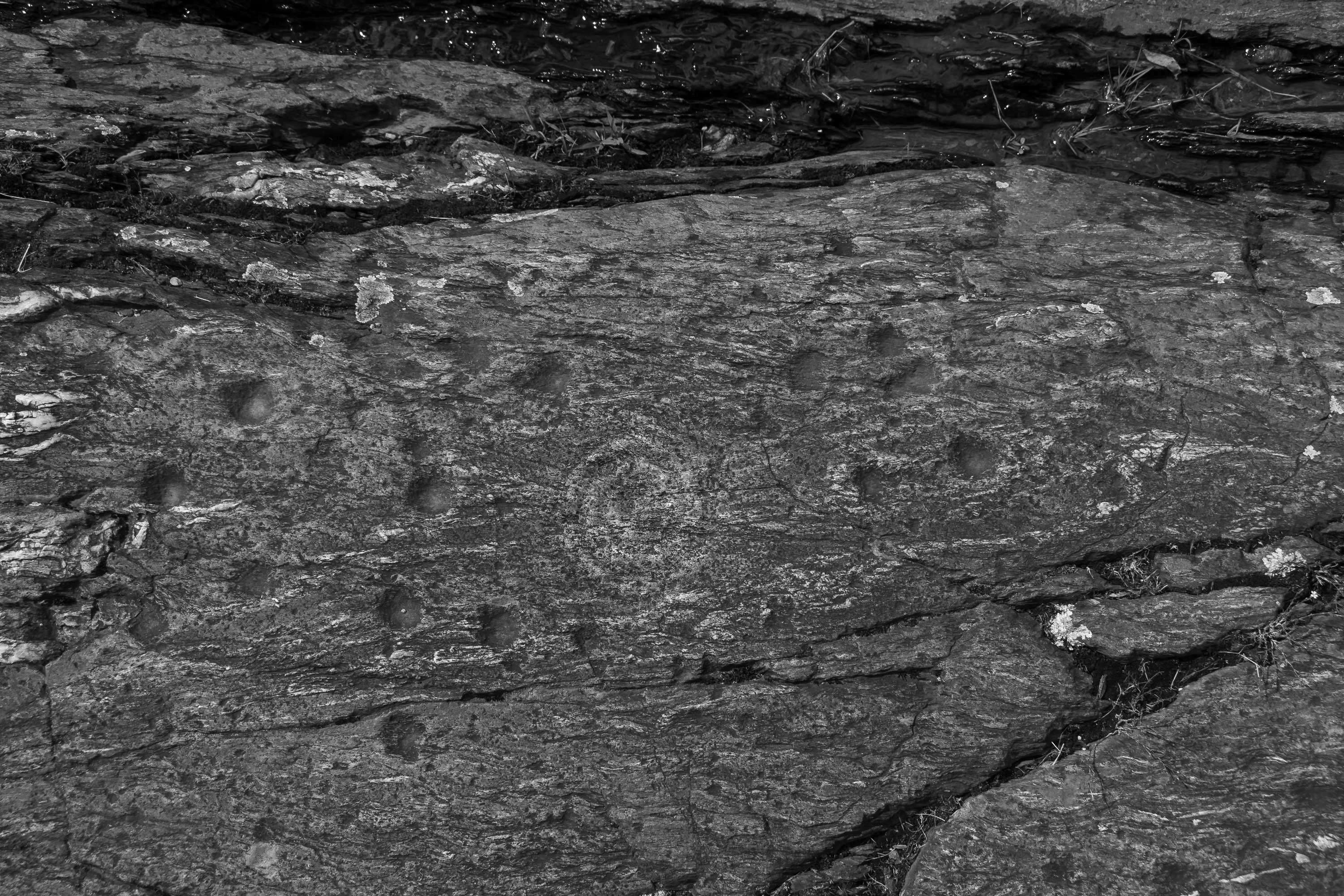
Grosio - Rupe Magna

=== Northern Ireland ===
- Knockmany
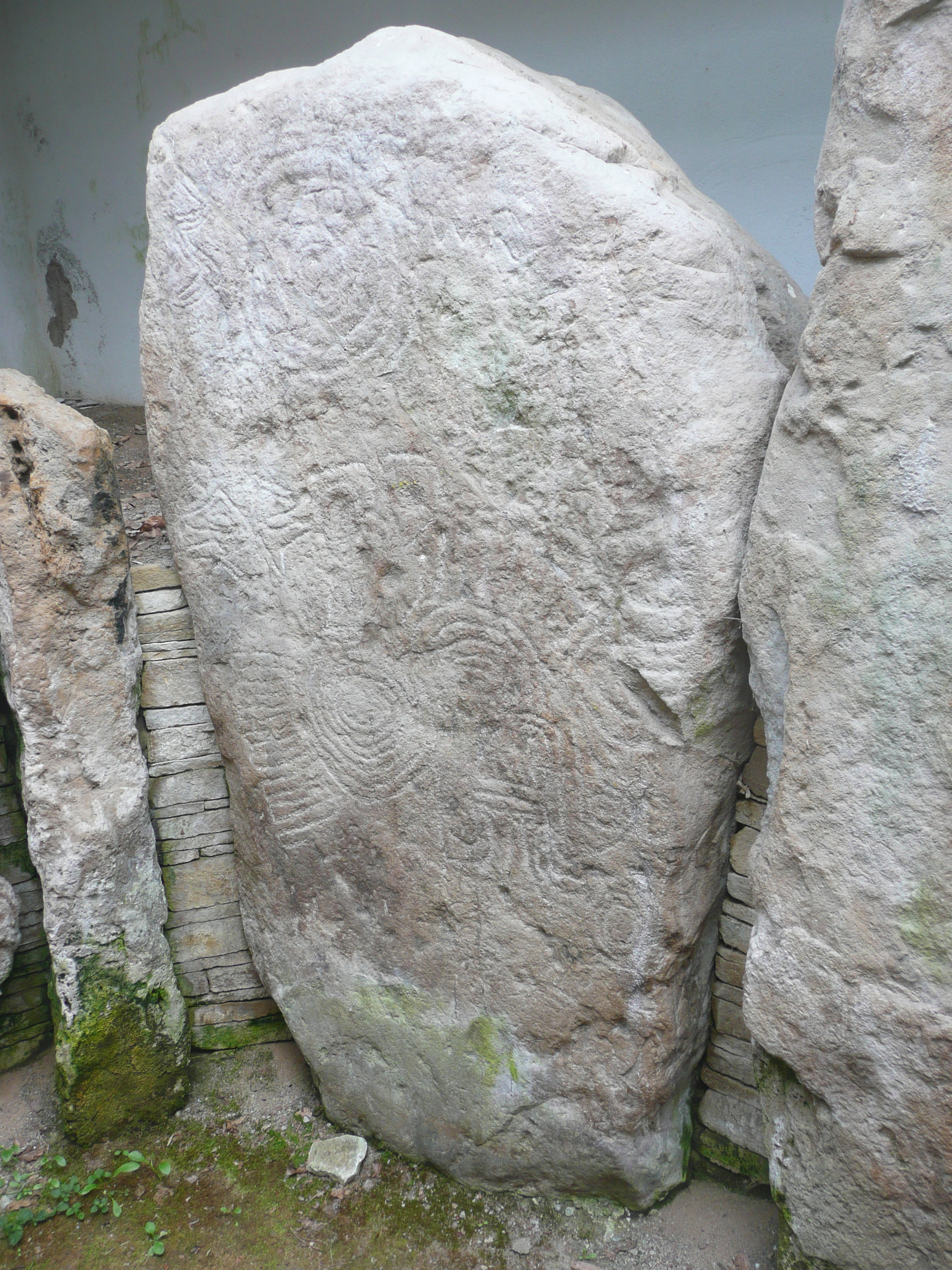
Leftmost of three central stones, Knockmany Chambered Tomb, Co. Tyrone

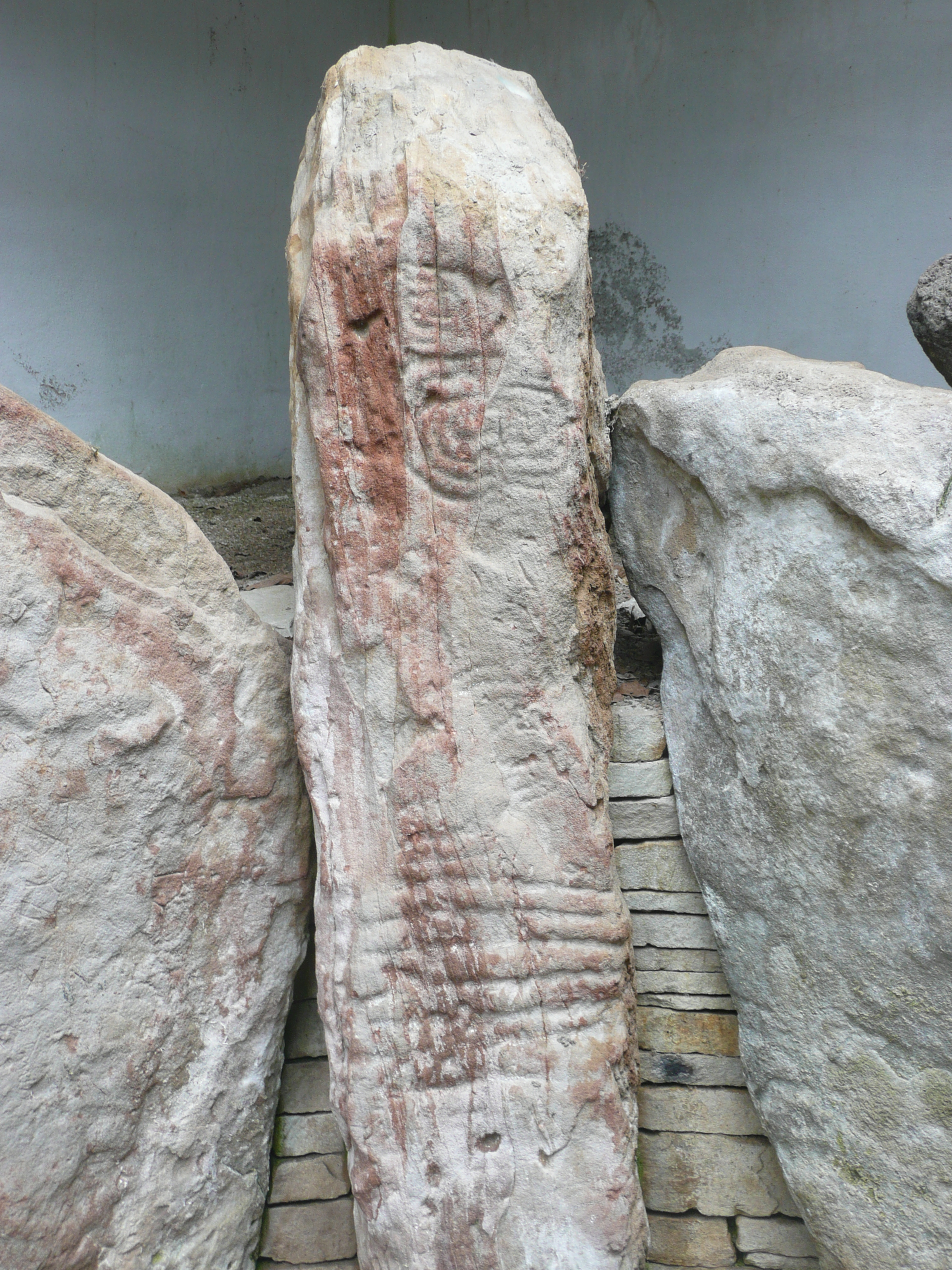
Central of three central stones, Knockmany Chambered Tomb, Co. Tyrone

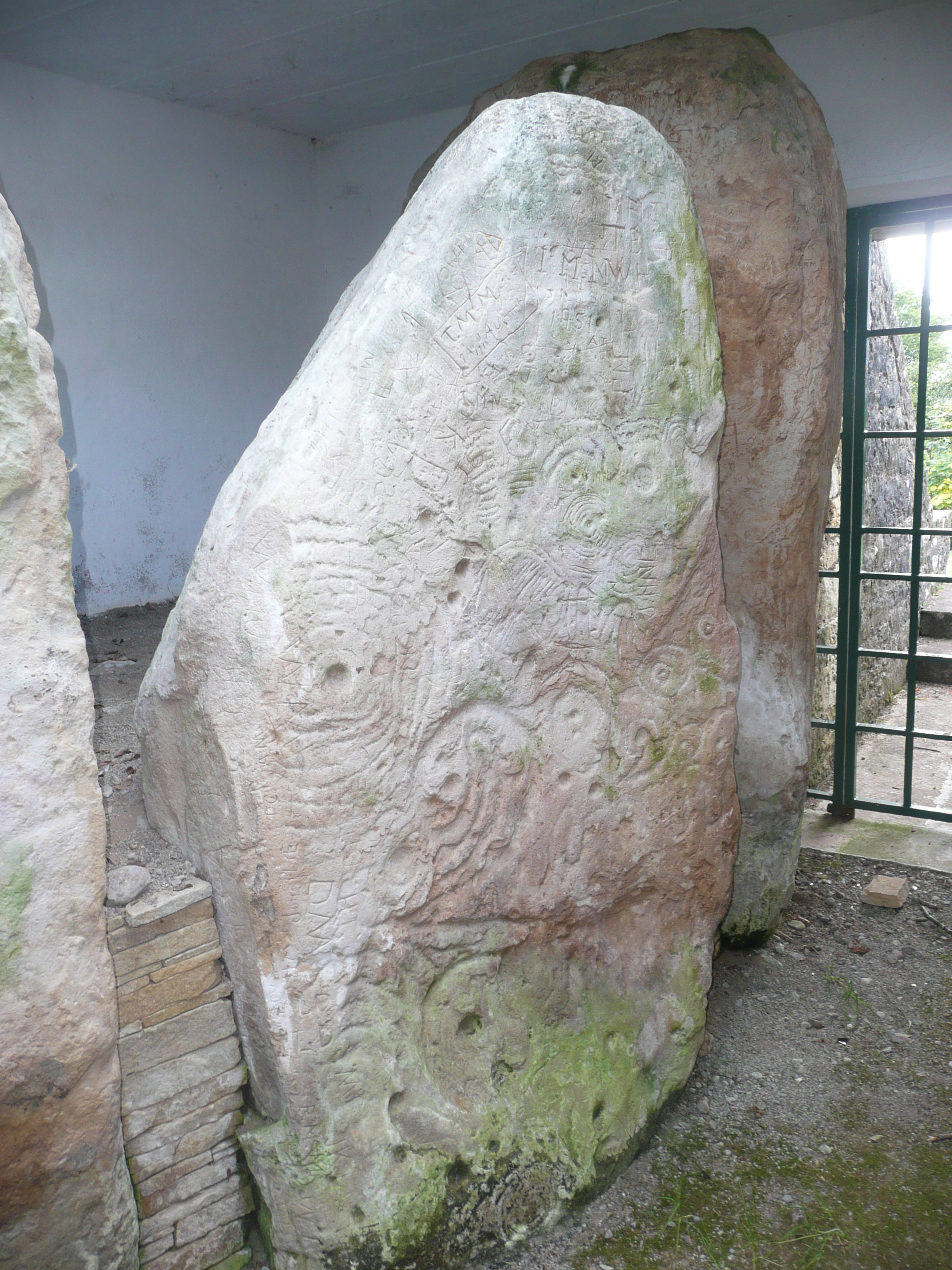
A stone on the right of the passage, Knockmany Chambered Tomb, Co. Tyrone
- Sess Kilgreen
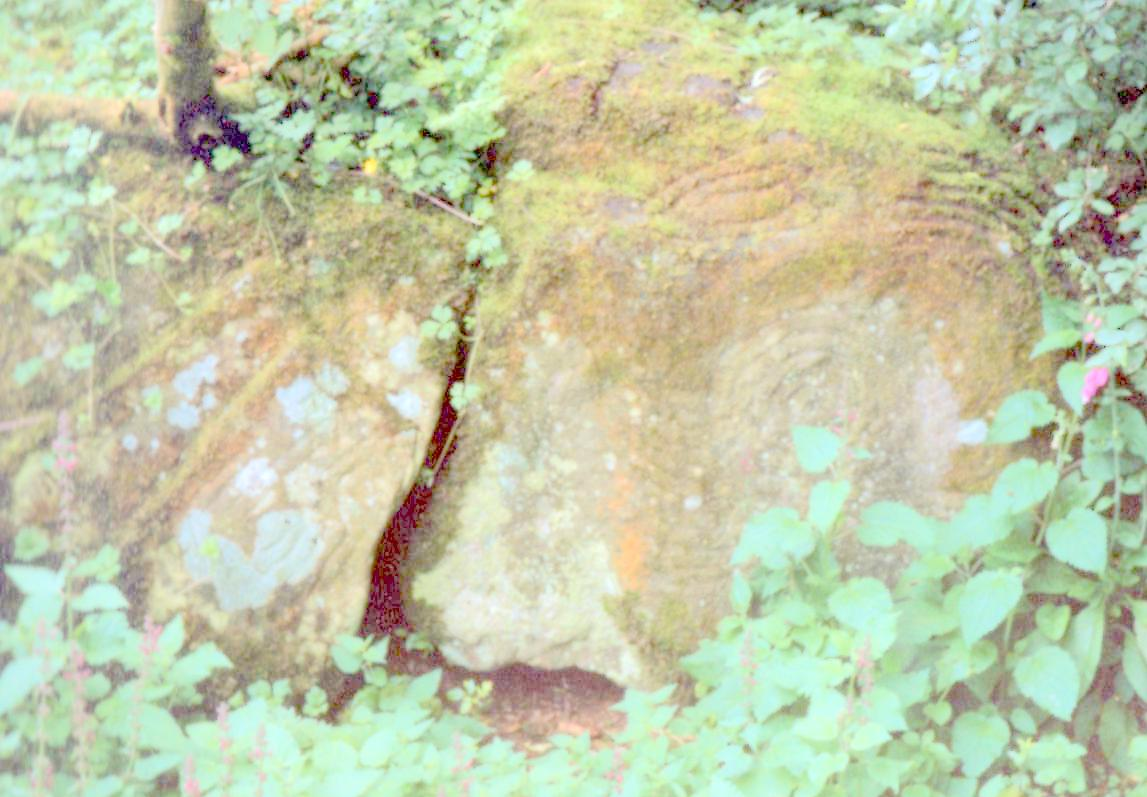
Sess Kilgreen Chambered Tomb, Co. Tyrone

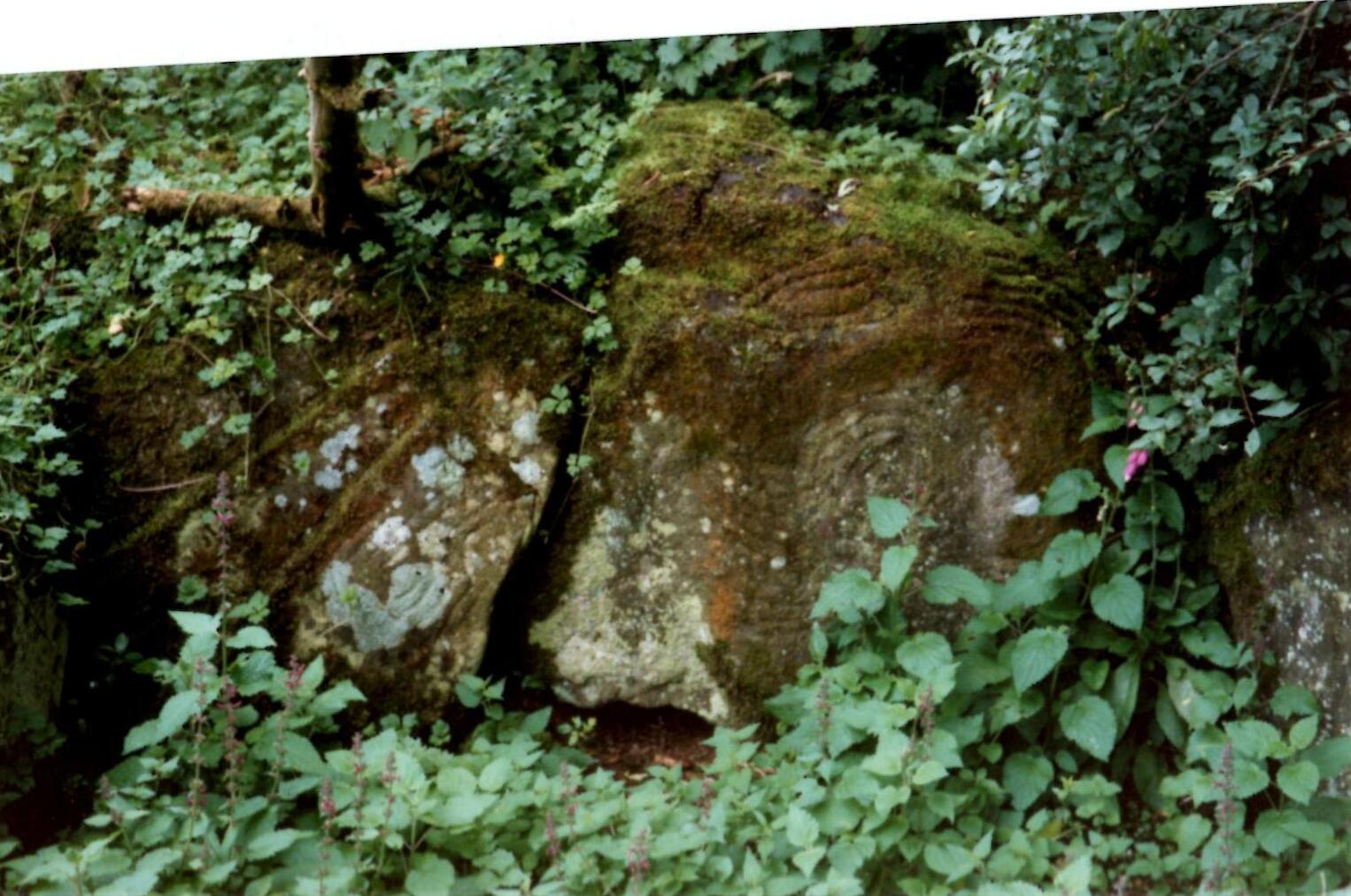
Sess Kilgreen Chambered Tomb, Co. Tyrone

=== Norway ===
- Rock carvings at Alta, World Heritage Site (1985)
- Rock carvings in Central Norway
- Rock carvings at Møllerstufossen
- Rock carvings at Tennes

=== Portugal ===
- Prehistoric Rock Art Sites in the Côa Valley, Portugal
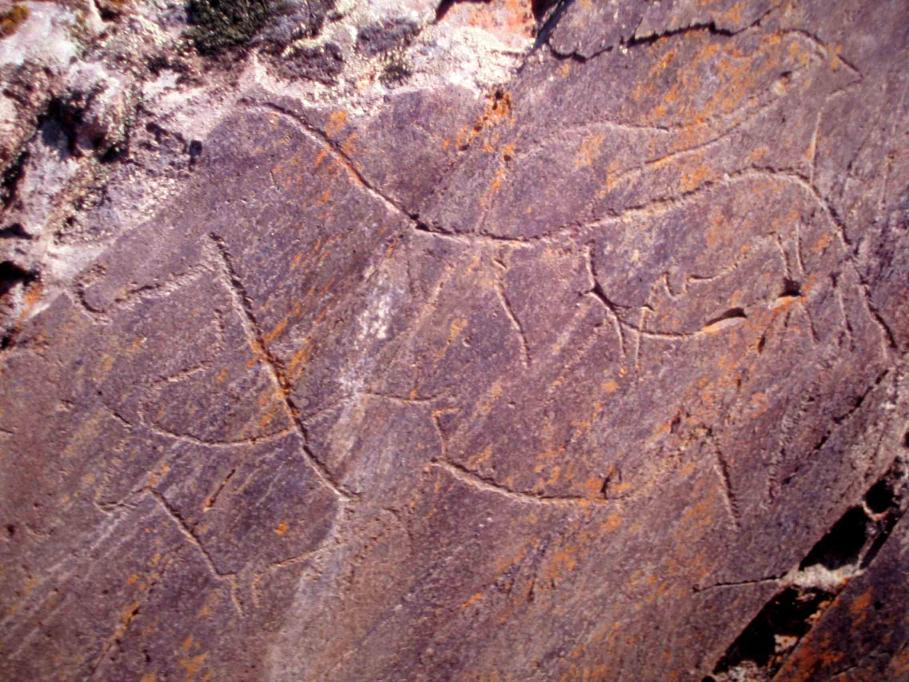
Various zoomorphic creatures, including in particular, a horse

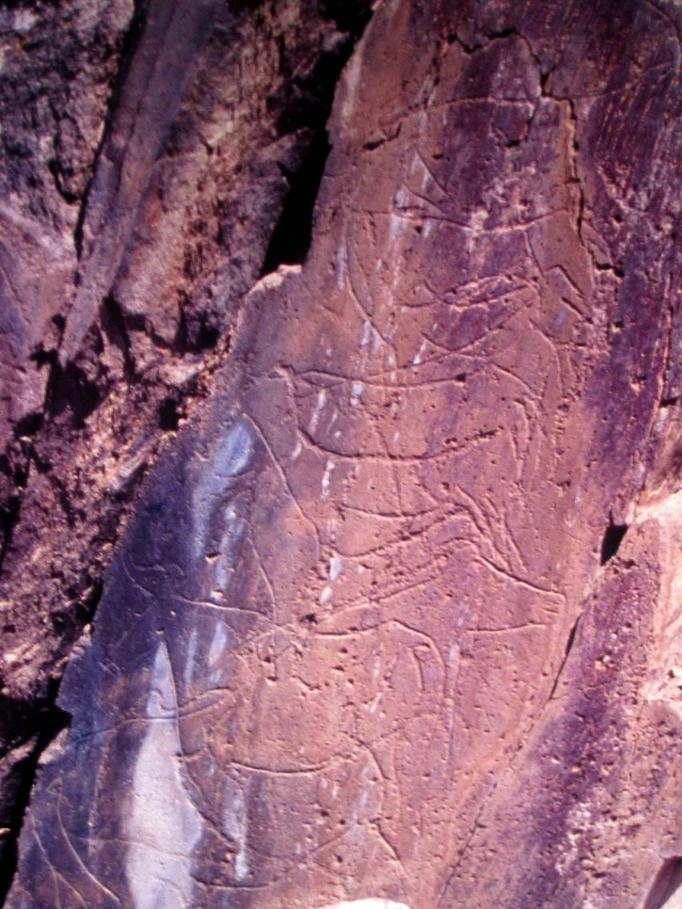
Paleolithic rock engravings breaking the natural rock formation

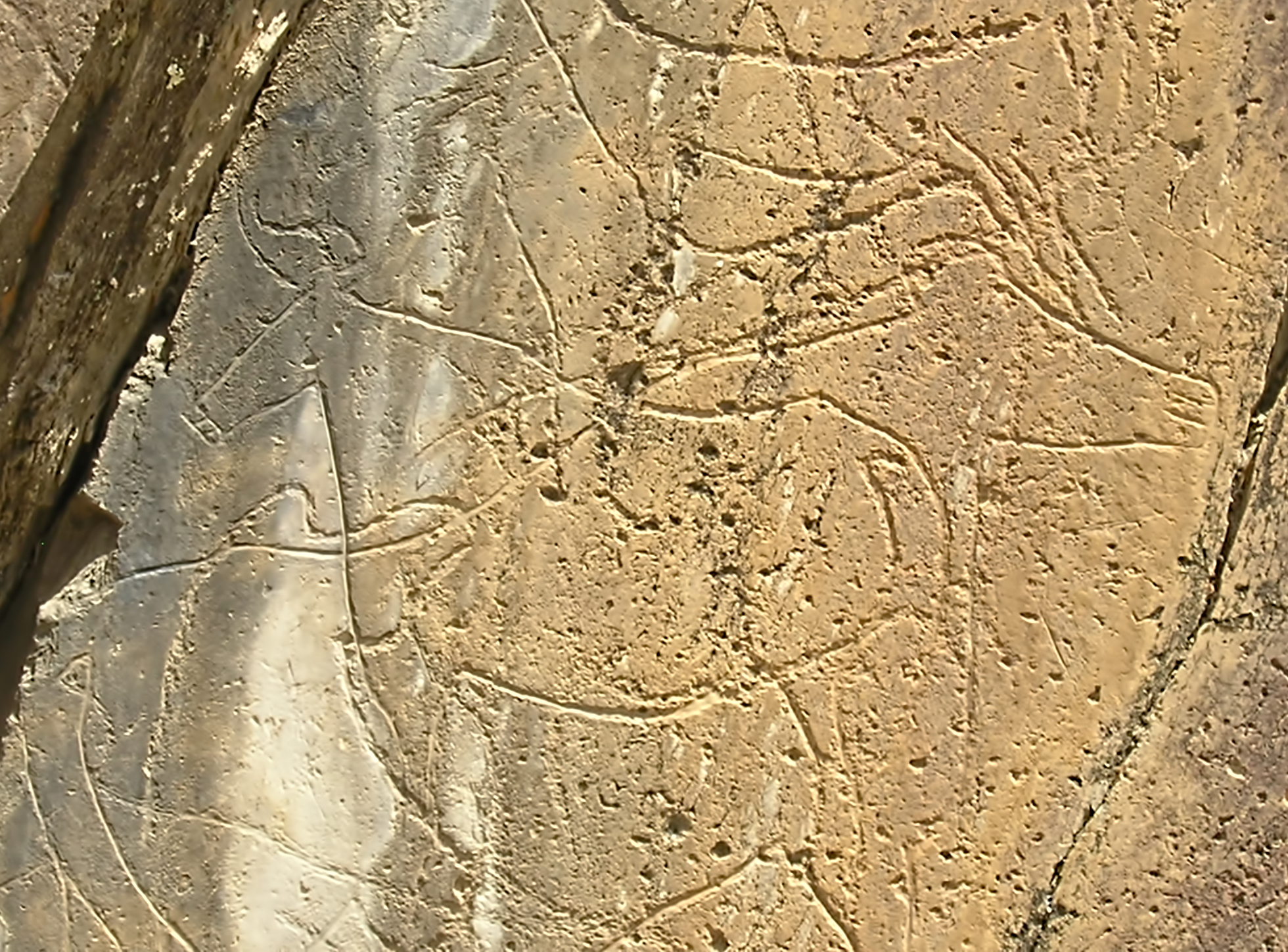
Various zoomorphic creatures, including in particular, a Bull

=== Scotland ===
- Museum of Ayrshire Country Life and Costume, North Ayrshire
- Burghead Bull, Burghead
- Townhead, Galloway
- Ballochmyle cup and ring marks

=== Spain ===
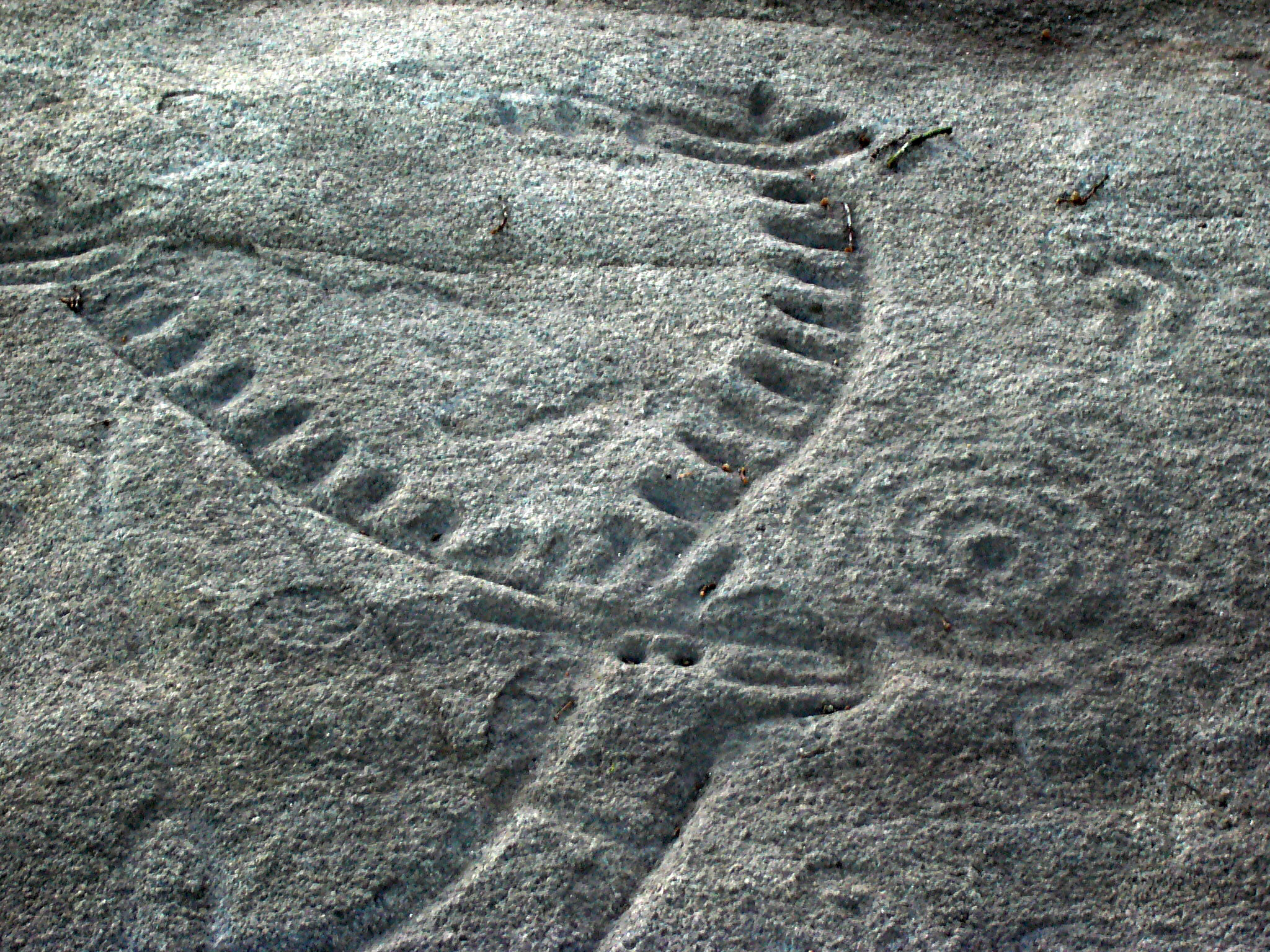
Millenarian rock carvings, Laxe dos carballos at Campo Lameiro, Spain, showing a deer hit by several spears

- Petroglyphs in Louro, Monte Tetón, and Carnota, in Galicia

=== Russia ===
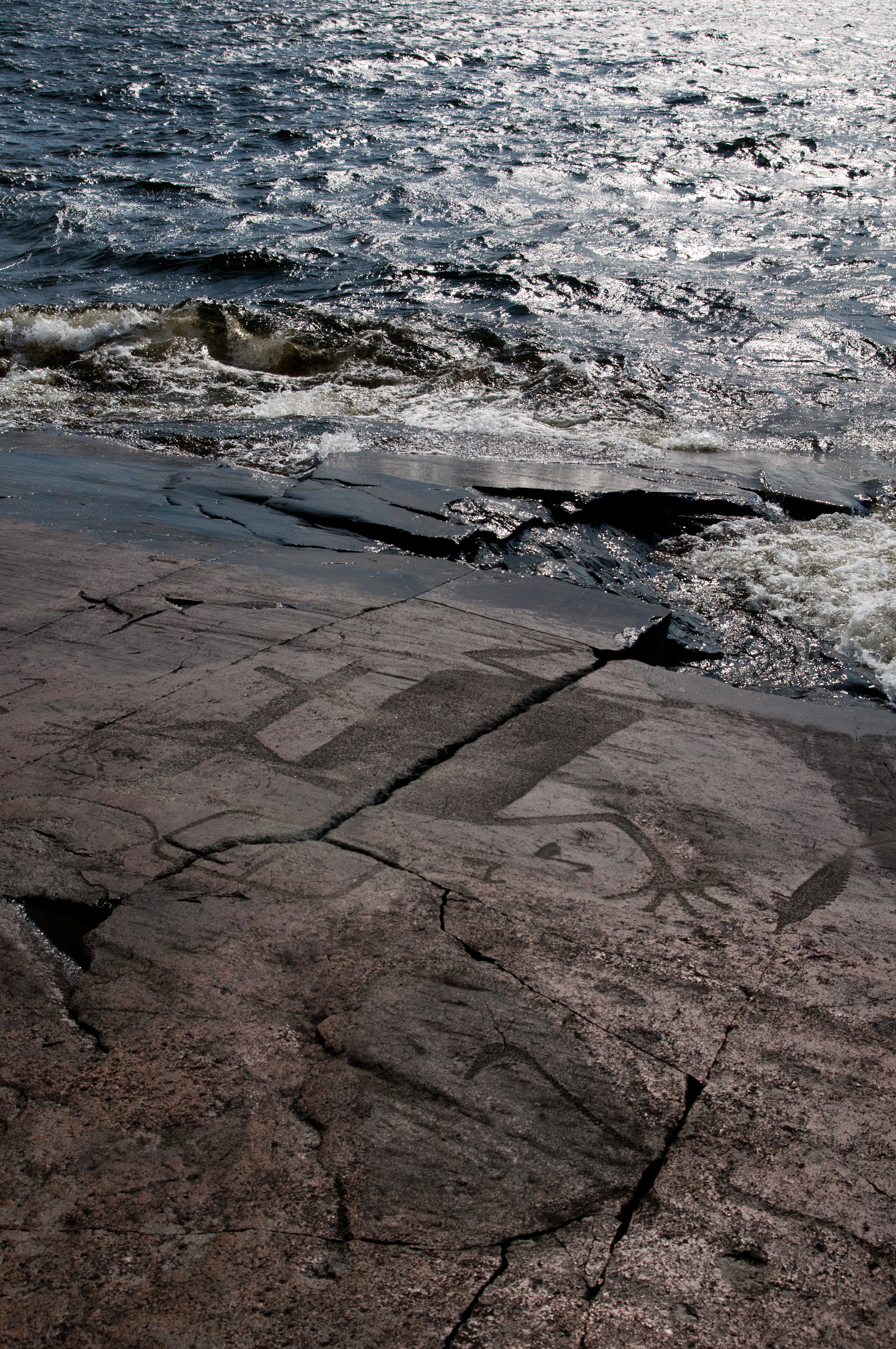
Petroglyph Park near Petrozavodsk–Lake Onega, Russia

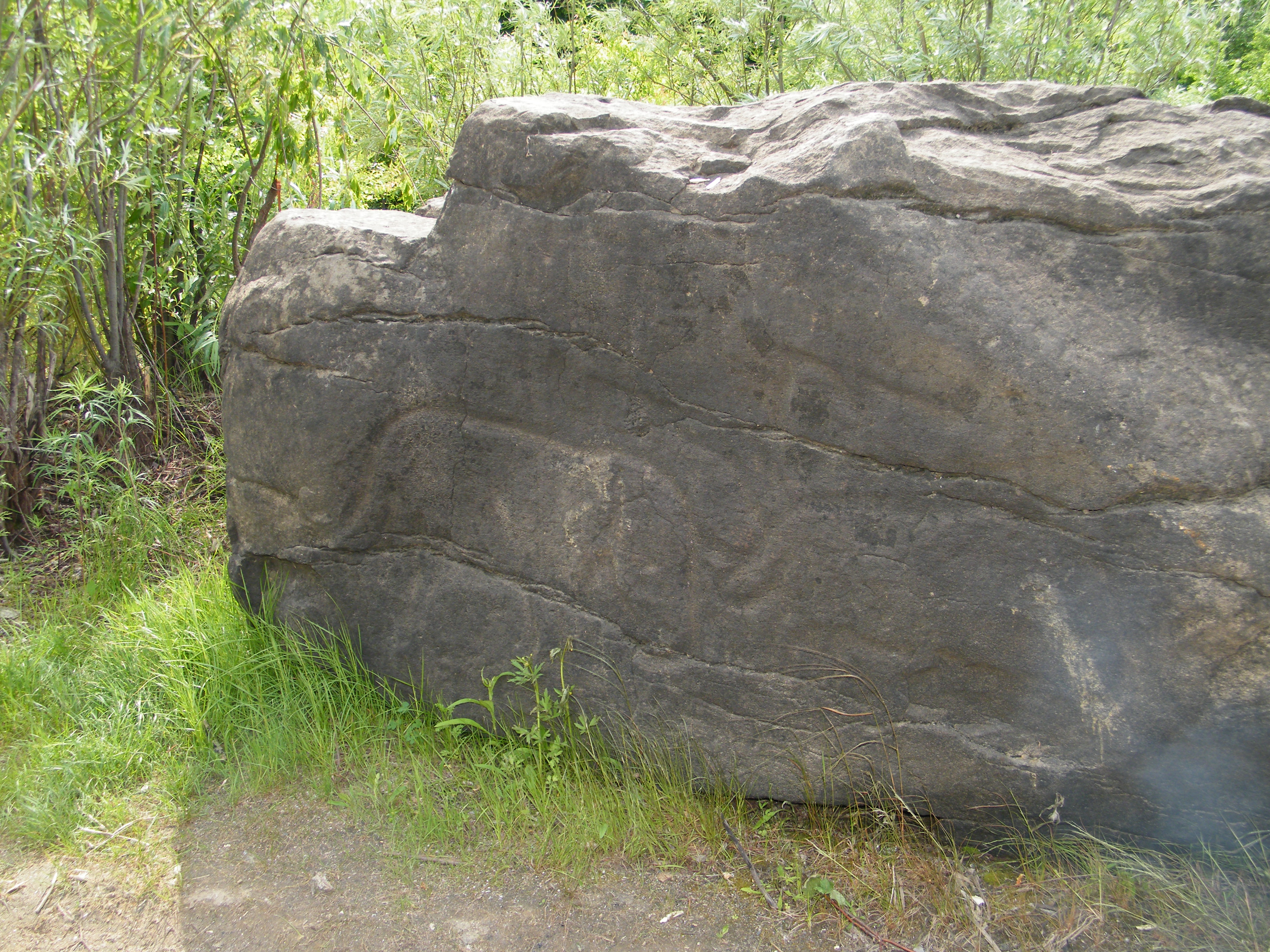
Mammoth on the basalt stone in Sikachi-Alyan, Russia

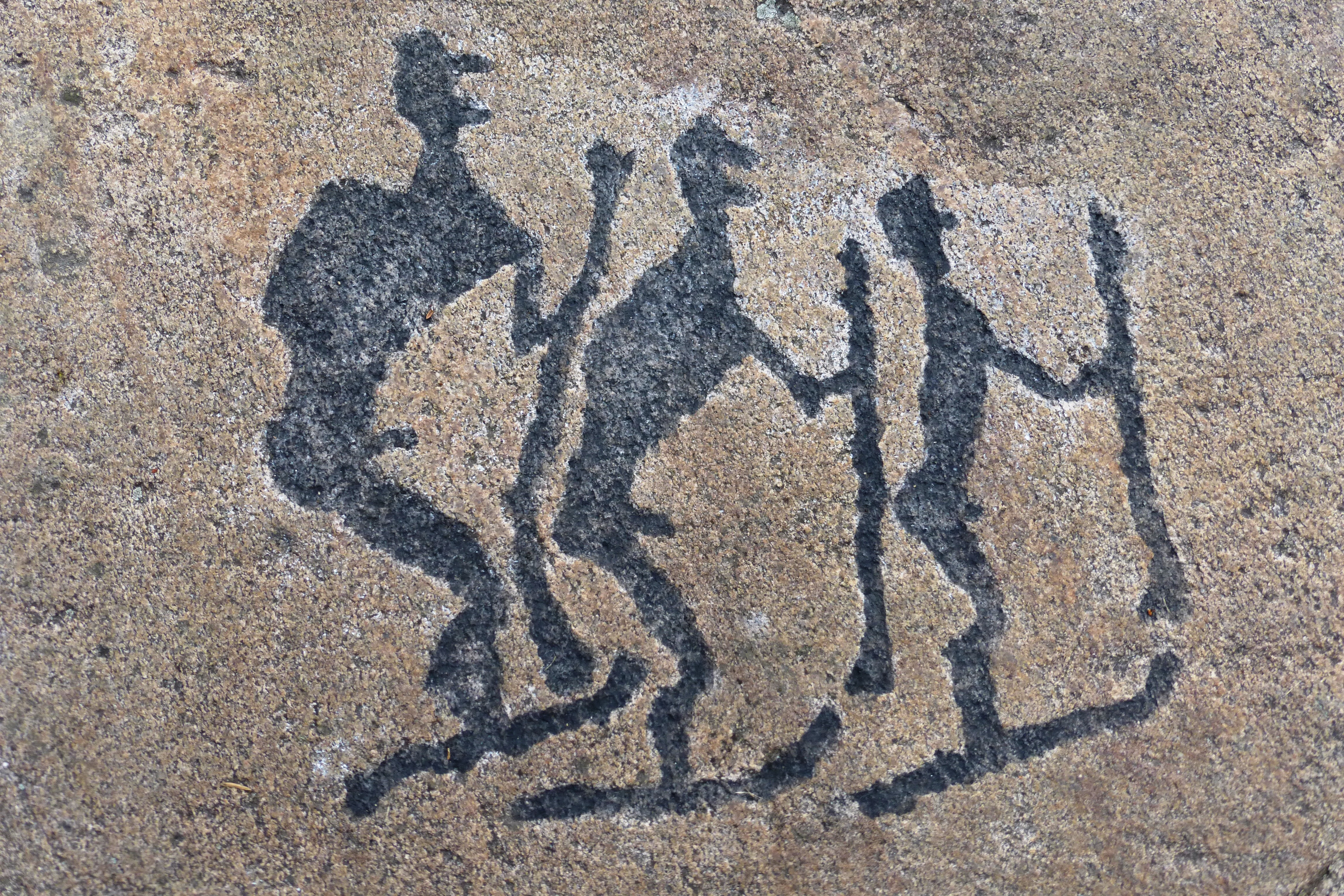
White Sea petroglyphs, Republic of Karelia, Russia

- White Sea petroglyphs, Republic of Karelia, Russia
- Petroglyph Park near Petrozavodsk–Lake Onega, Russia
- Tomskaya Pisanitsa
- Kanozero Petroglyphs
- Sikachi-Alyan, Khabarovsk Krai
- Kapova cave, Bashkortostan
- Sunduki Petroglyphs, Khakassia

=== Sweden ===
- Tanumshede (Bohuslän); World Heritage Site (1994)
- Himmelstalund (by Norrköping in Östergötland)
- Enköping (Uppland)
- Southwest Skåne (Götaland)
- Alvhem (Västra Götaland)
- Torhamn (Blekinge)
- Nämforsen (Ångermanland)
- Häljesta (Västmanland)
- Slagsta (Södermanland)
- Glösa (Jämtland)
- Gärde (Jämtland)
- Flatruet (Härjedalen)
- Grannberget (Härjedalen)
- The King's Grave at Kivik
- Fäbodristning from Dalarna
- Norrforsen (Umeå)
- Släbro rock carvings in Nyköping (Södermanland)

=== Turkey ===
- Kagizman, Kars
- Cunni Cave, Erzurum
- Esatli, Ordu
- Gevaruk Valley, Hakkâri
- Hakkari Trisin, Hakkâri
- Latmos / Beşparmak
- Güdül, Ankara

=== Ukraine ===
- Kamyana Mohyla, Zaporizhzhia Oblast
- Kurgan stelae

=== Wales ===
- Garn Turne, Pembrokeshire

== Central and South America and the Caribbean ==
=== Argentina ===
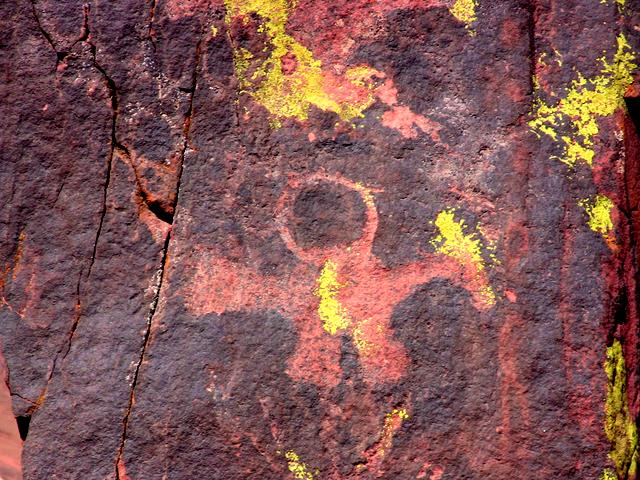
Talampaya National Park, La Rioja Province, Argentina

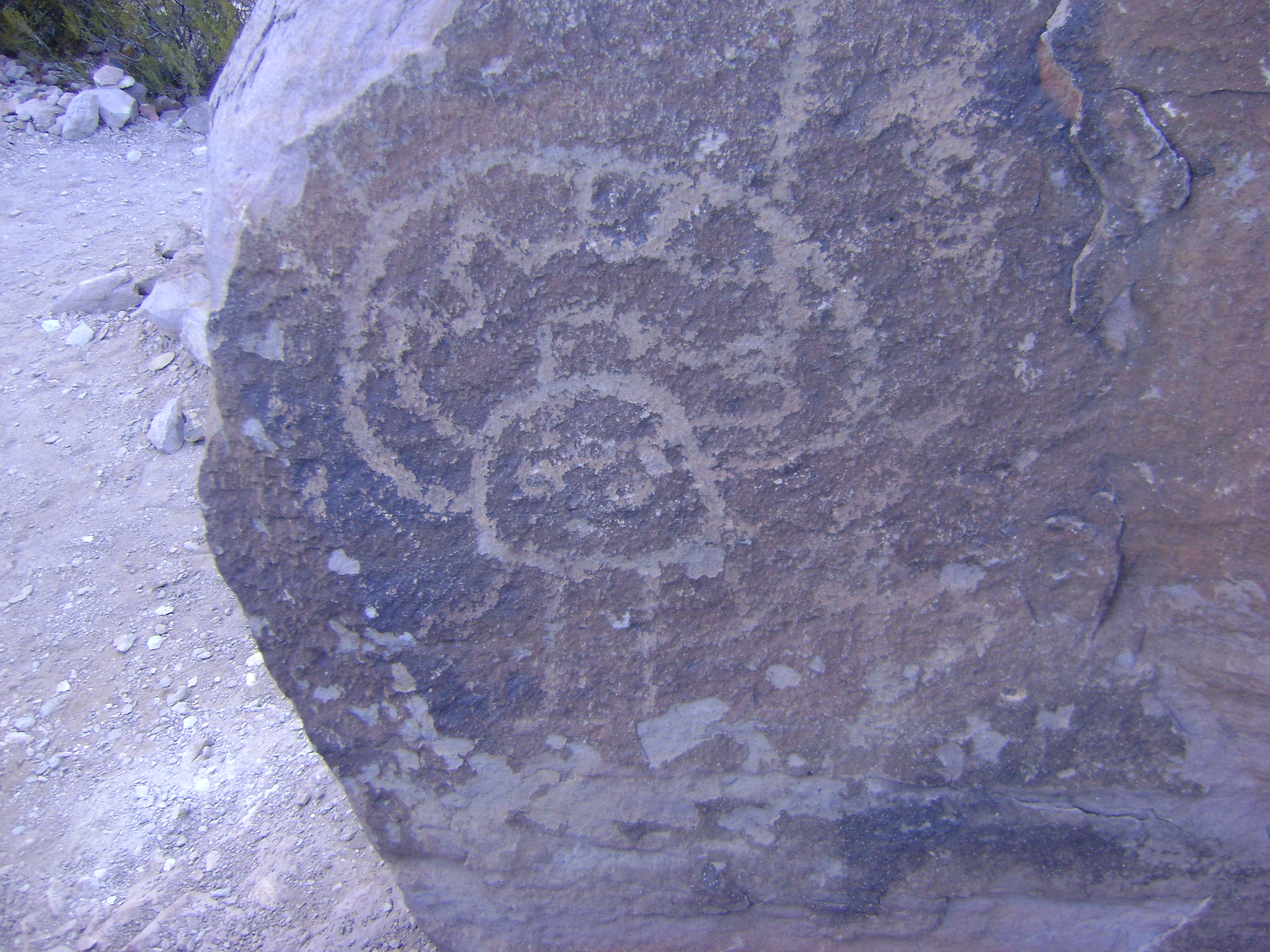
Petroglyph on Tunduqueral hill at Uspallata, Argentina

- Cueva de las Manos, Santa Cruz
- Talampaya National Park, La Rioja
- Lihué Calel National Park, La Pampa

=== Aruba ===
- Arikok National Park
- Quadiriki Caves
- Ayo Rock Formations

=== Brazil ===
The oldest reliably dated rock art in the Americas is known as the "Horny Little Man." It is petroglyph depicting a stick figure with an oversized phallus and carved in Lapa do Santo, a cave in central-eastern Brazil and dates from 12,000 to 9,000 years ago.

- Serra da Capivara National Park, a UNESCO World Heritage Site, Piauí
- Vale do Catimbau National Park, Pernambuco
- Ingá Stone, Paraíba
- Costao do Santinho, Santa Catarina
- Lagoa Santa (Holy Lake), Minas Gerais
- Ivolandia, Goiás
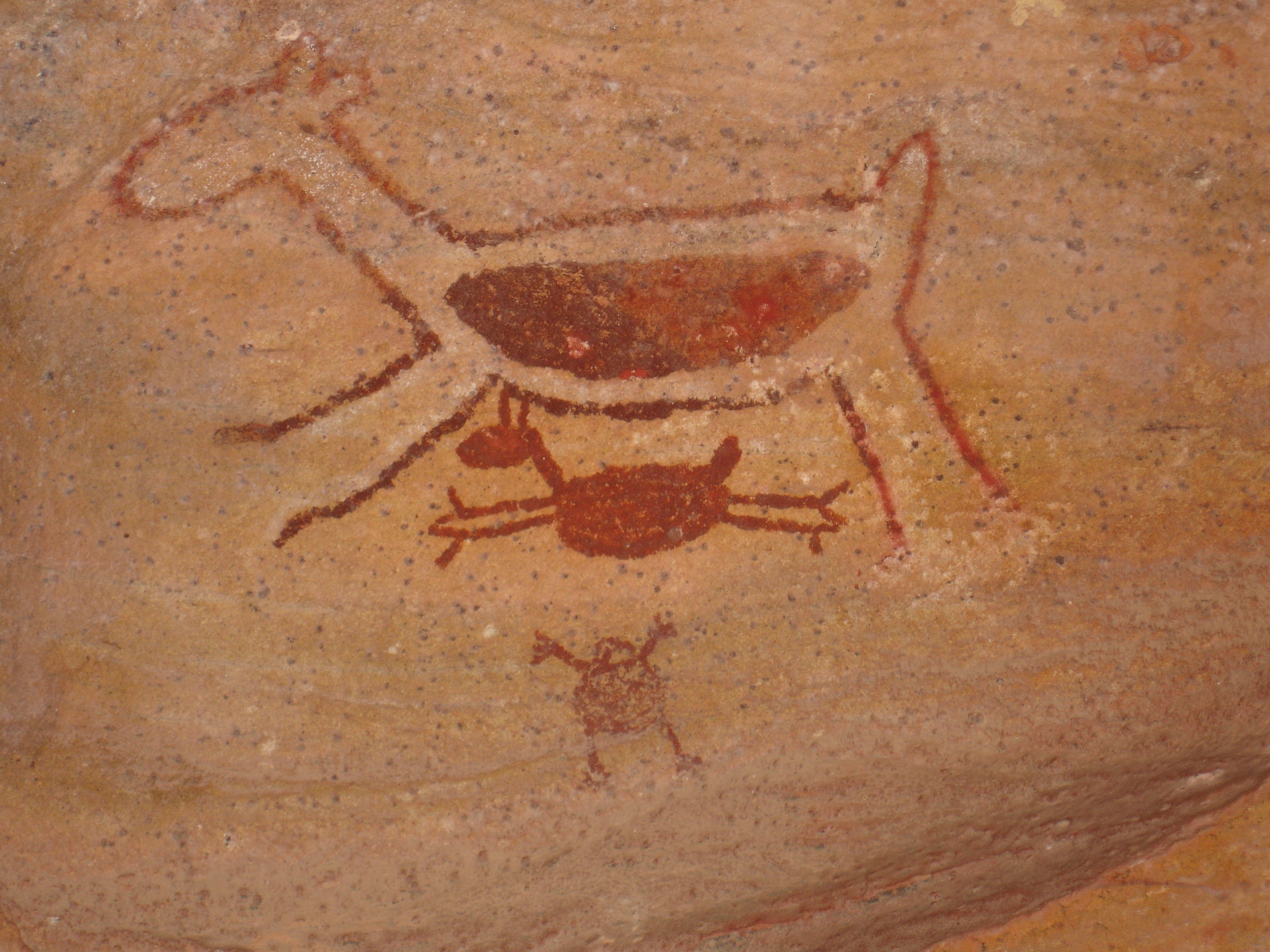
Capivara National Park, Piauí, Brazil

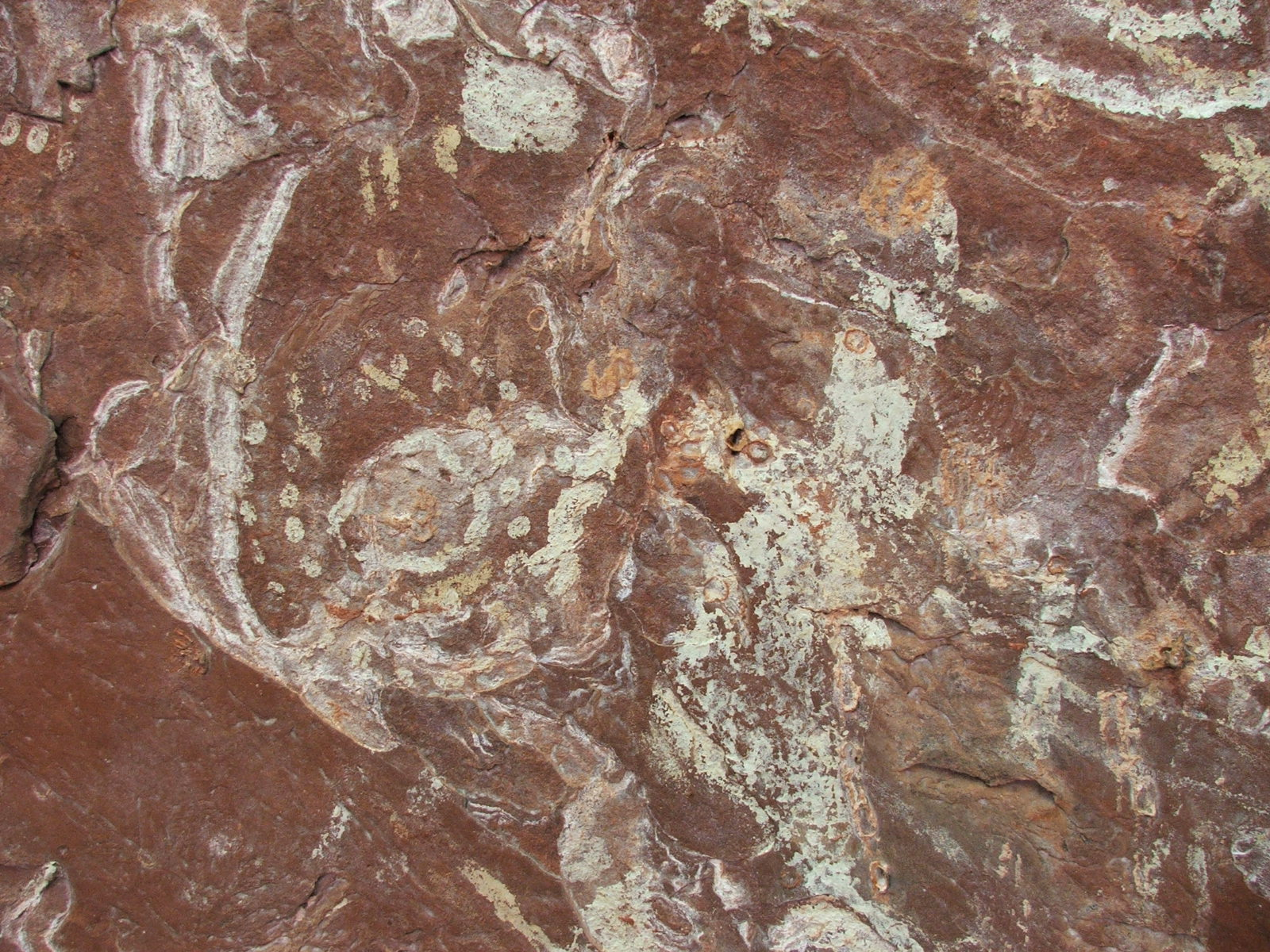
Ivolandia, Goiás, Brazil

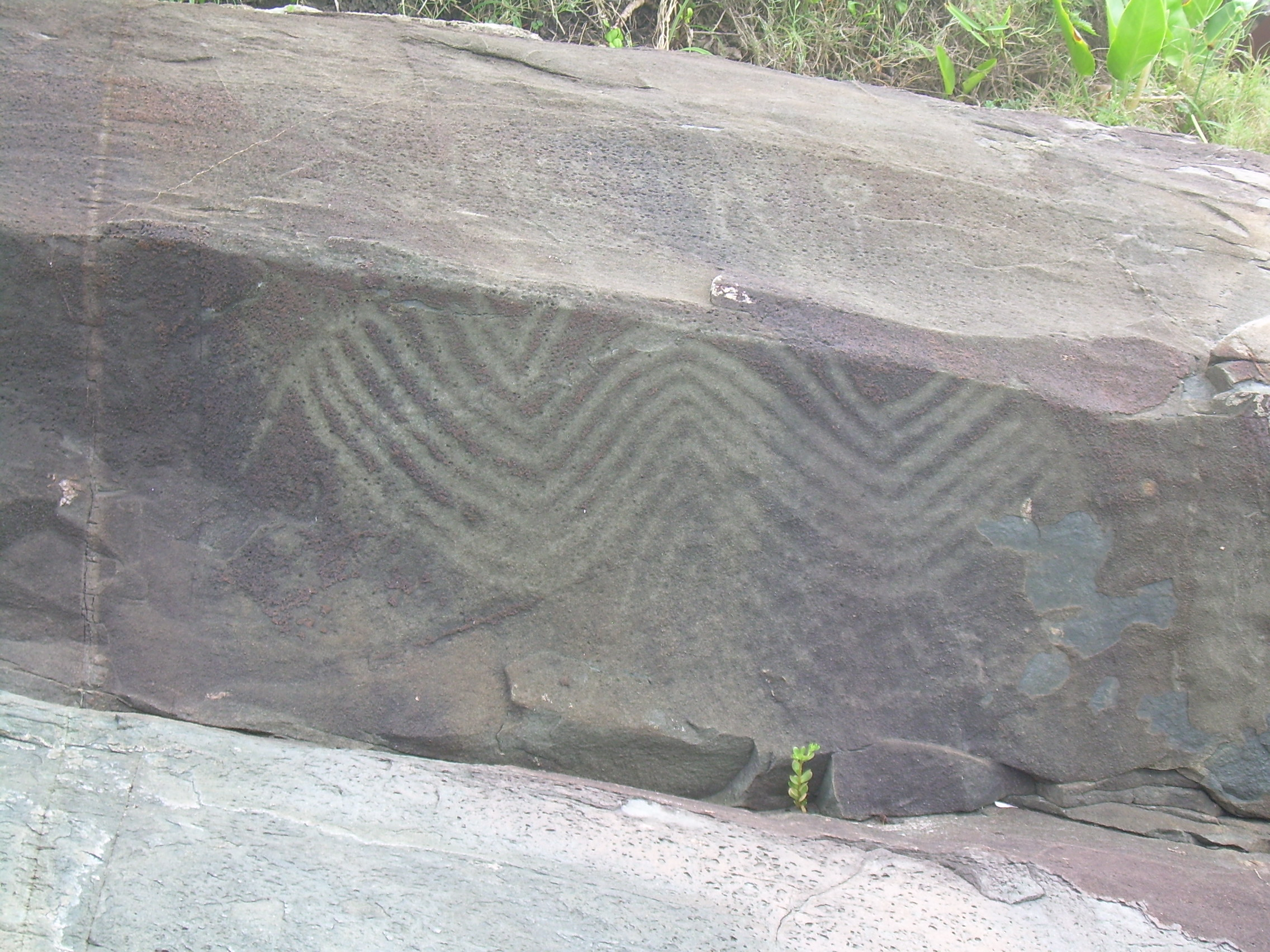
Costao do Santinho, SC, Brazil

=== Chile ===
- Rincón las Chilcas, Combarbalá
- Easter Island petroglyphs
Numerous rocks boasting thousand-year-old carvings.

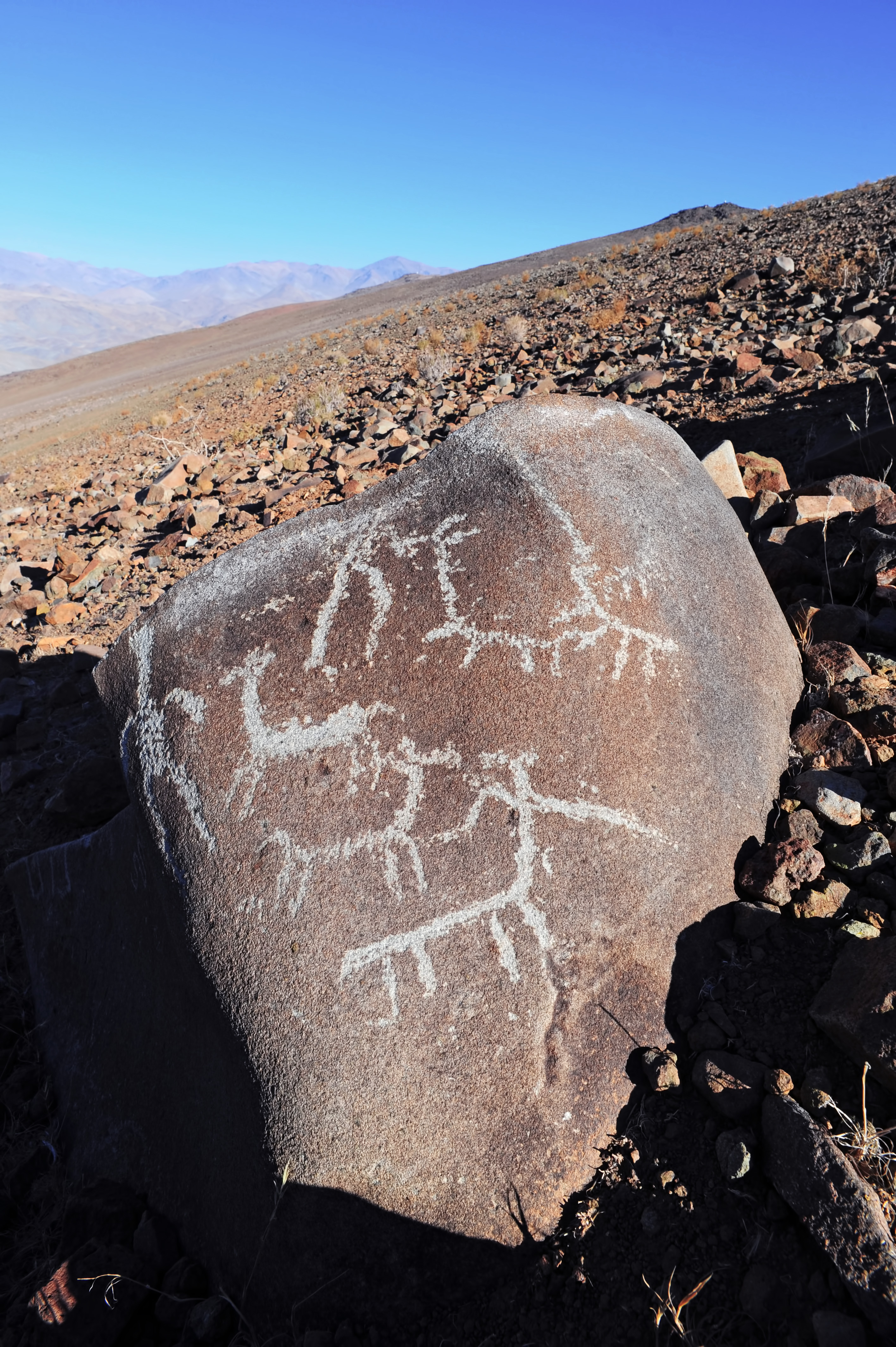
Llamas at La Silla

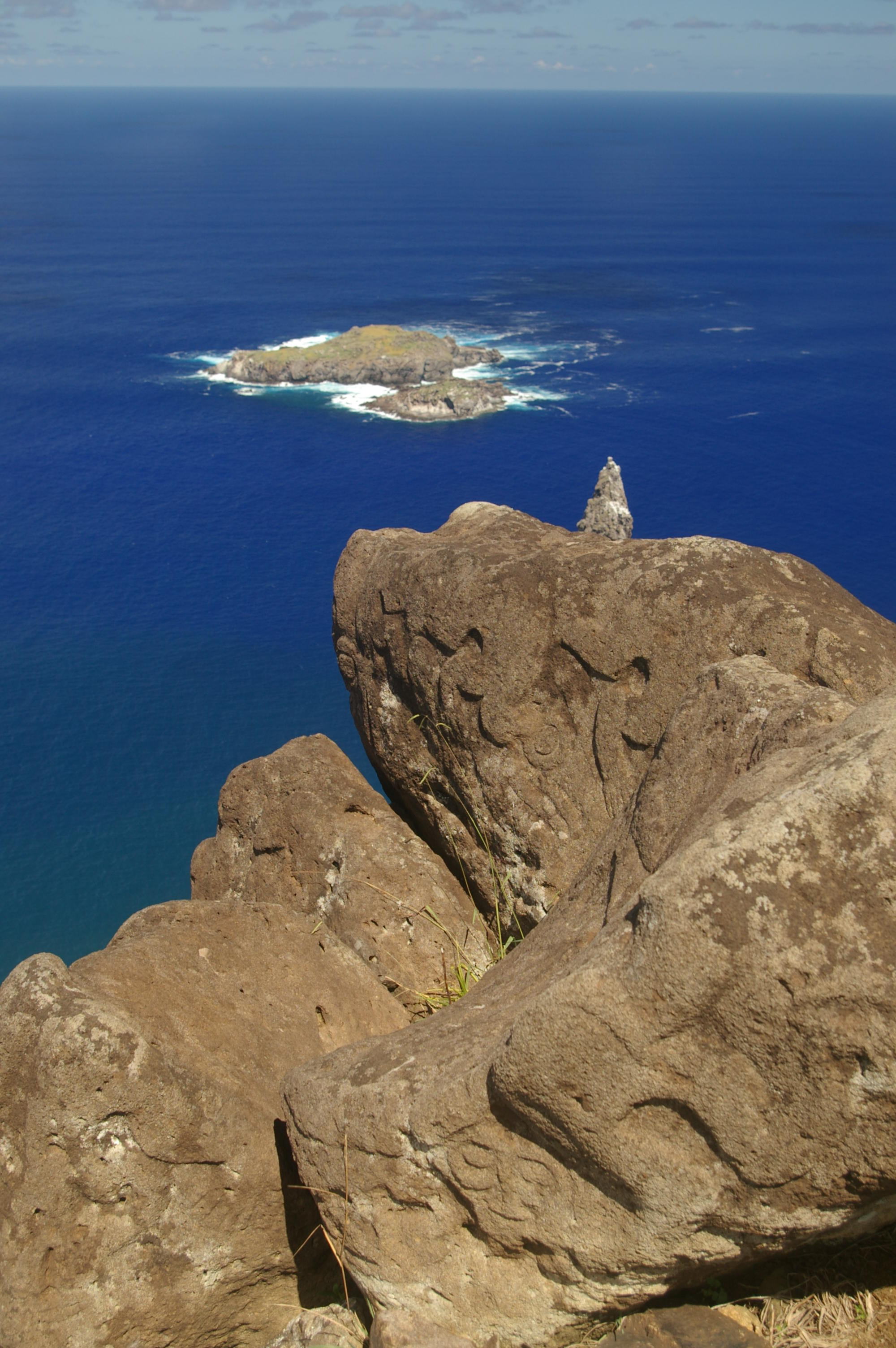
Petroglyphs at Orongo, Rapa Nui (Easter Island). A Makemake and two birdmen higher up

=== Colombia ===
- El Abra, Cundinamarca
- Chiribiquete Natural National Park
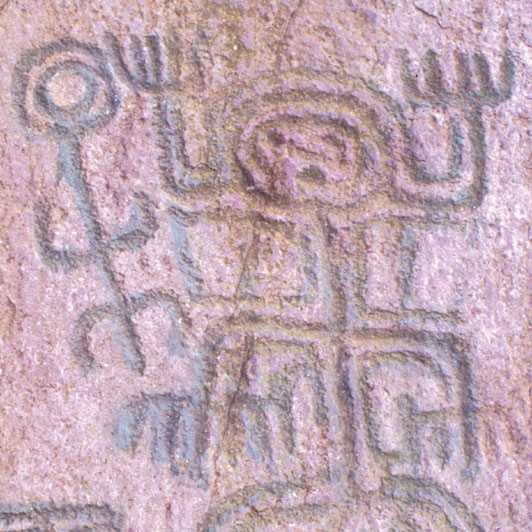
El Abra archaeological site, Cundinamarca

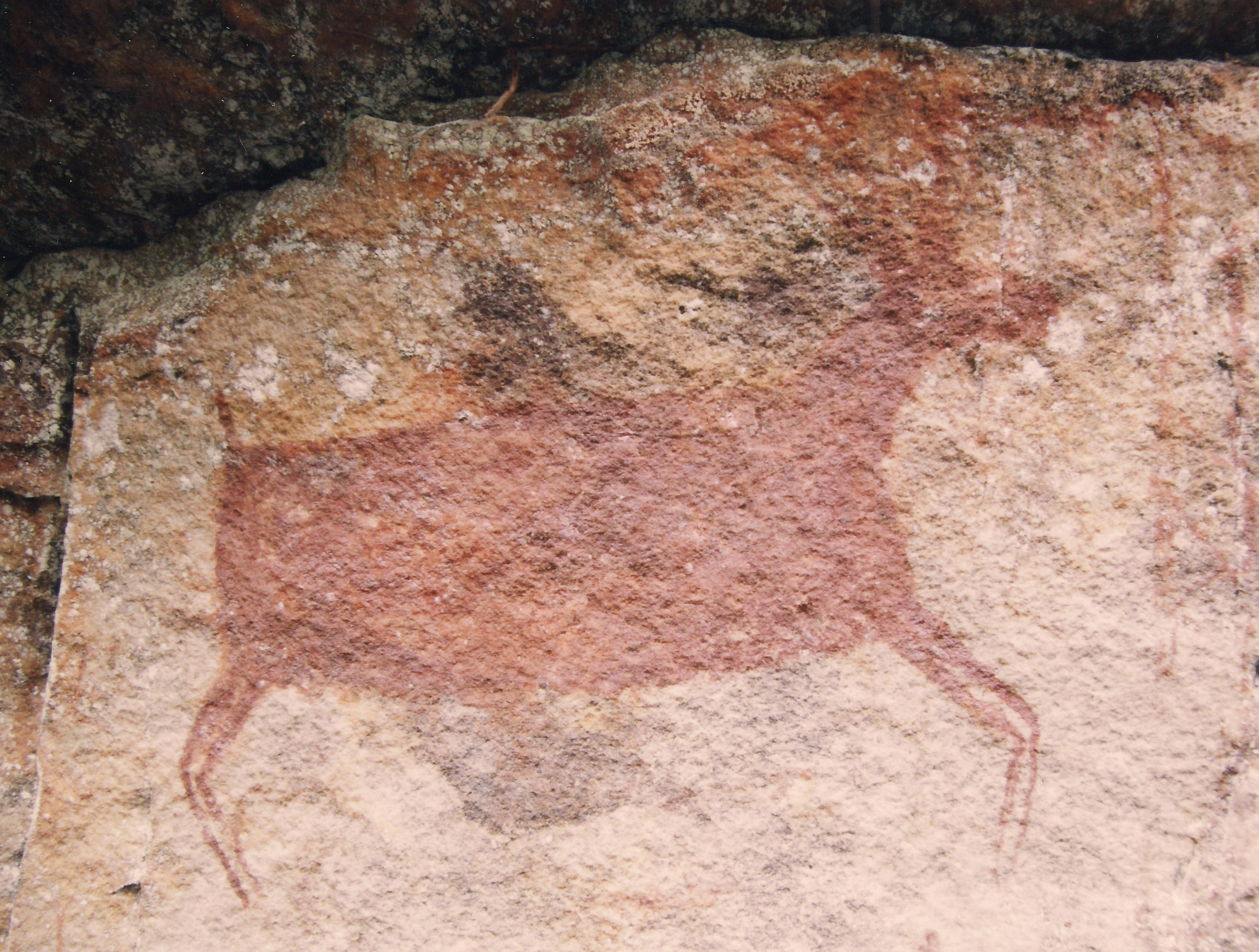
Petroglyph in the Chiribiquete Natural National Park. (Possible equine)

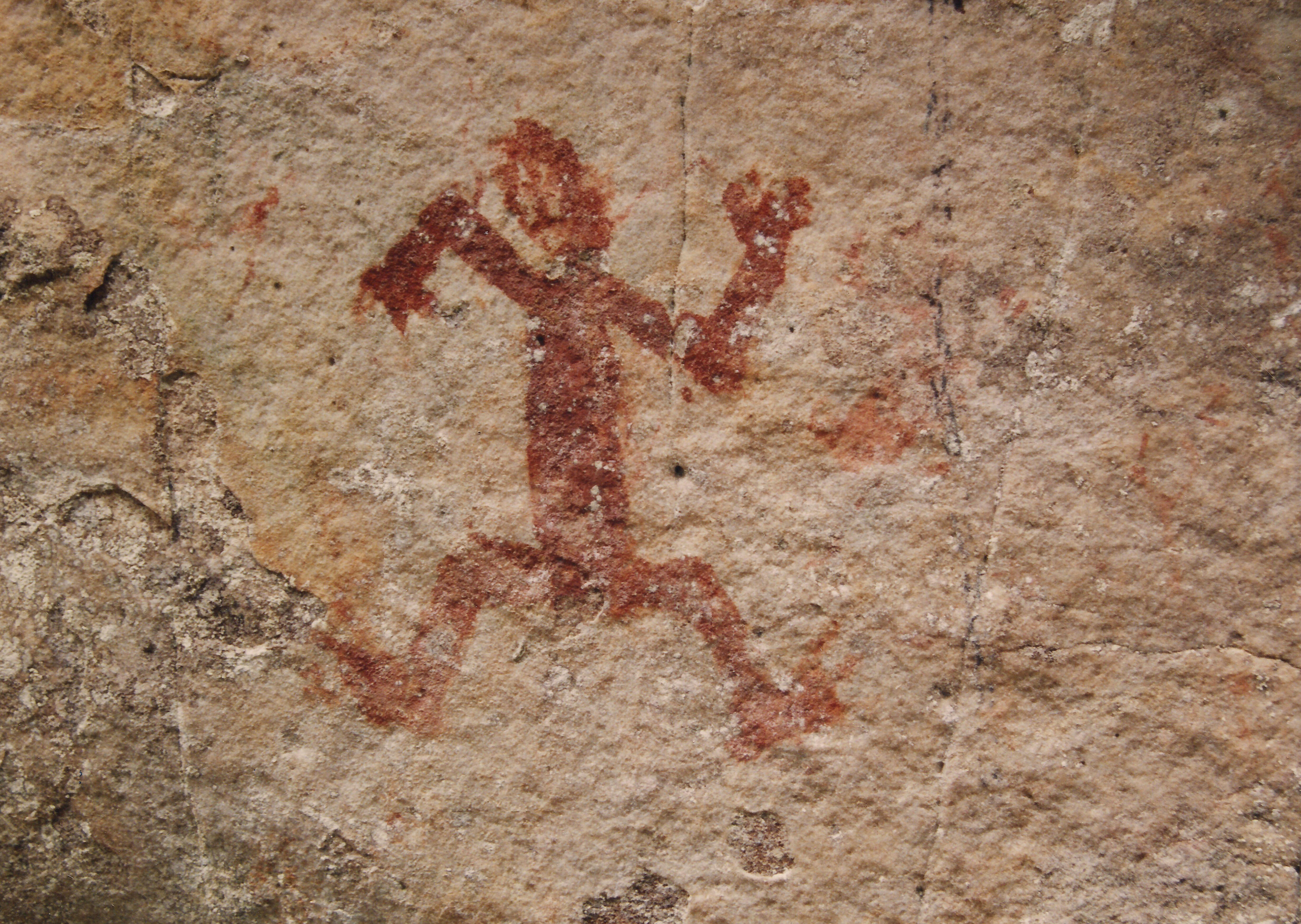
Petroglyph in the Chiribiquete Natural National Park. Aboriginal.

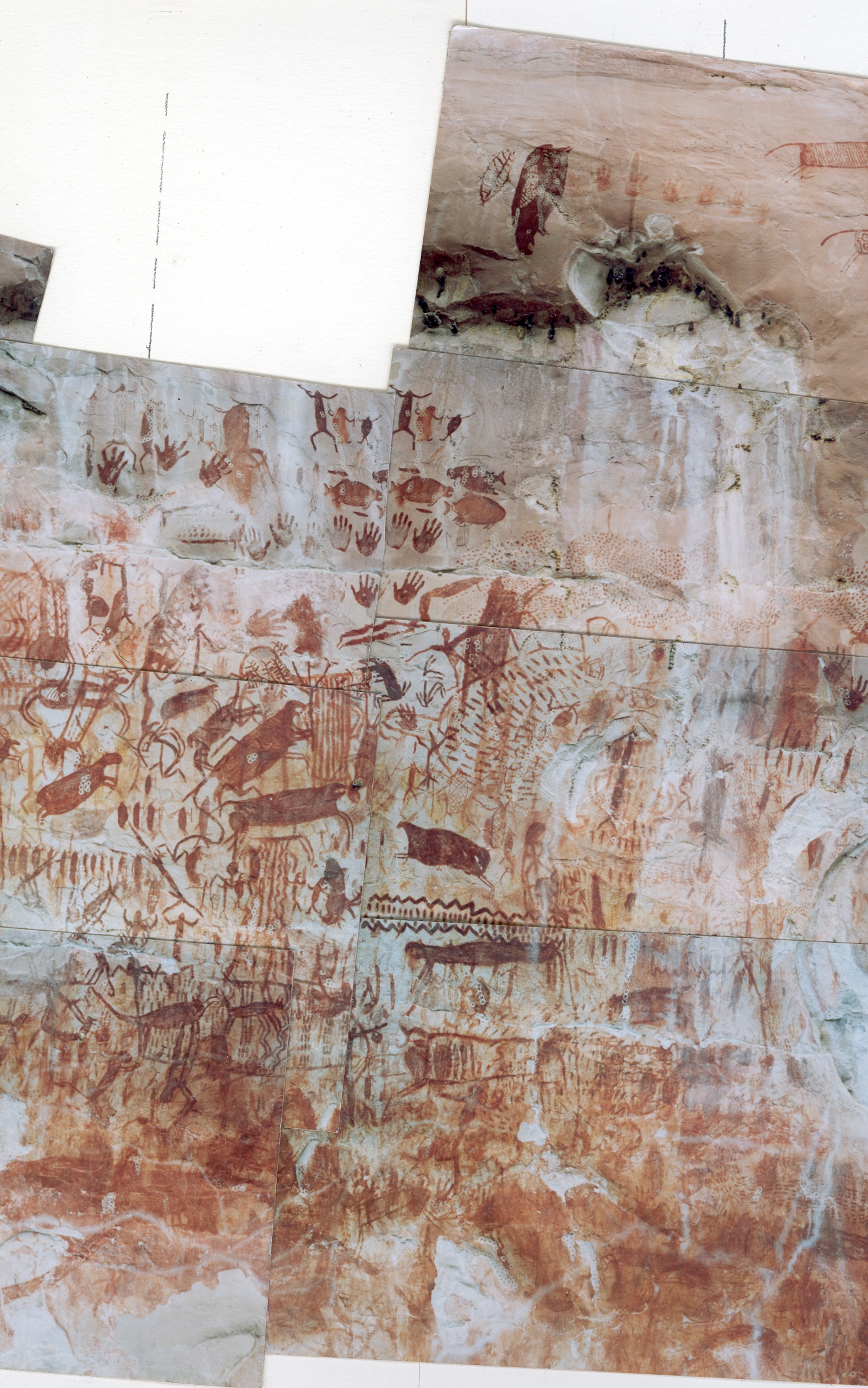
Petroglyphs in the Chiribiquete Natural National Park.

=== Costa Rica ===
- Rincon de la Vieja, Guanacaste

=== Dominican Republic ===
- Cueva de las Maravillas, San Pedro de Macorís
- Las Caritas, near Lake Enriquillo
- Los Tres Ojos, Santo Domingo

=== Grenada ===
- Mt. Rich Petroglyphs

=== Montserrat ===
- Soldier Ghaut petroglyphs

=== Nicaragua ===
- El Ceibo Petroglyphs, Ometepe, Rivas
- Ometepe Petroglyphs, Ometepe, Rivas

=== Paraguay ===
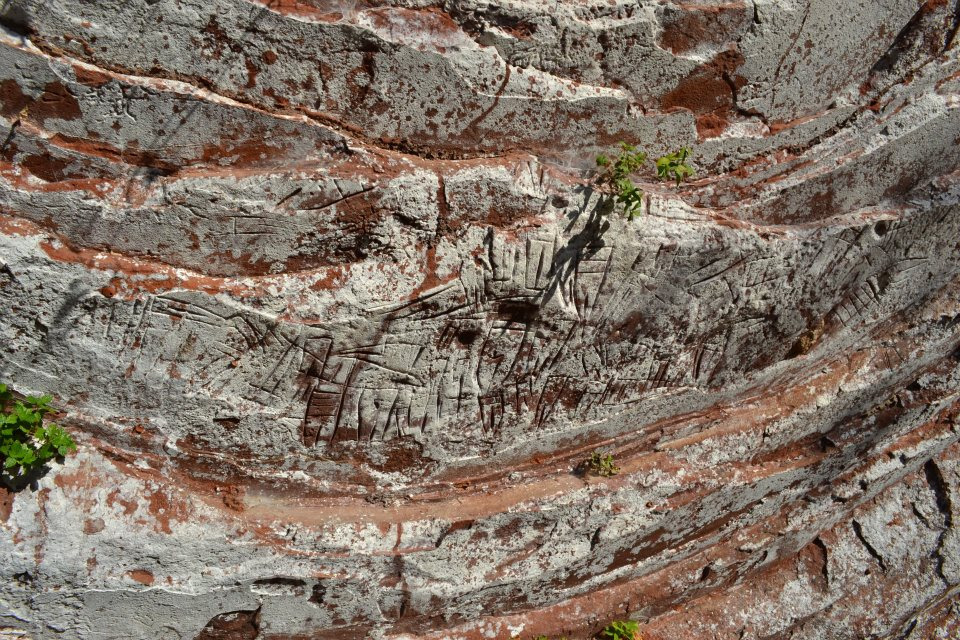
Fertility symbols, called "Ita Letra" by the local Panambi'y people, in a natural shelter in Amambay, Paraguay

- Amambay Department

=== Peru ===
- Cumbe Mayo, Cajamarca
- Petroglyphs of Pusharo, Manú National Park, Madre de Dios region
- Petroglyphs of Quiaca, Puno Region
- Petroglyphs of Jinkiori, Cusco Region
- Toro Muerto, Arequipa Region

=== Saint Kitts and Nevis ===
- Carib Petroglyphs, Wingfield Manor Estate, Saint Kitts

=== Suriname ===
- Corantijn Basin

=== Trinidad and Tobago ===
- Caurita
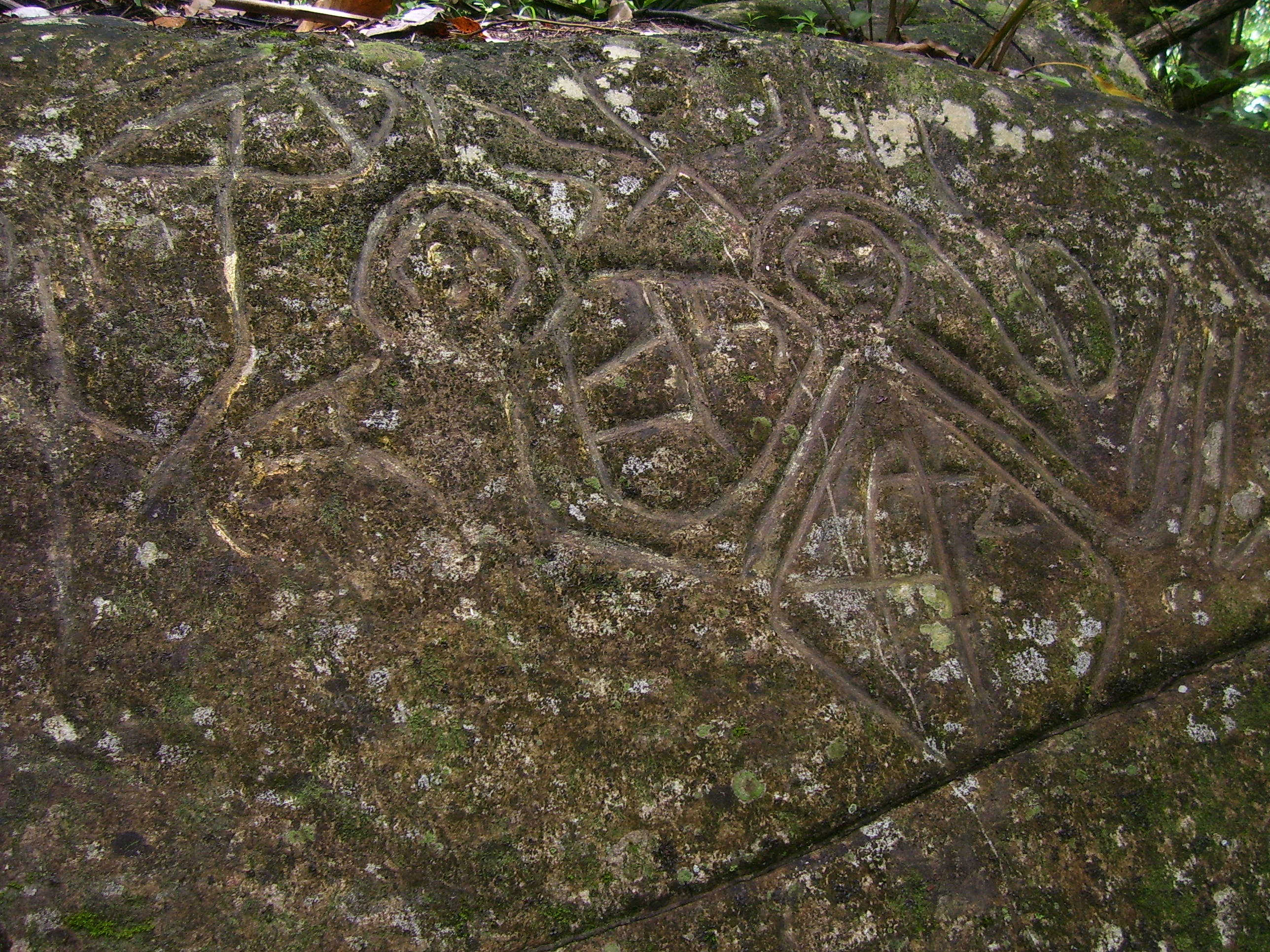
  The only known Amerindian petroglyph in Trinidad

=== Venezuela ===
- Caicara del Orinoco, Bolívar
- Morrocoy National Park, Falcón
- Piedra Pintada Archeological Park within San Esteban National Park, Guaraca, Carabobo
- Sardinata Beach, Amazonas
- Taima Taima, Falcón

== North America ==
=== Canada ===
- Kejimkujik National Park, Nova Scotia
- Petroglyph Provincial Park, Nanaimo, British Columbia
- Petroglyphs Provincial Park, north of Peterborough, Ontario
- Agnes Lake, Quetico Provincial Park, Ontario
- Sproat Lake Provincial Park, near Port Alberni, British Columbia
- Stuart Lake, British Columbia
- St. Victor Provincial Park, Saskatchewan
- Writing-on-Stone Provincial Park, east of Milk River, Alberta
- Gabriola Island, British Columbia
- East Sooke Regional Park, British Columbia
- Ancient Echoes Interpretive Centre, Herschel Saskatchewan
- Lake Temagami, Ontario

=== Mexico ===
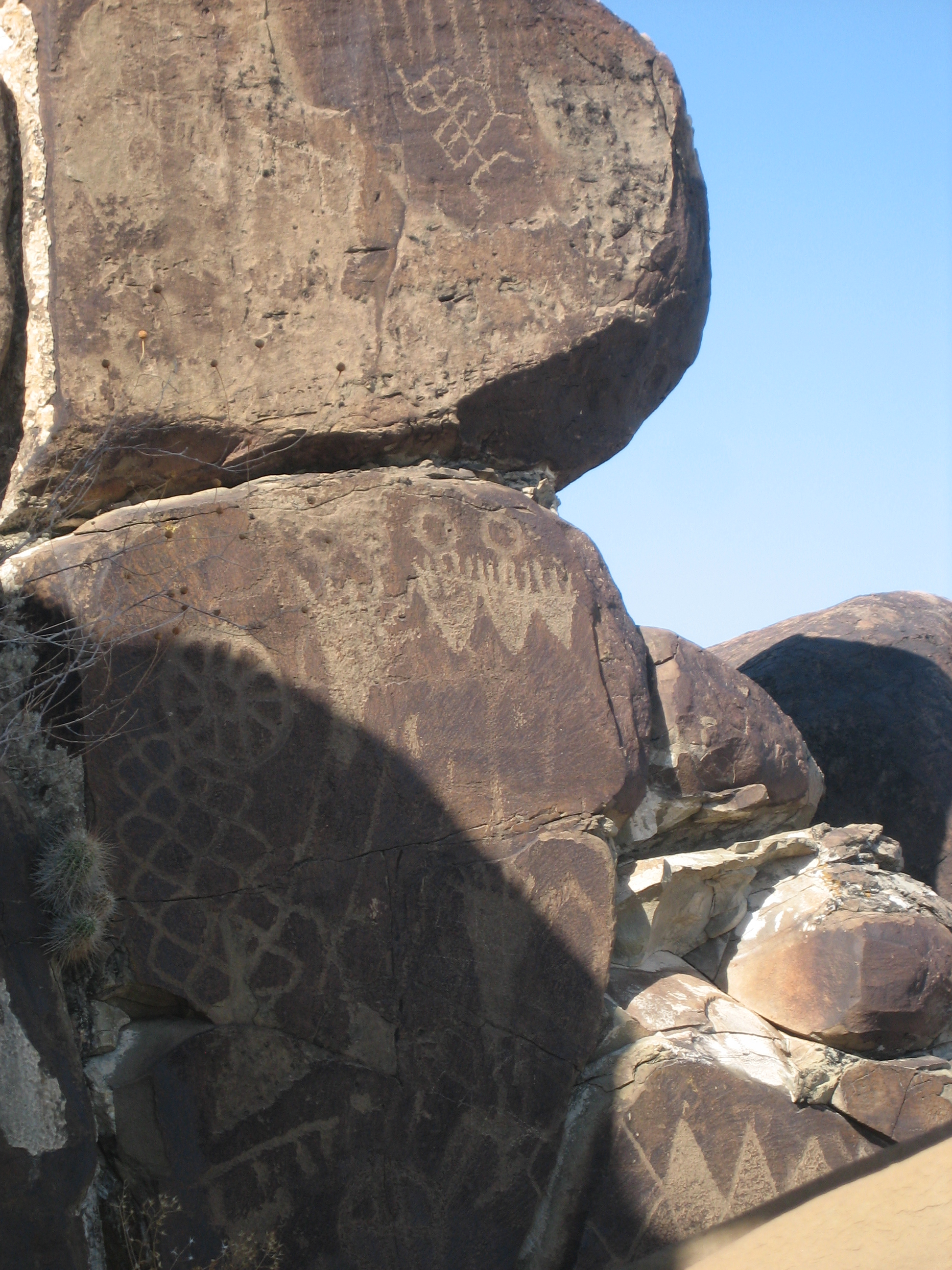
Near Parras, Coahuila

- Boca de Potrerillos, Mina, Nuevo León
- Chiquihuitillos, Mina, Nuevo León
- Cuenca del Río Victoria, near Xichú, Guanajuato
- Coahuiltecan Cueva Ahumada, Nuevo León
- La Proveedora, Caborca, Sonora
- Samalayuca, Juarez, Chihuahua
- Las Labradas, near Mazatlán, Sinaloa

=== United States ===
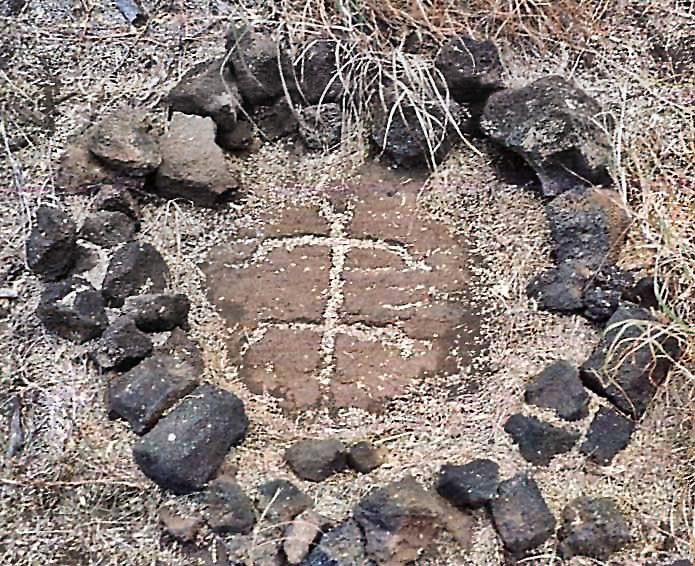
Petroglyph on western coast of Hawaii

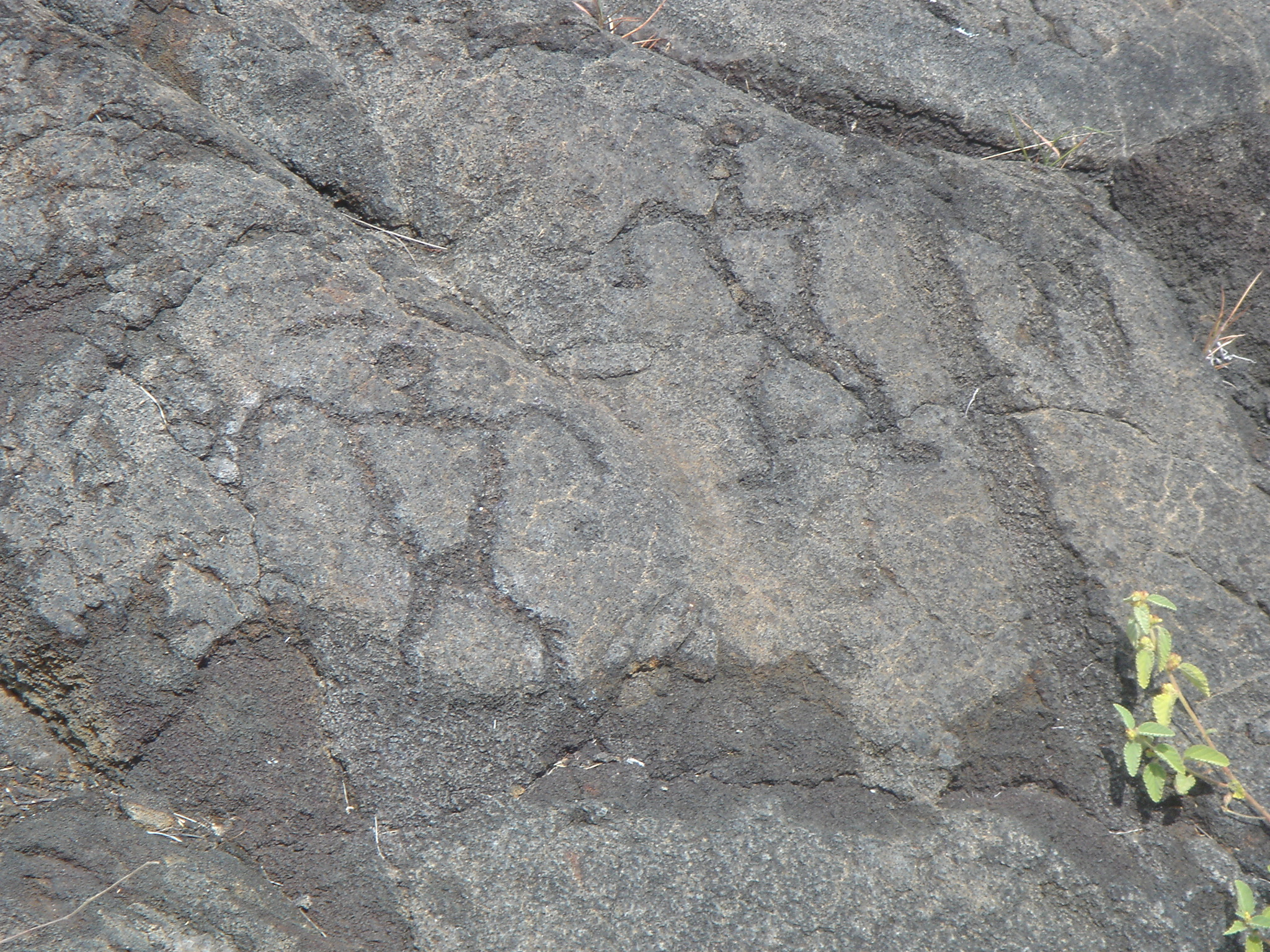
Hawaiʻi Volcanoes National Park

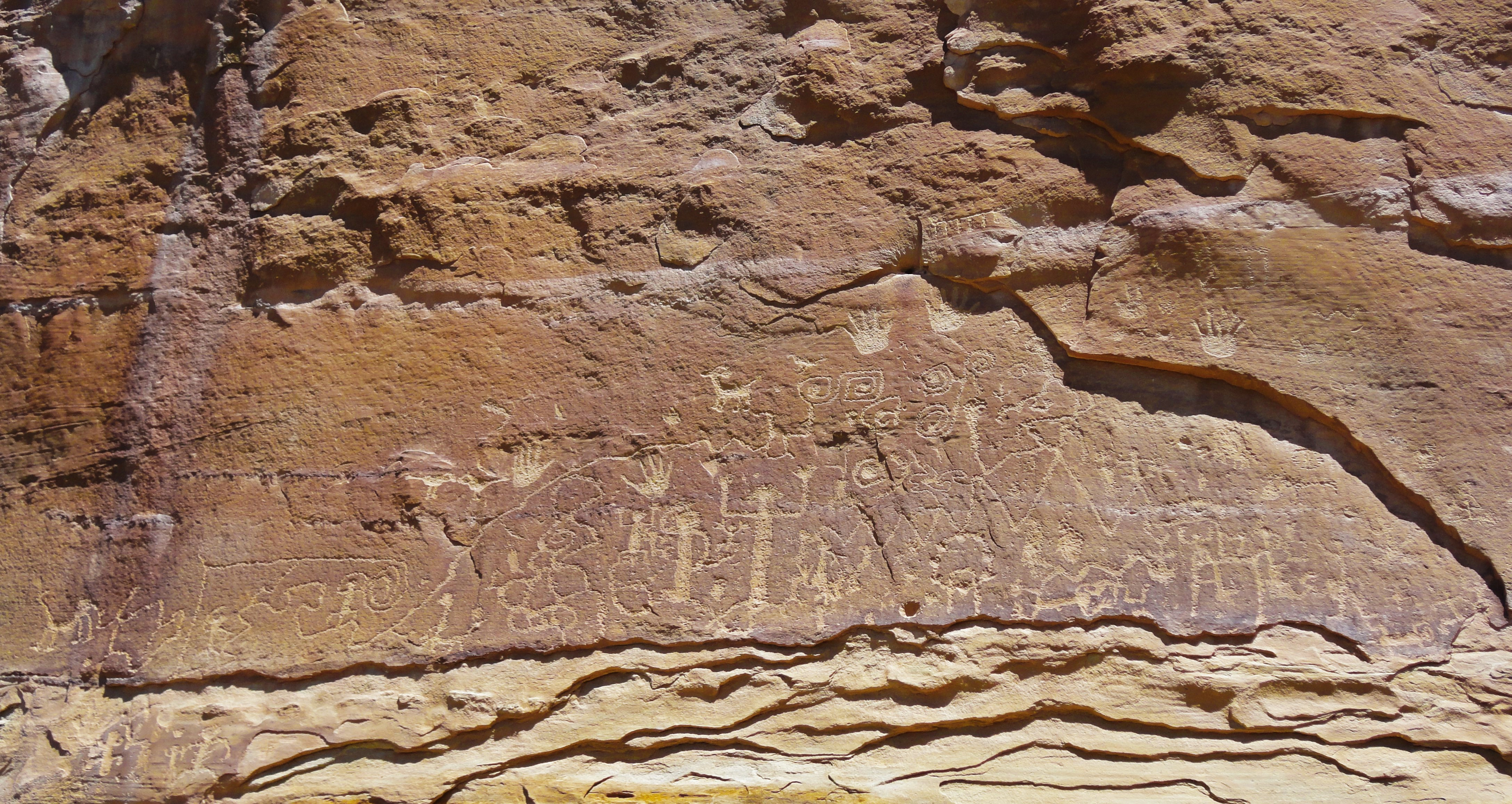
Modern Hopi have interpreted the petroglyphs at Mesa Verde National Park's Petroglyph Point as depictions of the Eagle, Mountain Sheep, Parrot, Horned Toad, and Mountain Lion clans, and the Ancestral Puebloans who inhabited the mesa

- Arches National Park, Utah
- Bandelier National Monument, New Mexico
- Barnesville Petroglyph, Ohio
- Bloomington Petroglyph Park, Utah
- Capitol Reef National Park, Utah
- Caguana Indian Park, Utuado, Puerto Rico
- Columbia Hills State Park, Washington
- Corn Springs, Colorado Desert, California
- Coso Rock Art District, Coso Range, northern Mojave Desert, California
- Death Valley National Park, California
- Dinosaur National Monument, Colorado and Utah
- Dighton Rock, Massachusetts
- Dominguez Canyon Wilderness, Colorado
- Fremont Indian State Park Utah
- Ginkgo Petrified Forest State Park Washington
- Grand Traverse Bay Michigan
- Great Basin National Park Nevada
- Grimes Point, Nevada
- Independence Slab, Ohio
- Inscription Rock (Kelleys Island, Ohio), Ohio
- Jeffers Petroglyphs, Minnesota
- Judaculla Rock, North Carolina
- Kanopolis State Park, Kansas
- La Cueva del Indio (Indians Cave), Arecibo, Puerto Rico
- La Piedra Escrita (The Written Rock), Jayuya, Puerto Rico
- Lava Beds National Monument, Tule Lake, California
- Legend Rock Petroglyph Site, Thermopolis, Wyoming
- Lemonweir Glyphs, Wisconsin
- Leo Petroglyph, Leo, Ohio
- Mammoth Cave National Park, Kentucky
- Mesa Verde National Park, Colorado
- Newspaper Rock State Historic Monument, Utah
- Olympic National Park, Washington
- Paintlick Mountain, Tazewell, Virginia
- Petit Jean State Park, Arkansas
- Petrified Forest National Park Arizona
- Petroglyph National Monument, New Mexico
- Picacho Mountain, Picacho Arizona
- Picture Canyon, Flagstaff, Arizona
- Picture Rocks, Picture Rocks, Arizona
- Puye Cliff Dwellings, New Mexico
- Red Rock Canyon National Conservation Area, Nevada
- Rochester Rock Art Panel, Utah
- Ring Mountain, Marin County, California
- Saint John, U.S. Virgin Islands
- Sanilac Petroglyphs Historic State Park, Sanilac County, Michigan
- Sedona, Arizona
- Seminole Canyon, Texas
- Sloan Canyon National Conservation Area, Nevada
- South Mountain Park, Arizona
- The Cove Palisades State Park, Oregon
- Three Rivers Petroglyphs, New Mexico
- Tibes Indian Park, Ponce, Puerto Rico
- Valley of Fire State Park, Nevada
- Washington State Park, Washington County, Missouri
- West Virginia glyphs
- White Mountain (Wyoming), Rock Springs, Wyoming
- White Tank Mountain Regional Park, Waddell, Arizona
- Winnemucca Lake, Nevada
- Writing Rock State Historical Site, North Dakota
- Monolyth at Caguas & El Yunque, Puerto Rico
- Track Rock, Union County Georgia
- Forsyth Petroglyph Originally discovered, locates and documented near Cumming, Georgia in Forsyth County but has been relocated to the campus of the University of Georgia in Athens, Georgia
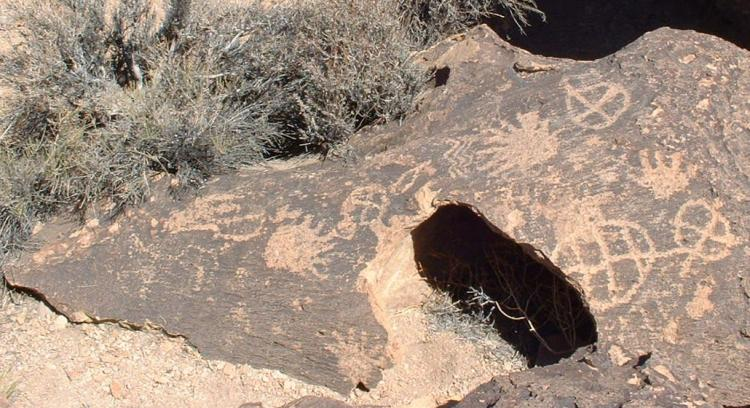
Petroglyphs on a Bishop Tuff tableland, eastern California

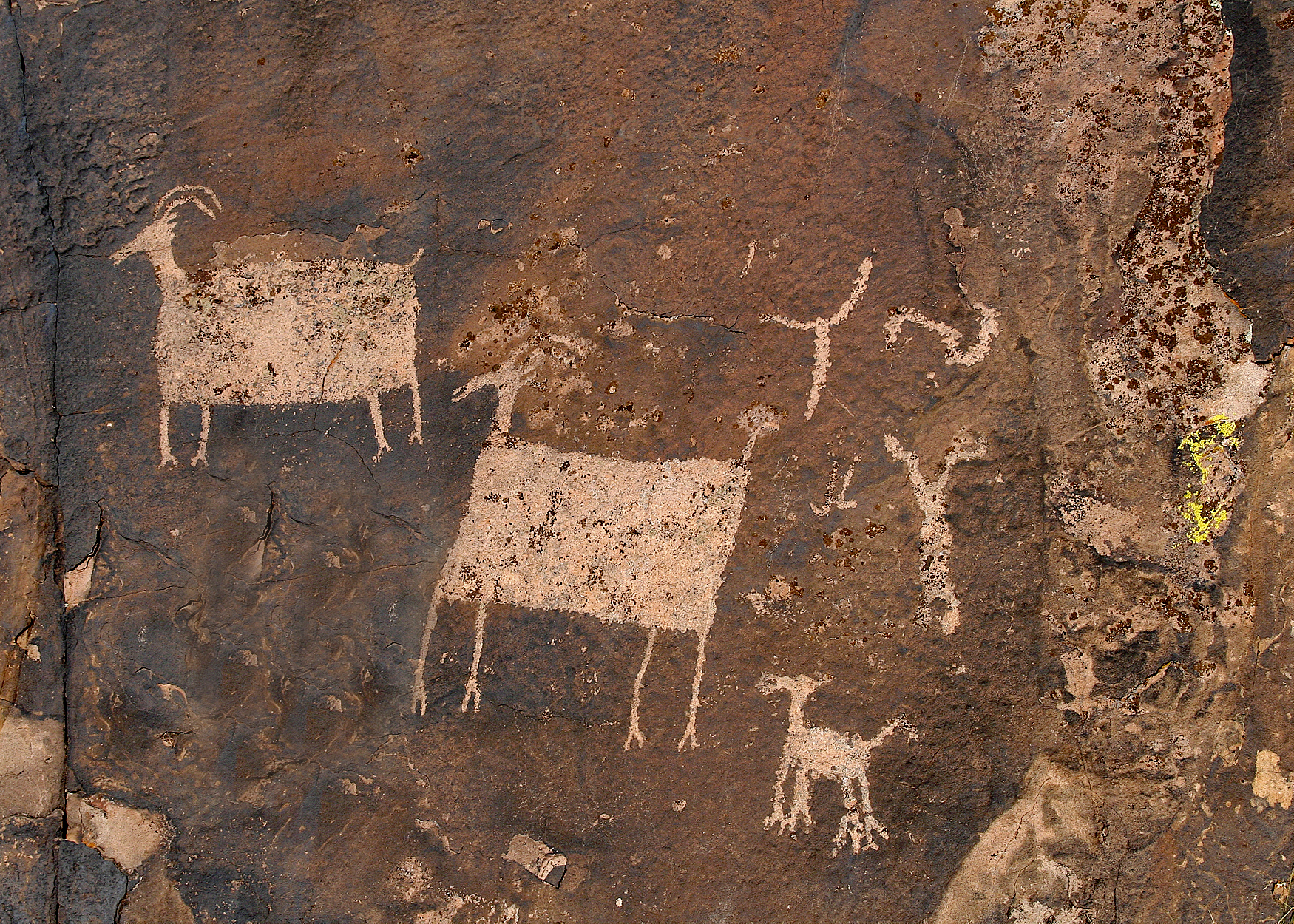
Southern Utah

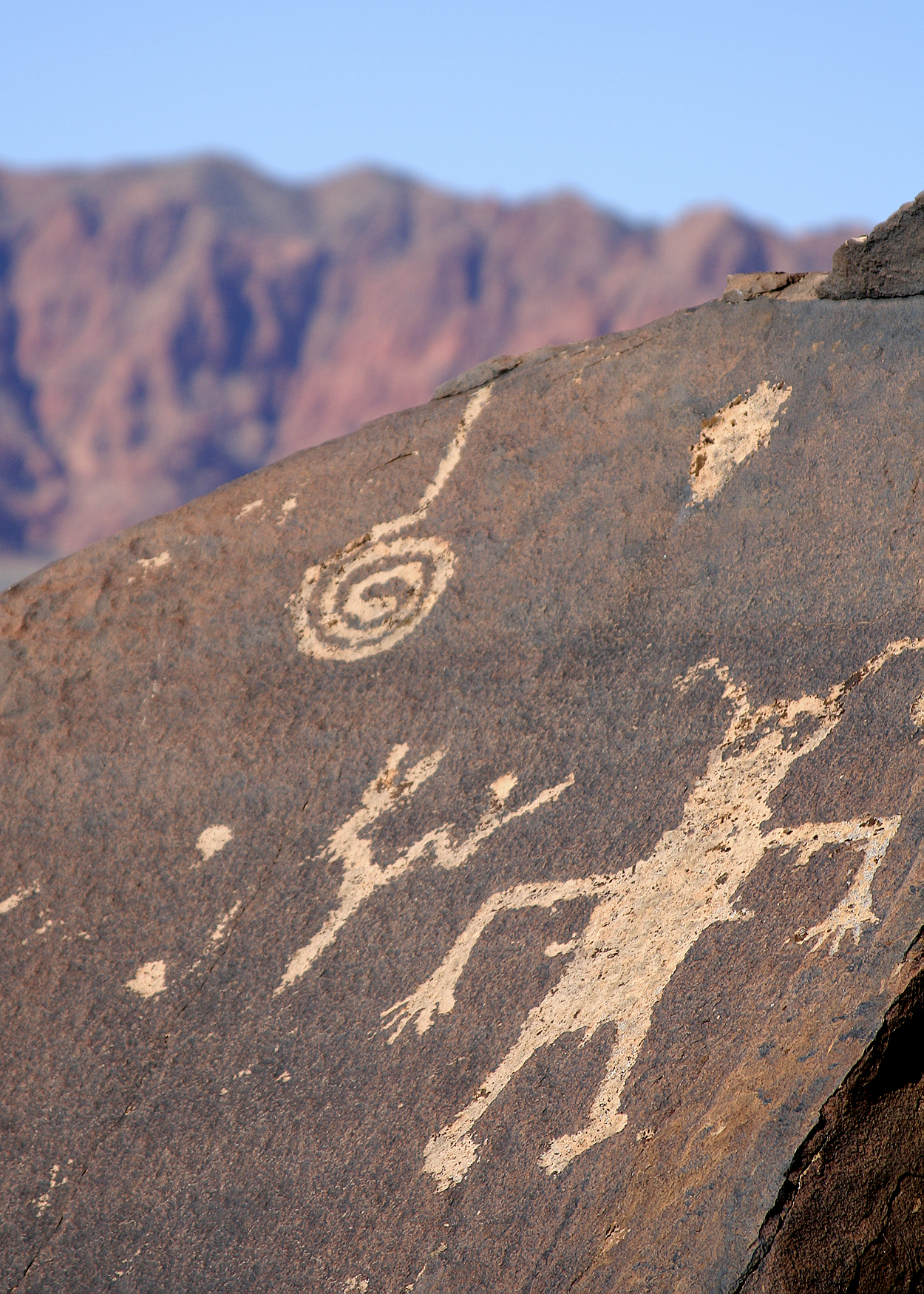
Southern Utah

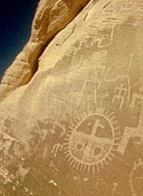
Utah

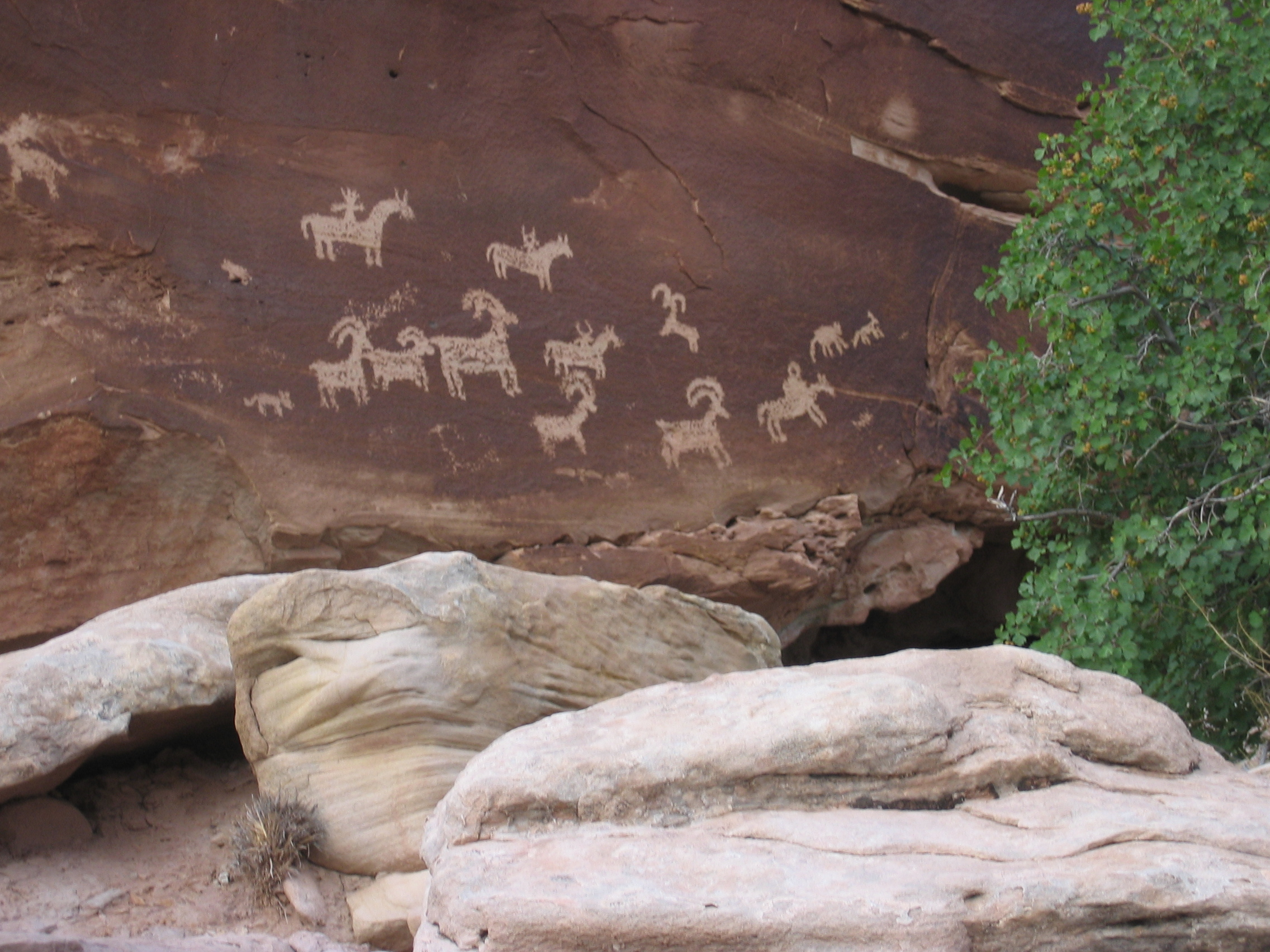
Arches National Park

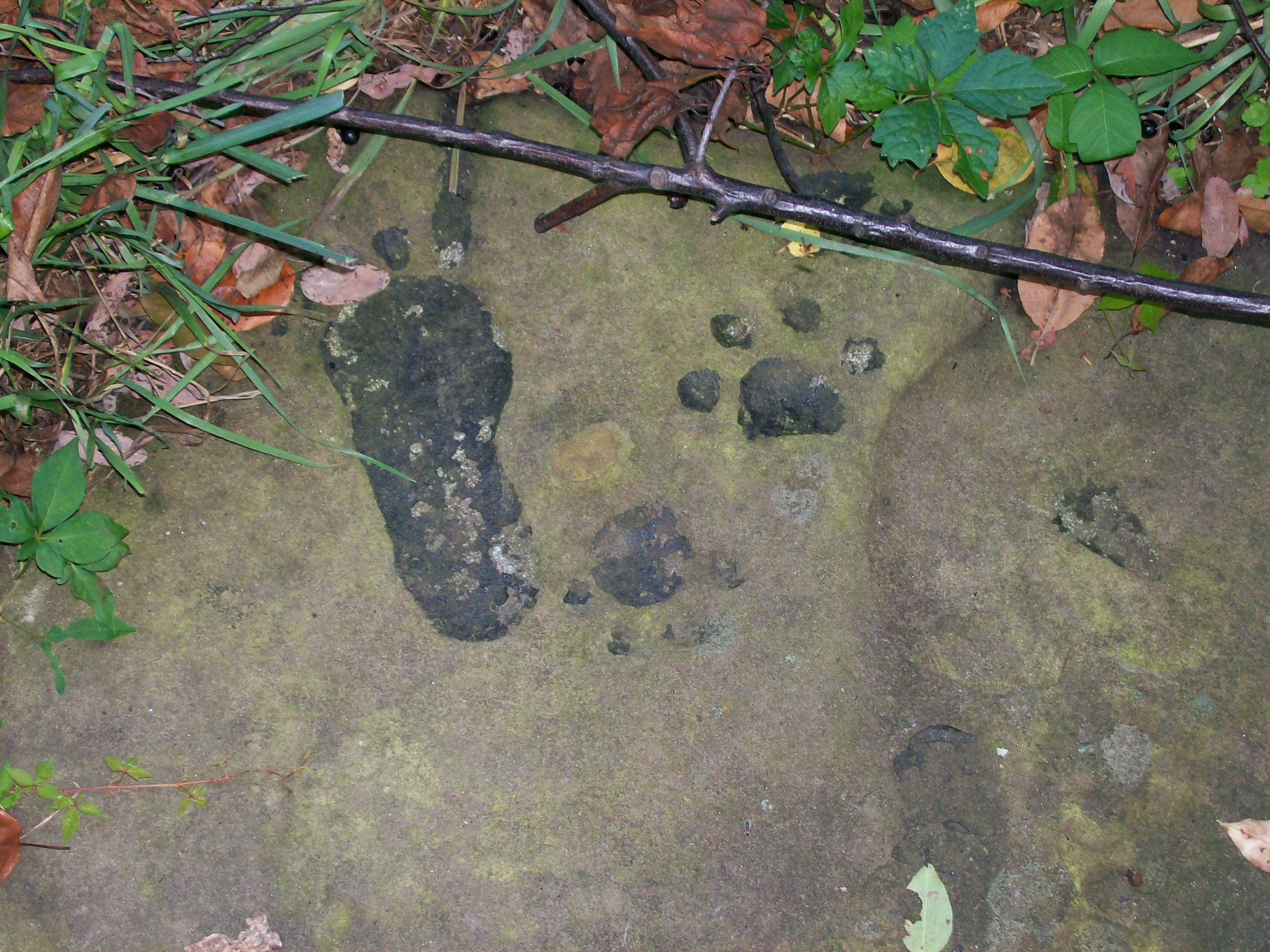
Animal print carvings outside of Barnesville, Ohio

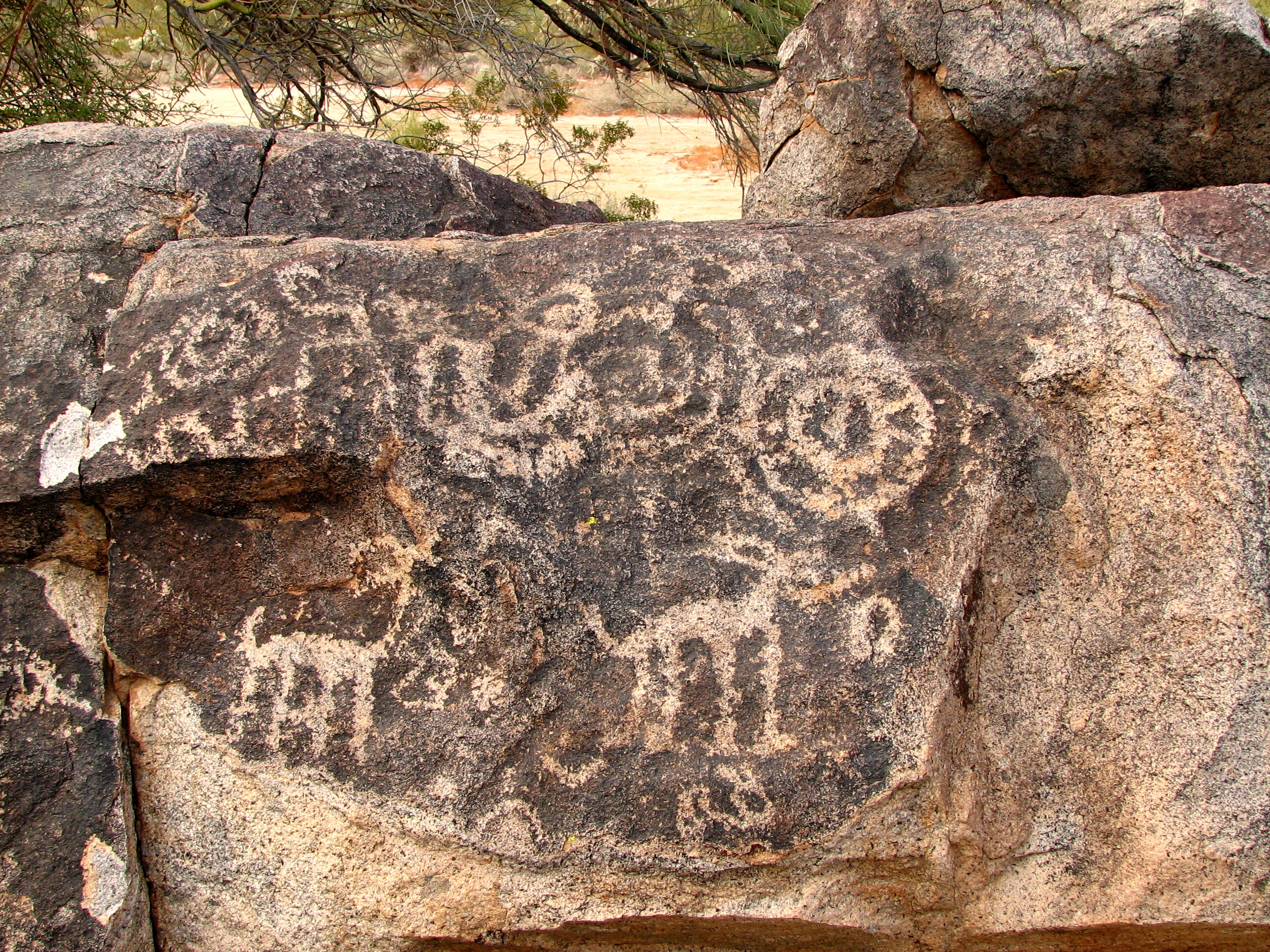
Arizona

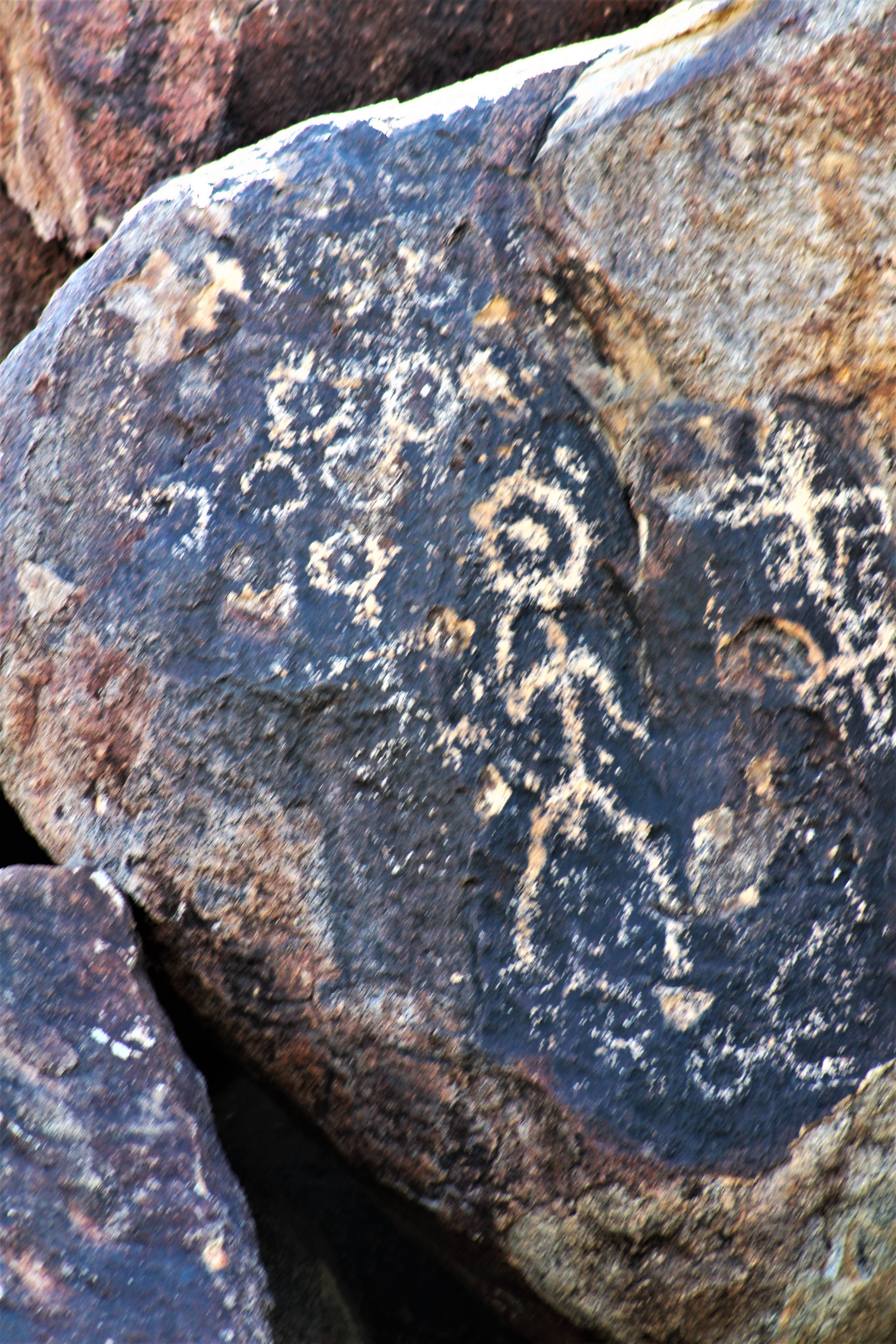
Picacho Mountain Petroglyphs

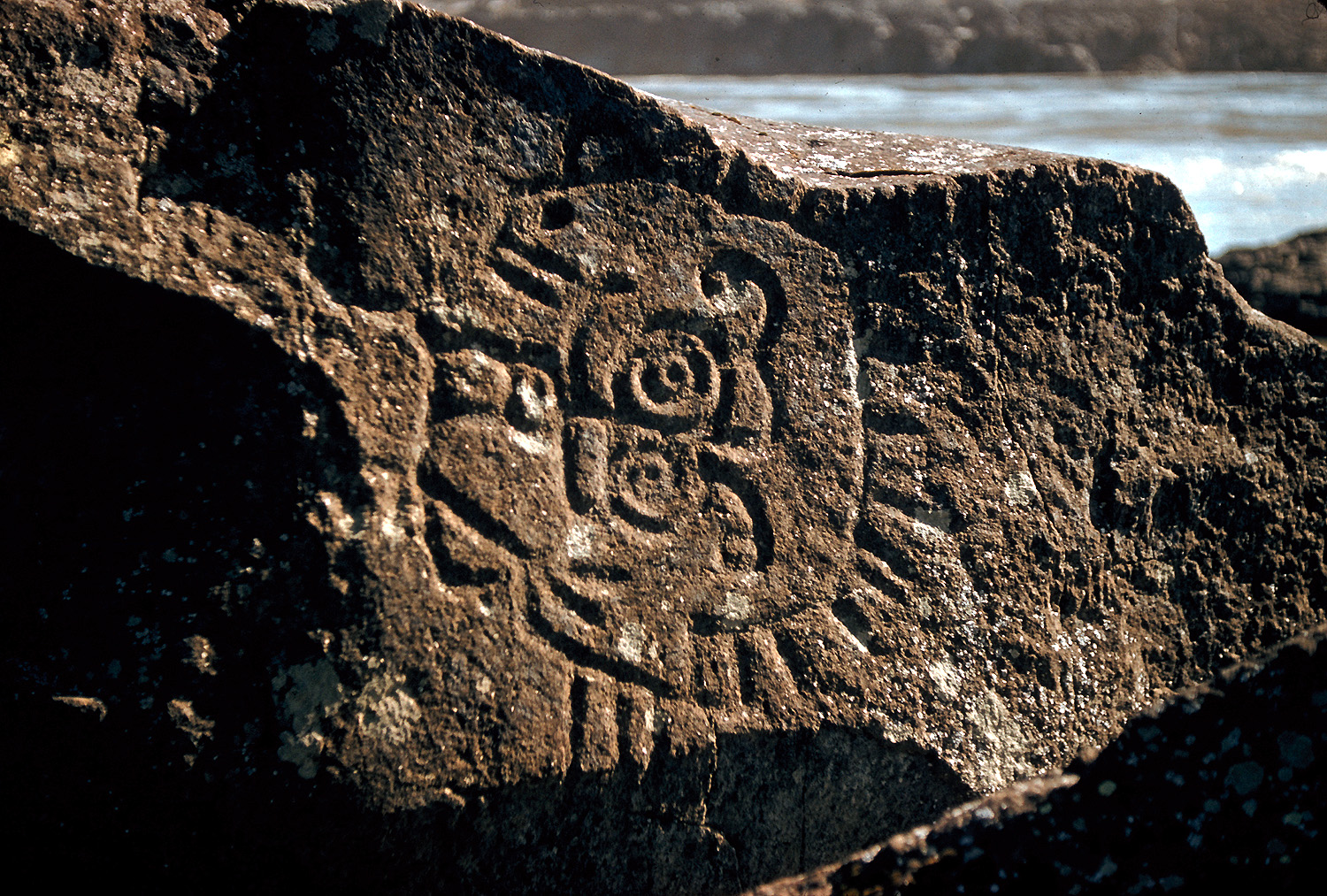
Columbia River Gorge, Washington

Upside-down man in Western Colorado

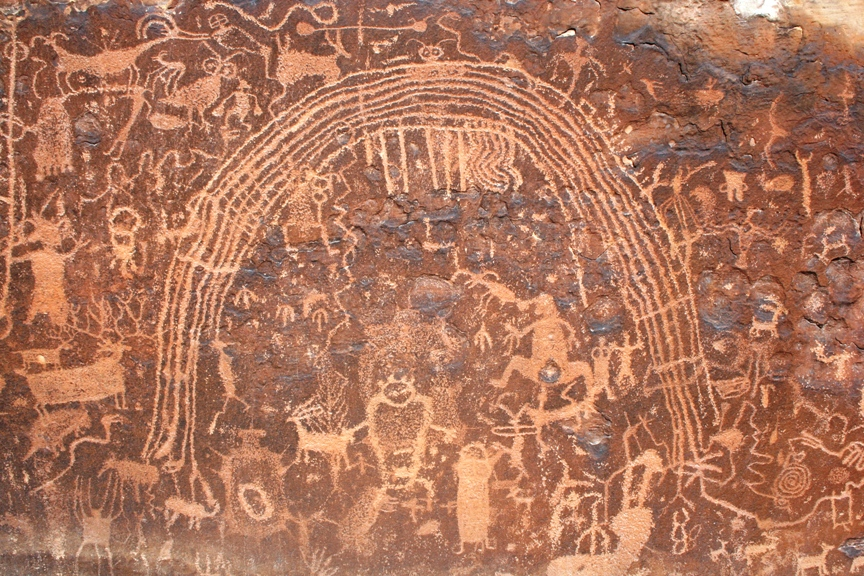
Rochester Rock Art Panel in the San Rafael Swell in Utah

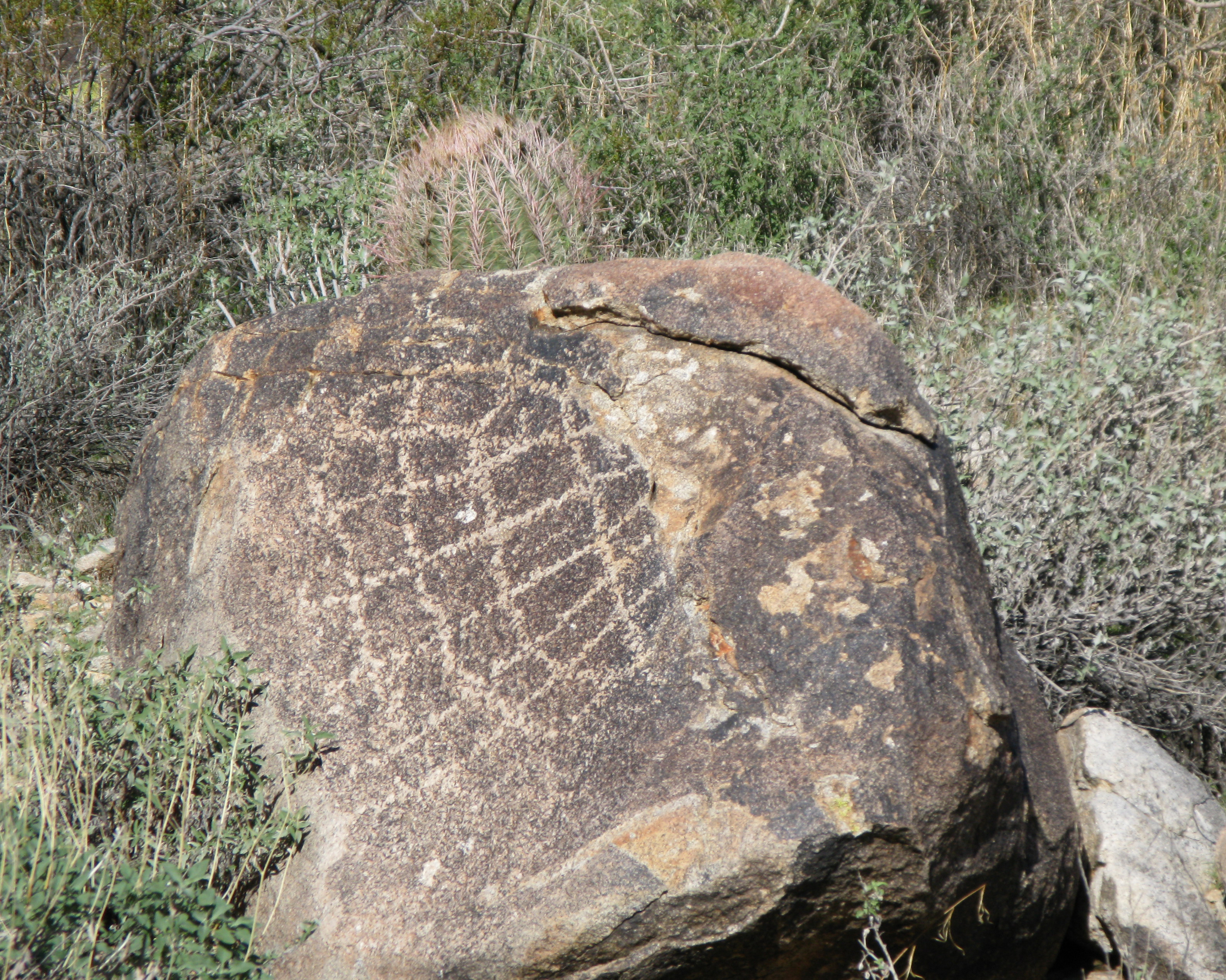
Web-like petroglyph on the White Tank Mountain Regional Park Waterfall Trail, Arizona

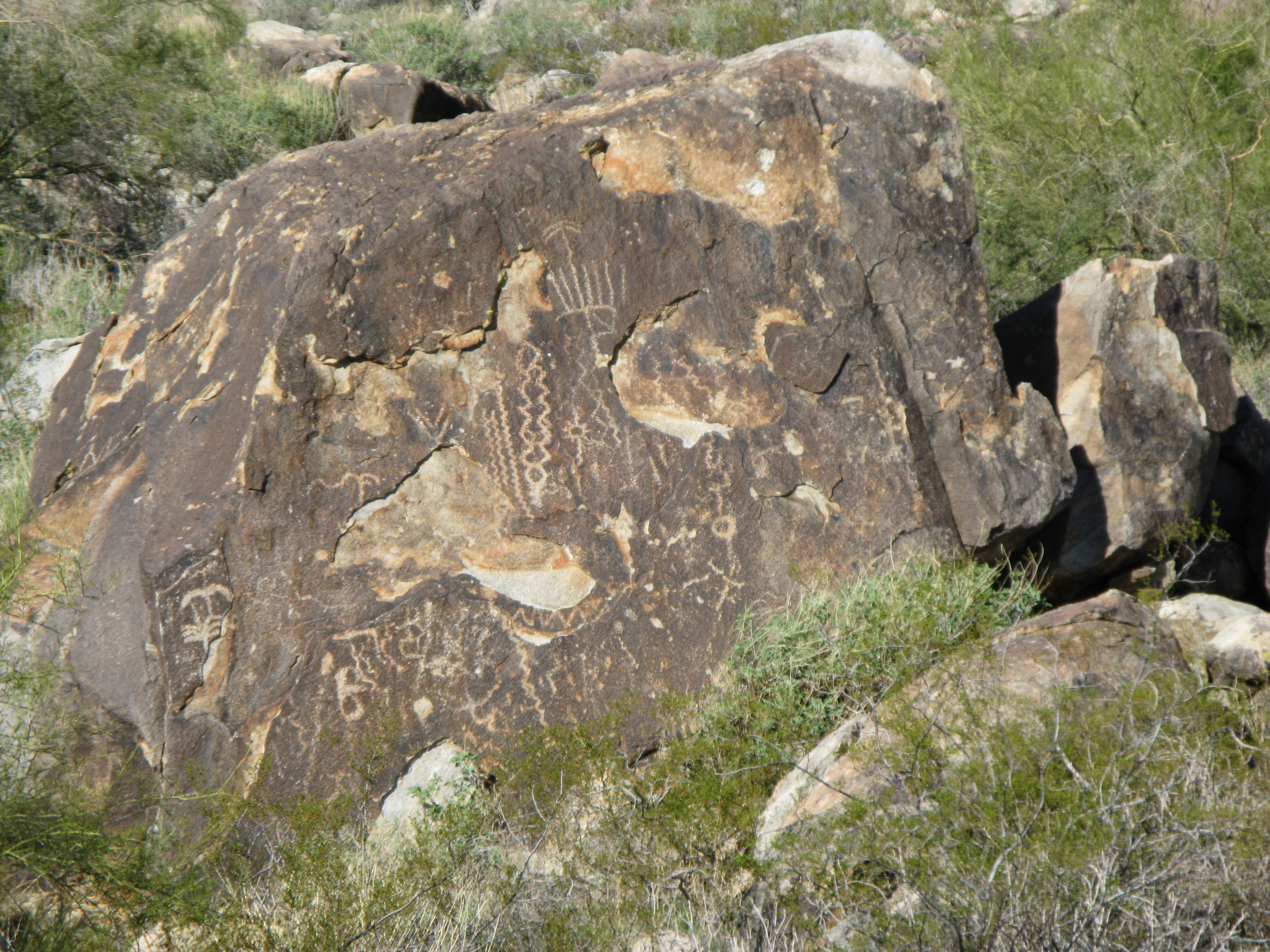
Chipping petroglyph on the White Tank Mountain Regional Park Waterfall Trail, Arizona

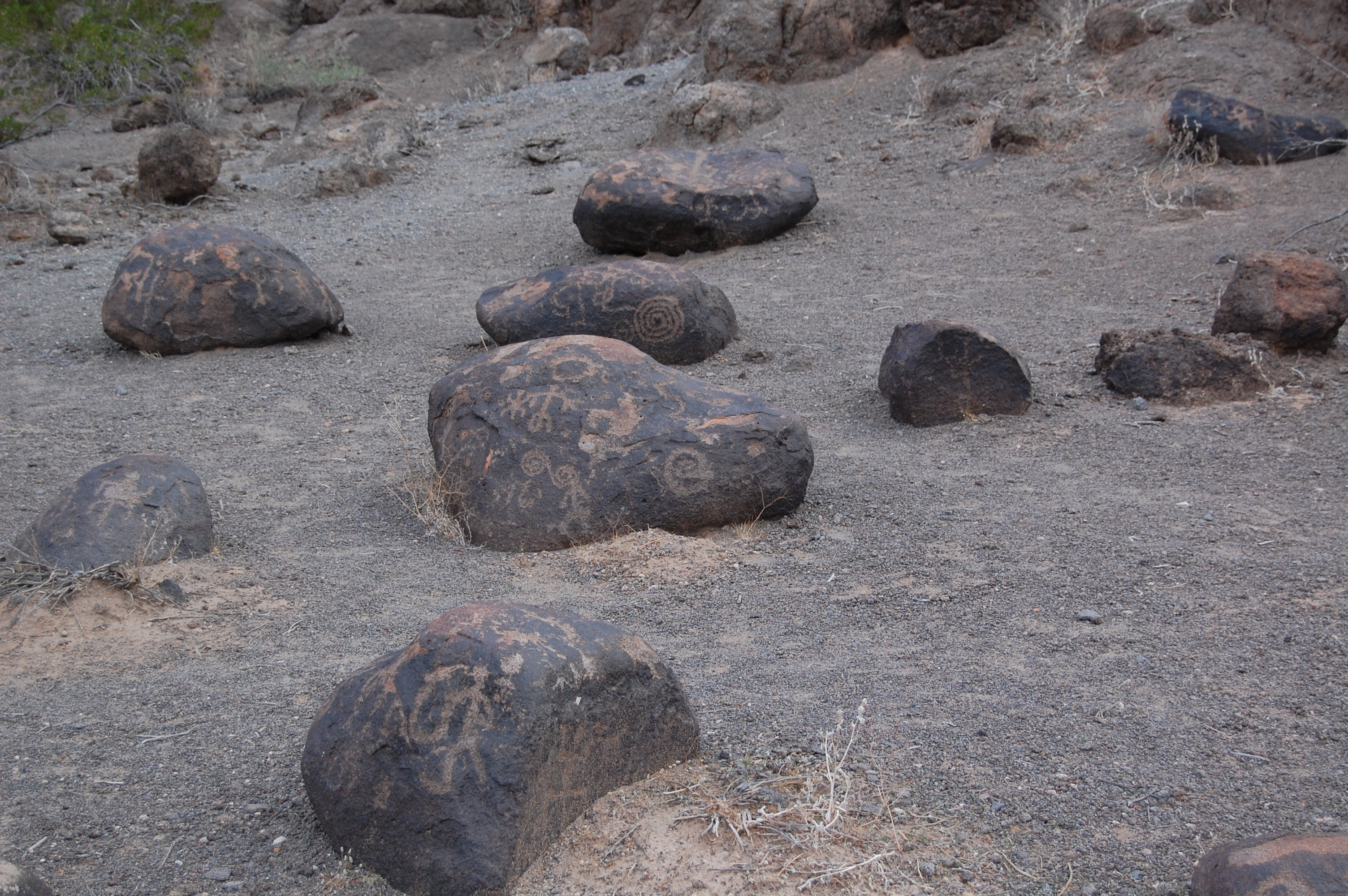
Sample of petroglyphs at Painted Rock near Gila Bend, Arizona off Interstate 8.

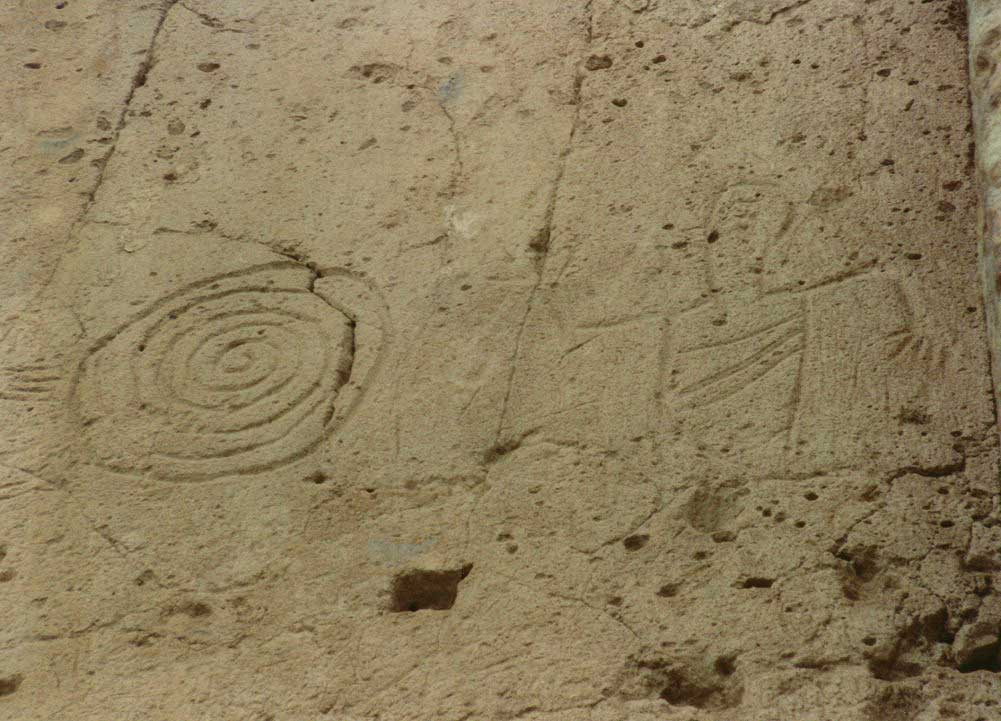
Puye Cliff Dwellings, New Mexico

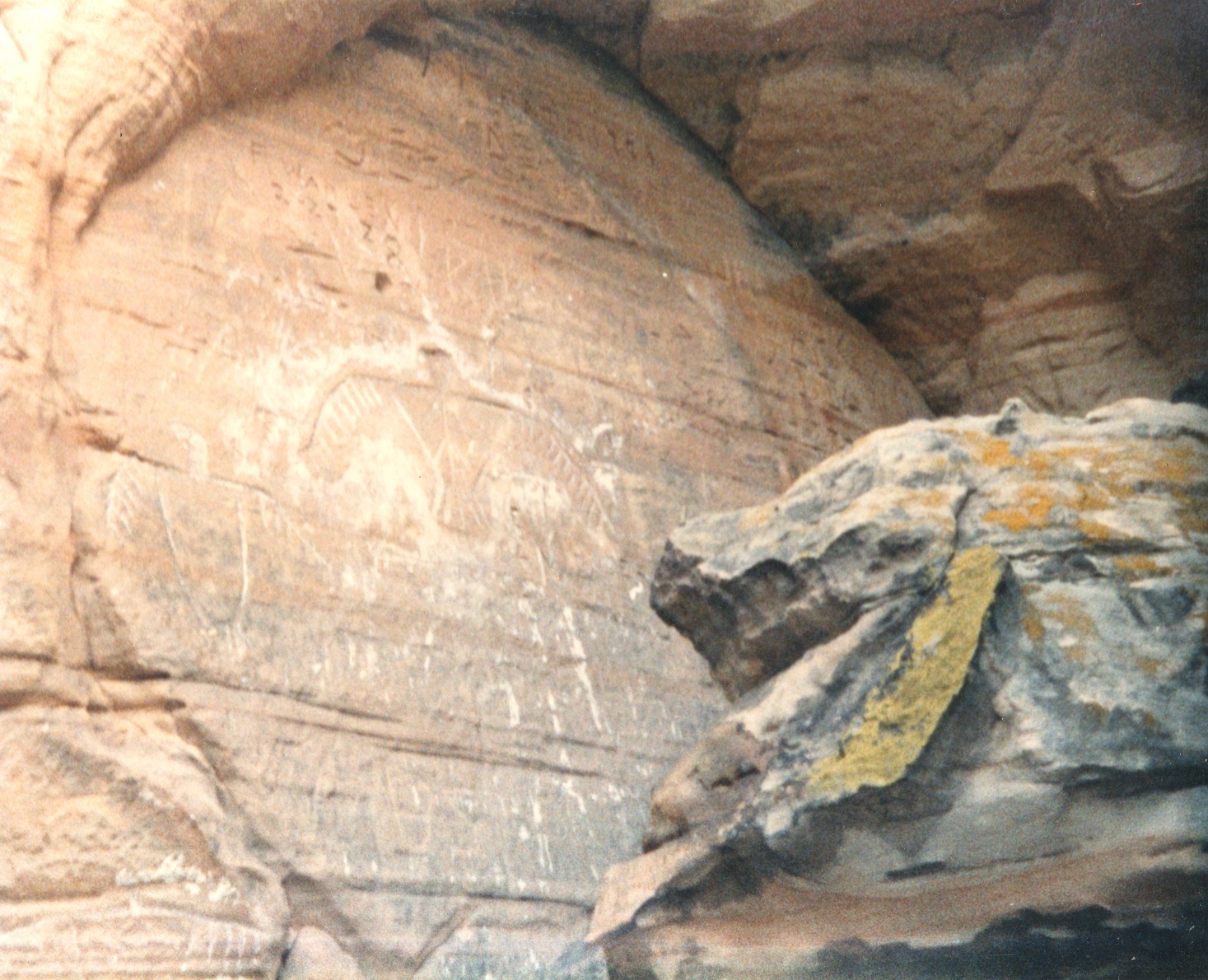
ThunderBird Rock Carved Petroglyph in West Central Wisconsin

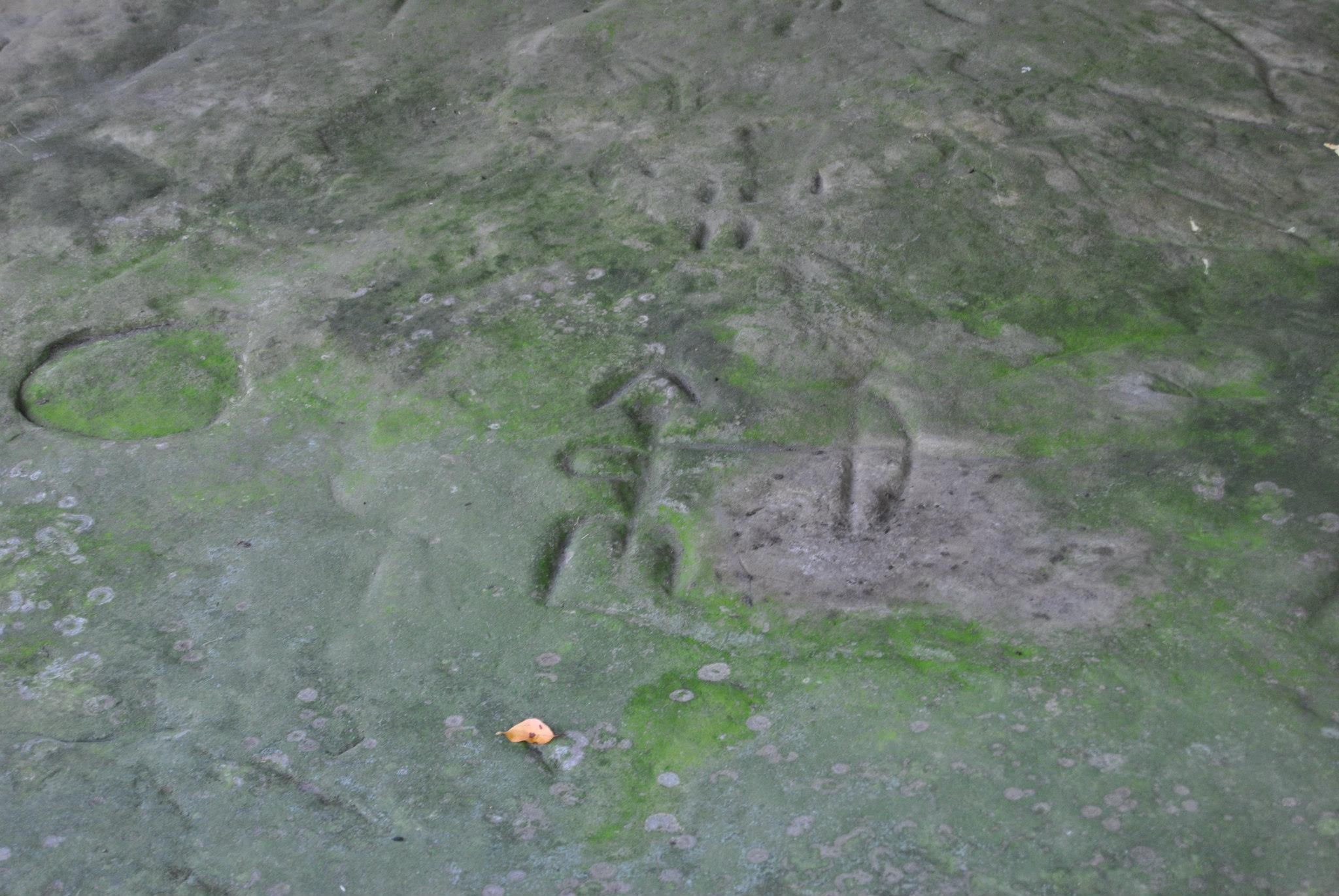
Archer-like figure, Sanilac Petroglyphs Historic State Park, Sanilac County, Michigan

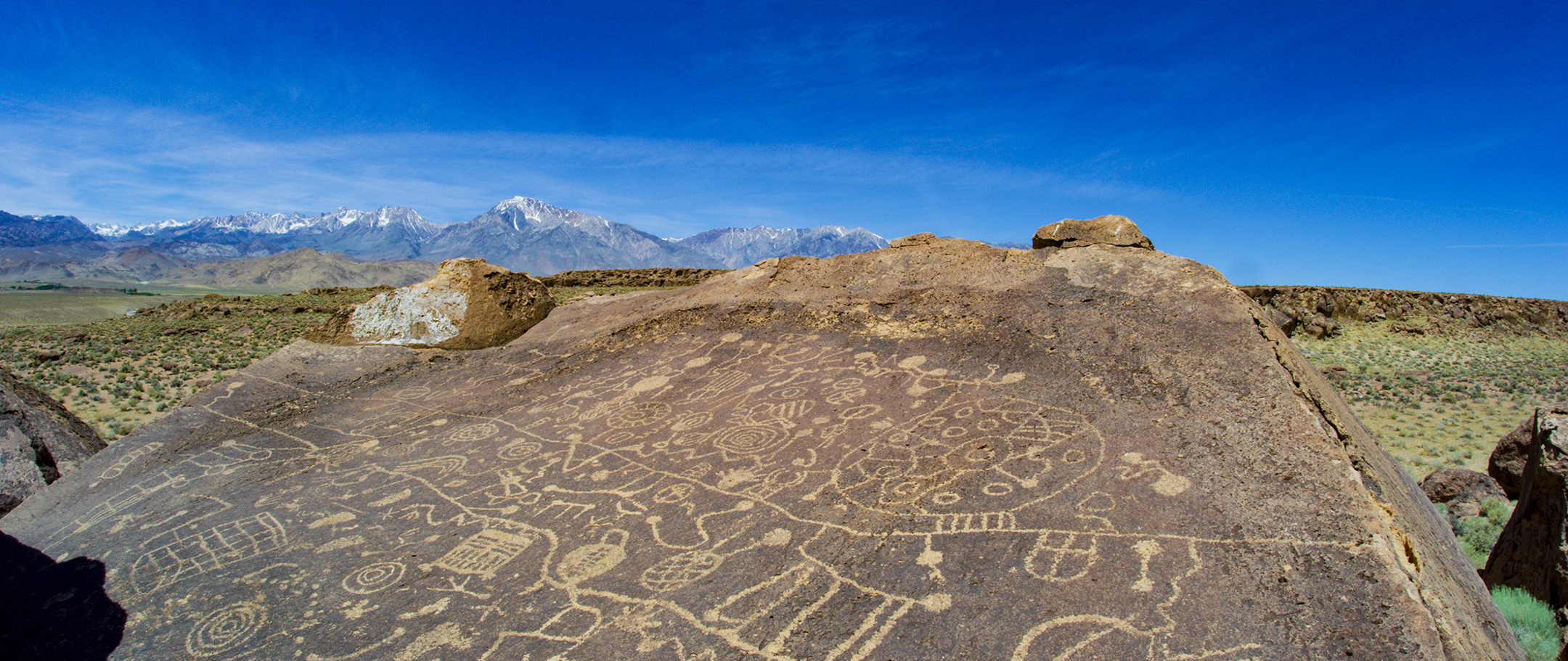
Sky Rock Petroglyphs, Bishop, California.

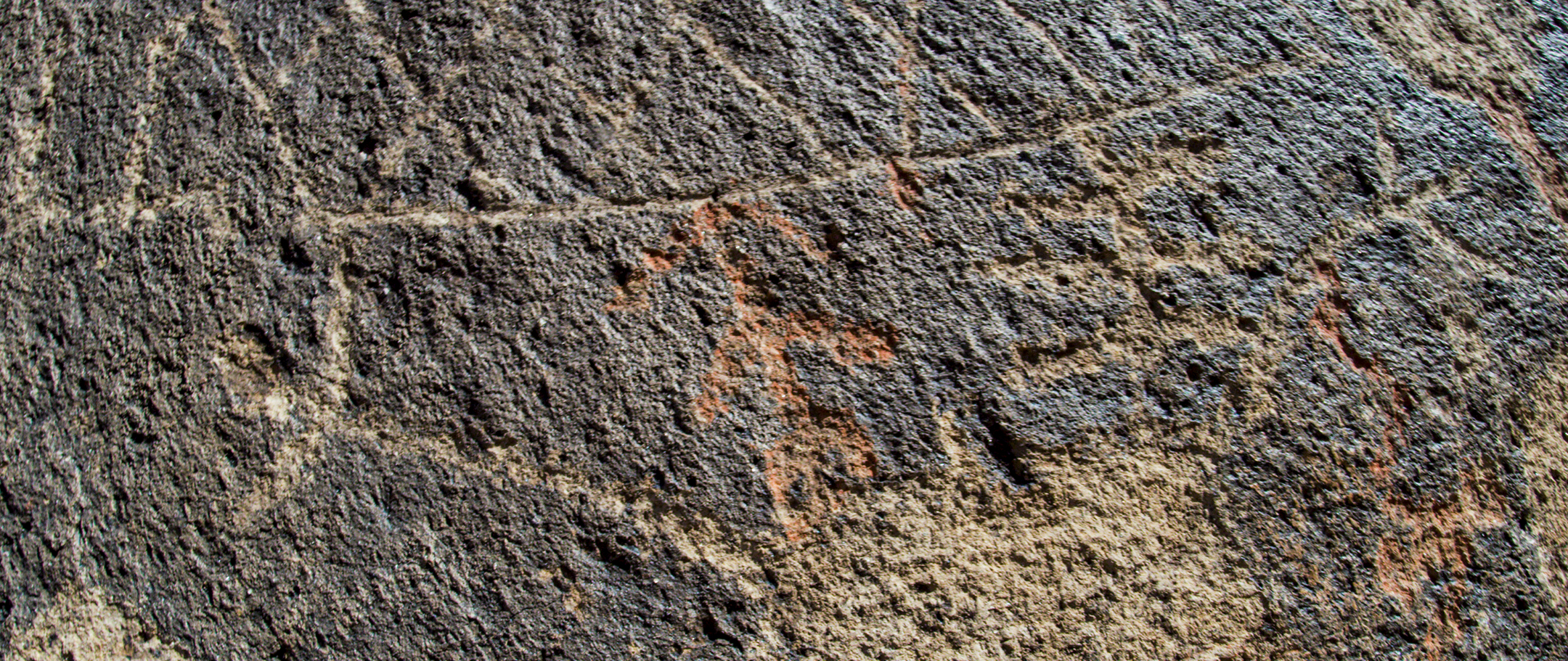
Sky Rock Petroglyphs, Bishop, California.

== Oceania ==
=== Australia ===
- Murujuga, Western Australia – World Heritage Site, July 2025
- Arnhem Land / Kakadu National Park, Northern Australia
- Kings Canyon / Watarrka National Park, Northern Australia
- Sydney rock engravings, New South Wales
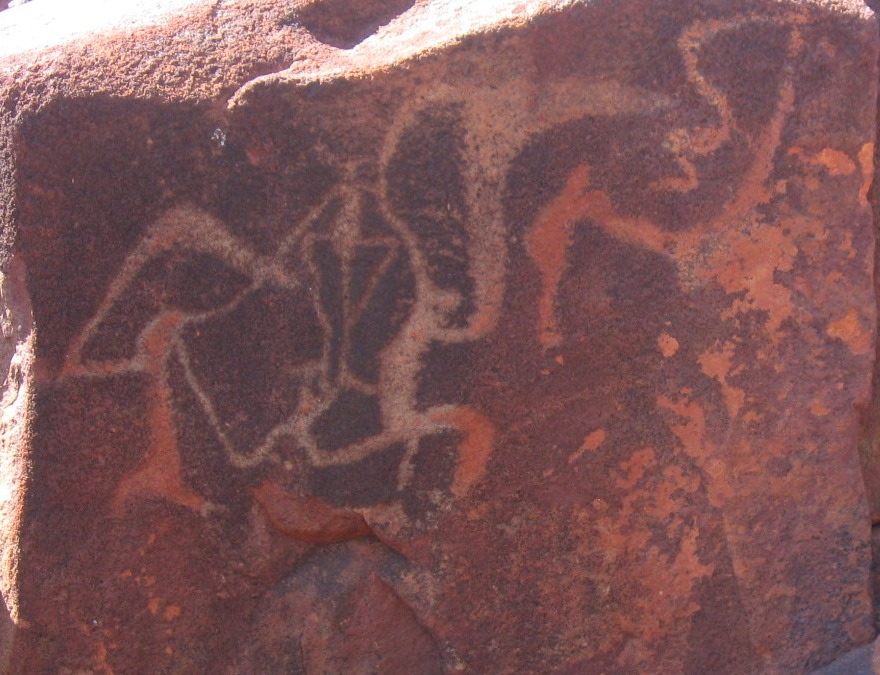
Murujuga, Western Australia

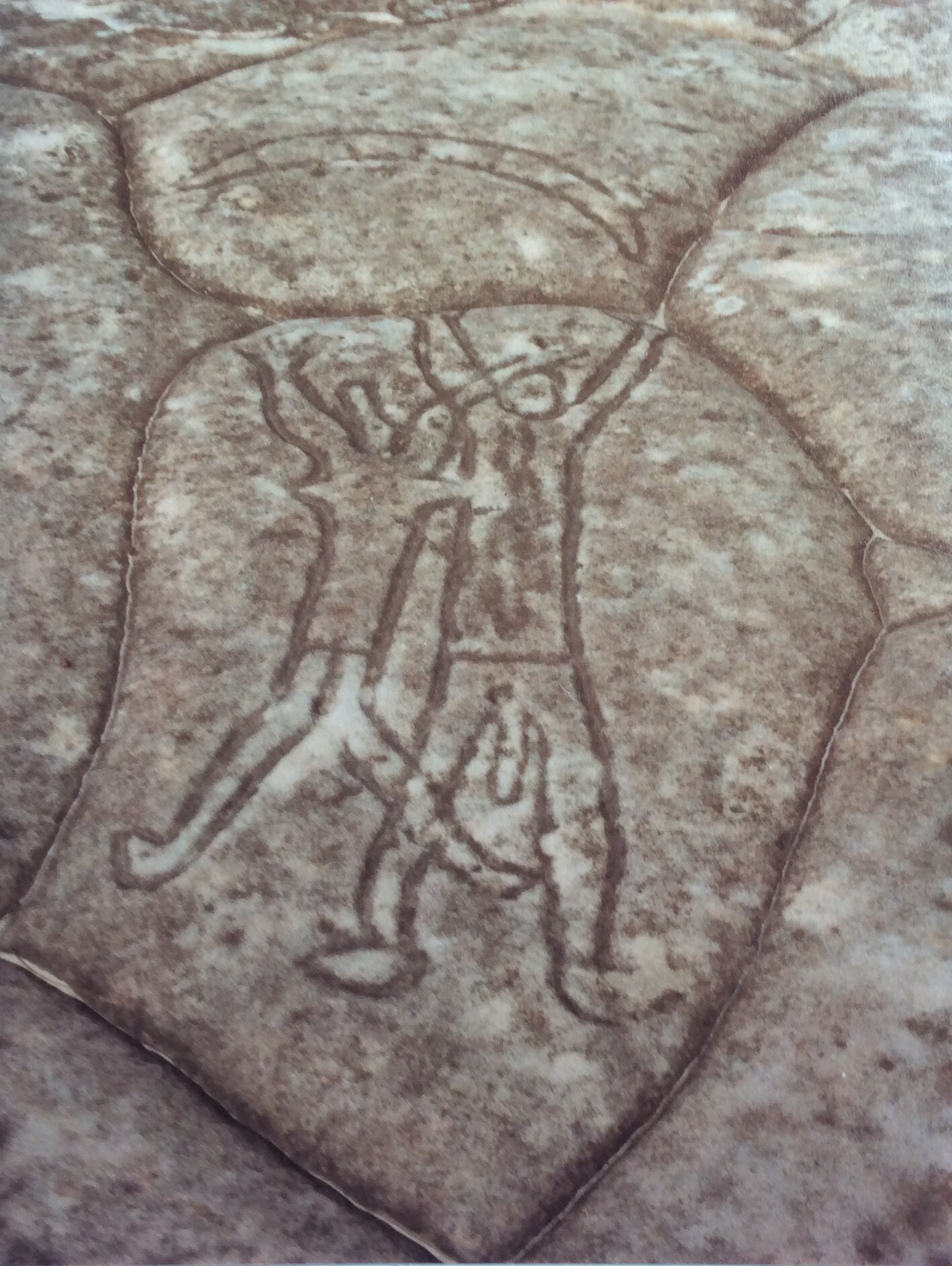
Ku-ring-gai Chase National Park, New South Wales

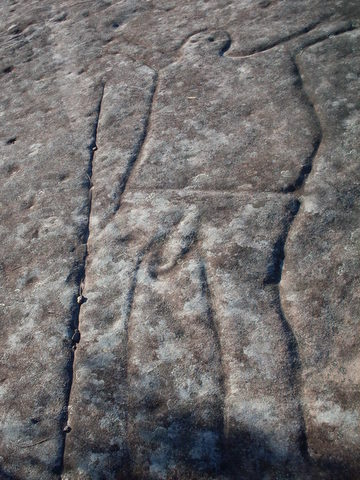
Ku-ring-gai Chase National Park, New South Wales

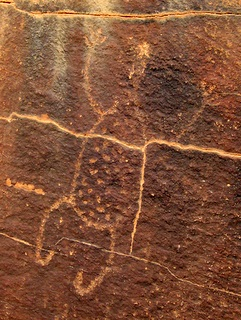
Mutawintji National Park, New South Wales
