= Kiana (singer) =

Musical artist (born 2007)

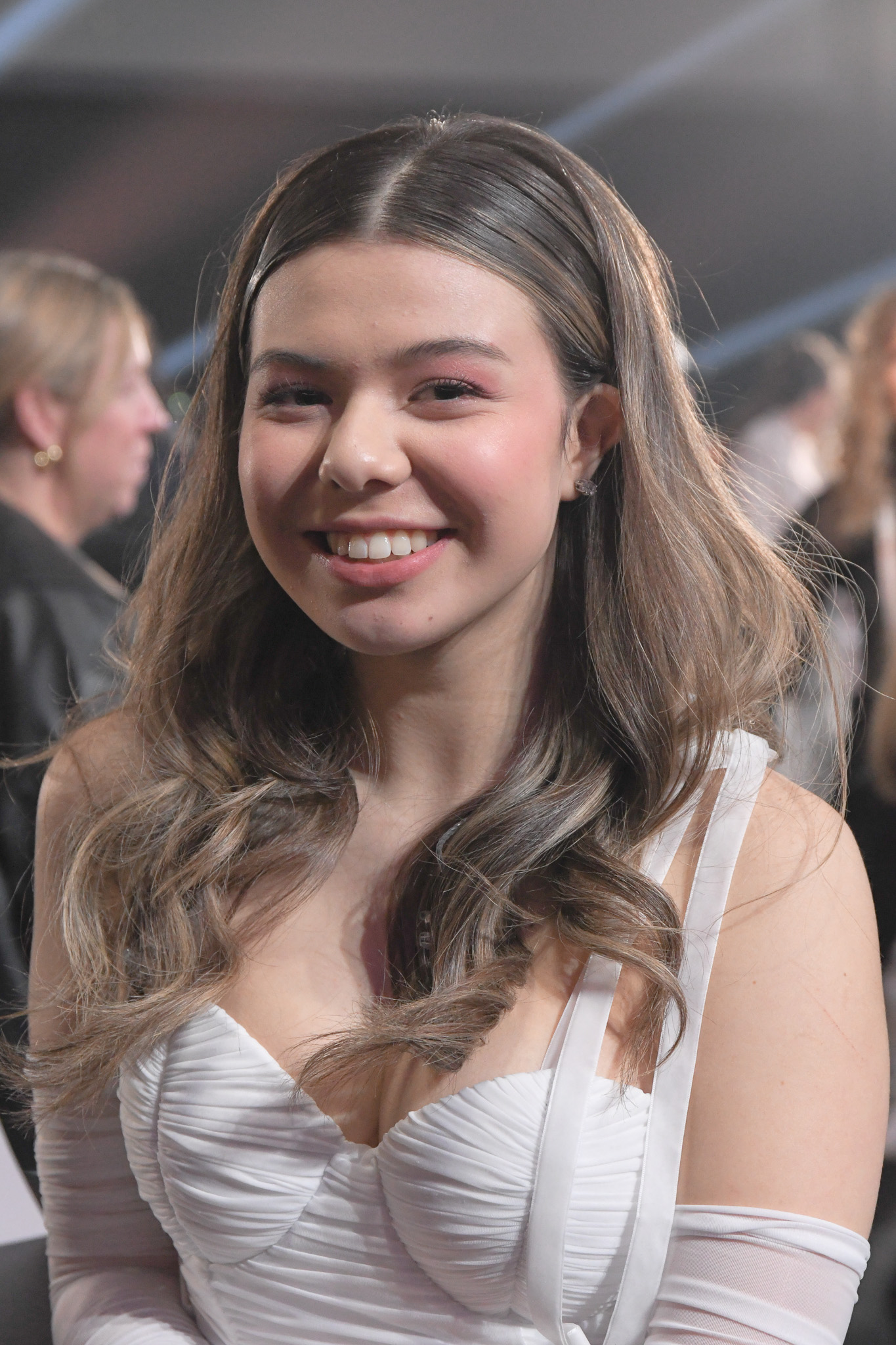
- Kiana in 2023

Background information
- Born: Kiana Jade Blanckert; 25 February 2007 (age 19); Perth, Australia
- Occupation: Singer

Kiana Jade Blanckert (born 25 February 2007) is an Australian-Swedish singer. She participated in Talang 2021, where she placed second in the final. Kiana participated in Melodifestivalen 2023 with the song "Where Did You Go".

== Personal life ==
Kiana was born in Perth, Australia where her mother was raised. Kiana relocated to Sweden when she was two years old. She is a dual citizen of Australia and Sweden.

== Discography ==
=== Singles ===
Title	Year	Peak chart positions	Album
Title	Year	SWE	Album
"Where Did You Go"	2023	11	Non-album single
