= Six Feet Under (Smash Into Pieces song) =

Single by Smash Into Pieces
- Released: 25 February 2023
- Length: 2:59
- Songwriter(s): Andreas "Giri" Lindbergh; Benjamin Jennebo; Chris Adam; Jimmy "Joker" Thörnfeldt; Joy Deb; Linnea Deb; Per Bergquist

Smash Into Pieces singles chronology
"Sleepwalking" (2022)	"Six Feet Under" (2023)	"The Tide" (2023)

"Six Feet Under" is a song by Swedish rock band Smash Into Pieces, released as a single on 25 February 2023. It was performed in Melodifestivalen 2023.

== Charts ==
=== Weekly charts ===
Weekly chart performance for "Six Feet Under"
Chart (2023)	Peak position
Sweden (Sverigetopplistan)	2

=== Year-end charts ===
Year-end chart performance for "Six Feet Under"
Chart (2023)	Position
Sweden (Sverigetopplistan)	31

== Certifications ==
Certifications for "Six Feet Under"
Region	Certification	Certified units/sales
Streaming
Sweden (GLF)	2× Platinum	24,000,000^{†}
^{†} Streaming-only figures based on certification alone.
