= Where Did You Go (Kiana song) =

Single by Kiana
- Released: 25 February 2023
- Length: 2:51
- Label: Universal Music
- Songwriters: Jimmy "Joker" Thörnfeldt; Joy Deb; Linnea Deb
- Producers: Jimmy Joker; Joy Deb

"Where Did You Go" is a song by Australian-Swedish singer Kiana, released as a single on 25 February 2023. It was performed in Melodifestivalen 2023.

== Charts ==
Chart performance for "Where Did You Go"
Chart (2023)	Peak position
Sweden (Sverigetopplistan)	11
