= Tennessee Tears =

Swedish country music duo

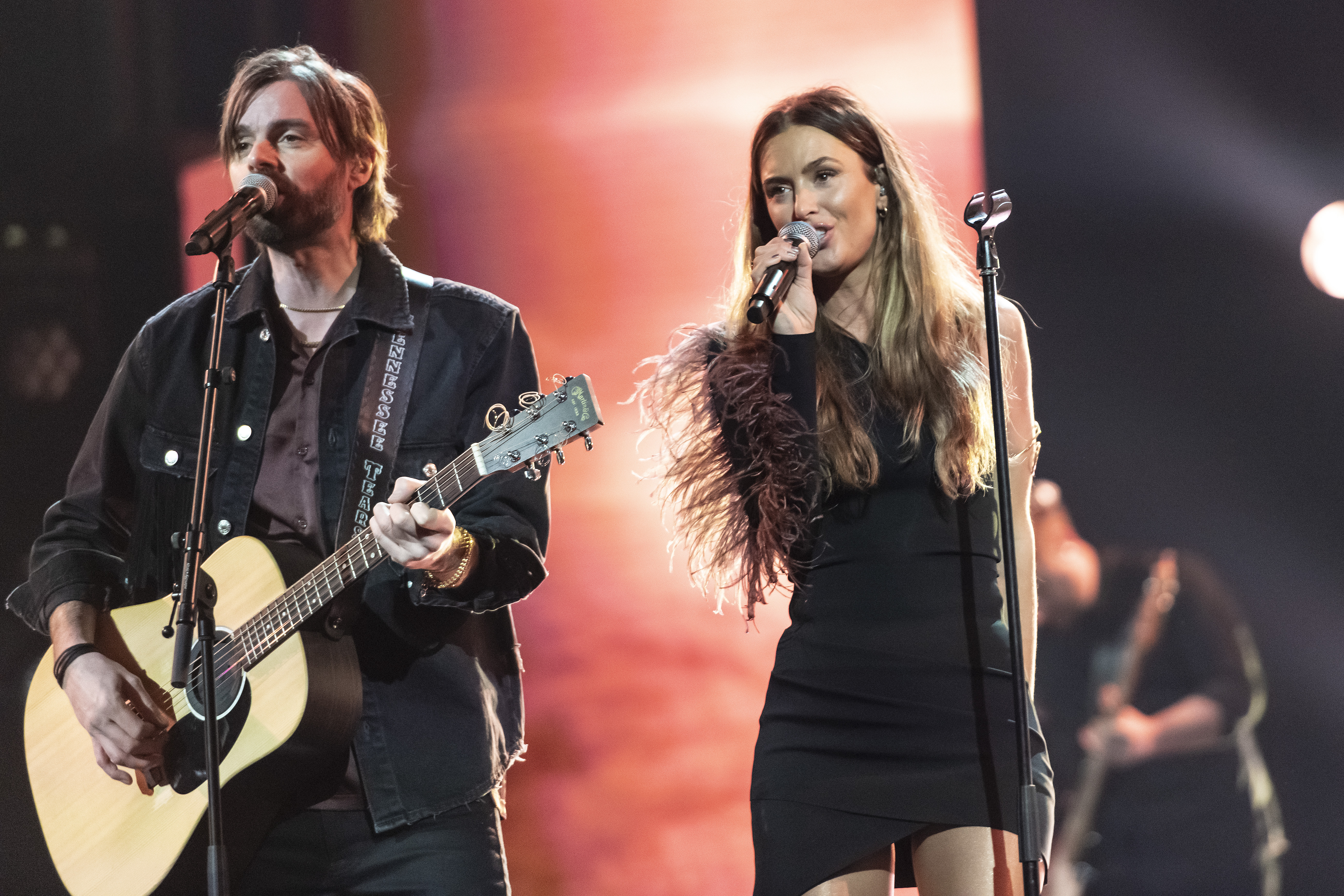
- Tennessee Tears in 2023

Background information
- Origin: Åseda, Sweden
- Genres: Country; country pop
- Years active: 2014-
- Labels: Jimajomo Land
- Members: Tilda Feuk; Jonas Hermansson

Tennessee Tears are a Swedish country music duo consisting of Tilda Feuk and Jonas Hermansson. They participated in Melodifestivalen 2023 with the song "Now I Know".

== Discography ==
=== Singles ===
Title	Year	Peak chart positions	Album
Title	Year	SWE	Album
"Now I Know"	2023	63	Non-album singles
"Yours"	2025	42	Non-album singles
