= Släpp alla sorger =

Single by Nordman
- Released: 18 February 2023
- Length: 3:03
- Label: Wester Produktion
- Songwriter(s): Jimmy Jansson; Thomas G:son
- Producer(s): Jimmy Jansson; Thomas G:son

Nordman singles chronology
"Vi kan vinna" (2022)	"Släpp alla sorger" (2023)

"Släpp alla sorger" is a song by Swedish duo Nordman, released as a single on 18 February 2023. It was performed in Melodifestivalen 2023.

== Charts ==
=== Weekly charts ===
Weekly chart performance for "Släpp alla sorger"
Chart (2023)	Peak position
Sweden (Sverigetopplistan)	7

=== Year-end charts ===
Year-end chart performance for "Släpp alla sorger"
Chart (2023)	Position
Sweden (Sverigetopplistan)	83
