= Melodifestivalen 2023 =

Swedish music competition

Dates and venue
- Heat 1: 4 February 2023
- Heat 2: 11 February 2023
- Heat 3: 18 February 2023
- Heat 4: 25 February 2023
- Semi-final: 4 March 2023
- Final: 11 March 2023

Production
- Broadcaster: Sveriges Television (SVT)
- Director: Fredrik Bäcklund; Robin Hofwander
- Artistic director: Karin Gunnarsson
- Presenters: Farah Abadi; Jesper Rönndahl

Participants
- Number of entries: 28
- Number of finalists: 12

Vote
- Voting system: Heats and semi-final: 100% public vote Final: 50% public vote, 50% jury vote
- Winning song: "Tattoo" by Loreen

Melodifestivalen 2023 was the 63rd edition of the Swedish music competition Melodifestivalen, which was organised by Sveriges Television (SVT) and took place over a six-week period between 4 February and 11 March 2023. The winner of the competition was Loreen with the song "Tattoo", who went on to win the Eurovision Song Contest 2023 for Sweden. All shows were hosted by Farah Abadi and Jesper Rönndahl.

== Format ==
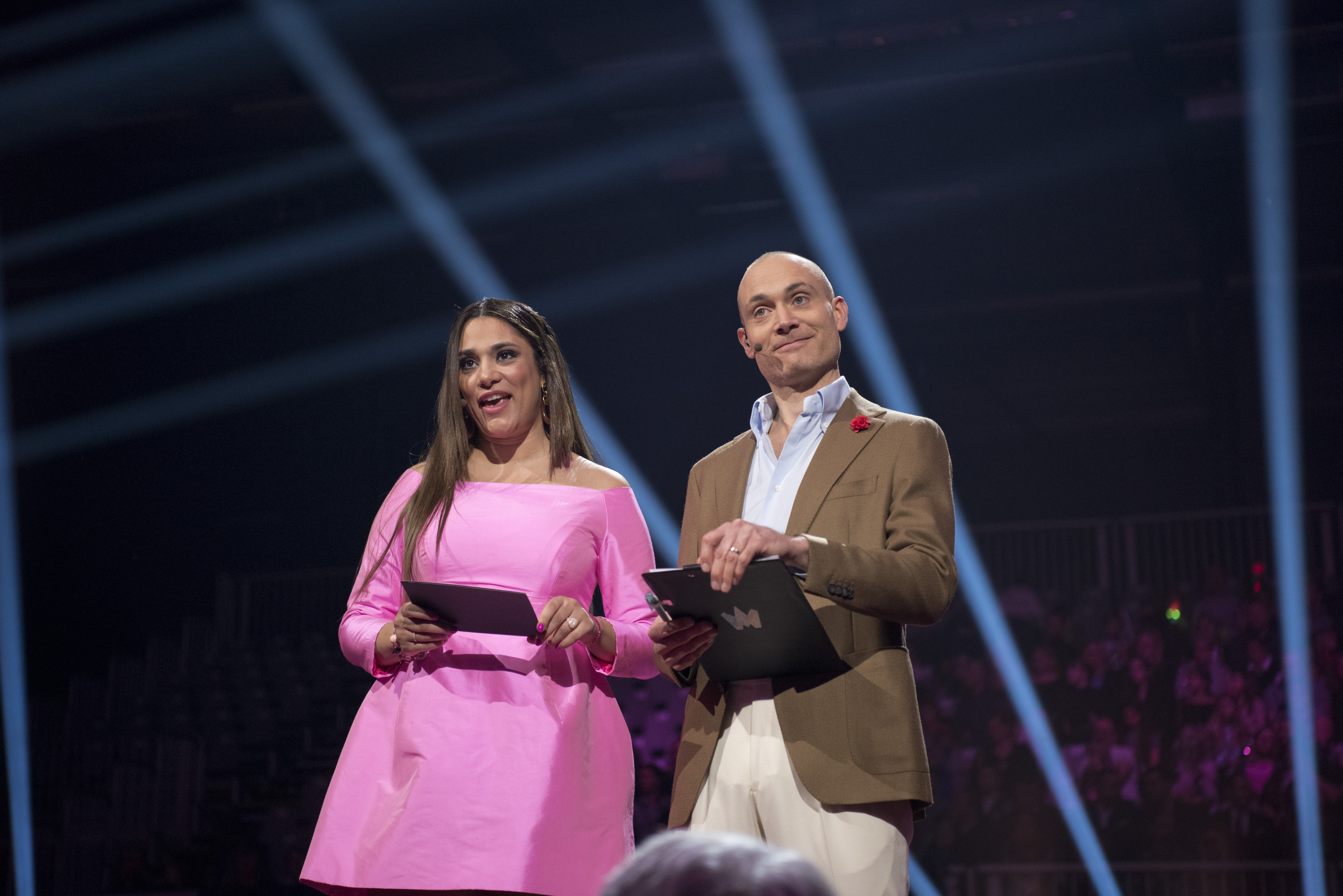
Farah Abadi and Jesper Rönndahl, presenters of Melodifestivalen 2023.

After the cancellation of the traditional tour around six cities of the country (namely Malmö, Gothenburg, Linköping, Lidköping, Örnsköldsvik and Stockholm) for the previous edition due to the COVID-19 Omicron variant, SVT subsequently announced that the six cities would host the tour in 2023 instead, with new dates. As usual, a total of 28 entries took part in the competition, 12 of which progressed to the final. Farah Abadi and Jesper Rönndahl were revealed as the presenters of Melodifestivalen 2023 on 24 September 2022.

Proceeds from the voting were, like in the last three shows of the previous edition, donated to aid relief efforts during the Russian invasion of Ukraine. Starting from the second heat, proceeds were also donated to aid relief efforts in the aftermath of the 2023 Turkey–Syria earthquakes.

Competition schedule
Show	Date	City	Venue
Heat 1	4 February 2023	Gothenburg	Scandinavium
Heat 2	11 February 2023	Linköping	Saab Arena
Heat 3	18 February 2023	Lidköping	Sparbanken Lidköping Arena
Heat 4	25 February 2023	Malmö	Malmö Arena
Semi-final	4 March 2023	Örnsköldsvik	Hägglunds Arena
Final	11 March 2023	Stockholm	Friends Arena

=== Semi-final format changes ===
Changes to the format of the semi-final show were announced on 23 November 2022. As opposed to the third- and fourth-placed songs from each of the previous four heats (eight songs in total) being allotted into two separate semi-finals in the previous edition, all of those songs now compete against each other in a single semi-final, with the top four songs advancing to the final, similar to the preceding heats. Viewers are presented with the preliminary top four songs (in a random order) midway through the voting window, and are then provided with new votes in order to continue influencing the result. After the window is closed, the full breakdown of the results, including points given out by each age group, is shown on screen.

== Competing entries ==
On 26 August 2022, SVT opened a public submission window (with the deadline on 16 September 2022) to select one half of the contestants, the other half being made up of artists specially invited by the broadcaster. Upon closing the submission period, SVT announced that over 2,800 applications had been received, to be reviewed by a professional jury chaired by producer Karin Gunnarsson.

The first half of contestants were officially announced by SVT on 29 November 2022, while the second half was revealed on the following 30 November. Several participants had previously competed at Melodifestivalen: Axel Schylström (2017), Eva Rydberg & Ewa Roos (2021), Jon Henrik Fjällgren (2015, 2017, and 2019), Loreen (2011, 2017, and winner in 2012), Loulou Lamotte (2021, and winner in 2020, both as part of The Mamas), Mariette (2015, 2017, 2018, and 2020), duo Nordman (2005 and 2008), band Panetoz (2014 and 2016), Paul Rey (2020 and 2021), Theoz (2022), Tone Sekelius (2022), Victor Crone (2015 and 2020) and Wiktoria (2016, 2017, and 2019).

Artist	Song	Songwriter(s)
Axel Schylström	"Gorgeous"	Axel Schylström, Herman Gardarfve, Jonas Thander, Malin Halvardsson
Casanovas	"Så kommer känslorna tillbaka"	Henrik Sethsson, Mikael Karlsson
Eden	"Comfortable"	Benjamin Rosenbohm, Eden Alm, Emil Adler Lei, Julie Aagaard
Elov & Beny	"Raggen går"	Johan Werner, Kristian Wejshag, Mattias Elovsson, Oscar Kilenius, Tim Larsson
Emil Henrohn	"Mera mera mera"	Emil Henrohn, Jakob Redtzer, Ji Nilsson, Marlene Strand
Eva Rydberg & Ewa Roos	"Länge leve livet"	Emil Vaker, Henric Pierroff, Kalle Rydberg
Ida-Lova	"Låt hela stan se på"	Andreas "Giri" Lindbergh, Ida-Lova Lind, Joy Deb, Linnea Deb
Jon Henrik Fjällgren, Arc North feat. Adam Woods	"Where You Are (Sávežan)"	Calle Hellberg, Jon Henrik Fjällgren, Joy Deb, Oliver Belvelin, Oscar Christiansson, Richard Lästh, Tobias Lundgren, William Segerdahl
Kiana	"Where Did You Go"	Jimmy "Joker" Thörnfeldt, Joy Deb, Linnea Deb
Laurell	"Sober"	Anderz Wrethov, Andreas Johansson, Laurell Barker, Thomas Stengaard
Loreen	"Tattoo"	Jimmy "Joker" Thörnfeldt, Jimmy Jansson, Lorine Talhaoui, Moa Carlebecker, Peter Boström, Thomas G:son
Loulou Lamotte	"Inga sorger"	Jonas Thander, Loulou Lamotte
Marcus & Martinus	"Air"	Jimmy "Joker" Thörnfeldt, Joy Deb, Linnea Deb, Marcus Gunnarsen, Martinus Gunnarsen
Maria Sur	"Never Give Up"	Anderz Wrethov, Laurell Barker
Mariette	"One Day"	Jimmy Jansson, Thomas G:son, Mariette Hansson
Melanie Wehbe	"For the Show"	David Lindgren Zacharias, Herman Gardarfve, Melanie Wehbe
Nordman	"Släpp alla sorger"	Jimmy Jansson, Thomas G:son
Panetoz	"On My Way"	Anders Wigelius, Daniel Nzinga, Jimmy Jansson, Nebeyu Baheru, Njol Badjie, Pa Modou Badjie, Robert Norberg
Paul Rey	"Royals"	Dino Medanhodzic, Jimmy "Joker" Thörnfeldt, Liam Cacatian Thomassen, Paul Rey
Rejhan	"Haunted"	Albin Johnsén, Mattias Andréasson, Pontus Söderman, Tilde "Ronia" Wrigsell
Signe & Hjördis	"Edelweiss"	Anderz Wrethov, Jimmy Jansson, Myra Granberg
Smash Into Pieces	"Six Feet Under"	Andreas "Giri" Lindbergh, Benjamin Jennebo, Chris Adam, Jimmy "Joker" Thörnfeldt, Joy Deb, Linnea Deb, Per Bergquist
Tennessee Tears	"Now I Know"	Anderz Wrethov, Jonas Hermansson, Thomas Stengaard, Tilda Feuk
Theoz	"Mer av dig"	Axel Schylström, Jakob Redtzer, Peter Boström, Thomas G:son
Tone Sekelius	"Rhythm of My Show"	Anderz Wrethov, Dino Medanhodzic, Jimmy "Joker" Thörnfeldt, Tone Sekelius
Uje Brandelius	"Grytan"	Uje Brandelius
Victor Crone	"Diamonds"	David Lindgren Zacharias, Peter Kvint, Victor Crone
Wiktoria	"All My Life (Where Have You Been)"	Herman Gardarfve, Melanie Wehbe, Patrik Jean, Wiktoria Johansson

== Contest overview ==
=== Heats ===
==== Heat 1 ====
The first heat took place on 4 February 2023 in Scandinavium, Gothenburg. 2,912,000 viewers watched the heat live. A total of 9,852,321 votes were cast, using 525,532 devices.

R/O	Artist	Song	Round 1		Round 2			Result
R/O	Artist	Song	Votes	Place	Votes	Points	Place	Result
1	Tone Sekelius	"Rhythm of My Show"	1,087,127	2	803,948	94	1	Final
2	Loulou Lamotte	"Inga sorger"	754,498	7	363,254	32	5	Out
3	Rejhan	"Haunted"	884,660	4	460,003	32	4	Out
4	Elov & Beny	"Raggen går"	821,418	5	467,605	43	3	Semi‑final
5	Victor Crone	"Diamonds"	1,012,655	3	625,862	80	2	Semi‑final
6	Eva Rydberg & Ewa Roos	"Länge leve livet"	788,433	6	430,366	31	6	Out
7	Jon Henrik Fjällgren, Arc North feat. Adam Woods	"Where You Are (Sávežan)"	1,352,492	1	—			Final

Round 2 detailed televoting results
R/O	Song	Age groups							Tel.
R/O	Song	3‍–‍9	10‍–‍15	16‍–‍29	30‍–‍44	45‍–‍59	60‍–‍74	75+	Tel.
1	"Rhythm of My Show"	12	12	12	12	12	12	10	12
2	"Inga sorger"	1	1	1	5	8	8	5	3
3	"Haunted"	5	8	10	3	3	1	1	1
4	"Raggen går"	8	3	3	8	5	5	3	8
5	"Diamonds"	10	10	8	10	10	10	12	10
6	"Länge leve livet"	3	5	5	1	1	3	8	5

==== Heat 2 ====
The second heat took place on 11 February 2023 in Saab Arena, Linköping. 2,830,000 viewers watched the heat live. A total of 10,108,443 votes were cast, using 527,368 devices.

R/O	Artist	Song	Round 1		Round 2			Result
R/O	Artist	Song	Votes	Place	Votes	Points	Place	Result
1	Wiktoria	"All My Life (Where Have You Been)"	1,057,852	4	520,646	47	4	Out
2	Eden	"Comfortable"	608,948	6	218,298	12	6	Out
3	Uje Brandelius	"Grytan"	585,684	7	277,599	22	5	Out
4	Panetoz	"On My Way"	1,333,786	2	784,687	84	1	Final
5	Tennessee Tears	"Now I Know"	1,001,348	5	500,652	69	3	Semi-final
6	Maria Sur	"Never Give Up"	1,346,229	1	—			Final
7	Theoz	"Mer av dig"	1,106,875	3	765,979	78	2	Semi-final

Round 2 detailed televoting results
R/O	Song	Age groups							Tel.
R/O	Song	3‍–‍9	10‍–‍15	16‍–‍29	30‍–‍44	45‍–‍59	60‍–‍74	75+	Tel.
1	"All My Life (Where Have You Been)"	8	8	8	5	5	5	5	3
2	"Comfortable"	3	3	1	1	1	1	1	1
3	"Grytan"	1	1	3	3	3	3	3	5
4	"On My Way"	10	12	12	10	12	10	10	8
5	"Now I Know"	5	5	5	8	10	12	12	12
7	"Mer av dig"	12	10	10	12	8	8	8	10

==== Heat 3 ====
The third heat took place on 18 February 2023 in Sparbanken Lidköping Arena, Lidköping. 2,598,000 viewers watched the heat live. A total of 9,522,729 votes were cast, using 512,158 devices.

R/O	Artist	Song	Round 1		Round 2			Result
R/O	Artist	Song	Votes	Place	Votes	Points	Place	Result
1	Paul Rey	"Royals"	1,151,609	2	693,857	85	1	Final
2	Casanovas	"Så kommer känslorna tillbaka"	647,419	7	290,521	29	6	Out
3	Melanie Wehbe	"For the Show"	903,976	4	477,315	57	3	Semi-final
4	Nordman	"Släpp alla sorger"	975,890	3	589,916	75	2	Semi-final
5	Laurell	"Sober"	750,918	6	391,744	30	5	Out
6	Ida-Lova	"Låt hela stan se på"	792,432	5	450,391	36	4	Out
7	Marcus & Martinus	"Air"	1,406,471	1	—N/a			Final

Round 2 detailed televoting results
R/O	Song	Age groups							Tel.
R/O	Song	3‍–‍9	10‍–‍15	16‍–‍29	30‍–‍44	45‍–‍59	60‍–‍74	75+	Tel.
1	"Royals"	12	12	12	12	12	10	12	3
2	"Så kommer känslorna tillbaka"	1	1	3	1	3	5	5	10
3	"For the Show"	5	10	5	8	8	8	8	5
4	"Släpp alla sorger"	8	3	10	10	10	12	10	12
5	"Sober"	10	8	1	5	1	3	1	1
6	"Låt hela stan se på"	3	5	8	3	5	1	3	8

==== Heat 4 ====
The fourth heat took place on 25 February 2023 in Malmö Arena, Malmö. 2,814,000 viewers watched the heat live. A total of 9,932,645 votes were cast, using 542,205 devices. Loreen restarted her performance due to an environmental activist invading the stage.

R/O	Artist	Song	Round 1		Round 2			Result
R/O	Artist	Song	Votes	Place	Votes	Points	Place	Result
1	Kiana	"Where Did You Go"	1,105,369	3	610,462	69	2	Semi-final
2	Signe & Hjördis	"Edelweiss"	744,902	7	328,700	27	5	Out
3	Smash Into Pieces	"Six Feet Under"	1,120,307	2	701,606	79	1	Final
4	Mariette	"One Day"	835,533	5	482,713	56	3	Semi-final
5	Emil Henrohn	"Mera mera mera"	760,793	6	382,224	26	6	Out
6	Axel Schylström	"Gorgeous"	861,688	4	483,061	55	4	Out
7	Loreen	"Tattoo"	1,515,287	1	—N/a			Final

Round 2 detailed televoting results
R/O	Song	Age groups							Tel.
R/O	Song	3‍–‍9	10‍–‍15	16‍–‍29	30‍–‍44	45‍–‍59	60‍–‍74	75+	Tel.
1	"Where Did You Go"	12	12	10	10	5	5	10	5
2	"Edelweiss"	5	1	1	3	3	3	8	3
3	"Six Feet Under"	10	8	12	12	12	10	3	12
4	"One Day"	1	3	5	5	10	12	12	8
5	"Mera mera mera"	8	10	3	1	1	1	1	1
6	"Gorgeous"	3	5	8	8	8	8	5	10

=== Semi-final ===
The semi-final took place on 4 March 2023 in Hägglunds Arena, Örnsköldsvik. 2,315,000 viewers watched the semi-final live. A total of 12,078,625 votes were cast (which is a record for a Second Chance round), using 541,460 devices.

R/O	Artist	Song	Votes	Points	Place	Result
1	Theoz	"Mer av dig"	2,104,689	70	2	Final
2	Mariette	"One Day"	1,459,012	63	4	Final
3	Victor Crone	"Diamonds"	1,225,614	28	6	Out
4	Tennessee Tears	"Now I Know"	1,393,108	55	5	Out
5	Elov & Beny	"Raggen går"	1,083,924	18	8	Out
6	Melanie Wehbe	"For the Show"	1,106,724	22	7	Out
7	Nordman	"Släpp alla sorger"	1,798,314	75	1	Final
8	Kiana	"Where Did You Go"	1,907,240	69	3	Final

Detailed televoting results
R/O	Song	Age groups							Tel.
R/O	Song	3‍–‍9	10‍–‍15	16‍–‍29	30‍–‍44	45‍–‍59	60‍–‍74	75+	Tel.
1	"Mer av dig"	12	10	12	12	6	6	6	6
2	"One Day"	2	6	7	6	10	12	12	8
3	"Diamonds"	6	7	2	2	2	4	4	1
4	"Now I Know"	4	2	6	7	8	10	8	10
5	"Raggen går"	7	1	1	4	1	1	1	2
6	"For the Show"	1	4	4	1	4	2	2	4
7	"Släpp alla sorger"	8	8	10	10	12	8	7	12
8	"Where Did You Go"	10	12	8	8	7	7	10	7

=== Final ===
The final took place on 11 March 2023 in Friends Arena, Stockholm, where Loreen won with her song "Tattoo". 3,419,000 viewers watched the final live. A record-breaking total of 23,521,188 votes were cast, using 936,964 devices.

R/O	Artist	Song	Juries	Public	Total	Place
1	Jon Henrik Fjällgren, Arc North feat. Adam Woods	"Where You Are (Sávežan)"	23	58	81	4
2	Tone Sekelius	"Rhythm of My Show"	15	5	20	12
3	Mariette	"One Day"	35	16	51	8
4	Marcus & Martinus	"Air"	71	67	138	2
5	Panetoz	"On My Way"	22	25	47	10
6	Maria Sur	"Never Give Up"	10	37	47	9
7	Smash Into Pieces	"Six Feet Under"	53	59	112	3
8	Kiana	"Where Did You Go"	37	39	76	6
9	Nordman	"Släpp alla sorger"	8	36	44	11
10	Loreen	"Tattoo"	92	85	177	1
11	Theoz	"Mer av dig"	42	36	78	5
12	Paul Rey	"Royals"	56	1	57	7

Detailed international jury votes
R/O	Song	Croatia	Austria	Latvia	Belgium	Malta	Australia	Germany	Spain	Total
R/O	Song	Croatia	Austria	Latvia	Belgium	Malta	Australia	Germany	Spain	Total
1	"Where You Are (Sávežan)"	1	3	1	5	6	4		3	23
2	"Rhythm of My Show"	6	1	3					5	15
3	"One Day"	2	7	7	3	5	2	3	6	35
4	"Air"	7	8	8	10	10	10	10	8	71
5	"On My Way"	5	2	2	4	4	1	4		22
6	"Never Give Up"				2		6	1	1	10
7	"Six Feet Under"	3	6	6	6	7	8	7	10	53
8	"Where Did You Go"		4	10		3	5	8	7	37
9	"Släpp alla sorger"	4			1	1		2		8
10	"Tattoo"	8	12	12	12	12	12	12	12	92
11	"Mer av dig"	12	5	5	7	2	3	6	2	42
12	"Royals"	10	10	4	8	8	7	5	4	56
International jury spokespersons
Croatia – Zlata Mück; Austria – Marvin Dietmann; Latvia – Jānis Pētersons; Belgium – Birgit Simal; Malta – Gordon Bonello; Australia – Dale Roberts; Germany – Alexandra Wolfslast; Spain – Eva Mora

Detailed televoting results
R/O	Song	Votes	Age groups							Tel.	Total
R/O	Song	Votes	3‍–‍9	10‍–‍15	16‍–‍29	30‍–‍44	45‍–‍59	60‍–‍74	75+	Tel.	Total
1	"Where You Are (Sávežan)"	2,017,718	6	5	5	7	7	10	10	8	58
2	"Rhythm of My Show"	1,241,991	3	1	1						5
3	"One Day"	1,184,378				1	3	6	4	2	16
4	"Air"	2,565,958	10	10	10	8	8	7	7	7	67
5	"On My Way"	1,837,663	5	7	6	3	1		2	1	25
6	"Never Give Up"	1,786,719	4	6	2	2	4	5	8	6	37
7	"Six Feet Under"	2,431,405	8	4	8	10	10	8	1	10	59
8	"Where Did You Go"	1,841,580	7	8	3	4	5	3	6	3	39
9	"Släpp alla sorger"	1,854,602	2	2	7	5	6	4	5	5	36
10	"Tattoo"	3,783,148	1	12	12	12	12	12	12	12	85
11	"Mer av dig"	1,915,643	12	3	4	6	2	2	3	4	36
12	"Royals"	1,060,383						1			1

== Ratings ==
Viewing figures by show
Show	Air date	Viewers (millions)	Share (%)
Heat 1	4 February 2023	2.912	78.1
Heat 2	11 February 2023	2.830	74.6
Heat 3	18 February 2023	2.598	72
Heat 4	25 February 2023	2.814	73.9
Semi-final	4 March 2023	2.315	72.4
Final	11 March 2023	3.419	83

== Gallery ==
=== Heat 1 ===
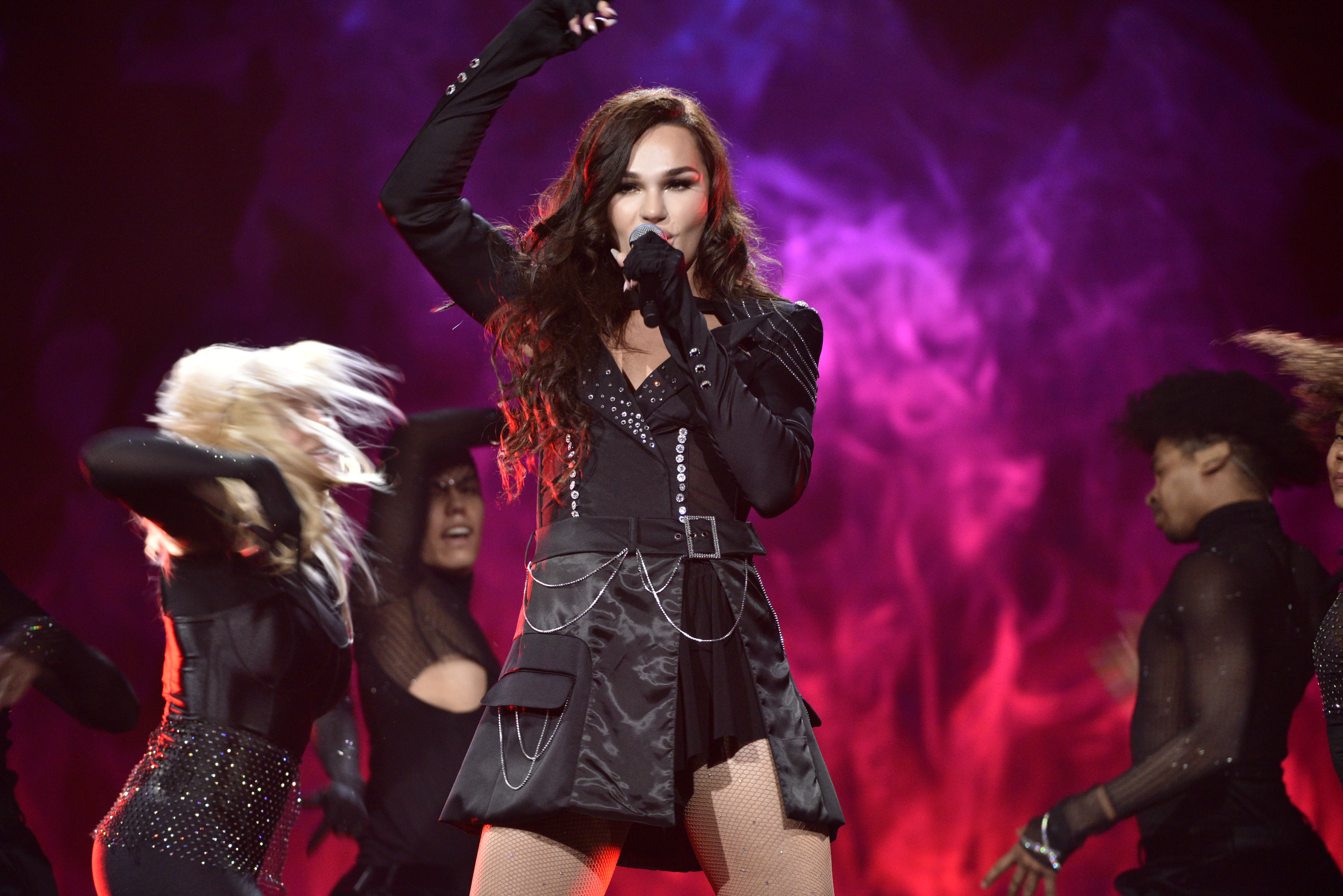
Tone Sekelius – "Rhythm of My Show"

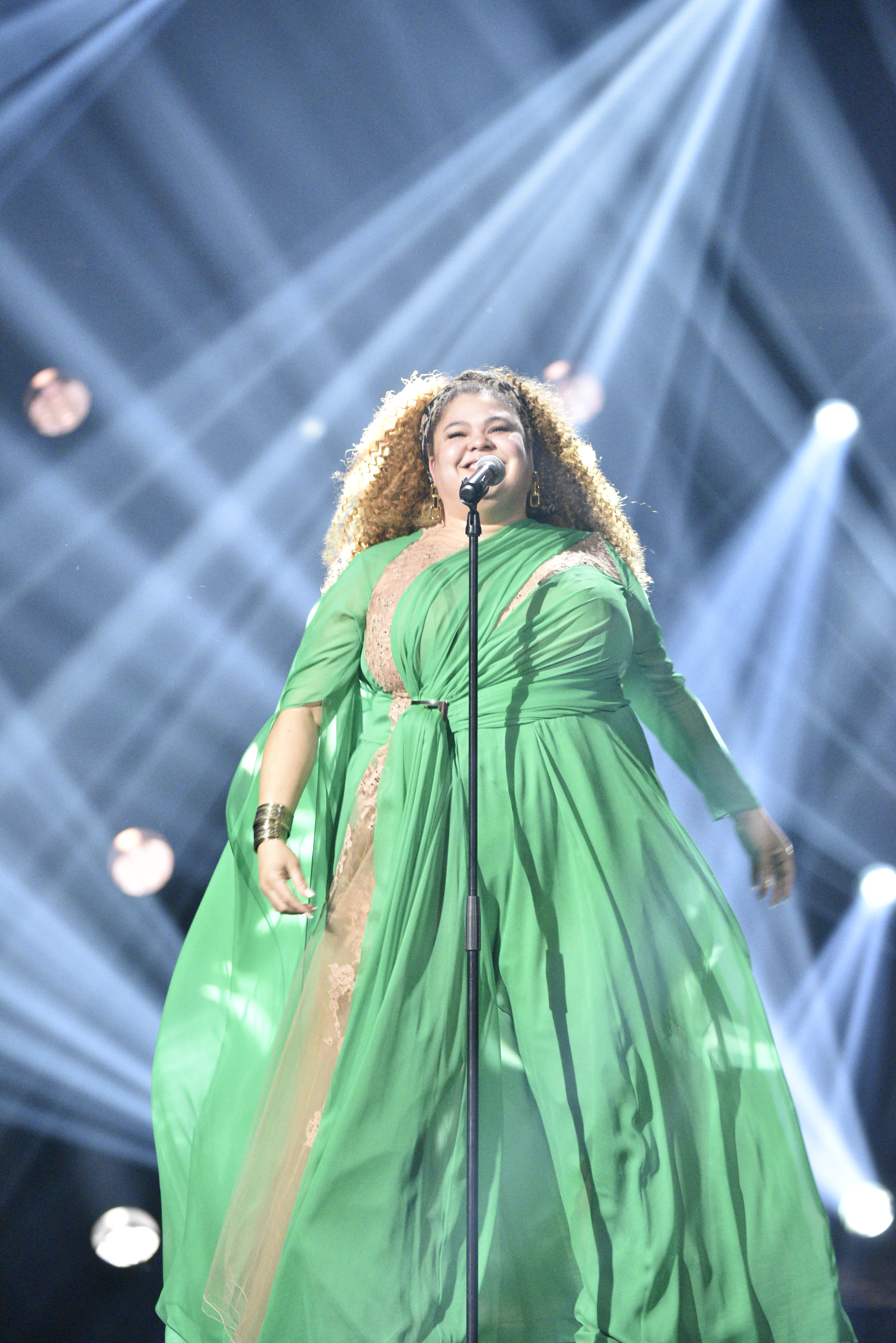
Loulou Lamotte – "Inga sorger"

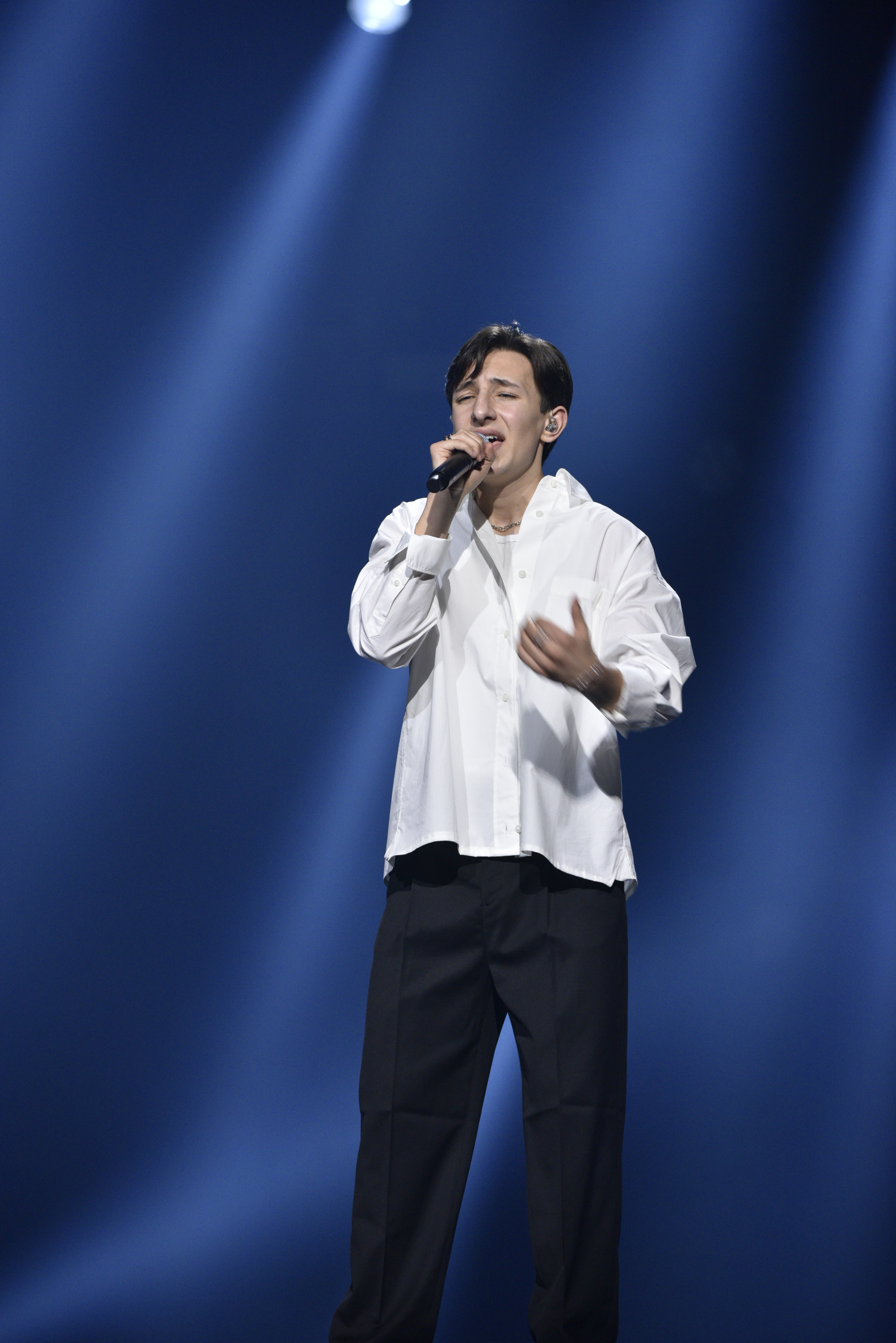
Rejhan – "Haunted"

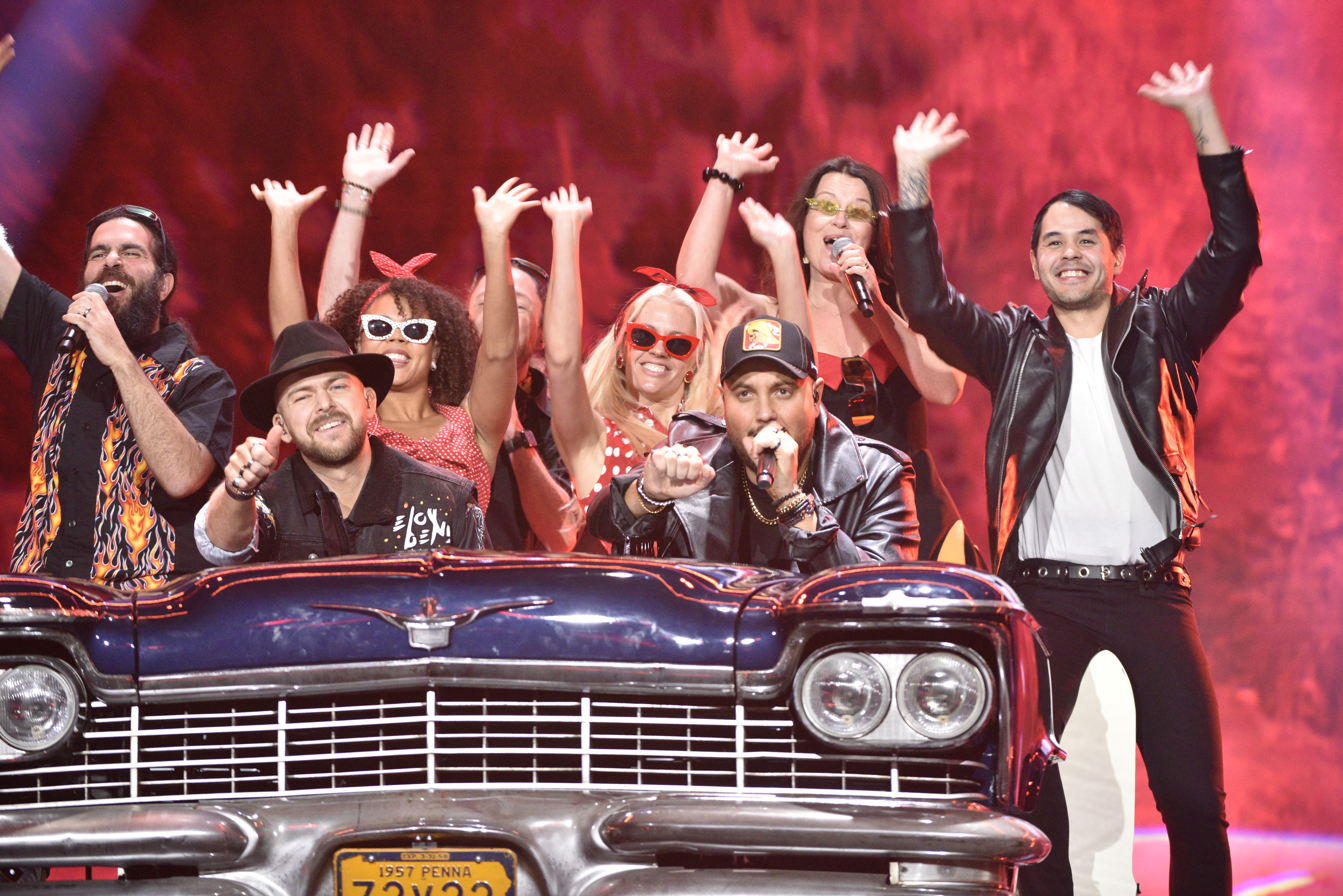
Elov & Beny – "Raggen går"

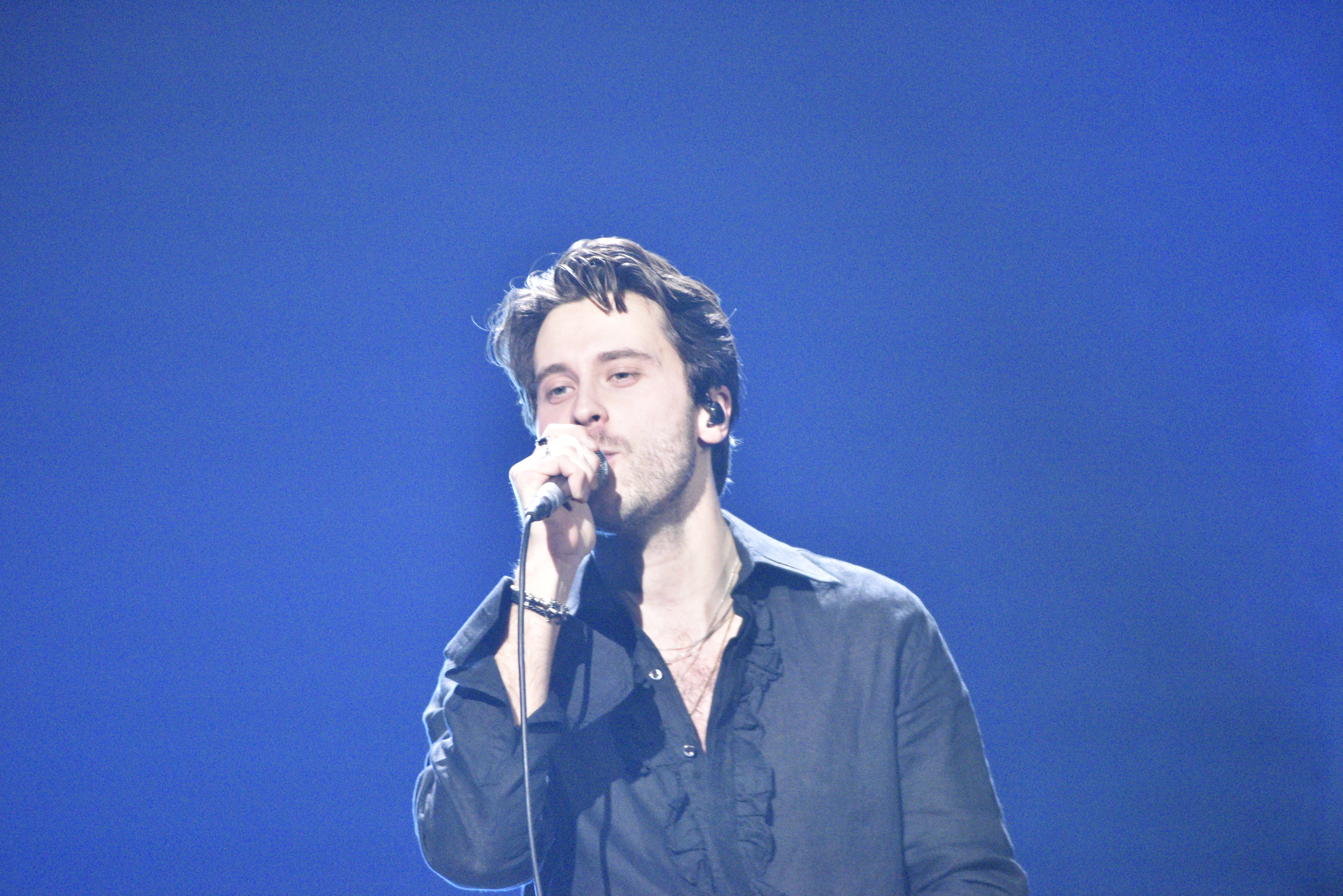
Victor Crone – "Diamonds"

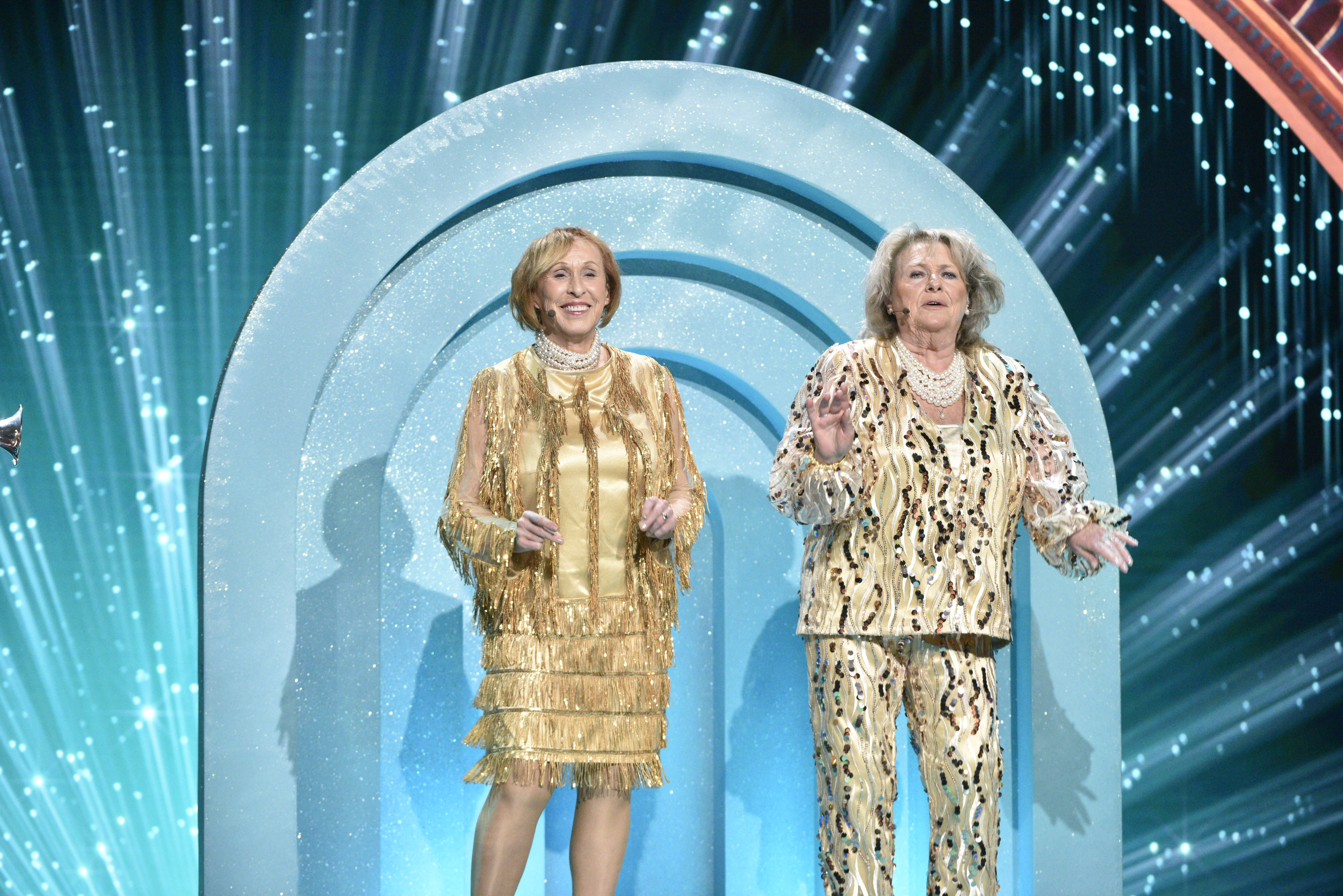
Eva Rydberg & Ewa Roos – "Länge leve livet"

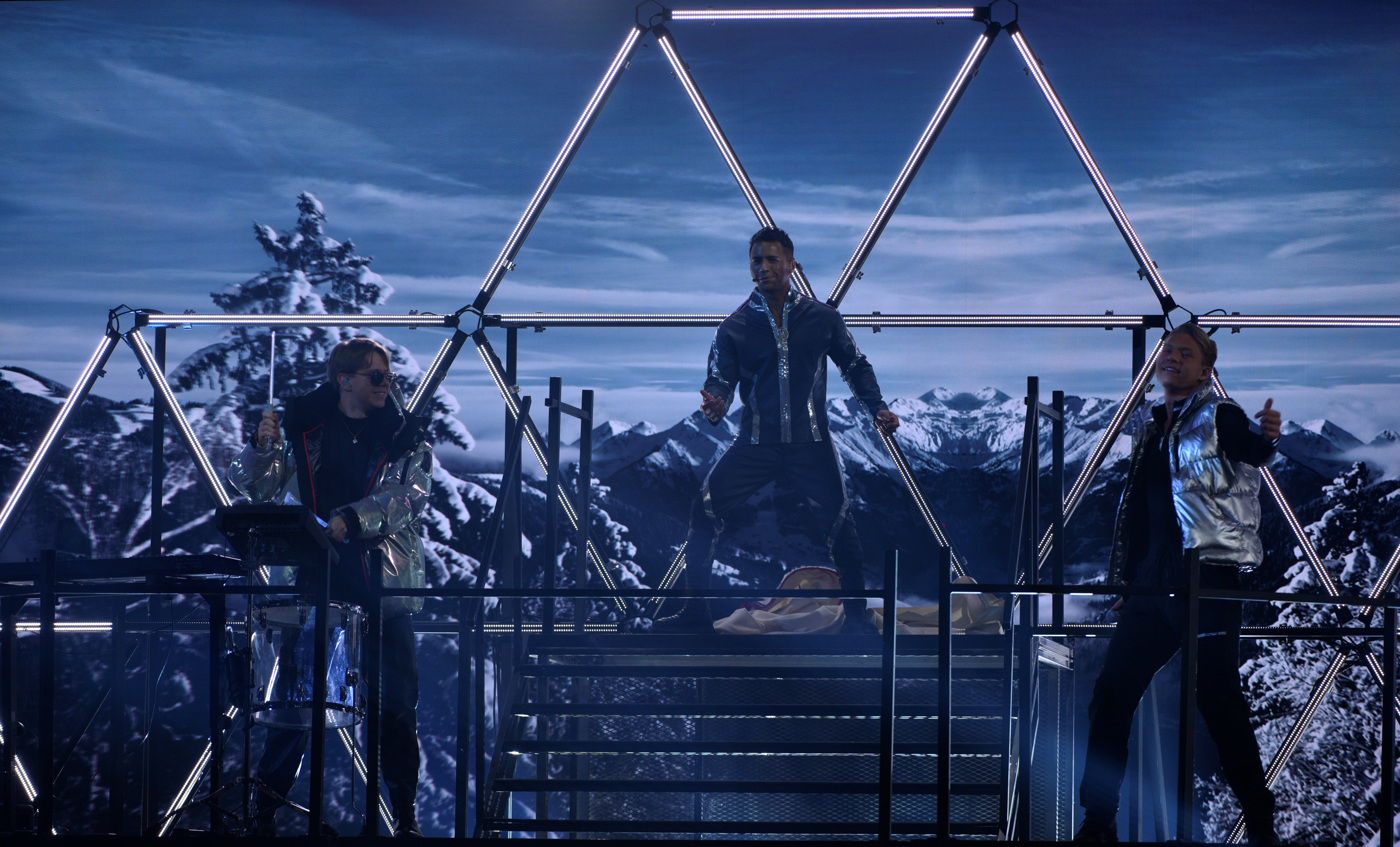
Jon Henrik Fjällgren, Arc North feat. Adam Woods – "Where You Are (Sávežan)"

=== Heat 2 ===
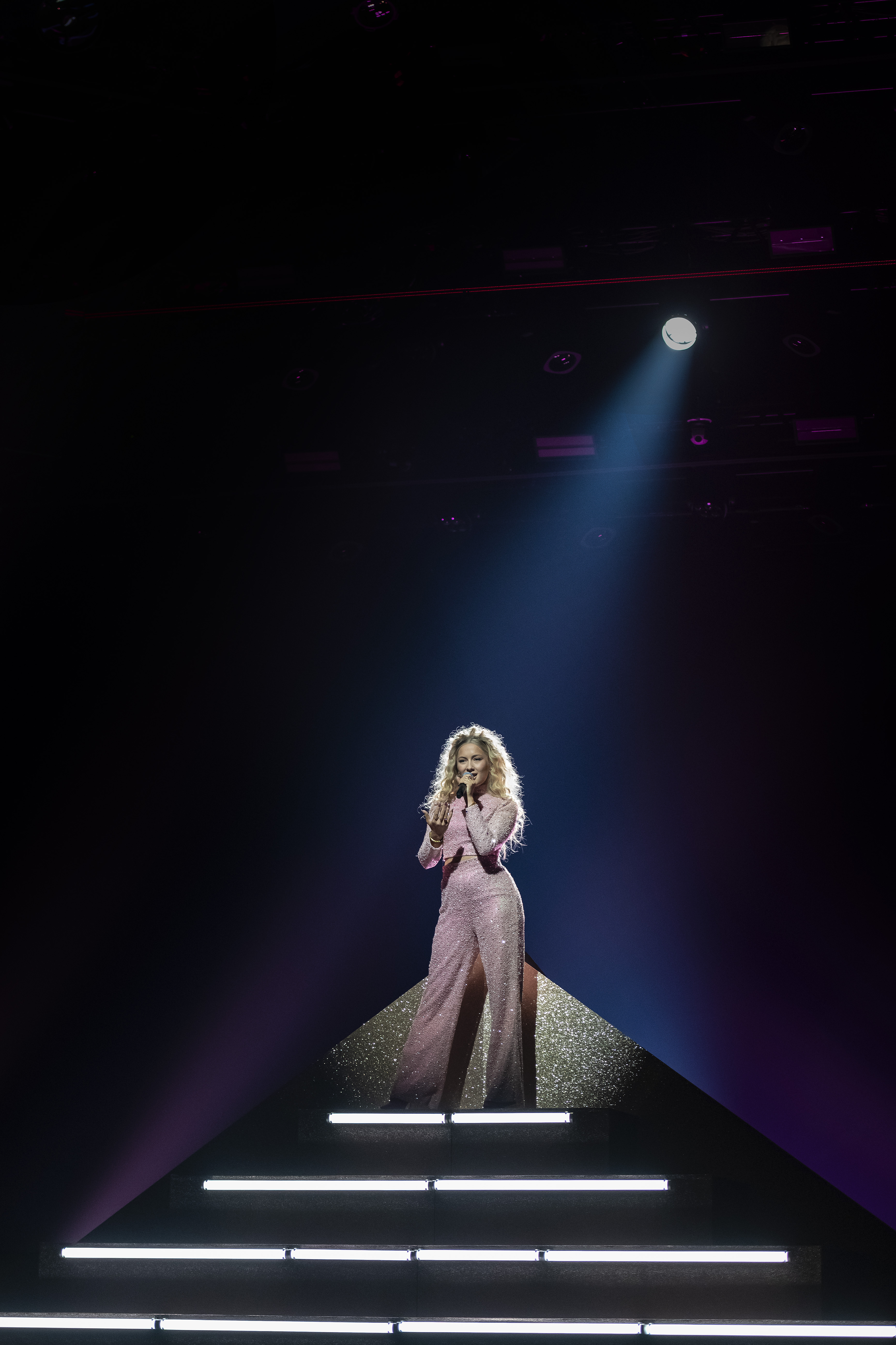
Wiktoria – "All My Life (Where Have You Been)"

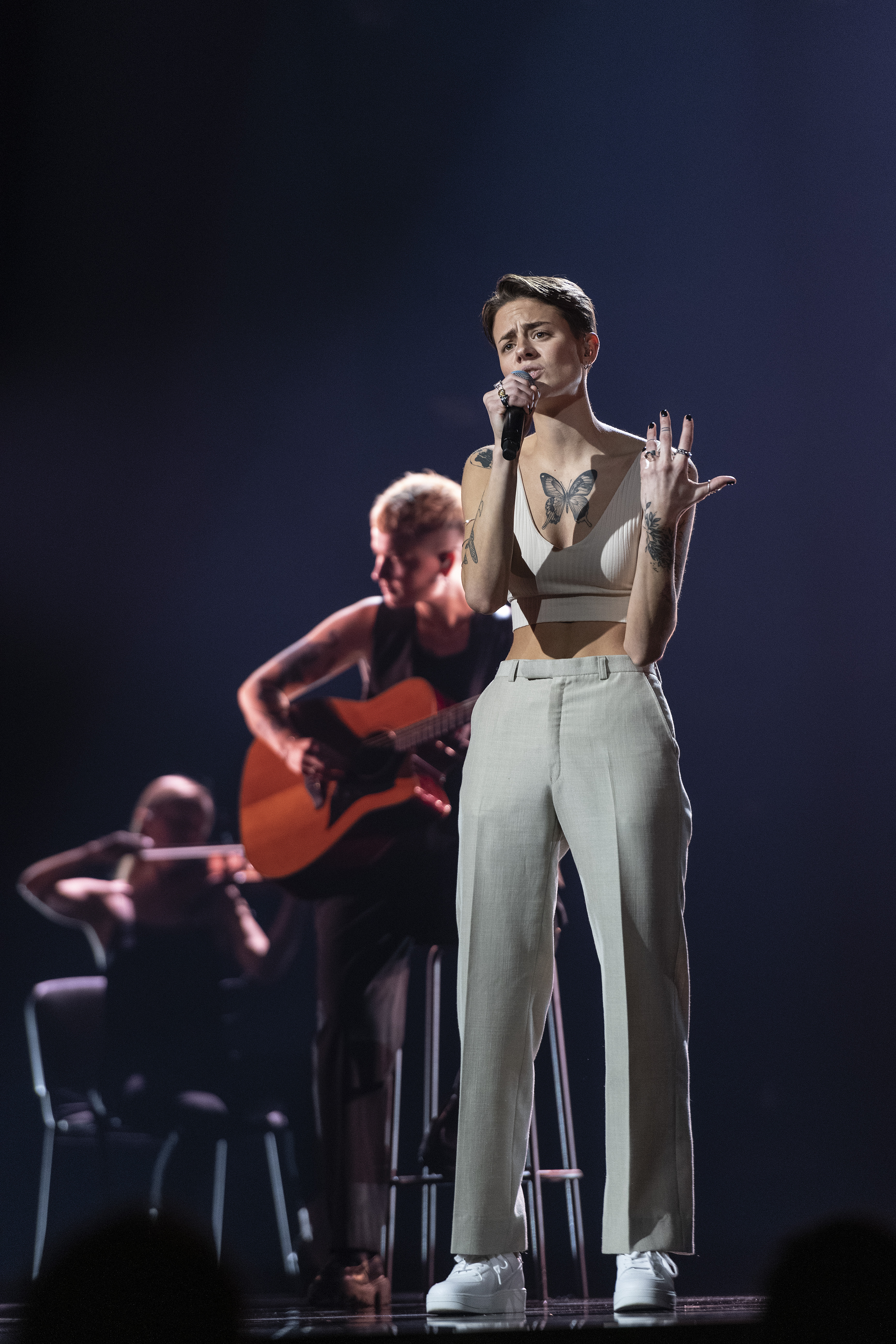
Eden – "Comfortable"

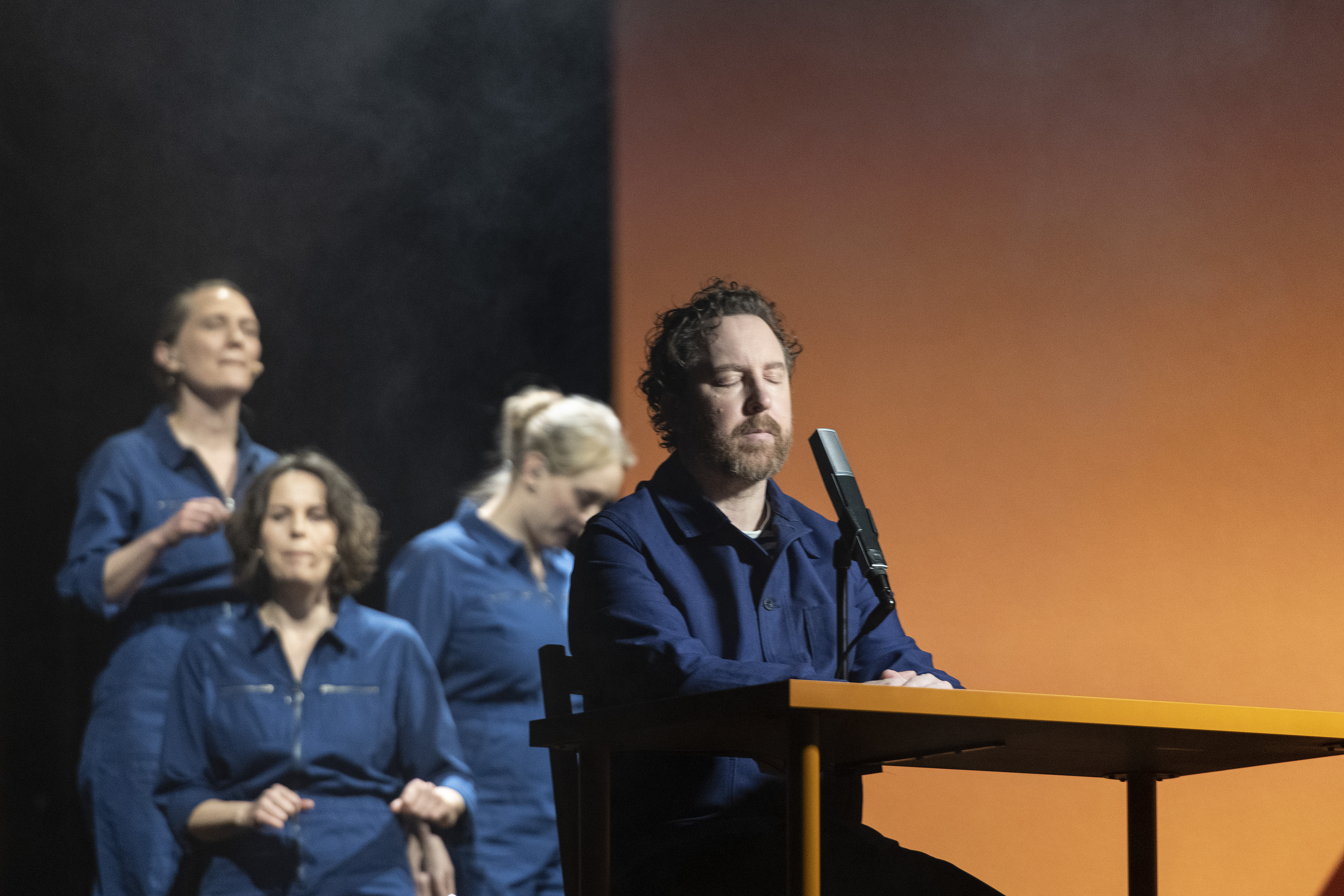
Uje Brandelius – "Grytan"

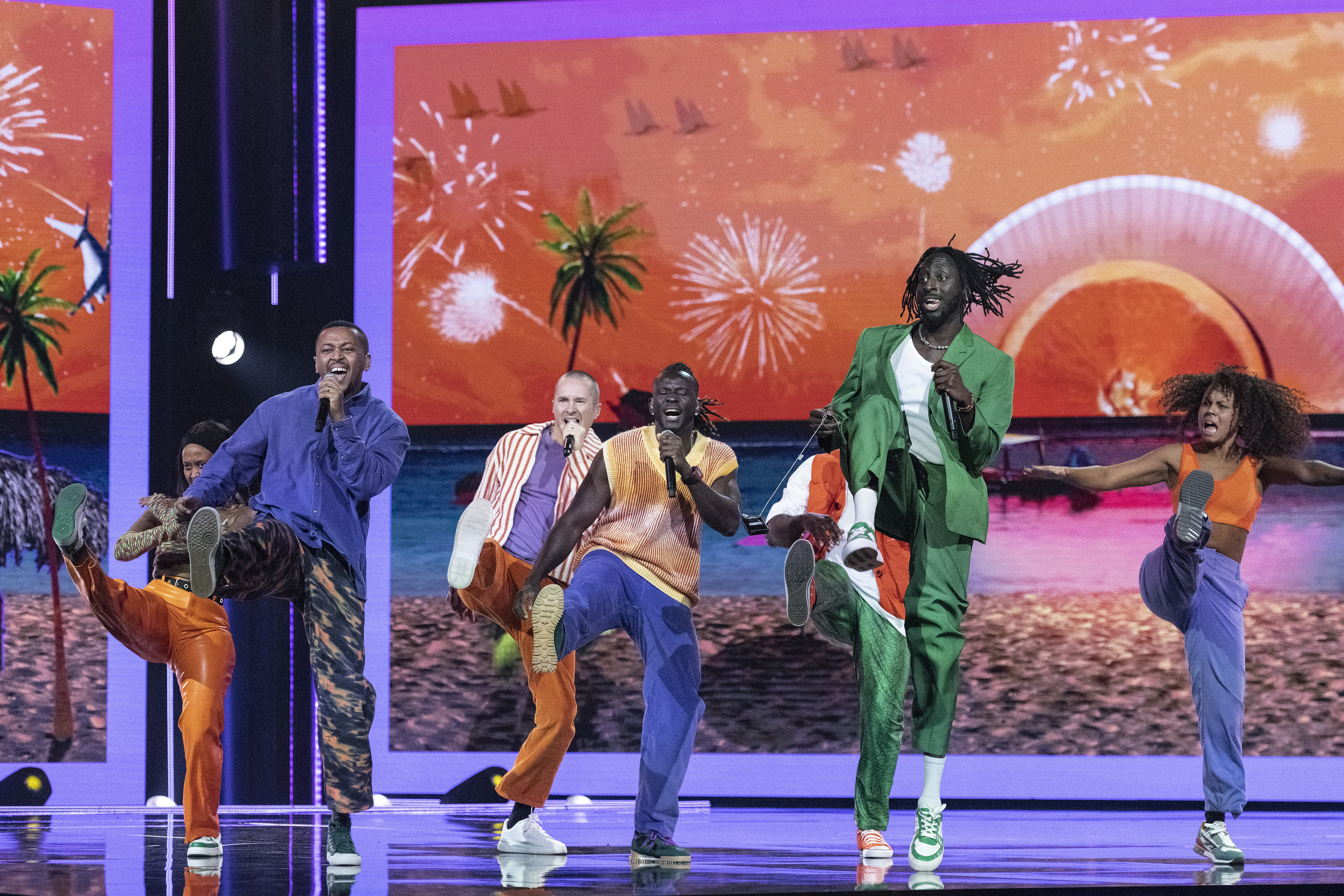
Panetoz – "On My Way"

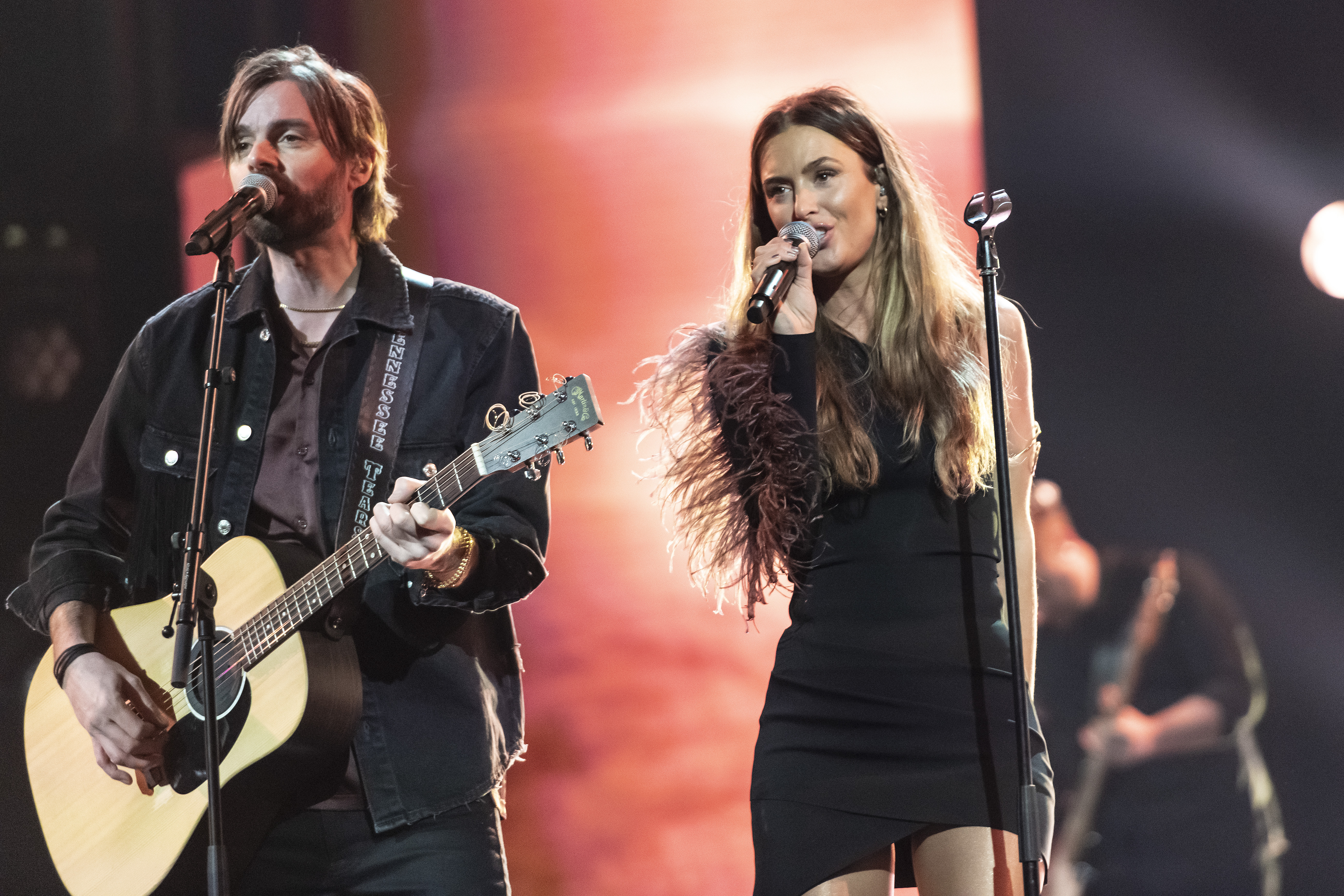
Tennessee Tears – "Now I Know"

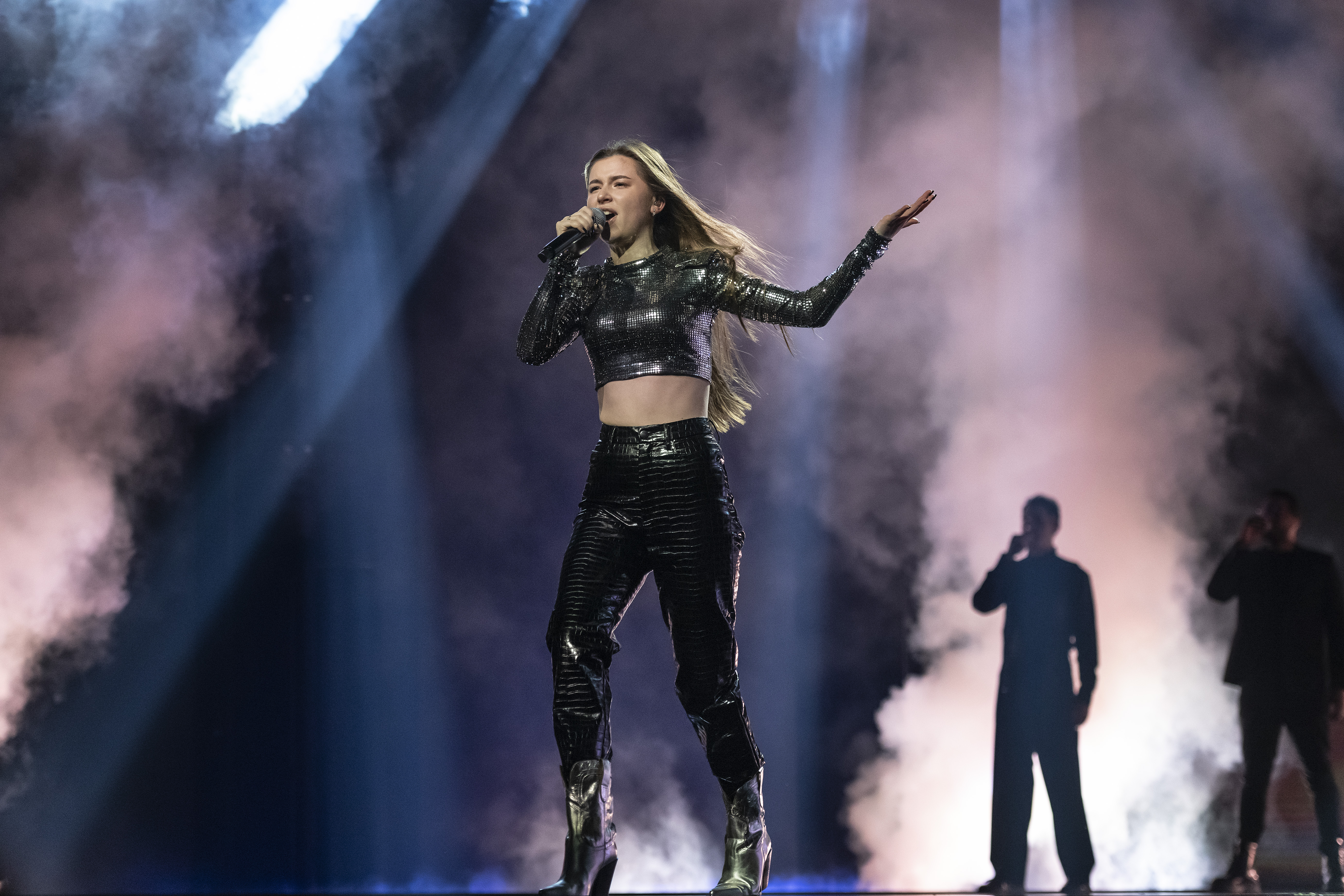
Maria Sur – "Never Give Up"

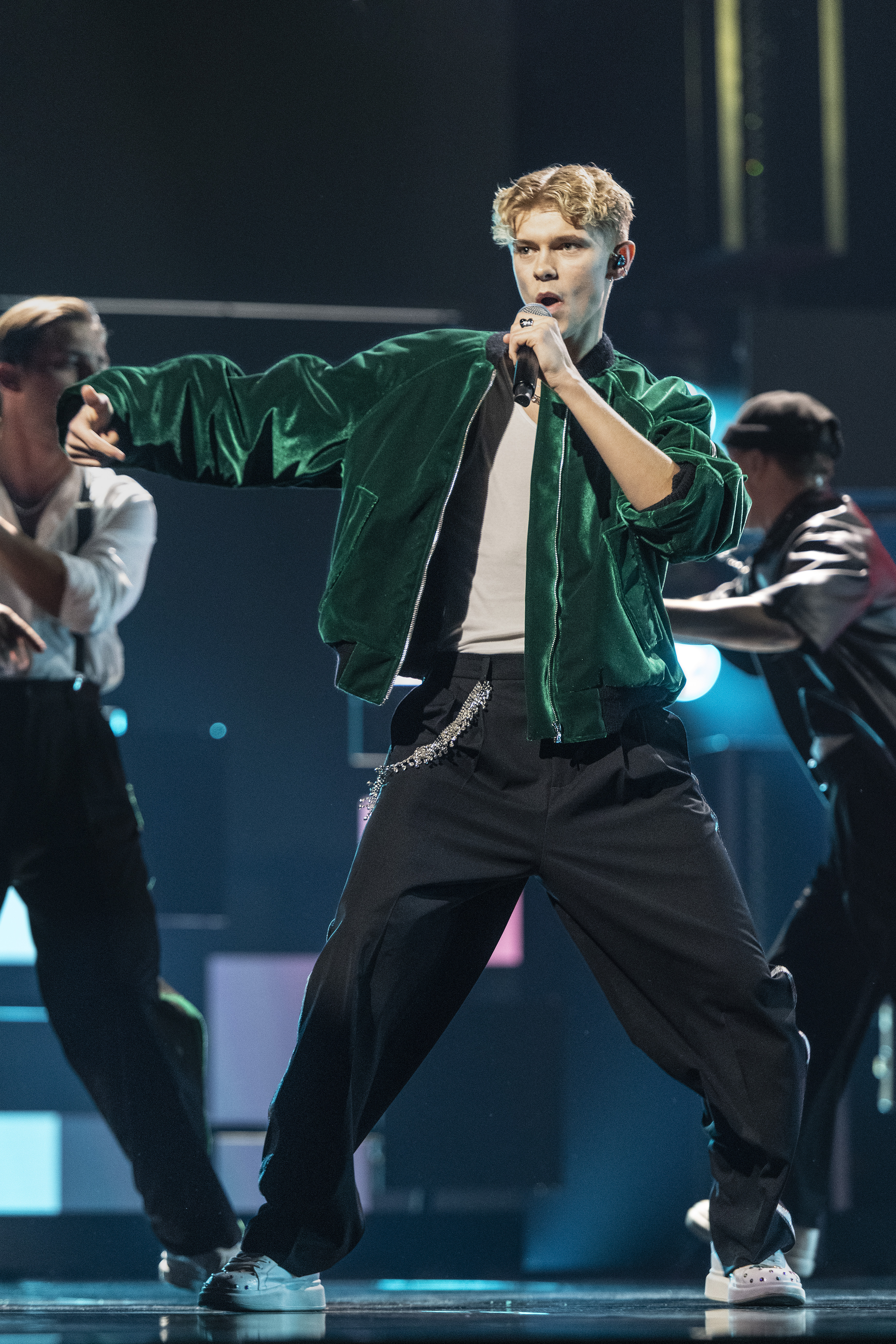
Theoz – "Mer av dig"

=== Heat 3 ===
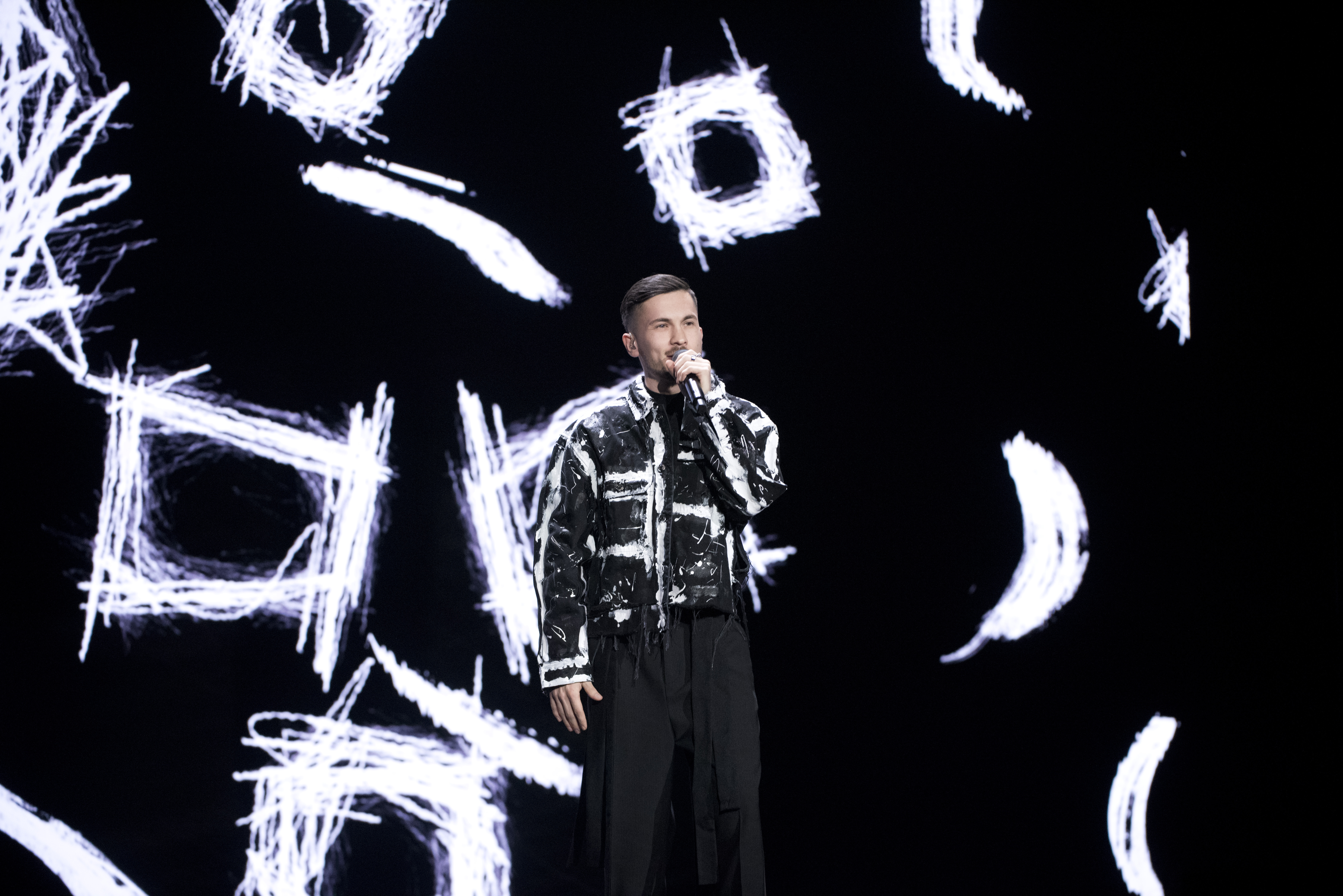
Paul Rey – "Royals"

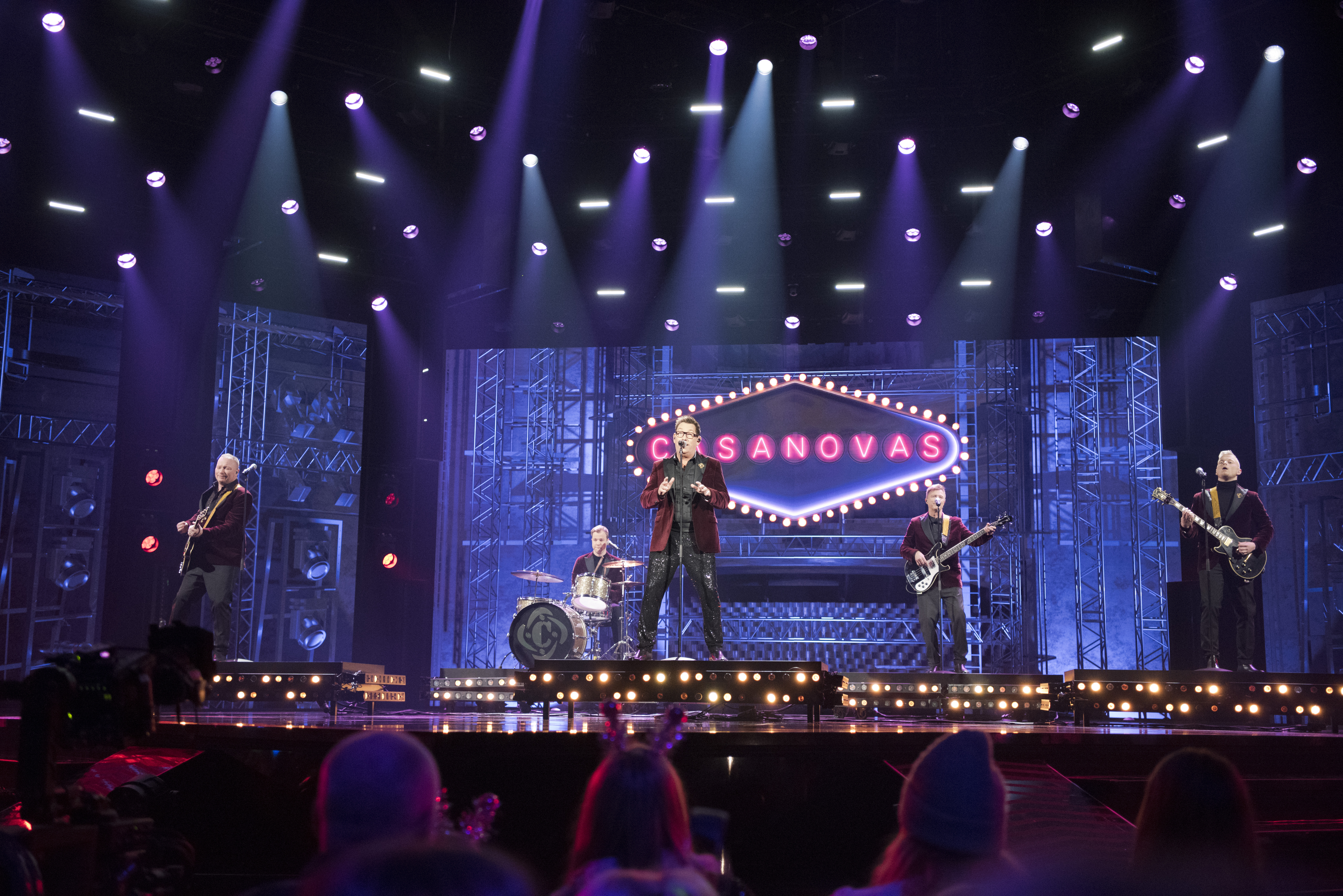
Casanovas – "Så kommer känslorna tillbaka"

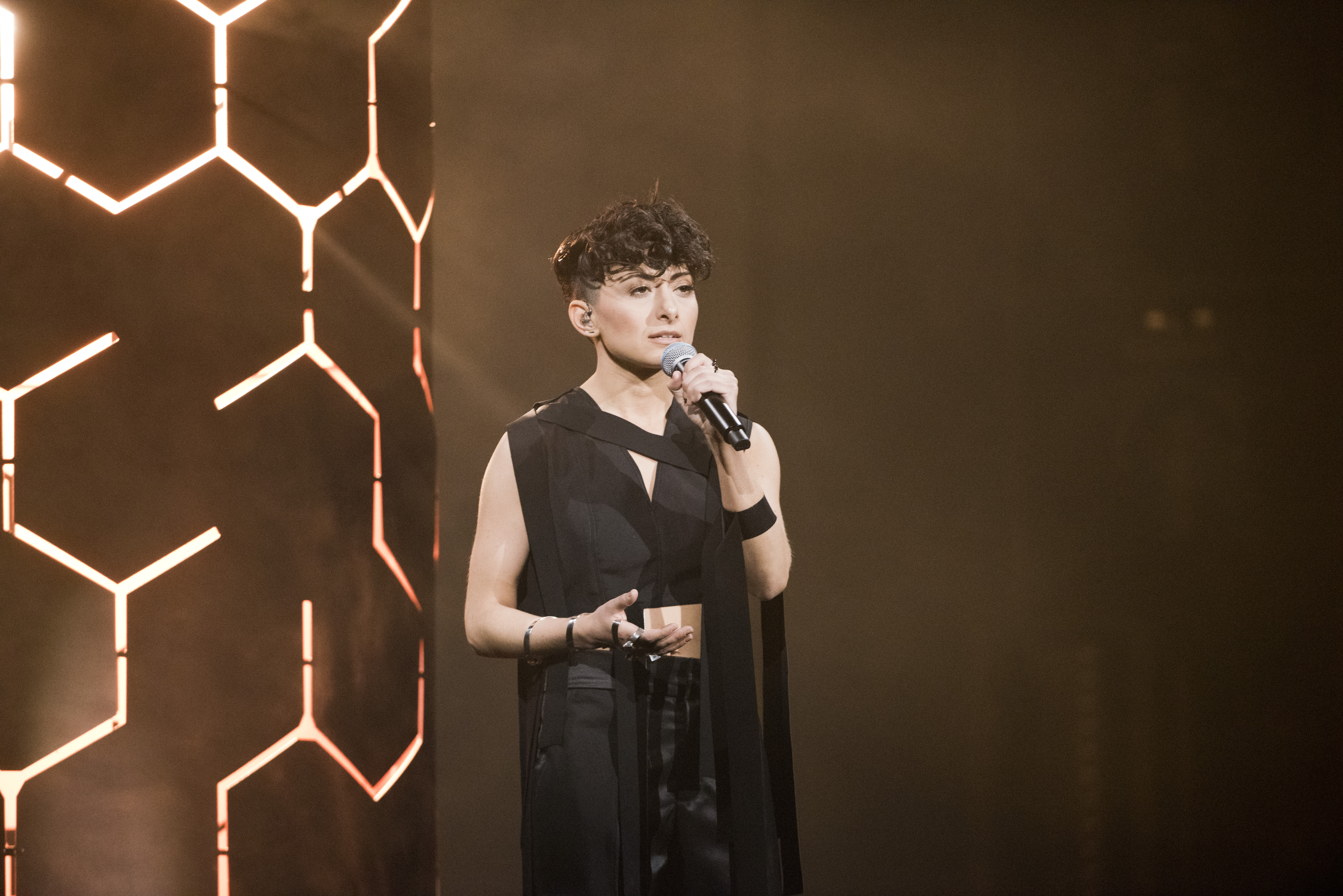
Melanie Wehbe – "For the Show"

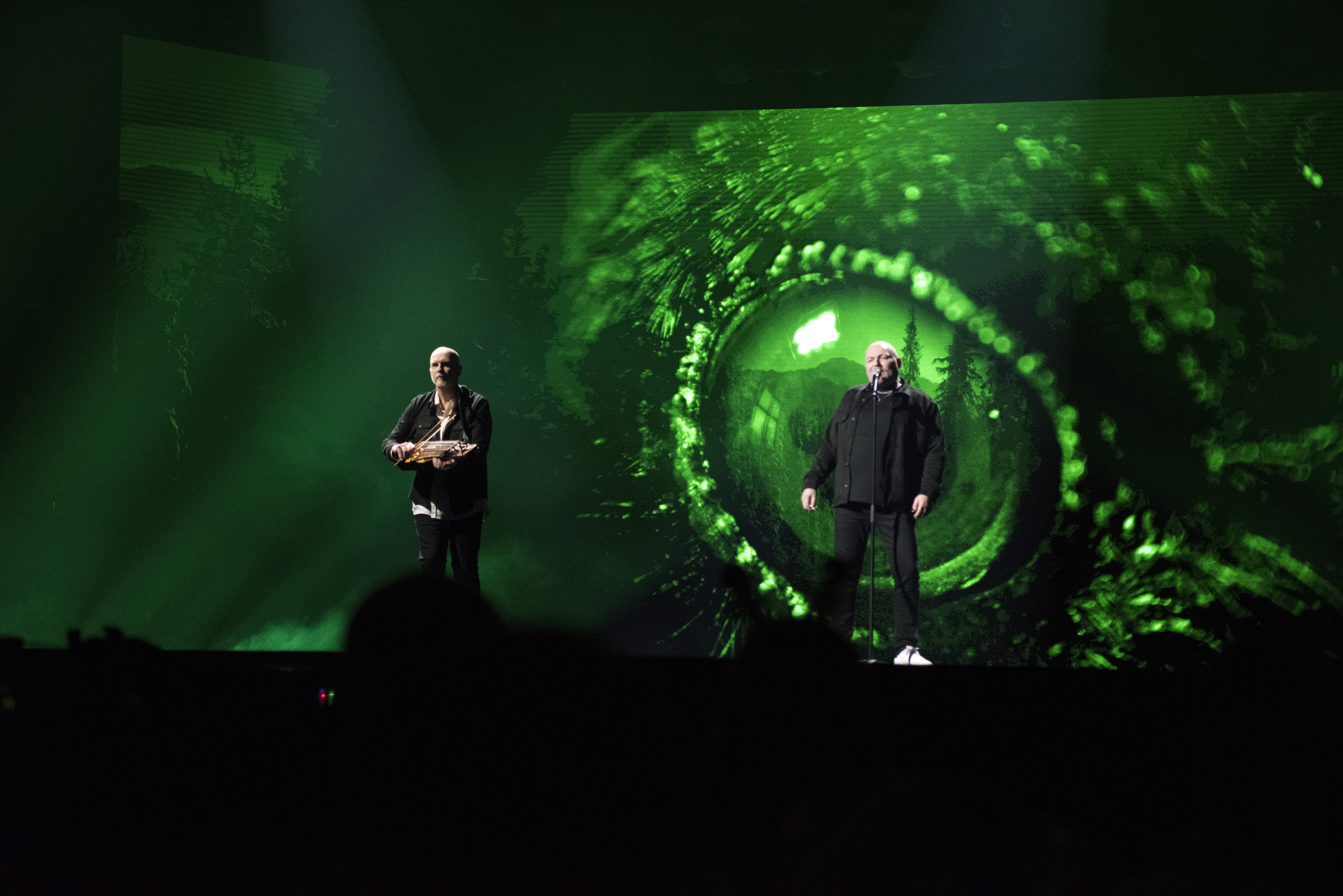
Nordman – "Släpp alla sorger"

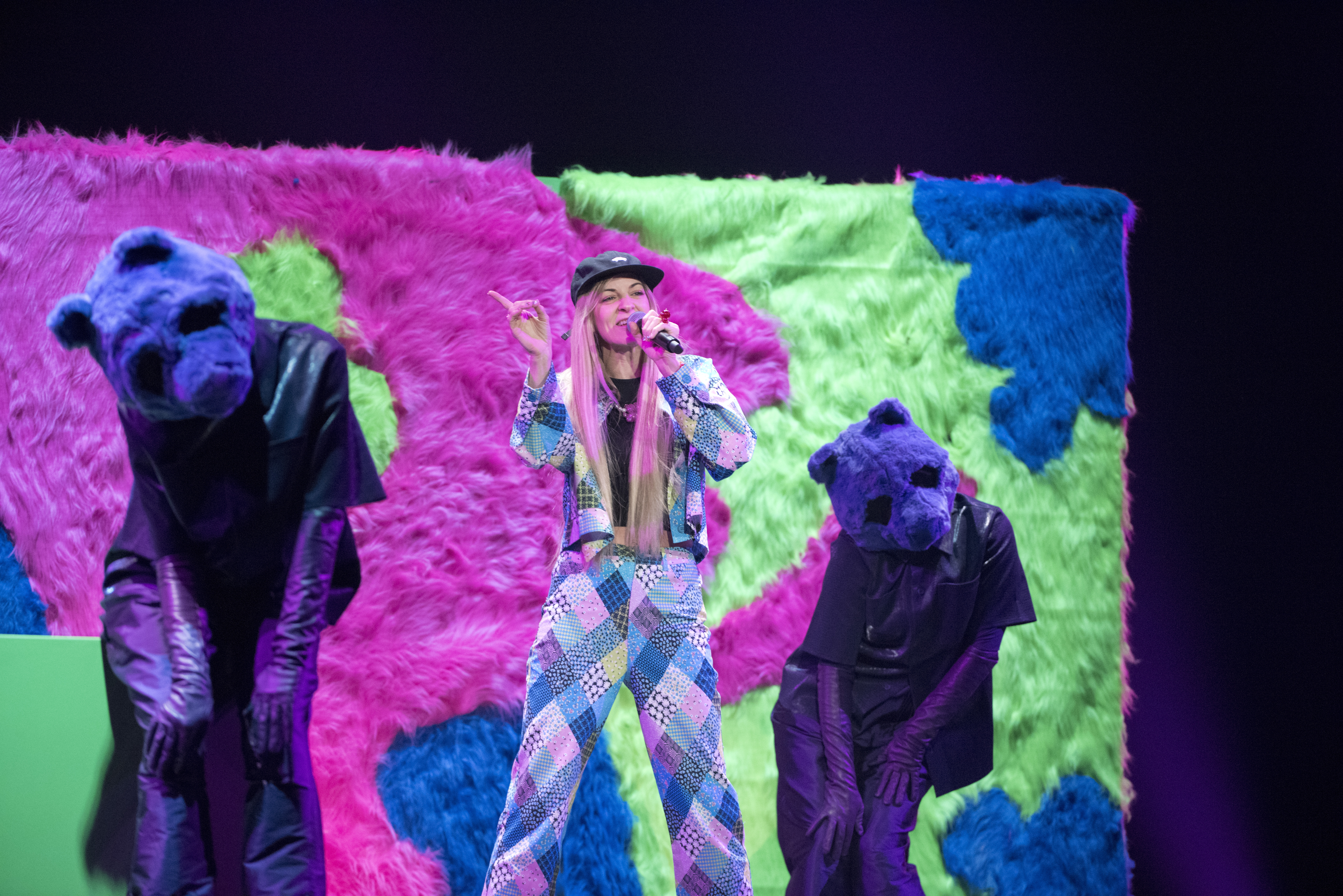
Laurell – "Sober"

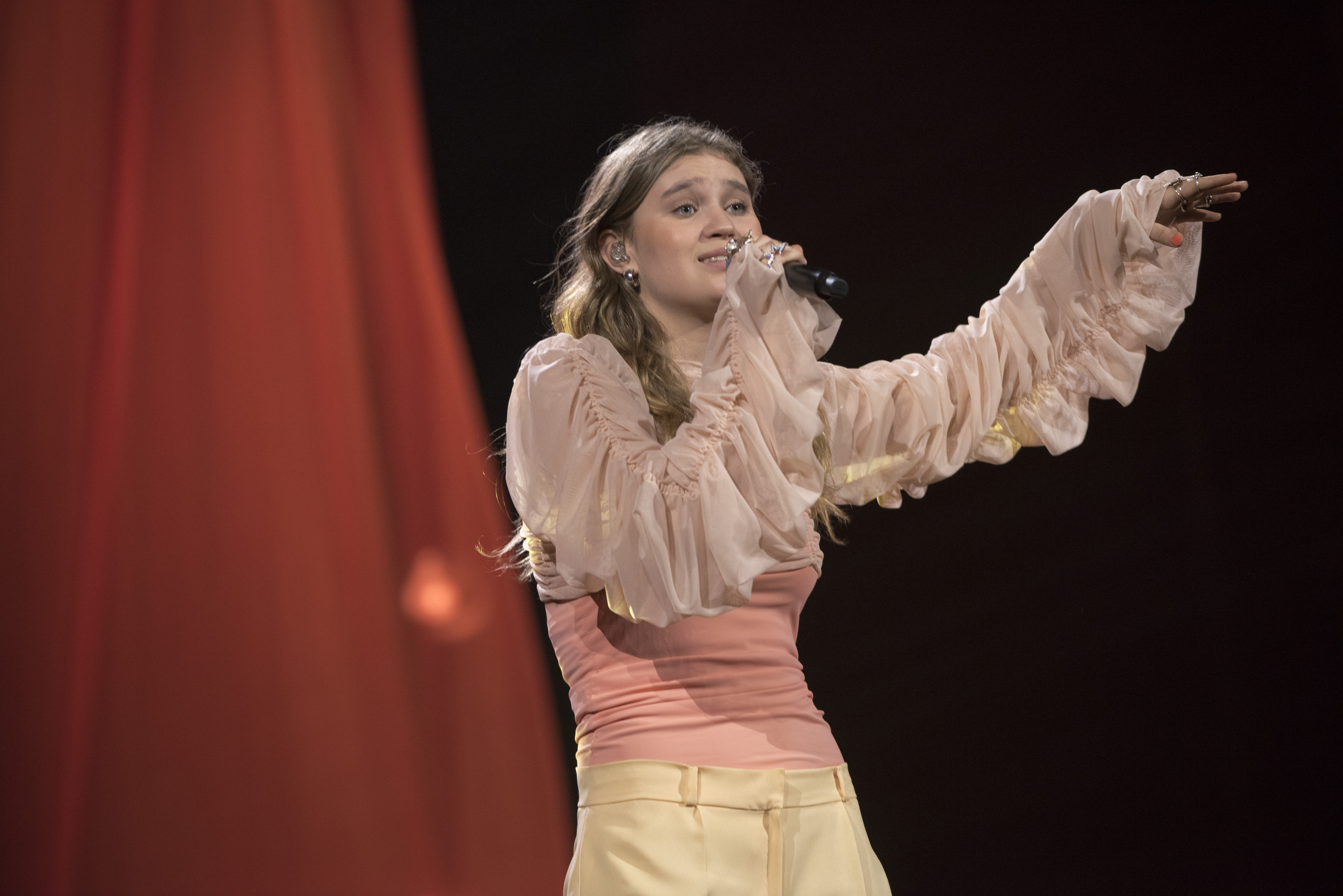
Ida-Lova – "Låt hela stan se på"

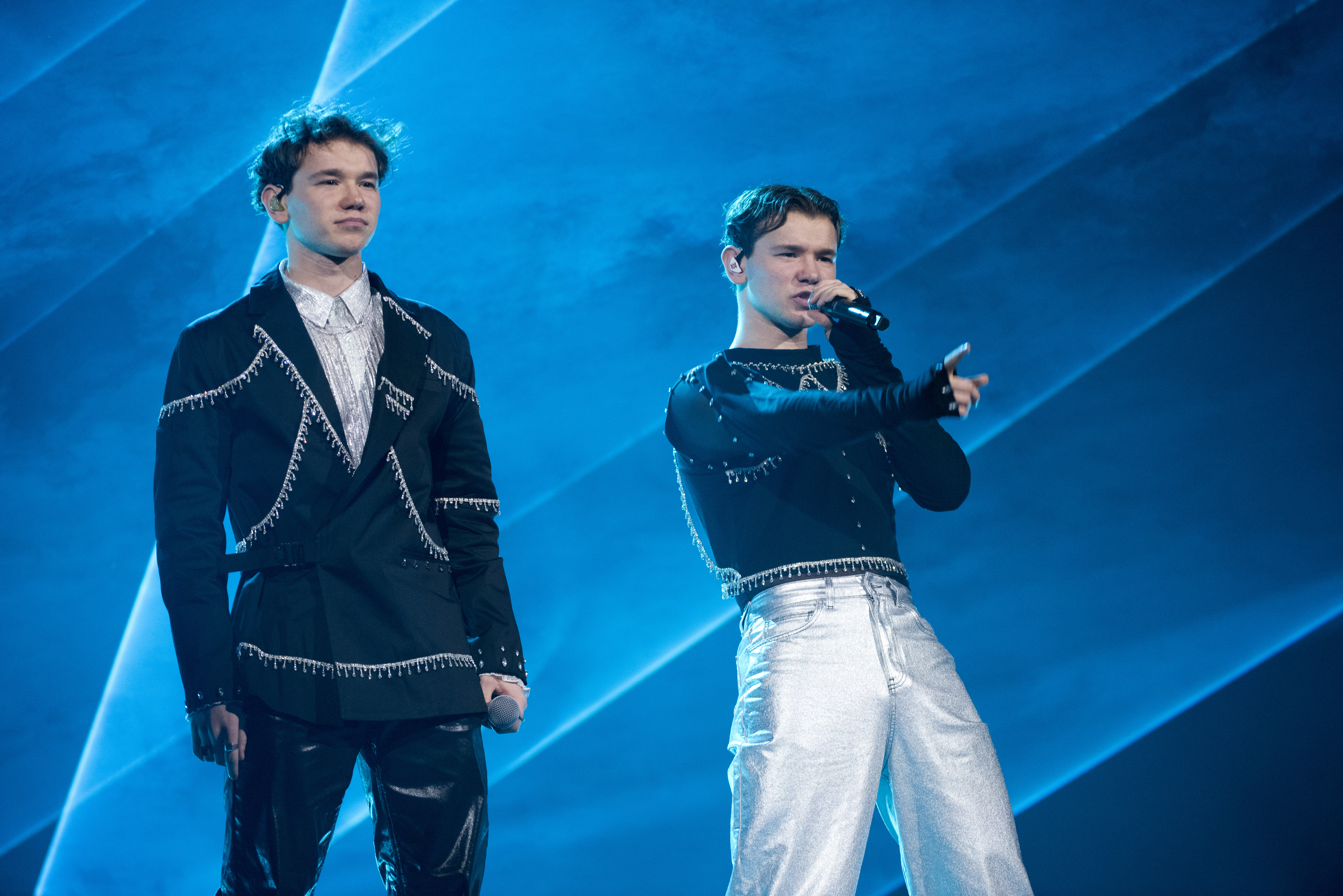
Marcus & Martinus – "Air"

=== Heat 4 ===
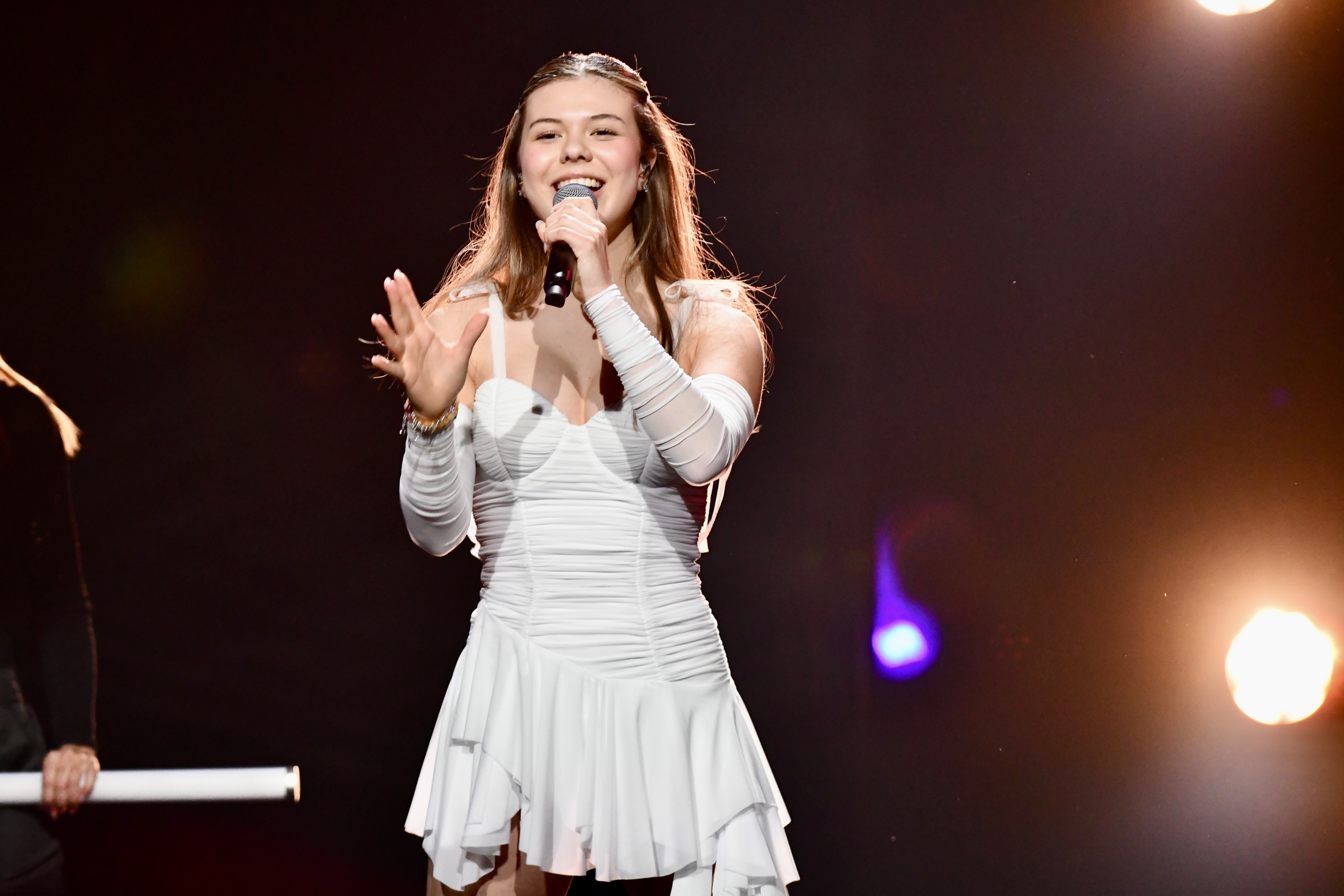
Kiana – "Where Did You Go"

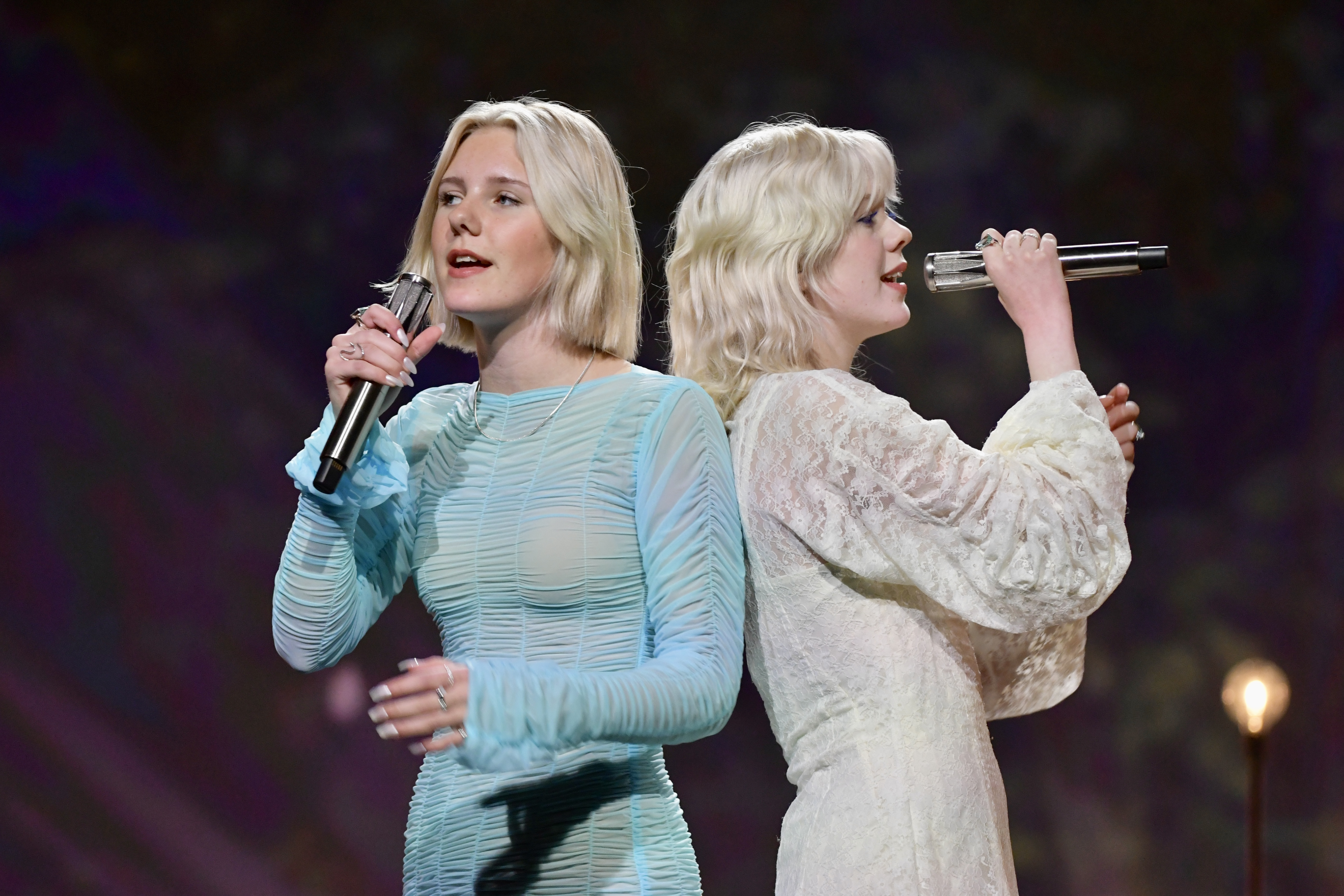
Signe & Hjördis – "Edelweiss"

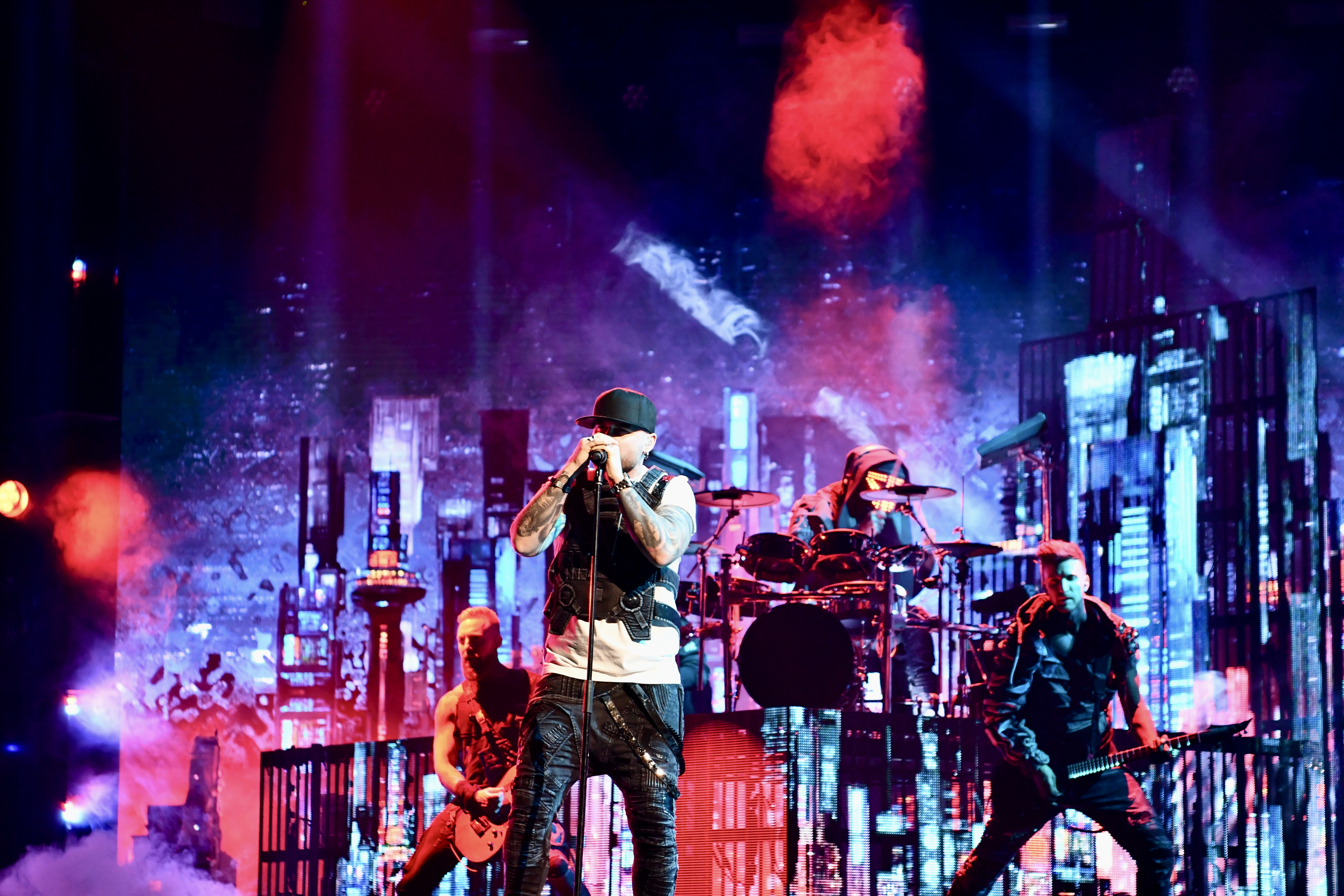
Smash Into Pieces – "Six Feet Under"

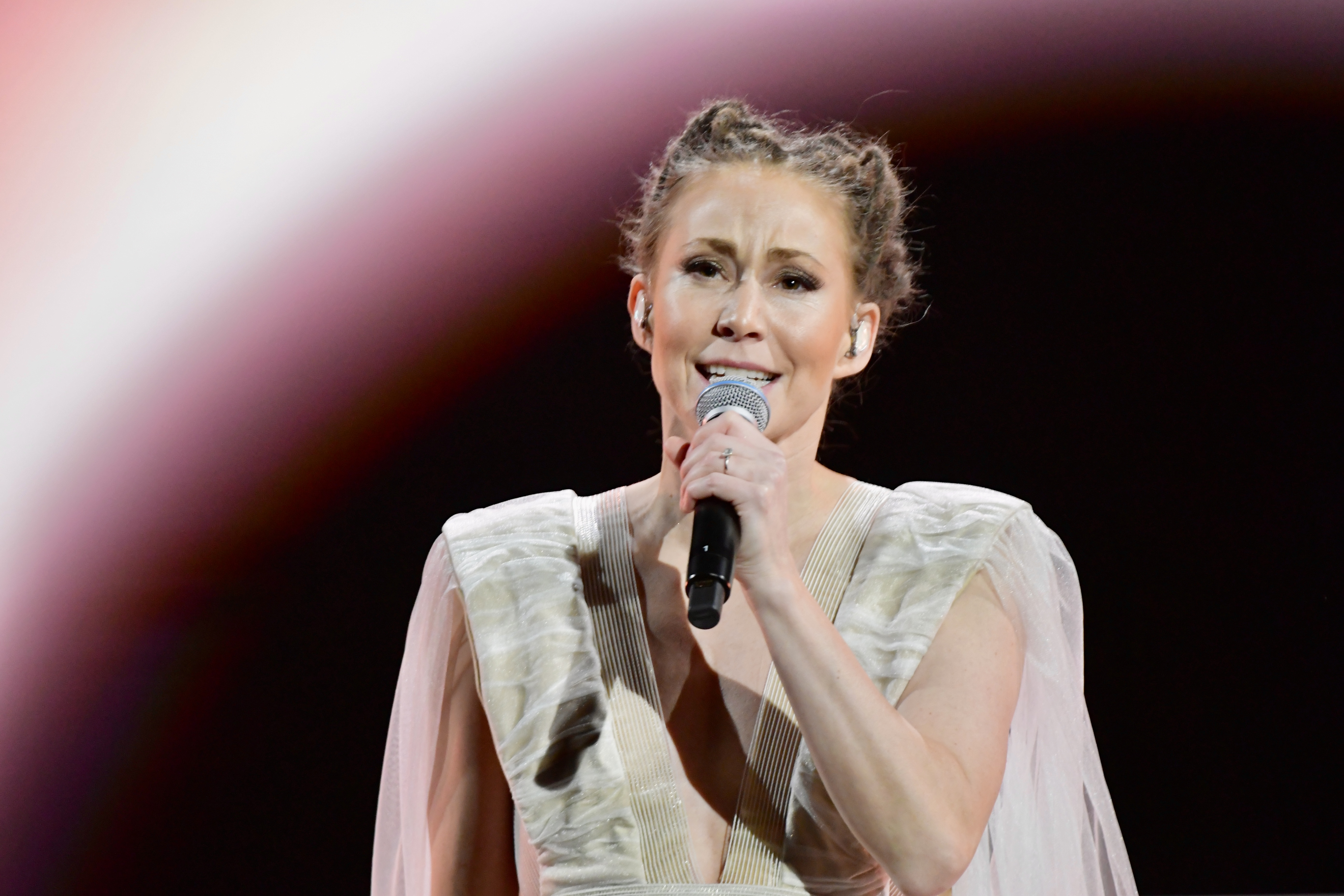
Mariette – "One Day"

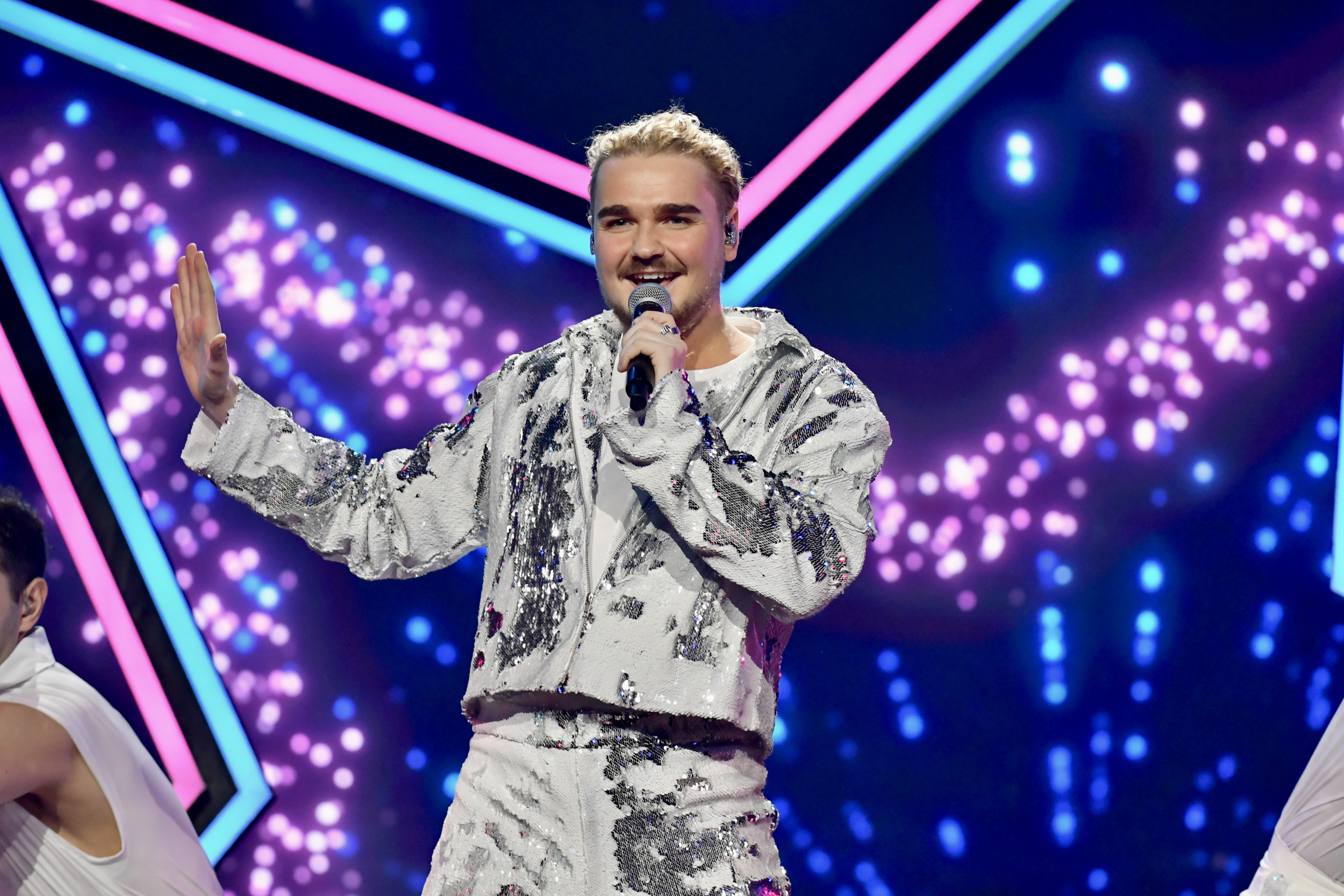
Emil Henrohn – "Mera mera mera"

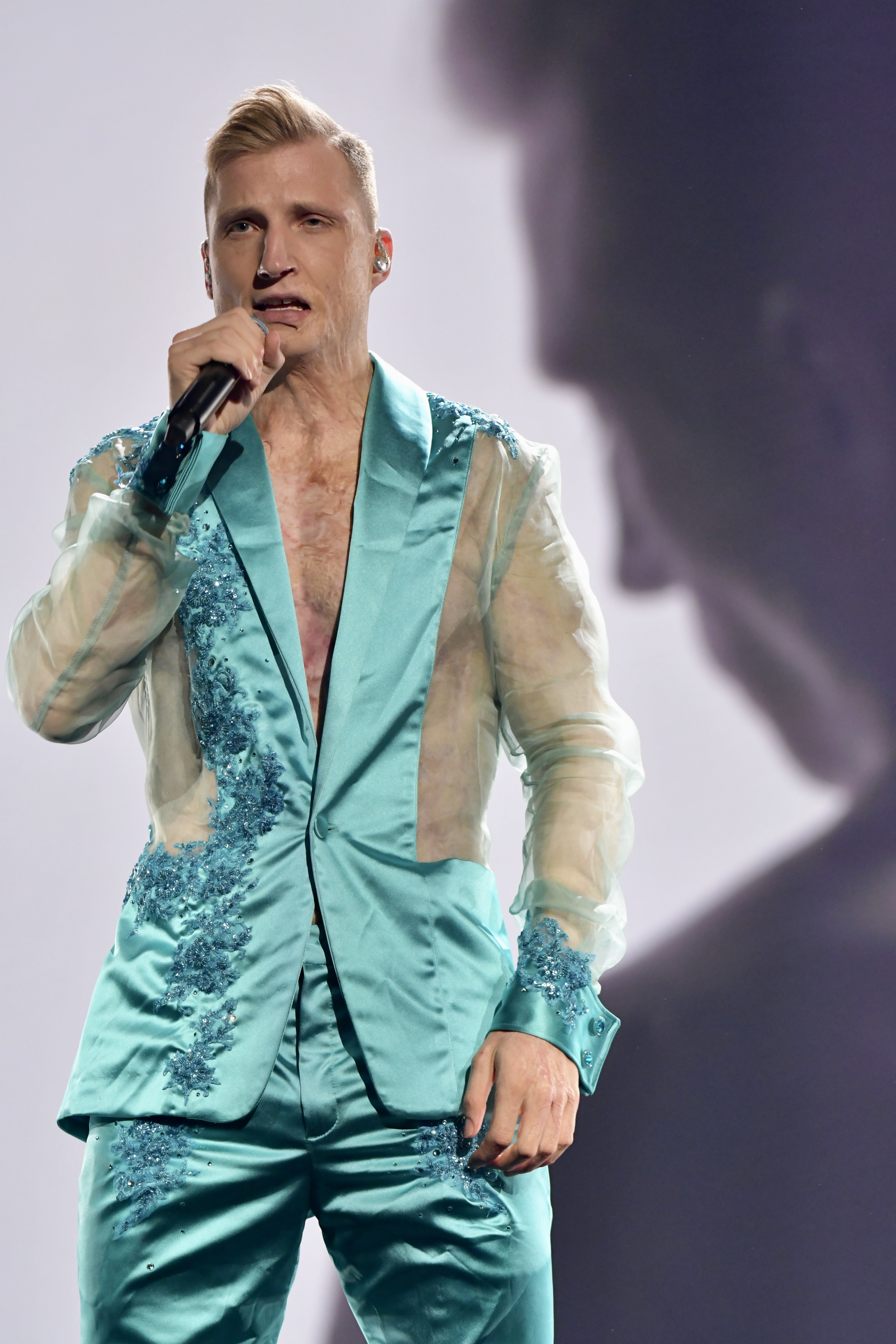
Axel Schylström – "Gorgeous"

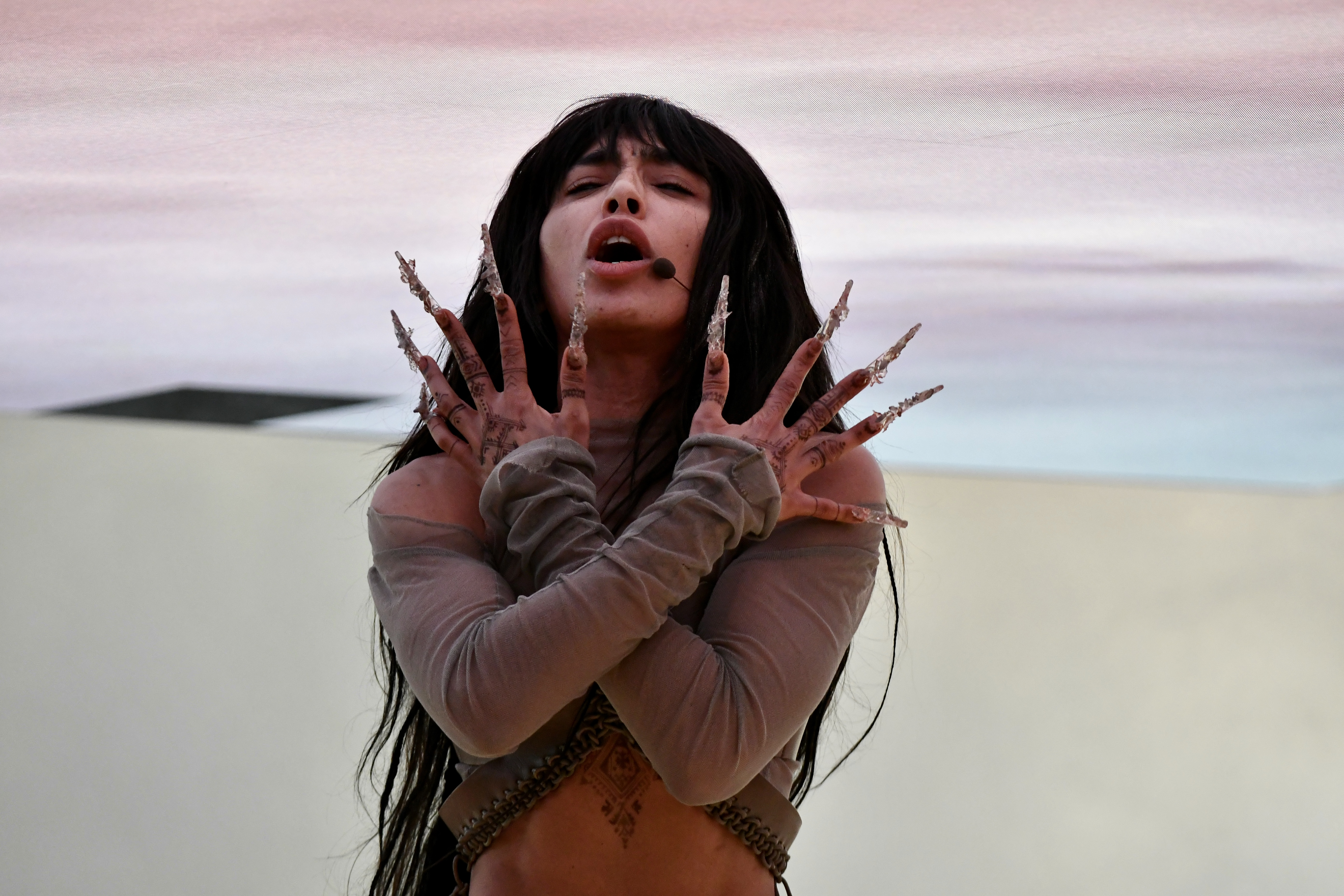
Loreen – "Tattoo"
