= Ida-Lova =

Swedish singer and songwriter

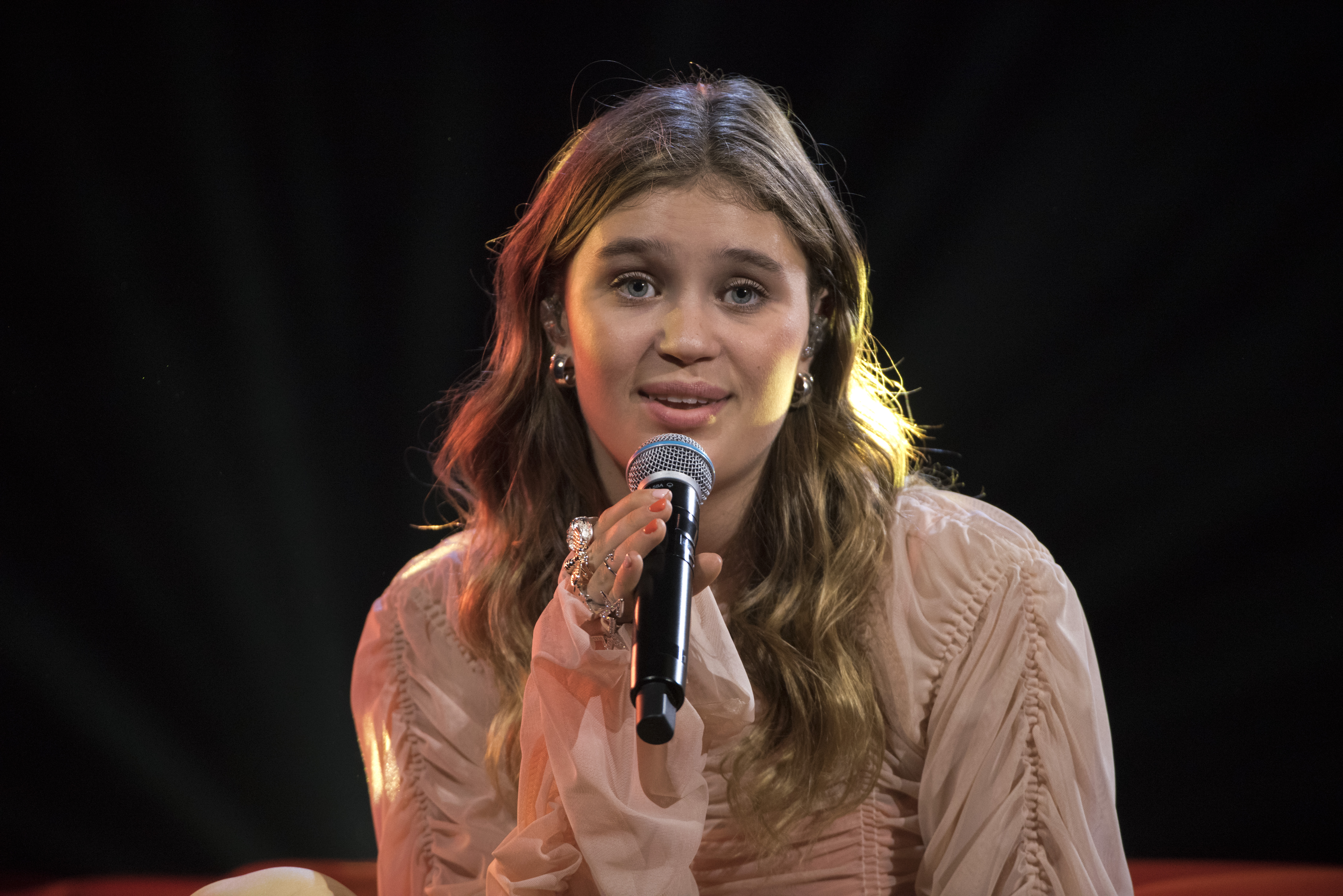
- Ida-Lova in 2023

Background information
- Born: Ida-Lova Lind; 2 August 2004 (age 21); Stockholm, Sweden
- Occupation: Singer
- Label: Argle Bargle Studios

Ida-Lova Saga Lind (born 2 August 2004), known as Ida-Lova, is a Swedish singer and songwriter. She participated in Melodifestivalen 2023, where she performed the song "Låt hela stan se på" a song she co-wrote together with Andreas "Giri" Lindbergh, Joy and Linnea Deb.

== Biography ==
Ida-Lova is a Swedish pop artist and songwriter. She made her breakthrough in 2017 when, at the age of 13, she performed the song "Utan dina andetag" by the rock group Kent at the Swedish Heroes Gala. Ida-Lova studied music at Viktor Rydberg Upper Secondary School.

"Utan dina andetag" was later released as a single. She has since released further songs, the latest of which, "Tunnelbanan (Vi tar det en annan dag)", was released in June 2023.

She participated in Melodifestivalen 2023 with the song "Låt hela stan se på", written by herself together with Andreas "Giri" Lindbergh, Joy and Linnea Deb.

Ida-Lova is the daughter of presenter, comedian and actress Christine Meltzer and her husband Niclas Lind.

== Discography ==
=== Albums ===
Title	Album details	Peak chart positions
Title	Album details	SWE
Livet kommer döda oss, vi lever det ändå	Released: 10 April 2026; Label: Playground; Formats: CD, LP, digital download, streaming	13

=== Singles ===
Title	Year	Peak chart positions		Album
Title	Year	SWE	NOR	Album
"Låt hela stan se på"	2023	43	—	Non-album singles
"Halvfullt sprucket glas"	2023	77	—	Non-album singles
"Svagare än jag"	2025	2	1	Livet kommer döda oss, vi lever det ändå
"Hej där mitt hjärta"	2025	— (Note: "Hej där mitt hjärta" did not enter the Swedish Singellista Chart, but peaked at number one on the Swedish Heatseeker Chart.)	—	Livet kommer döda oss, vi lever det ändå
"Klara"	2025	— (Note: "Klara" did not enter the Swedish Singellista Chart, but peaked at number seven on the Swedish Heatseeker Chart.)	—	Livet kommer döda oss, vi lever det ändå
"Mörka himlar"	2025	— (Note: "Mörka himlar" did not enter the Swedish Singellista Chart, but peaked at number five on the Swedish Heatseeker Chart.)	—	Livet kommer döda oss, vi lever det ändå
"Rockenrollen"	2026	78	—	Livet kommer döda oss, vi lever det ändå
"Packa alla vaskör Louise"	2026	86	—	Livet kommer döda oss, vi lever det ändå
