= On My Way (Panetoz song) =

Single by Panetoz
- Released: 25 February 2023
- Length: 3:06
- Label: PNTZ Vägen Ut HB
- Songwriter(s): Anders Wigelius; Daniel Nzinga; Jimmy Jansson; Nebeyu Baheru; Njol Badjie; Pa Modou Badjie; Robert Norberg

Panetoz singles chronology
"Backa på mig" (2019)	"On My Way" (2023)

"On My Way" is a song by Swedish band Panetoz, released as a single on 25 February 2023. It was performed in Melodifestivalen 2023.

== Charts ==
Chart performance for "On My Way"
Chart (2023)	Peak position
Sweden (Sverigetopplistan)	10
