= Sweden in the Eurovision Song Contest 2023 =

- Eurovision Song Contest 2023
- Participating broadcaster: Sveriges Television (SVT)
- Country: Sweden
- Selection process: Melodifestivalen 2023
- Selection date: 11 March 2023

Competing entry
- Song: "Tattoo"
- Artist: Loreen
- Songwriters: Jimmy "Joker" Thörnfeldt; Jimmy Jansson; Lorine Talhaoui; Moa Carlebecker; Peter Boström; Thomas G:son

Placement
- Semi-final result: Qualified (2nd, 135 points)
- Final result: 1st, 583 points

Participation chronology

Sweden was represented at the Eurovision Song Contest 2023 with the song "Tattoo", written by Jimmy "Joker" Thörnfeldt, Jimmy Jansson, Lorine Talhaoui, Moa Carlebecker, Peter Boström, and Thomas G:son, and performed by Talhaoui herself under her stage name Loreen. The Swedish participating broadcaster, Sveriges Television (SVT), organised Melodifestivalen 2023 in order to select its entry for the contest.

Sweden was drawn to compete in the first semi-final of the Eurovision Song Contest which took place on 9 May 2023. Performing during the show in position 11, "Tattoo" was announced among the top 10 entries of the first semi-final and therefore qualified to compete in the final on 14 May. It was later revealed that Sweden placed second out of the 15 participating countries in the semi-final with 135 points. In the final, Sweden performed in position 9 and placed first out of the 26 participating countries, winning the contest with 583 points.

This was Sweden's seventh win in the Eurovision Song Contest, having last won in 2015, therefore tying Ireland's record for the most victories in the contest. Loreen also became the second performer, after Ireland's Johnny Logan, and the first female artist to win the contest on more than one occasion.

== Background ==
Prior to the 2023 contest, Sveriges Radio (SR) until 1979, and Sveriges Television (SVT) since 1980, had participated in the Eurovision Song Contest representing Sweden sixty-one times since SR's first entry in 1958. Sweden had won the contest on six occasions: in 1974 with the song "Waterloo" performed by ABBA, in 1984 with the song "Diggi-Loo Diggi-Ley" performed by Herreys, in 1991 with the song "Fångad av en stormvind" performed by Carola, in 1999 with the song "Take Me to Your Heaven" performed by Charlotte Nilsson, in 2012 with the song "Euphoria" performed by Loreen, and in 2015 with the song "Heroes" performed by Måns Zelmerlöw. Following the introduction of semi-finals for the 2004 contest, Swedish entries, to this point, have featured in every final, except for 2010. This includes its 2022 entry, "Hold Me Closer" performed by Cornelia Jakobs, which finished in fourth place with 438 points.

As part of its duties as participating broadcaster, SVT organises the selection of its entry in the Eurovision Song Contest and broadcasts the event in the country. Since 1959, SR first and SVT later have organised the annual competition Melodifestivalen in order to select their entries for the contest.

== Before Eurovision ==
=== Melodifestivalen 2023 ===
The 2023 edition of Melodifestivalen featured four heats, a semi-final (replacing the previously held Second Chance round) and a final, and saw 28 acts compete. It was held between 4 February and 11 March 2023, concluding with a final held at the Friends Arena in Stockholm. After the cancellation of the traditional tour around six cities of the country (namely Malmö, Gothenburg, Linköping, Lidköping, Örnsköldsvik and Stockholm) for the previous edition due to the COVID-19 Omicron variant, SVT subsequently announced that the six cities would host the tour in 2023 instead, with new dates.

==== Heats and semi-final ====
- The first heat took place on 4 February 2023 at Scandinavium in Gothenburg. "Where You Are (Sávežan)" performed by Jon Henrik Fjällgren, Arc North feat. Adam Woods and "Rhythm of My Show" performed by Tone Sekelius qualified directly to the final, while "Diamonds" performed by Victor Crone and "Raggen går" performed by Elov & Beny advanced to the semi-final. "Haunted" performed by Rejhan, "Inga sorger" performed by Loulou Lamotte and "Länge leve livet" performed by Eva Rydberg & Ewa Roos were eliminated from the contest.
- The second heat took place on 11 February 2023 at the Saab Arena in Linköping. "Never Give Up" performed by Maria Sur and "On My Way" performed by Panetoz qualified directly to the final, while "Mer av dig" performed by Theoz and "Now I Know" performed by Tennessee Tears advanced to the semi-final. "All My Life (Where Have You Been)" performed by Wiktoria, "Grytan" performed by Uje Brandelius and "Comfortable" performed by Eden were eliminated from the contest.
- The third heat took place on 18 February 2023 at the Sparbanken Lidköping Arena in Lidköping. "Air" performed by Marcus & Martinus and "Royals" performed by Paul Rey qualified directly to the final, while "Släpp alla sorger" performed by Nordman and "For the Show" performed by Melanie Wehbe advanced to the semi-final. "Låt hela stan se på" performed by Ida-Lova, "Sober" performed by Laurell and "Så kommer känslorna tillbaka" performed by Casanovas were eliminated from the contest.
- The fourth heat took place on 25 February 2023 at the Malmö Arena in Malmö. "Tattoo" performed by Loreen and "Six Feet Under" performed by Smash Into Pieces qualified directly to the final, while "Where Did You Go" performed by Kiana and "One Day" performed by Mariette advanced to the semi-final. "Gorgeous" performed by Axel Schylström, "Edelweiss" performed by Signe & Hjördis and "Mera mera mera" performed by Emil Henrohn were eliminated from the contest.
- The semi-final took place on 4 March 2023 at the Hägglunds Arena in Örnsköldsvik. All of the songs competed against each other in a single semi-final, with the top four songs advancing to the final, similar to the preceding heats. "Släpp alla sorger" performed by Nordman, "Mer av dig" performed by Theoz, "Where Did You Go" performed by Kiana and "One Day" performed by Mariette qualified to the final, while "Now I Know" performed by Tennessee Tears, "Diamonds" performed by Victor Crone, "For the Show" performed by Melanie Wehbe and "Raggen går" performed by Elov & Beny were eliminated from the contest.

==== Final ====
The final took place on 11 March 2023 at the Friends Arena in Stockholm.

R/O	Artist	Song	Juries	Televote	Total	Place
1	Jon Henrik Fjällgren, Arc North feat. Adam Woods	"Where You Are (Sávežan)"	23	58	81	4
2	Tone Sekelius	"Rhythm of My Show"	15	5	20	12
3	Mariette	"One Day"	35	16	51	8
4	Marcus & Martinus	"Air"	71	67	138	2
5	Panetoz	"On My Way"	22	25	47	10
6	Maria Sur	"Never Give Up"	10	37	47	9
7	Smash Into Pieces	"Six Feet Under"	53	59	112	3
8	Kiana	"Where Did You Go"	37	39	76	6
9	Nordman	"Släpp alla sorger"	8	36	44	11
10	Loreen	"Tattoo"	92	85	177	1
11	Theoz	"Mer av dig"	42	36	78	5
12	Paul Rey	"Royals"	56	1	57	7

== At Eurovision ==
According to Eurovision rules, all nations with the exceptions of the host country and the "Big Five" (France, Germany, Italy, Spain and the United Kingdom) are required to qualify from one of two semi-finals in order to compete for the final; the top ten countries from each semi-final progress to the final. The European Broadcasting Union (EBU) split up the competing countries into six different pots based on voting patterns from previous contests, with countries with favourable voting histories put into the same pot. On 31 January 2023, an allocation draw was held, which placed each country into one of the two semi-finals, and determined which half of the show they would perform in. Sweden has been placed into the first semi-final, to be held on 9 May 2023, and has been scheduled to perform in the second half of the show.

Once all the competing songs for the 2023 contest had been released, the running order for the semi-finals was decided by the shows' producers rather than through another draw, so that similar songs were not placed next to each other. Sweden was set to perform in position 11, following the entry from Moldova and before the entry from Azerbaijan.

At the end of the show, Sweden was announced as a qualifier for the final.

=== Voting ===
==== Points awarded to Sweden ====
Points awarded to Sweden (Semi-final 1)
Score	Televote
12 points	Malta; Netherlands
10 points	Azerbaijan; Latvia; Norway; Moldova
8 points	Ireland; Portugal; Switzerland
7 points	Israel; Rest of the World
6 points	Czech Republic; Serbia
5 points	Finland; France
4 points	Croatia; Germany
3 points	Italy
2 points	
1 point	

Points awarded to Sweden (Final)
Score	Televote	Jury
12 points		Albania; Cyprus; Denmark; Estonia; Finland; Germany; Ireland; Israel; Lithuania; Malta; Moldova; Netherlands; Spain; Ukraine; United Kingdom
10 points	Albania; Australia; Azerbaijan; Belgium; Estonia; Iceland; Malta; Norway	Armenia; Austria; Azerbaijan; Croatia; Czech Republic; Latvia; Norway; Romania
8 points	Cyprus; Denmark; Greece; Latvia; Moldova; Netherlands; Romania; San Marino	Belgium; Italy
7 points	Armenia; Georgia; Lithuania; Poland; Portugal; Rest of the World	Australia; Iceland; Poland; Slovenia
6 points	Czech Republic; Ireland; Serbia	France; Greece; Switzerland
5 points	Spain; Switzerland; United Kingdom	Portugal; Serbia
4 points	Austria; Israel; Slovenia	Georgia; San Marino
3 points	France; Italy; Ukraine	
2 points	Croatia	
1 point	Germany	

==== Points awarded by Sweden ====
Points awarded by Sweden (Semi-final)
Score	Televote
12 points	Finland
10 points	Norway
8 points	Switzerland
7 points	Czech Republic
6 points	Moldova
5 points	Croatia
4 points	Portugal
3 points	Israel
2 points	Netherlands
1 point	Serbia

Points awarded by Sweden (Final)
Score	Televote	Jury
12 points	Finland	Finland
10 points	Norway	France
8 points	Switzerland	Norway
7 points	Belgium	Italy
6 points	Italy	Switzerland
5 points	Croatia	Israel
4 points	Ukraine	United Kingdom
3 points	Czech Republic	Czech Republic
2 points	France	Estonia
1 point	Australia	Cyprus

==== Detailed voting results ====
The following members comprised the Swedish jury:

- Fredrik Kempe
- Robert Sehlberg
- Arantxa Alvarez
- Clara Klingenström
- Isa Molin

Detailed voting results from Sweden (Semi-final 1)
R/O	Country	Televote	
R/O	Country	Rank	Points
01	Norway	2	10
02	Malta	13	
03	Serbia	10	1
04	Latvia	12	
05	Portugal	7	4
06	Ireland	11	
07	Croatia	6	5
08	Switzerland	3	8
09	Israel	8	3
10	Moldova	5	6
11	Sweden		
12	Azerbaijan	14	
13	Czech Republic	4	7
14	Netherlands	9	2
15	Finland	1	12

Detailed voting results from Sweden (Final)
R/O	Country	Jury							Televote	
R/O	Country	Juror 1	Juror 2	Juror 3	Juror 4	Juror 5	Rank	Points	Rank	Points
01	Austria	9	23	21	19	14	20		21	
02	Portugal	13	20	18	21	16	22		23	
03	Switzerland	5	8	2	8	9	5	6	3	8
04	Poland	21	25	9	22	12	19		11	
05	Serbia	23	9	22	24	23	21		14	
06	France	1	13	10	1	2	2	10	9	2
07	Cyprus	15	10	4	9	11	10	1	12	
08	Spain	14	17	17	11	10	16		25	
09	Sweden									
10	Albania	25	14	24	23	25	25		16	
11	Italy	3	16	1	6	4	4	7	5	6
12	Estonia	16	12	5	4	24	9	2	15	
13	Finland	2	1	3	3	1	1	12	1	12
14	Czech Republic	10	11	12	2	21	8	3	8	3
15	Australia	11	15	8	14	17	14		10	1
16	Belgium	18	2	23	13	13	12		4	7
17	Armenia	12	24	7	7	19	13		22	
18	Moldova	6	5	14	10	22	11		13	
19	Ukraine	17	19	13	18	7	15		7	4
20	Norway	4	3	6	5	3	3	8	2	10
21	Germany	20	22	20	17	15	23		20	
22	Lithuania	22	21	19	15	18	24		18	
23	Israel	7	4	11	20	8	6	5	17	
24	Slovenia	19	7	16	16	20	17		19	
25	Croatia	24	18	25	25	6	18		6	5
26	United Kingdom	8	6	15	12	5	7	4	24	
