= The Missing Piece (song) =

Single by Paul Rey
- Released: 6 February 2021
- Length: 3:01
- Label: 20/20; Warner
- Songwriters: Pauli Jokela; Fredrik Sonefors; Laurell Barker
- Producers: Fredrik Sonefors; Gabriel Runemark; Paul Rey; Theo Kylin

Paul Rey singles chronology
"Richest Man Alive" (2020)	"The Missing Piece" (2021)	"Royals" (2023)

"The Missing Piece" is a song by Swedish singer and songwriter Paul Rey. The song was released on 6 February 2021 through 20/20 Records and Warner Music Sweden. It was written by Paul Rey, Fredrik Sonefors and Laurell Barker, produced by Sonefors, Rey, Gabriel Runemark, and Theo Kylin.

It was performed for the first time in Melodifestivalen 2021 and made it to the Second Chance round.

== Background and composition ==
Rey called the song as a journey and described that the track started "intimately and steadily grew". In an interview with escXtra, Rey revealed that "The Missing Piece" was dedicated to his daughter.

== Reception ==
Reviewing the first semi-final of Melodifestivalen 2021, William Lee Adams of Wiwibloggs praised the simplicity of the performance and called it "powerful, tender and sweet". In comparison to Rey's Melodifestivalen 2020 entry "Talking in My Sleep", Tim Jumawan of escXtra felt his growth and a more intimate feel than the former, while Dominik Rössing called "The Missing Piece" was "stronger".

== Charts ==
Chart performance for "The Missing Piece"
Chart (2021)	Peak position
Sweden (Sverigetopplistan)	18
