= Mittådalen =

Coordinates: 62.692°N 12.672°E

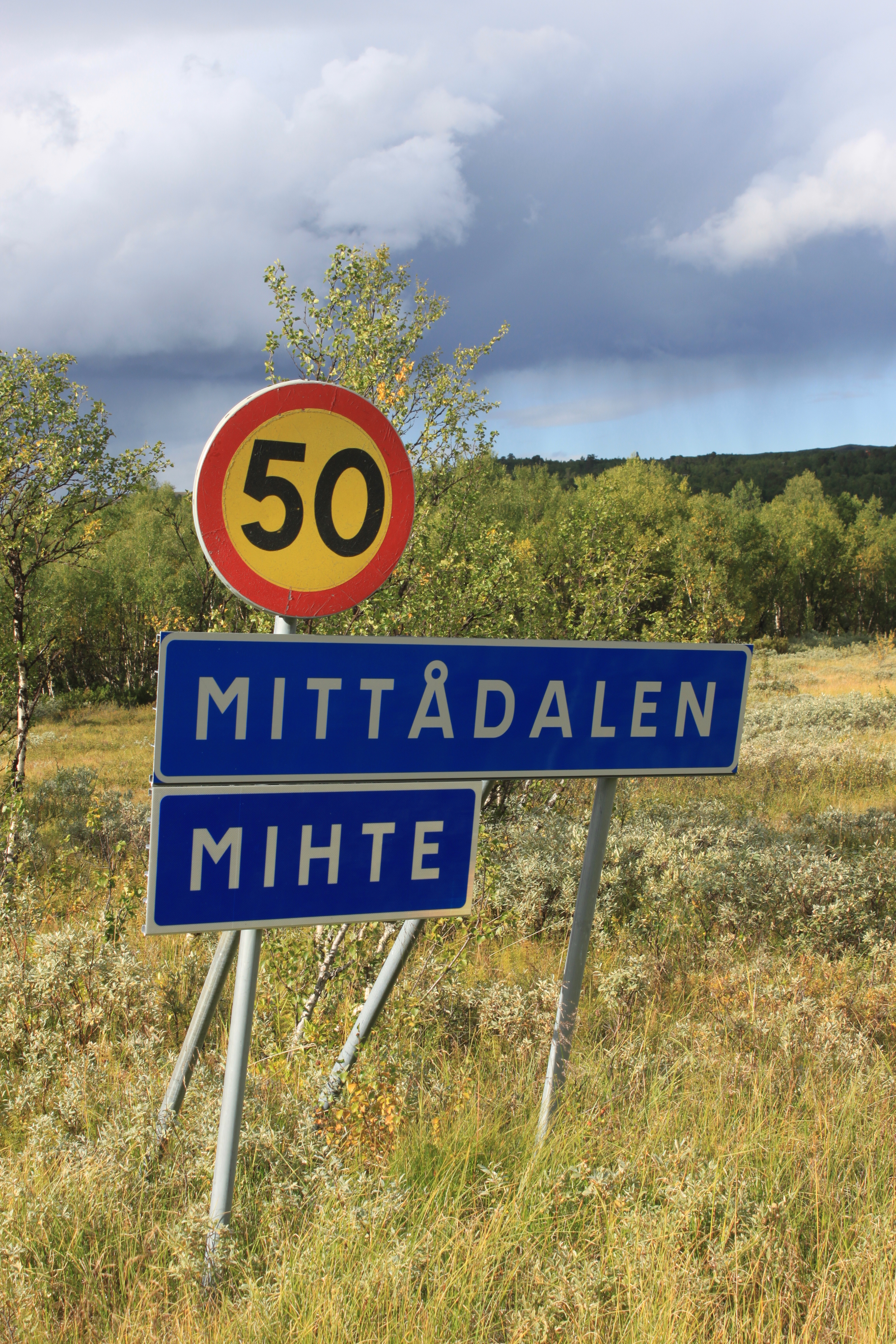
Roadsign at Mittådalen. Both in Swedish and Sami (2013)

Mittådalen also known as Mittådalens sameby (south-sami: Mïhte), is a Sami village in the north west part of Härjedalen, Sweden. It is located between Ljusnedal Härjedalens kommun and Storsjö in Bergs kommun. Mittådalen is one of Sweden's 51 Sami villages. A Sami village is partly a geographical area, and partly an economic area for reindeer working Sami people within the area. Flatruet lies nearby.

Singer Jon Henrik Fjällgren lives in Mittådalen.

== Gallery ==
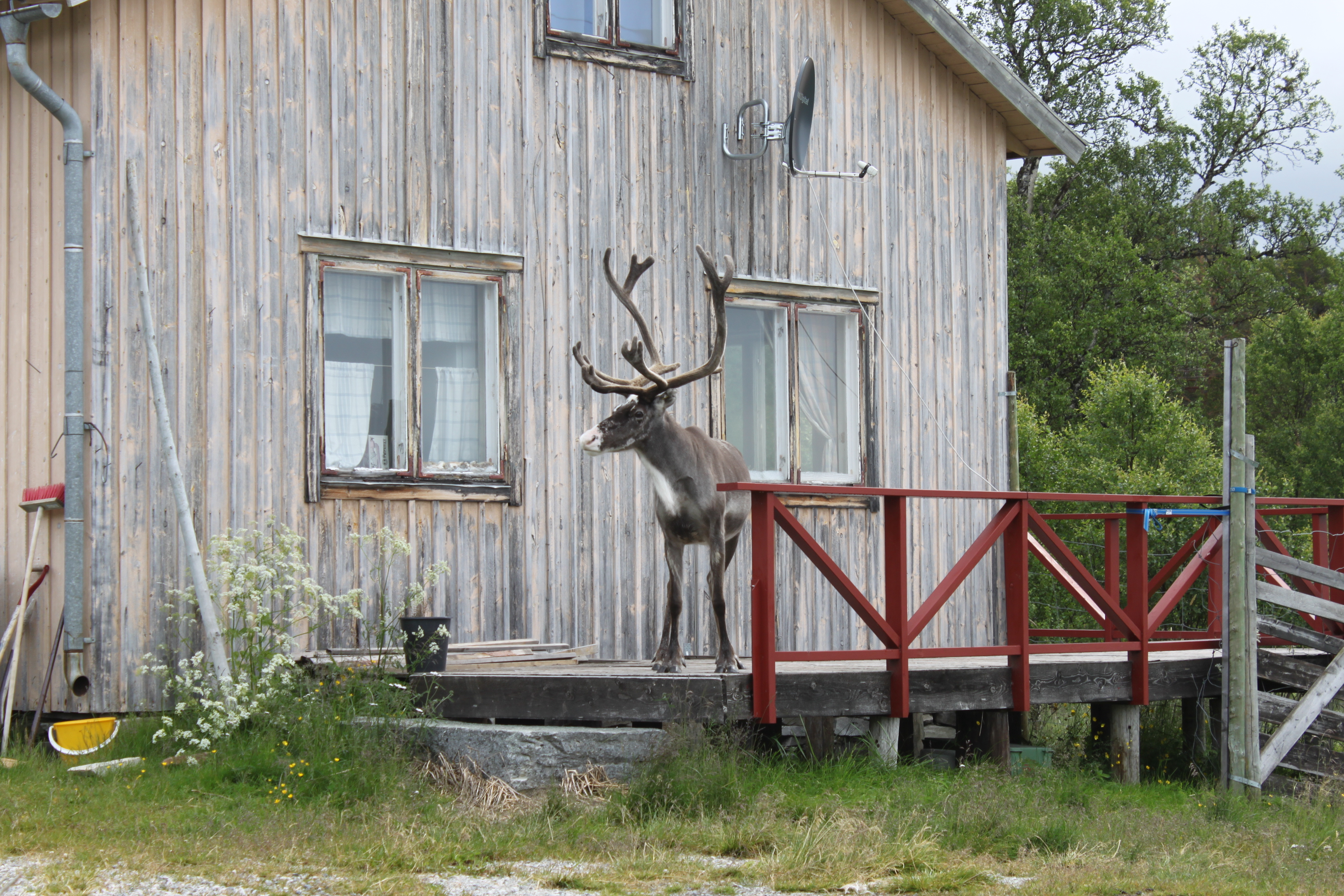
Reindeer on porch at a house in Mittådalen.

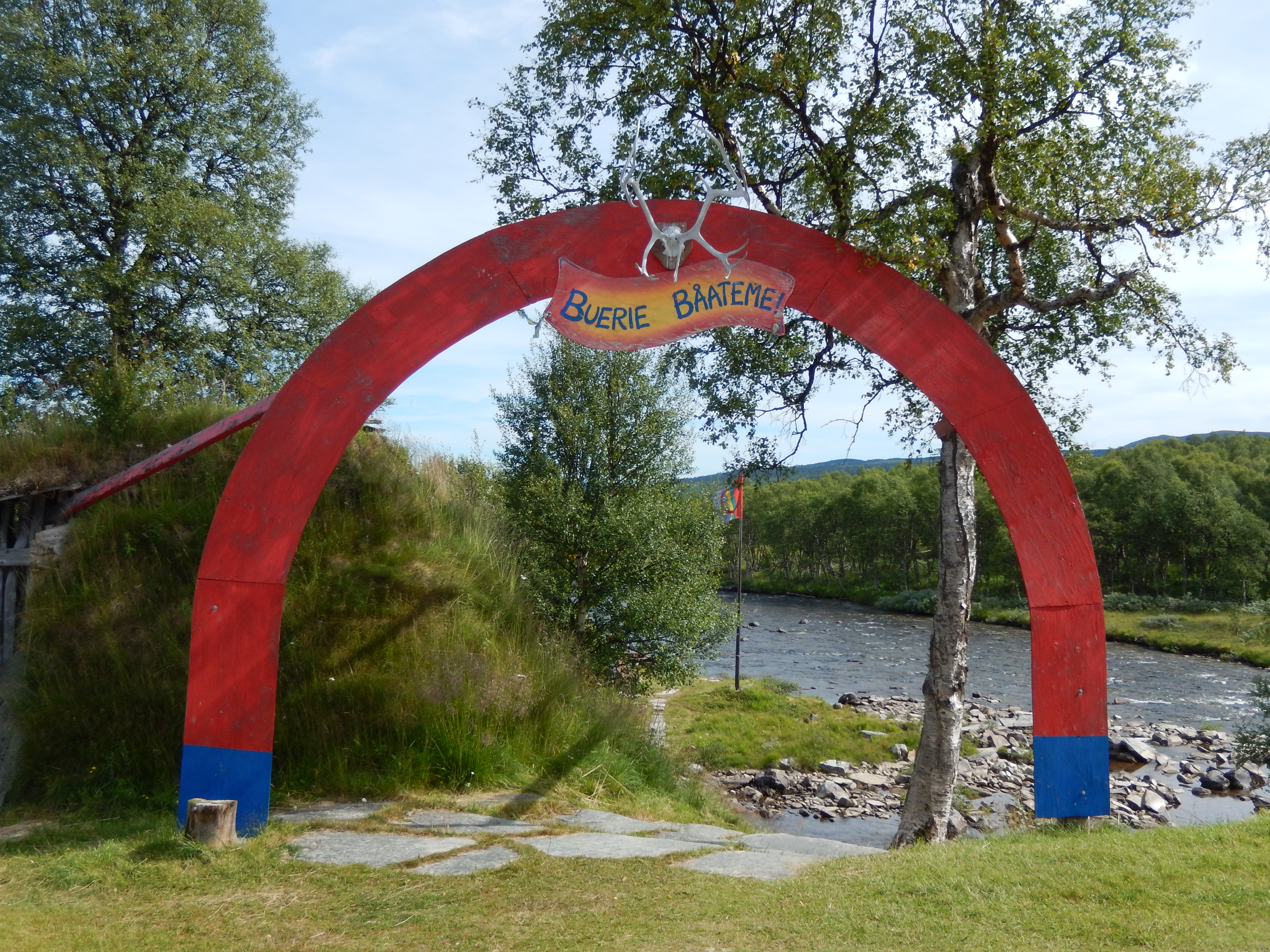
Arch in Mittådalen by the handicraft shop.

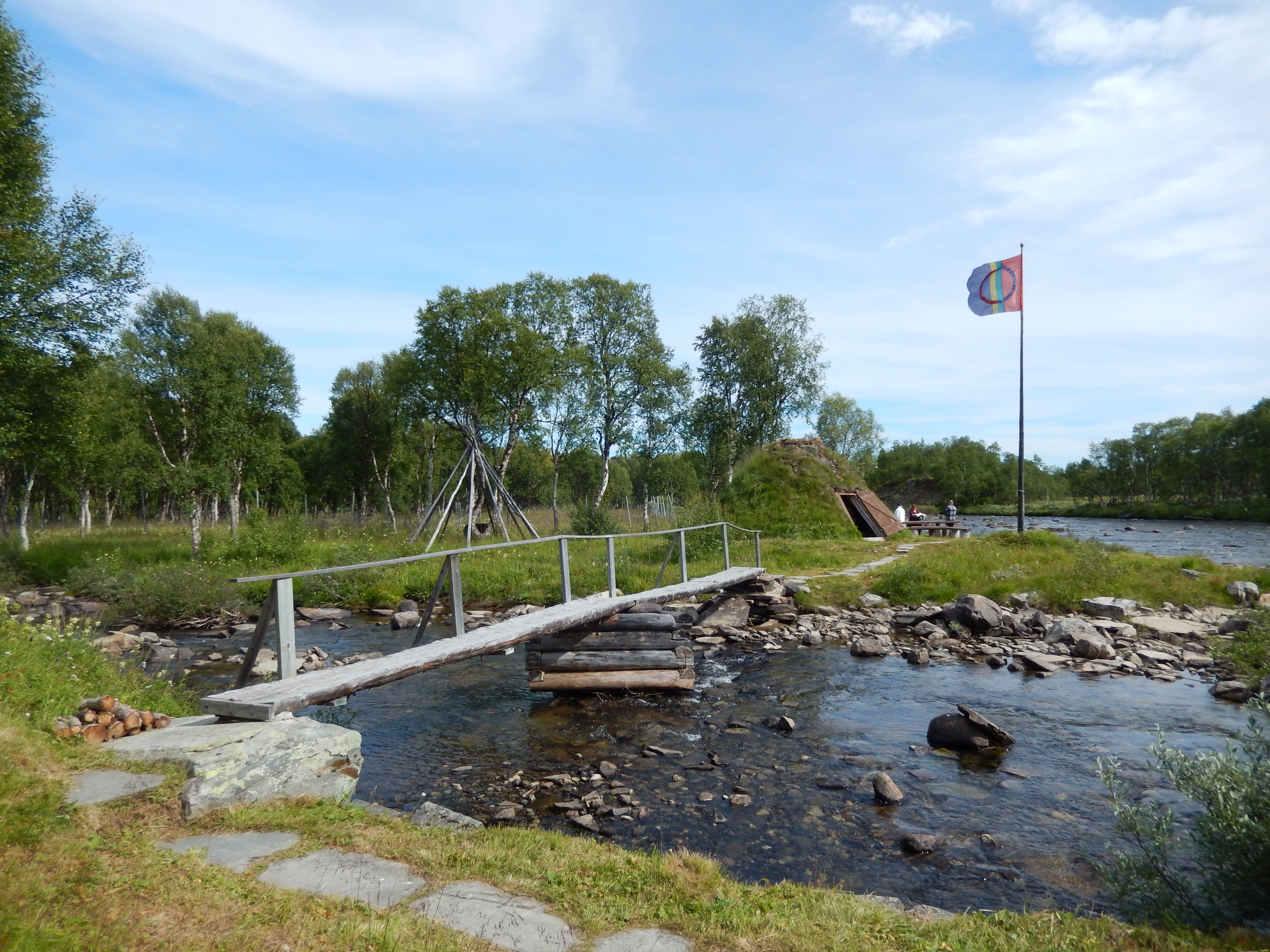
Goahti and flag in Mittådalen by the stream Mittån.

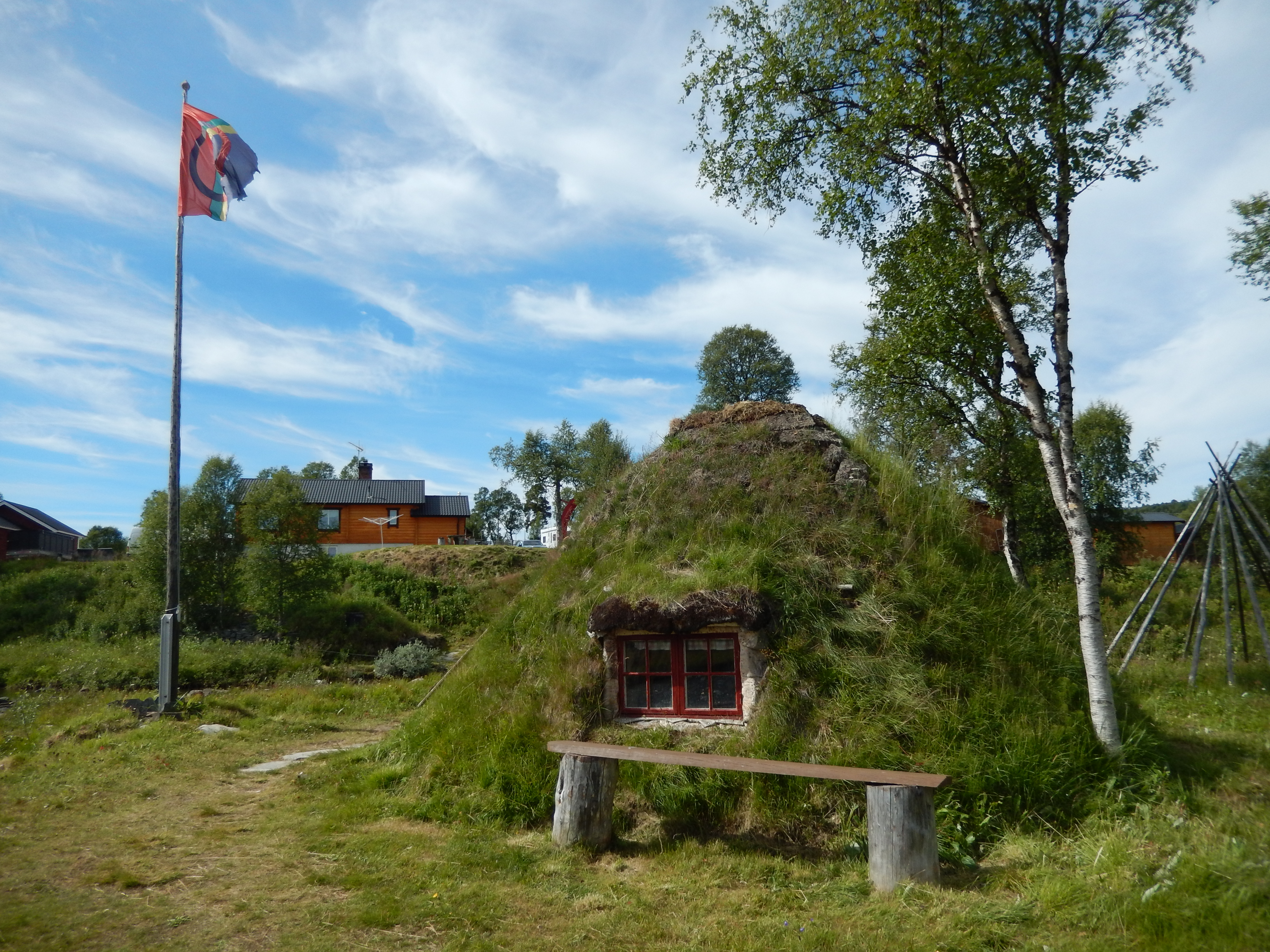
Goahti and flag in Mittådalen by the stream Mittån.
