= Goeksegh =

2014 studio album by Jon Henrik Fjällgren

Studio album by Jon Henrik Fjällgren
- Released: 19 May 2014
- Recorded: 2014
- Genre: Joik
- Label: Sony Music

Jon Henrik Fjällgren chronology
Goeksegh (2014)	Goeksegh - Jag är fri (2014)

Goeksegh is a 2014 album by Jon Henrik Fjällgren, his debut studio album on Sony Music after winning Talang Sverige 2014. The album reached number six on the Swedish Albums Chart.

== Track listing ==
1. "Daniel's Joik" (6:31)
2. "The Reindeer Herder's Joik" (5:57)
3. "Utøya" (7:57)
4. "The Wolf" (5:41)
5. "My Twin" (4:31)
6. "My Home Is My Heart" (5:21)
7. "I'm Sorry" (5:17)
8. "Nejla's Joik" (4:22)
9. "Father's Joik" (2:08)
10. "My First Love" (4:15)
11. "Your Song' (5:45)

== Goeksegh - Jag är fri ==
Goeksegh -Jag är fri

Studio album by Jon Henrik Fjällgren
- Released: 28 February 2015
- Recorded: 2014
- Genre: Joik
- Label: Sony Music

Jon Henrik Fjällgren chronology
Goeksegh (2014)	Goeksegh -Jag är fri (2015)

In 2015, when Jon Henrik Fjällgren took part in Melodifestivalen 2015 in a bid to represent Sweden in Eurovision Song Contest 2015, the album was rereleased as Goeksegh (Jag är fri)). It opened with the track "Jag är fri", his Melodifestivalen entry, followed by the original 11 tracks of Goeksegh. The album reached number 2 on Sverigetopplistan, the official Swedish Albums Chart.

The title track Jag är fri (Manne leam frijje) was used in Stockholm's bid film for the 2026 Olympic and Paralympic Winter Games.

Track list

1. "Jag Är Fri" (3:00)
2. "Daniel's Joik" (6:31)
3. "The Reindeer Herder's Joik" (5:57)
4. "Utøya" (7:57)
5. "The Wolf" (5:41)
6. "My Twin" (4:31)
7. "My Home Is My Heart" (5:21)
8. "I'm Sorry" (5:17)
9. "Nejla's Joik" (4:22)
10. "Father's Joik" (2:08)
11. "My First Love" (4:15)
12. "Your Song' (5:45)

== Charts ==
=== Weekly charts ===
Goeksegh

Chart (2014)	Peak position
Swedish Albums (Sverigetopplistan)	6

Goeksegh - Jag är fri

Chart (2015)	Peak position
Swedish Albums (Sverigetopplistan)	1

=== Year-end charts ===
Goeksegh

Chart (2014)	Position
Swedish Albums (Sverigetopplistan)	62

Goeksegh - Jag är fri

Chart (2015)	Position
Swedish Albums (Sverigetopplistan)	26
