= Royals (Paul Rey song) =

Single by Paul Rey
- Released: 25 February 2023
- Length: 2:58
- Label: 20/20
- Songwriter(s): Dino Medanhodzic; Jimmy "Joker" Thörnfeldt; Liamoo; Paul Rey
- Producer(s): Dino Medanhodzic; Jimmy "Joker" Thörnfeldt

Paul Rey singles chronology
"The Missing Piece" (2021)	"Royals" (2023)

"Royals" is a song by singer Paul Rey, released as a single on 25 February 2023. It was performed in Melodifestivalen 2023.

== Track listing ==
Digital single
No.	Title	Length
1.	"Royals"	2:58
2.	"Talking in My Sleep"	2:58
3.	"The Missing Piece"	3:01
Total length:		8:57

== Charts ==
Chart performance for "Royals"
Chart (2023)	Peak position
Sweden (Sverigetopplistan)	23
