= When I'm Gone (Maria Sur song) =

Single by Maria Sur
- Released: 2 March 2024
- Length: 3:05
- Label: Warner Music Sweden
- Songwriters: Anderz Wrethov; Jimmy "Joker" Thörnfeldt; Julie "Kill J" Aagaard; Maria Sur

Maria Sur singles chronology
"Never Give Up" (2023)	"When I'm Gone" (2024)

"When I'm Gone" is a song by Ukrainian singer Maria Sur, released as a single on 2 March 2024. It was performed in Melodifestivalen 2024. The song came second in the second heat of the show, directly qualifying for the final. In the final, the song placed seventh, scoring 37 points from international juries, 35 points from the televote, totalling 72 points overall, despite being a favourite amongst the fandom.

== Charts ==
Chart performance for "When I'm Gone"
Chart (2024)	Peak position
Sweden (Sverigetopplistan)	12
