= Jag är fri (Manne leam frijje) =

2015 song performed by Jon Henrik Fjällgren

Song by Jon Henrik Fjällgren

from the album Goeksegh - Jag är fri
- Released: 2015
- Recorded: 2014
- Songwriter(s): Jon Henrik Fjällgren; Erik Holmberg; Tony Malm; Josef Melin

"Jag är fri (Manne leam frijje)"

Single by Jon Henrik Fjällgren
- Released: 2015
- Recorded: 2014
- Genre: Joik
- Songwriter(s): Jon Henrik Fjällgren; Erik Holmberg; Tony Malm; Josef Melin

Jon Henrik Fjällgren singles chronology
"Daniel's Joik" (2014)	"Jag är fri (Manne leam frijje)" (2015)

"Jag är fri" (English: I am free) is a joik song performed by Jon Henrik Fjällgren appearing on his album Goeksegh - Jag är fri. The song was co-written by Jon Henrik Fjällgren, Erik Holmberg, Tony Malm and Josef Melin. The 2015 album Goeksegh - Jag är fri was a rerelease of Fjällgren's album Goeksegh on occasion of him taking part in Melodifestivalen 2015 in a bid to represent Sweden in the Eurovision Song Contest 2015 in Vienna, Austria. Goeksegh - Jag är fri is a 12-track album opening with "Jag är fri" (meaning 'I am free' in Swedish), with the remaining 11 tracks being taken from the Goeksegh in the same sequence.

Jon Henrik Fjällgren, is a Swedish-Sami singer and of Colombian origin who was adopted by a Sami family at a very young age. He was the winner of the Swedish Talang Sverige 2014 competition broadcast on TV3.

Fjällgren took part in Melodifestivalen 2015 with the song. For Melodifestivalen purposes, the song was retitled as "Jag är fri (Manne leam frijje)" The song is just a joik melody and has no main lyrics, although the chorus sings some sparse lines in Swedish interspersed in the joik sung by Fjällgren.

At Melodifestivalen 2015, Fjällgren performed in the third semi-final on 21 February 2015 held in Östersund finishing in first place and qualifying directly to the final on 14 March in Stockholm's Friends Arena. In the final the song placed second after the winning song "Heroes" performed by Måns Zelmerlöw.

The song was used in Stockholm/Åre's bid film for the 2026 Olympic and Paralympic Winter Games.

== Charts ==
Chart (2015)	Peak position
Sweden (Sverigetopplistan)	8
