= Flatruet =

Fell in Härjedalen, Sweden

Coordinates: 62°38′18″N 12°39′04″E

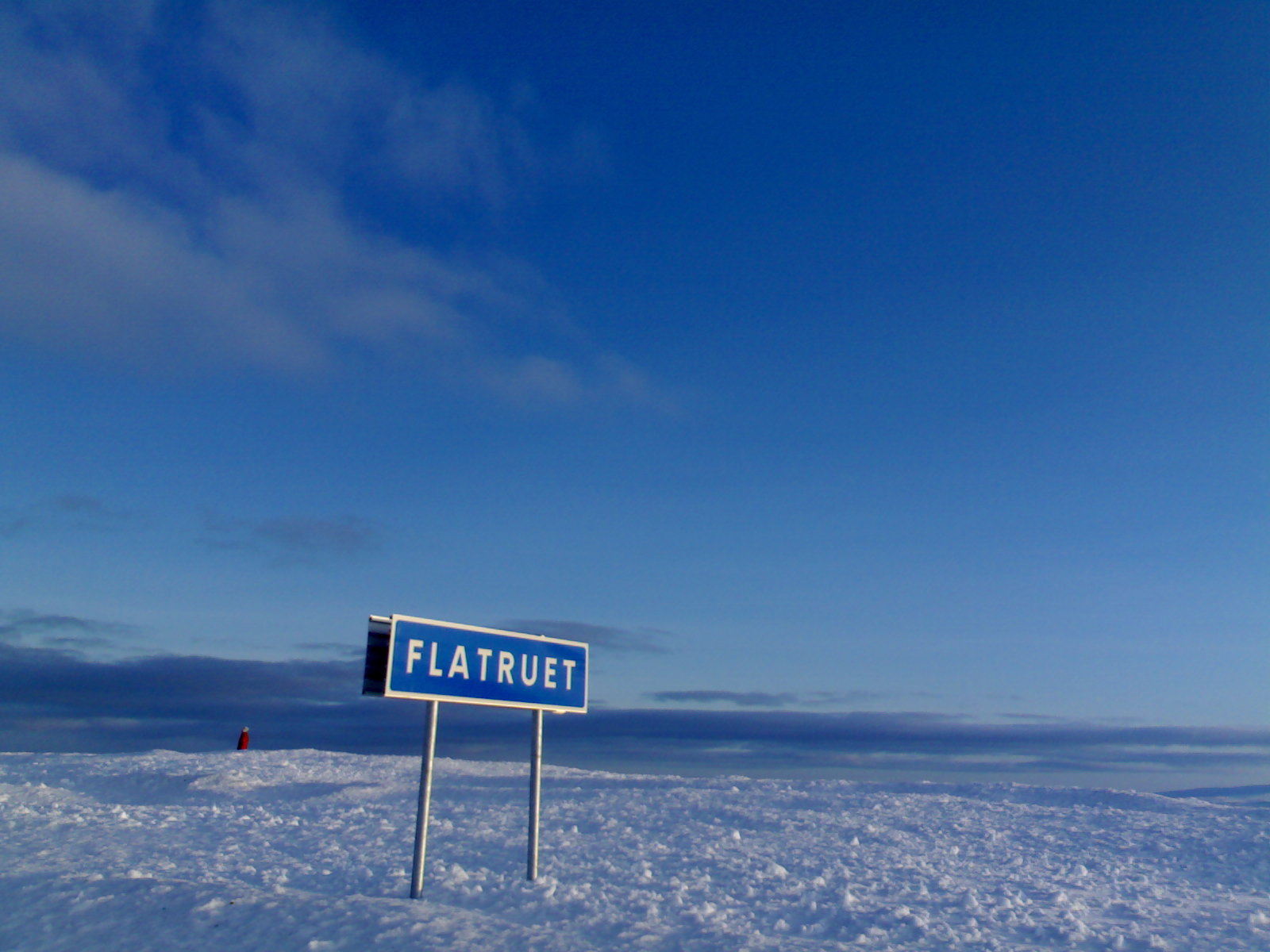
Roadsign at Flatruet

Flatruet (Swedish pronunciation: [ˈflɑ̂ːtˌrʉːɛt]) is a fell in north western Härjedalen, Sweden, between Mittådalen in Härjedalen Municipality and Ljungdalen. Flatruet comprises many ravines dating back to the end of the ice age. The ravines were formed when the ice lake in the Messlingen valley area burst and rushed down into the valley below. The majority of the ravines reside on the south side of Flatruet.

Evagraven is probably the most famous ravine of Flatruet and is located 2 kilometers west of Ruänden's rock art. An old Swedish legend says that a lady named Eva died in the ravine during a snowstorm, which is how the ravine got its name. Evagraven is so deep that the snow on the ravine's floor doesn't melt, even in the summer.

Fiskhålsgraven is located 2 kilometers west of Evagraven. Fiskhålsgraven translates to "fish hole ravine" because at the small tarn at the end of the ravine, rare and protected dwarf char reside. The only other place in the world where the dwarf char can be found is in a small tarn in a ravine on the Blåstöten mountain.

Ruänden which is a part of Flatruet is one of Sweden's largest areas with rock art. The rock art at Ruänden consists of about twenty figures looking like humans, bears, moose and a reindeer. The rock art was first reported in 1896 and have been dated to 4000 years ago.

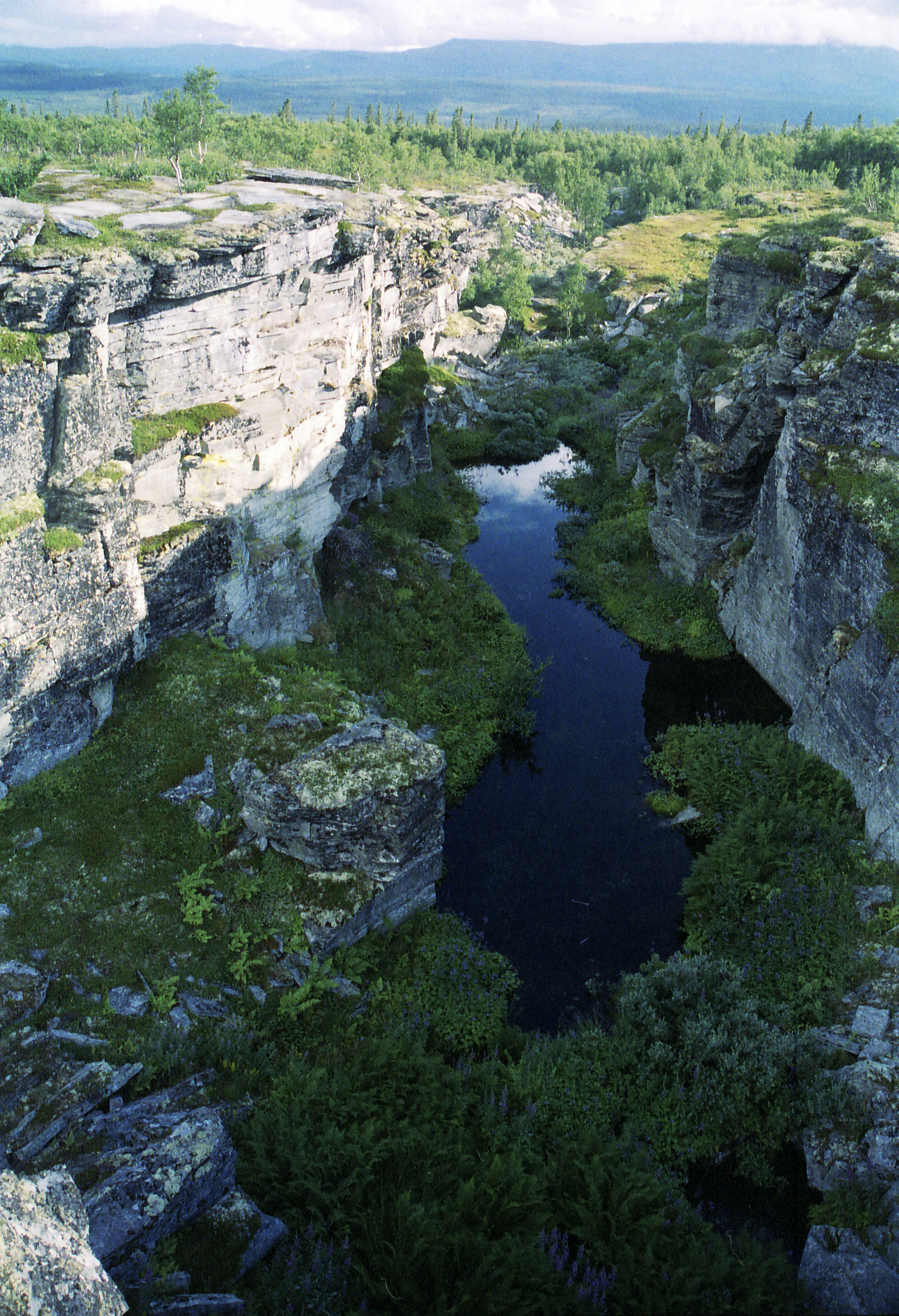
Ruändan

== Climate ==
Climate data for Flatruet V 1991-2020 (932m)
Month	Jan	Feb	Mar	Apr	May	Jun	Jul	Aug	Sep	Oct	Nov	Dec	Year
Mean daily maximum °C (°F)	−4.9 (23.2)	−5.2 (22.6)	−3.0 (26.6)	1.3 (34.3)	6.6 (43.9)	12.0 (53.6)	15.1 (59.2)	13.5 (56.3)	8.8 (47.8)	2.4 (36.3)	−2.1 (28.2)	−4.2 (24.4)	3.4 (38.0)
Daily mean °C (°F)	−7.5 (18.5)	−7.7 (18.1)	−5.7 (21.7)	−1.7 (28.9)	3.1 (37.6)	8.0 (46.4)	11.1 (52.0)	9.6 (49.3)	5.4 (41.7)	−0.1 (31.8)	−4.3 (24.3)	−6.7 (19.9)	0.3 (32.5)
Mean daily minimum °C (°F)	−10.4 (13.3)	−10.9 (12.4)	−9.0 (15.8)	−5.0 (23.0)	−0.5 (31.1)	4.1 (39.4)	7.3 (45.1)	6.4 (43.5)	2.7 (36.9)	−2.2 (28.0)	−6.7 (19.9)	−9.4 (15.1)	−2.8 (27.0)
Source: NOAA
