= Never Give Up (Maria Sur song) =

Single by Maria Sur
- Released: 25 February 2023
- Length: 2:55
- Label: Giant
- Songwriters: Anderz Wrethov; Laurell Barker
- Producers: Anderz Wrethov; Isac Halldin

Maria Sur singles chronology
"Never Give Up" (2023)	"When I'm Gone" (2024)

"Never Give Up" is a song by Ukrainian singer Maria Sur, released as a single on 25 February 2023. It was performed in Melodifestivalen 2023.

== Charts ==
Chart performance for "Never Give Up"
Chart (2023)	Peak position
Sweden (Sverigetopplistan)	17
