= Where You Are (Sávežan) =

Single by Jon Henrik Fjällgren and Arc North featuring Adam Woods
- Released: 25 February 2023
- Length: 2:57
- Label: LoudKult
- Songwriter(s): Arc North; Calle Hellberg; Jon Henrik Fjällgren; Joy Deb; Oliver Belvelin; Richard Lästh; Tobias Lundgren; William Segerdahl

Jon Henrik Fjällgren singles chronology
"The Avatar" (2020)	"Where You Are (Sávežan)" (2023)

"Where You Are (Sávežan)" is a song by Jon Henrik Fjällgren and Arc North featuring Adam Woods, released as a single on 25 February 2023. It was performed in Melodifestivalen 2023.

== Charts ==
Chart performance for "Where You Are (Sávežan)"
Chart (2023)	Peak position
Sweden (Sverigetopplistan)	6
