= Adam Woods =

Swedish singer (born 2001)

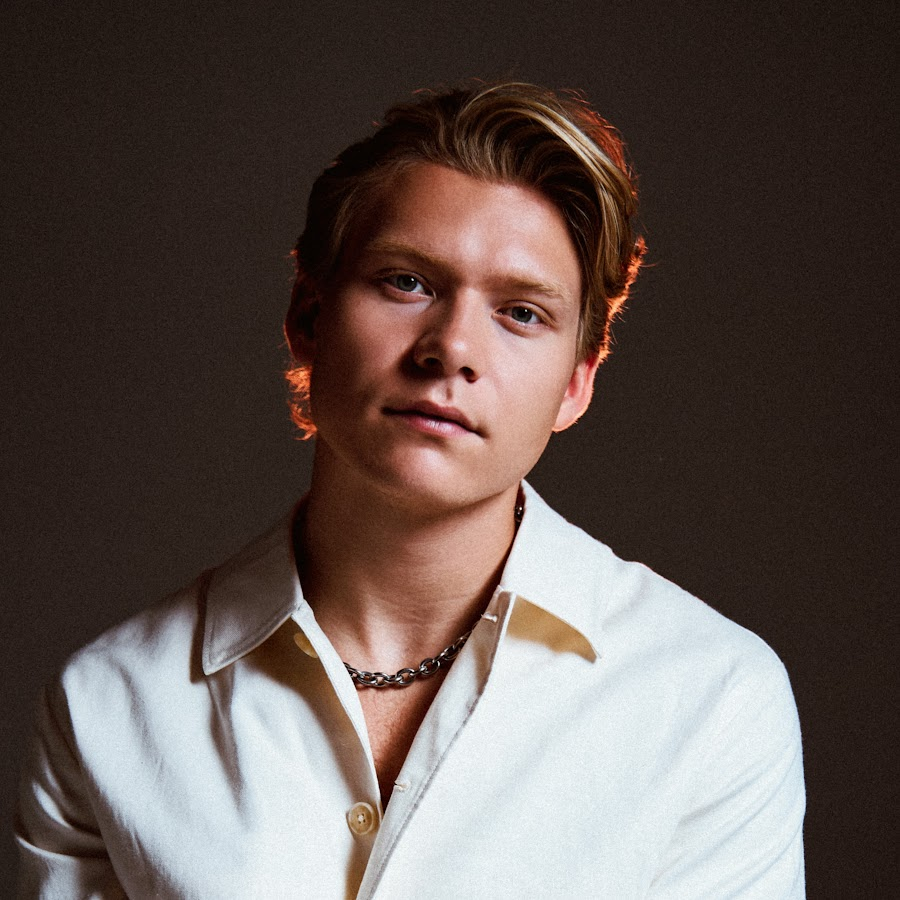
- Woods in 2025

Background information
- Born: Adam Christopher Allskog; 14 March 2001 (age 25)
- Origin: Resarö, Sweden
- Occupations: Singer; songwriter; producer
- Years active: 2020–present

Adam Christopher Allskog (born 14 March 2001), known professionally as Adam Woods, is a Swedish singer, songwriter, and producer. He first gained attention in Sweden through music competitions and television appearances.

== Early life ==
Woods grew up in the Resarö area of Vaxholm Municipality outside Stockholm. During his early music career, he auditioned for the Swedish television talent show Idol in 2018 and 2019, and qualified for the final stage of the 2019 audition.

== Career ==
=== Melodifestivalen ===
In 2023, Woods competed in the Swedish music competition Melodifestivalen 2023 as a featured vocalist on the song "Where You Are (Sávežan)" alongside Jon Henrik Fjällgren and Arc North, where they qualified directly for the final from the first heat in Gothenburg held on 4 February and finished in fourth place in the final on 11 March.

Woods competed in Melodifestivalen 2024 for the first time as a solo artist with the song "Supernatural". He co-wrote the song with Calle Hellberg, Jonna Hall and William Segerdahl. The song advanced from the first semi-final in Malmö to the finalkval (final qualification round) in Karlstad but did not make the final competition.

=== Songwriting and production ===
Outside performing, he has written and produced for other artists. He co-wrote the song "Lighter" for Norwegian singer Kyle Alessandro, which was released in January 2025. "Lighter" won Norway’s national selection Melodi Grand Prix 2025 and was selected as Norway’s entry for the Eurovision Song Contest 2025 in Basel, where Alessandro performed the song in the grand final.

=== Album and singles ===
Woods has also pursued a solo career. In June 2025, Woods released his first solo single "Okay", which Culture Fix described as a "feel-good" summer pop anthem, and which was accompanied by his first widely covered music video. "Summer's Over" followed later in 2025, a reflective pop song which preceded Woods' debut album. Other solo songs released during this period include "On My Way", "Little Things", "Cold as Ice" and the dance-pop song "Hot Air Balloon".

"Hot Air Balloon" was released in late October 2025, as part of a stunt‑driven music video in which Woods performed a bungee jump from about 1,500 metres above Västerås, riding on top of a hot-air balloon on a small platform. This high-flying stunt received coverage from Swedish media outlets including TV4, Aftonbladet, Expressen and Västerås Tidning.

On 9 January 2026, Woods released his debut studio album Little Things through LoudKult. This nine-track album includes his prior singles "Okay", "Little Things", and "Summer's Over", along with newly released tracks. UK publication Culture Fix described Little Things as a "stellar debut album", noting Woods's melodic dance‑pop sound and praising the lyrics to "Little Things", "Summer's Over", and "Okay".

=== Fröken Snusk collaboration ===
In April 2025, Woods announced that he would not release a planned collaboration with the Swedish drag act Fröken Snusk. The cancellation came after a dispute between the original performer behind Fröken Snusk and the musician Rasmus Gozzi. After media reports that a new person might perform under the stage name, Woods said he would not release the track, explaining that he wrote it for a friend and expressing support for the original performer behind Fröken Snusk. The dispute was covered by Swedish media.

== Personal life ==
Woods is currently in a relationship with Swedish TikTok star Märtha Rasch. He is also active on TikTok, where he had approximately 76,000 followers in 2025 according to the Swedish magazine Hänt.

== Discography ==
=== Studio albums ===
Studio albums
Title	Details
Little Things	Released: 9 January 2026; Label: LoudKult; Format: Digital download, streaming

=== Singles ===
==== Charted singles ====
Charted singles
Title	Year	Peak chart positions	Album
"Where You Are (Sávežan)" (Jon Henrik Fjällgren featuring Arc North and Adam Woods)	2023	SWE: 6	Non-album single
"Supernatural"	2024	SWE: 41	Non-album single

==== Other singles ====
Other singles
Title	Year	Notes
"Weekend"	2024	Released as a standalone single.
"Cry"	2024	Released as a standalone single.
"On My Way"	2024	Released through LoudKult.
"Cold As Ice"	2025	Released through LoudKult.
"Okay"	2025	Lead single from Little Things.
"Little Things"	2025	Released ahead of the album of the same name.
"Summer's Over"	2025	Released as a standalone single.
"Hot Air Balloon"	2025	Released alongside a stunt-driven music video.

=== Featured appearances ===
Featured appearances
Title	Artist(s)	Year	Notes
"Where You Are (Sávežan)"	Jon Henrik Fjällgren and Arc North	2023	Featured vocalist.
"What You Do To Me"	Lucas Estrada and Madism	2023	Featured artist.
"Moonlight"	Lucas Estrada	2023	Featured artist.
