= Jon Henrik Fjällgren =

Swedish-Sámi singer (born 1987)

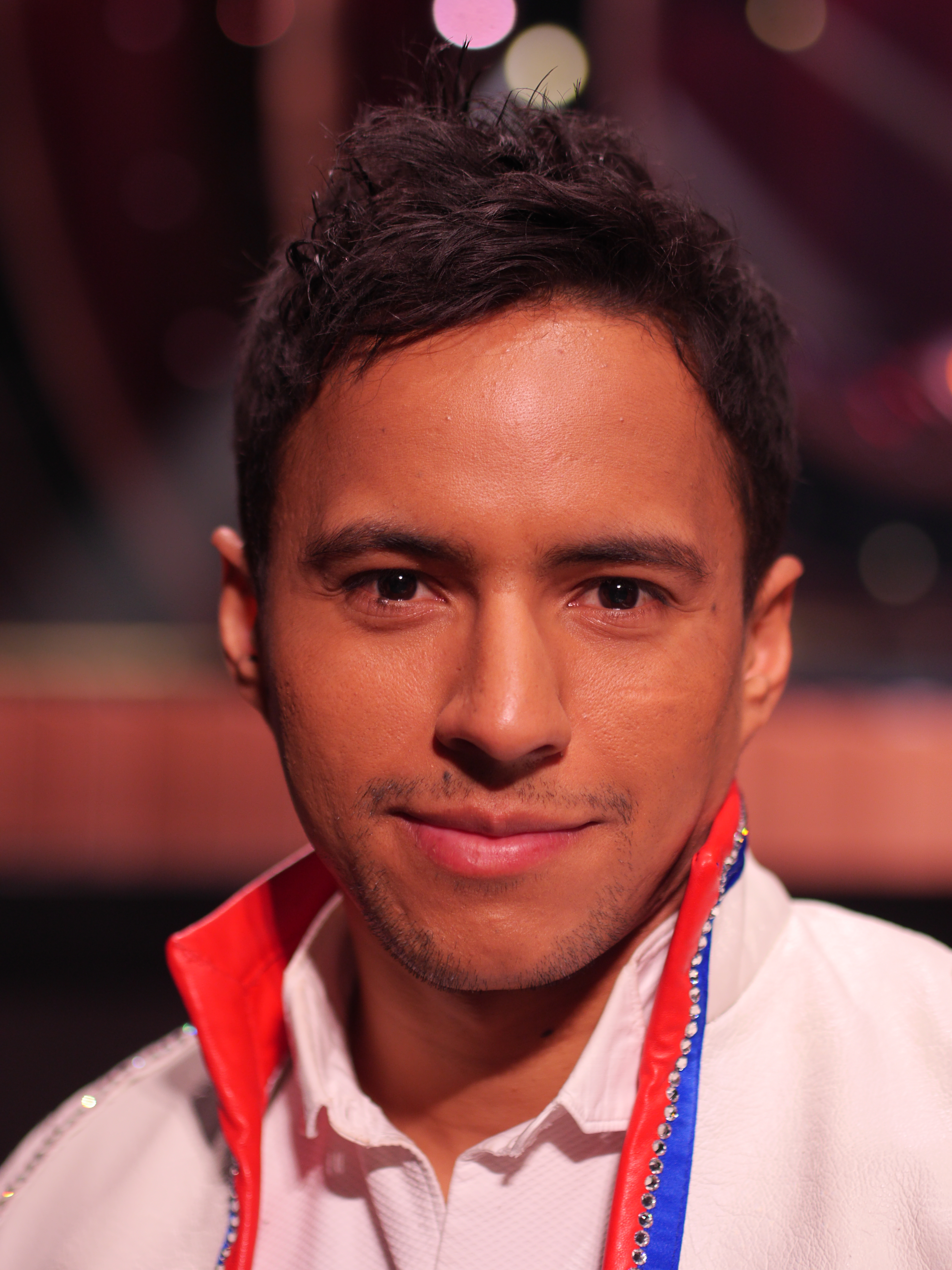
- Fjällgren in 2019

Background information
- Born: Jon Henrik Mario Fjällgren; 26 April 1987 (age 39); Cali, Colombia
- Origin: Mittådalen, Sweden
- Genres: Joik; pop; world; worldbeat
- Occupation: Singer
- Years active: 2014–present
- Website: www.jonhenrikfjallgren.se

Jon Henrik Mario Fjällgren (born 26 April 1987) is a Colombian-born Swedish-Sámi singer and jojkare, an interpreter of Sámi joik. He was the winner of Talang Sverige 2014, the Swedish version of Got Talent. Upon winning the competition he released the music album Goeksegh. He has participated in Melodifestivalen four times, in 2015 he placed second, in 2017 he placed third, and in 2019 and 2023 he placed fourth.

Fjällgren has been a member of the Sámi Parliament of Sweden since the 2021 election. He represents the political party Sámit.

== Biography ==
Fjällgren was born in Cali, Colombia. At a very young age, he lived in a Native Colombian village and later moved to an orphanage. Fjällgren later was adopted by a Swedish Sami family, and became part of a siida community in Mittådalen, a reindeer foraging area where he worked as a reindeer herder. Fjällgren has revealed in several interviews that he was bullied as a child because of his darker skin and Colombian ancestry. The bullying stopped as he reached teenaged years.

Fjällgren started singing local traditional songs when he was 14. He gained exposure when he sang in the presence of Carl XVI Gustaf and Queen Silvia who were attending church services at a church in Funäsdalen. When he was 16, he released an album titled Onne vielle.

== Career ==
At the age of 26, he took part in the Swedish Talang Sverige 2014 competition and won over viewers with his interpretations of traditional Sami songs. He auditioned with a rendition of "Daniel's Joik" dedicated to his best friend Daniel, who died from diabetes. After winning the competition and prize money of 1 million Swedish kronor, he released his studio album Goeksegh on 19 May 2014, based primarily on materials he had performed during the contest. According to a statement he gave in an interview on Colombian TV, he started a diabetes foundation with the prize money in honor of his deceased friend, Daniel.

On 31 May 2014, he performed at the "Saepmie Welcomes Festival" a festival of Sámi culture that coincided with the ConIFA World Football Cup held in Östersund. In July he performed his winning song in Allsång på Skansen which was broadcast on SVT.

Fjällgren participated in Melodifestivalen 2015 in the third semifinal with the song Jag är fri (Manne leam frijje), and made it to the final in Friends Arena. In the final he placed second after the jury and televoting results.

He participated again in Melodifestivalen 2017 with the song "En värld full av strider (Eatneme gusnie jeenh dåaroeh)" alongside Aninia on 25 February 2017, which coincided with the release of his second full album titled Aatjan goengere. He won Let's Dance 2018 broadcast on TV4. He participated in Melodifestivalen 2019 with the song "Norrsken".

His three songs: Daniel's Joik, Jag är fri (Manne leam frijje) and Norrsken, have all appeared in Stockholm/Åre's bid films to host the 2026 Olympic and Paralympic Winter Games.

== Awards ==
During the 2025 edition of the Sámi Grand Prix, Fjällgren received the Áillohaš Music Award, a Sámi music award conferred by Kautokeino Municipality and the Kautokeino Sámi Association to honor the significant contributions the recipient or recipients has made to the diverse world of Sámi music.

== Discography ==
=== Studio albums ===
Title	Details	Peak chart positions	Certifications
Title	Details	SWE	Certifications
Onne vielle (limited edition)	Released: 2005	—	
Goeksegh	Released: 19 May 2014; Label: Sony Music; Format: Digital download, CD	6	GLF: Gold
Goeksegh - Jag är fri	Released: 28 February 2015; Label: Sony Music; Format: Digital download, CD	1	GLF: Gold
Aatjan goengere	Released: 3 March 2017; Label: Sony Music; Format: Digital download, CD	15	

=== Singles ===
Title	Year	Peak chart positions	Certifications	Album
Title	Year	SWE	Certifications	Album
"Daniel's Joik"	2014	27	GLF: Platinum	Goeksegh
"Jag är fri (Manne leam frijje)"	2015	8	GLF: 2× Platinum	Goeksegh - Jag är fri
"En värld full av strider (Eatneme gusnie jeenh dåaroeh)" (with Aninia)	2017	12	GLF: Platinum	Aatjan goengere
"Norrsken"	2019	7		TBA
"The Avatar"	2020	—		TBA
"Where You Are (Sávežan)" (with Arc North & Adam Woods)	2023	6		TBA
"—" denotes a single that did not chart or was not released in that territory.

Awards and achievements
Preceded by Simon Westlund	Winner of Talang Sverige; 2014	Succeeded by Ibrahim Nasrullayeu
