= Paul Rey =

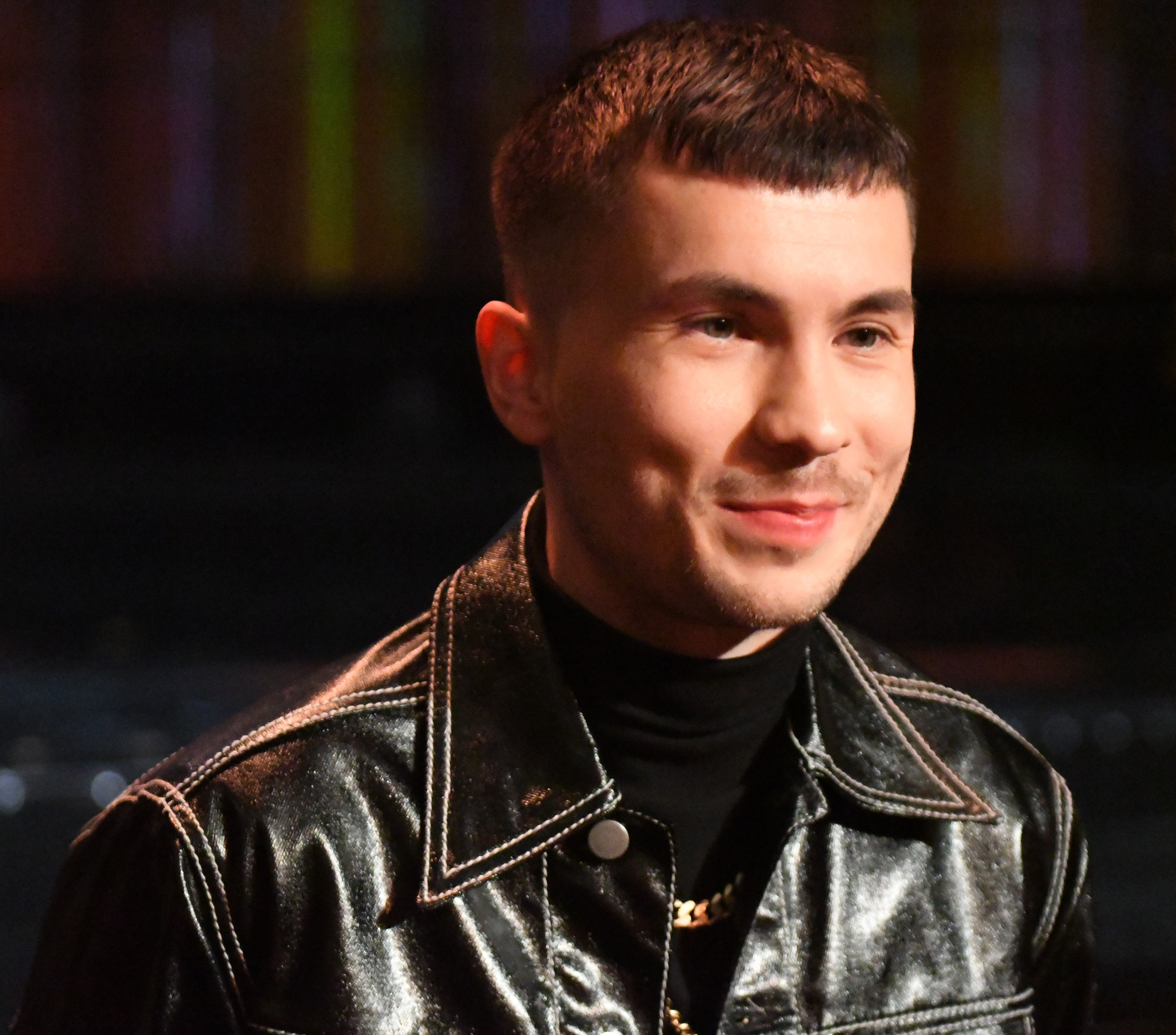

Background information
- Also known as: P.J.
- Born: Pauli Sebastian Jokela; 23 May 1992 (age 34); Lund, Sweden
- Genres: Pop; soul; R&B; Hip hop
- Occupations: Singer; songwriter; rapper
- Labels: Epic; 20/20
- Website: Official Facebook

Pauli Sebastian Jokela (born 23 May 1992), better known as Paul Rey, is a Swedish singer and songwriter. Rey started his musical career as a rapper, and made his debut as a pop singer in 2015, releasing his debut extended play, Good as Hell in the United States through Epic Records. He gained public attention when he participated in Melodifestivalen 2020 with his entry, "Talking in My Sleep" (2020), which earned him a sixth place. In 2021, he again took part in Melodifestivalen 2021 with "The Missing Piece".

== Early life ==
Paul Rey was born in Lund, his mother fled the Chilean dictatorship and started a new life in Paris in 1973, she came to Sweden as an exchange student. In Sweden she met Paul's father, who is Finnish and came to Sweden through an exchange program.

== Career ==
In 2015, Rey was signed to Epic Records in the United States and released his debut album "Good As Hell" the same year. Quincy Jones became his mentor soon after. In 2015, he also became an opening act during Fifth Harmony's tour. He also toured with Nico & Vinz.

In February 2017, he released the music single "California Dreaming" along with Arnan Cekin and Snoop Dogg. He also released the single "All Falls Down". In 2018, he released his album "Note to Self" which he produced himself.

Rey participated in Melodifestivalen 2020 with the song "Talking in My Sleep" and reached the finale, which took place on 7 March 2020. He ended up in sixth place, scoring a total of 68 points. He then participated in Melodifestivalen 2021 with the song "The Missing Piece" and qualified for the final through the Andra Chansen round. He ultimately placed last in the final with 25 points which took place on 13 March 2021. Rey returned to Melodifestivalen in 2023, where he placed seventh in the final with the song "Royals"; as of 2026, his public vote score of 1 point achieved that year remains the lowest recorded since the introduction of a proportional televote.

== Discography ==
=== Studio album ===
Title	Details
Makin' Moves (As P.J.)	Released: 31 August 2012; Label: Self-released; Format: Digital download

=== Extended plays ===
Title	Details	Peak chart positions
Title	Details	SWE
Good as Hell	Released: 21 August 2015; Label: Epic Records; Format: digital download	—
Note to Self	Released: 15 June 2018; Label: 20/20; Format: digital download	40
Note to Her	Released: 22 January 2021; Label: 20/20; Format: digital download	—
"—" denotes a recording that did not chart or was not released.

=== Singles ===
==== As lead artist ====
Title	Year	Peak chart positions	Certification	Album
Title	Year	SWE	Certification	Album
"All Falls Down"	2017	—		Non-album singles
"What Good Is Love"	2017	—		Non-album singles
"Soldier"	2018	—		Non-album singles
"Day by Day"	2018	—		Note to Self
"Company" (featuring Molly Hammar)	2018	—		Non-album singles
"Good for Me"	2019	—		Non-album singles
"Hurt"	2019	—		Non-album singles
"Talking in My Sleep"	2020	8	GLF: Platinum	Melodifestivalen 2020 and Note to Her
"Mistakes"	2020	—		Non-album single
"Richest Man Alive"	2020	—		Note to Her
"The Missing Piece"	2021	18		Melodifestivalen 2021
"Royals"	2023	23		Melodifestivalen 2023
"—" denotes a recording that did not chart or was not released.

==== As featured artist ====
Title	Year	Peak chart positions		Certifications	Album
Title	Year	SWE	FIN	Certifications	Album
"Bigger Than Us" (Dame D.O.L.L.A. featuring Paul Rey)	2015	—	—		Non-album singles
"Give It Away" (Penthox featuring Paul Rey)	2016	—	—		Non-album singles
"Take off" (Meric featuring Paul Rey)	2016	—	—		Non-album singles
"California Dreaming" (Arman Cekin featuring Snoop Dogg and Paul Rey)	2017	—	16	FIN: Platinum	Non-album singles
"Memory" (Chris Holsten featuring Paul Rey)	2020	—	—		Non-album singles
"—" denotes a recording that did not chart or was not released.

=== Other appearances ===
Title	Year	Album
"Gone Too Far" (S.T.I.C.S featuring P.J.)	2012	F.E.A.T.U.R.E.D
"Beyond the Pain" (S.T.I.C.S and Vince Kriss featuring P.J.)	2013	Bring the Blue Candy Back
"All That We Know" (By Any Means featuring P.J.)	2013	C'est Froid
"Play It Cool" (By Any Means featuring F.S, Matilda and P.J.)	2013	C'est Froid
