= Maria Sur =

Ukrainian singer (born 2004)

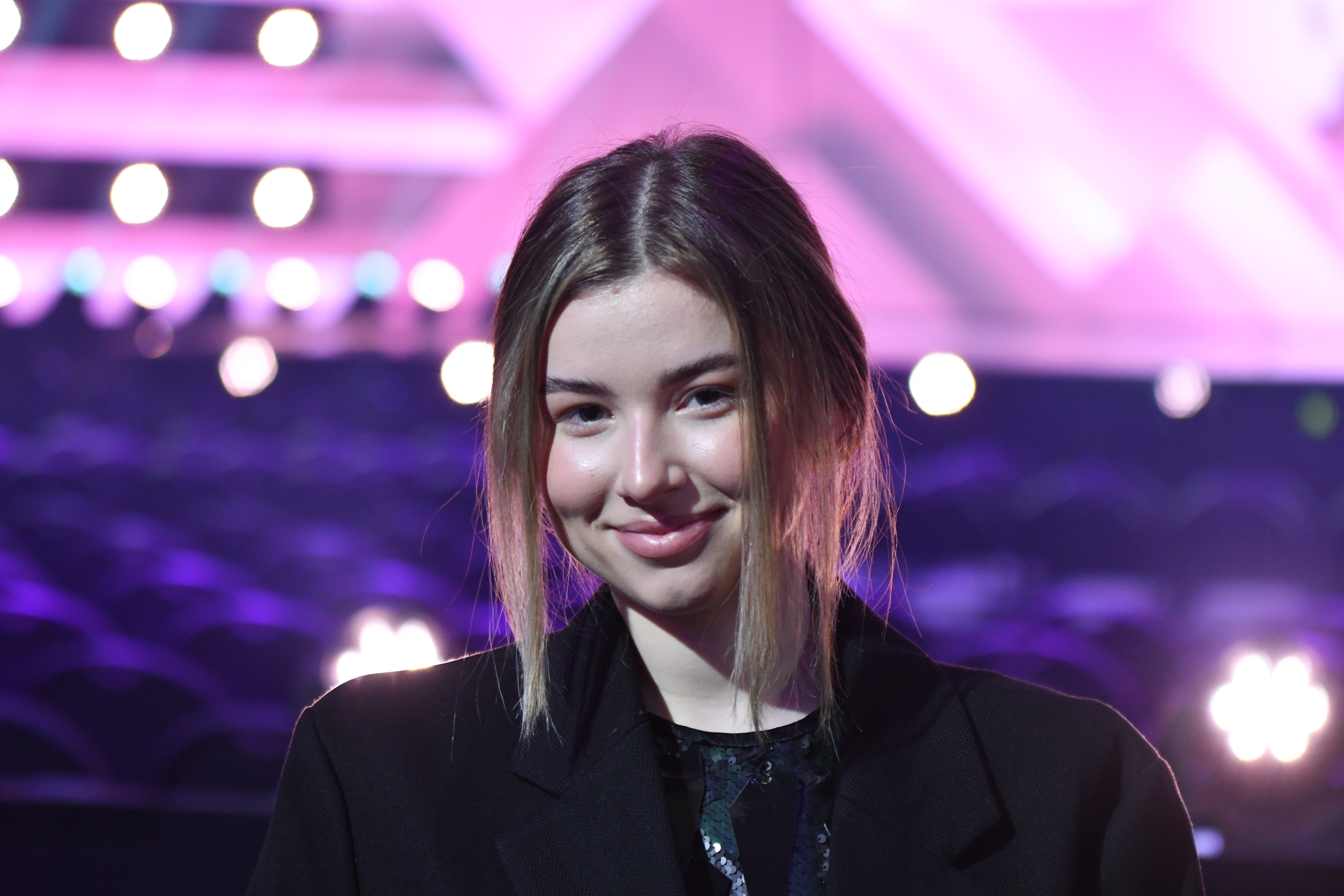
- Maria Sur in 2024

Background information
- Born: 31 December 2004 (age 21); Zaporizhzhia, Ukraine
- Occupation: Singer
- Years active: 2022–present
- Label: Warner Music Sweden

Maria Sur (Ukrainian: Марія Сур; born 31 December 2004) is a Ukrainian singer who lives and works in Sweden. She is best known for participating in Melodifestivalen 2023 with her song "Never Give Up" and Melodifestivalen 2024 with "When I'm Gone".

== Life and career ==
Maria Sur was born in Zaporizhzhia. In 2022, she participated in the twelfth season of Holos Krainy, the Ukrainian version of The Voice. Following the 2022 Russian invasion of Ukraine, Sur and her mother fled Ukraine, and settled in Sweden. Sur soon came into contact with singer Sarah Dawn Finer, which led to Sur getting to perform at a charity gala in solidarity with Ukraine, in Avicii Arena, Stockholm, where she performed the Destiny's Child song "Survivor". She later signed a record deal with Warner Music Sweden.

Sur participated in Melodifestivalen 2023 with the song "Never Give Up", finishing ninth in the final. During the summer of 2023, Sur participated in the Diggiloo tour around Sweden. She took part in Melodifestivalen 2024 with "When I'm Gone"; she came second in her semi-final on 10 February 2024, qualifying directly to the final. She finished seventh in the final, with 37 points from the juries and 35 points from the televote, totalling 72 points.

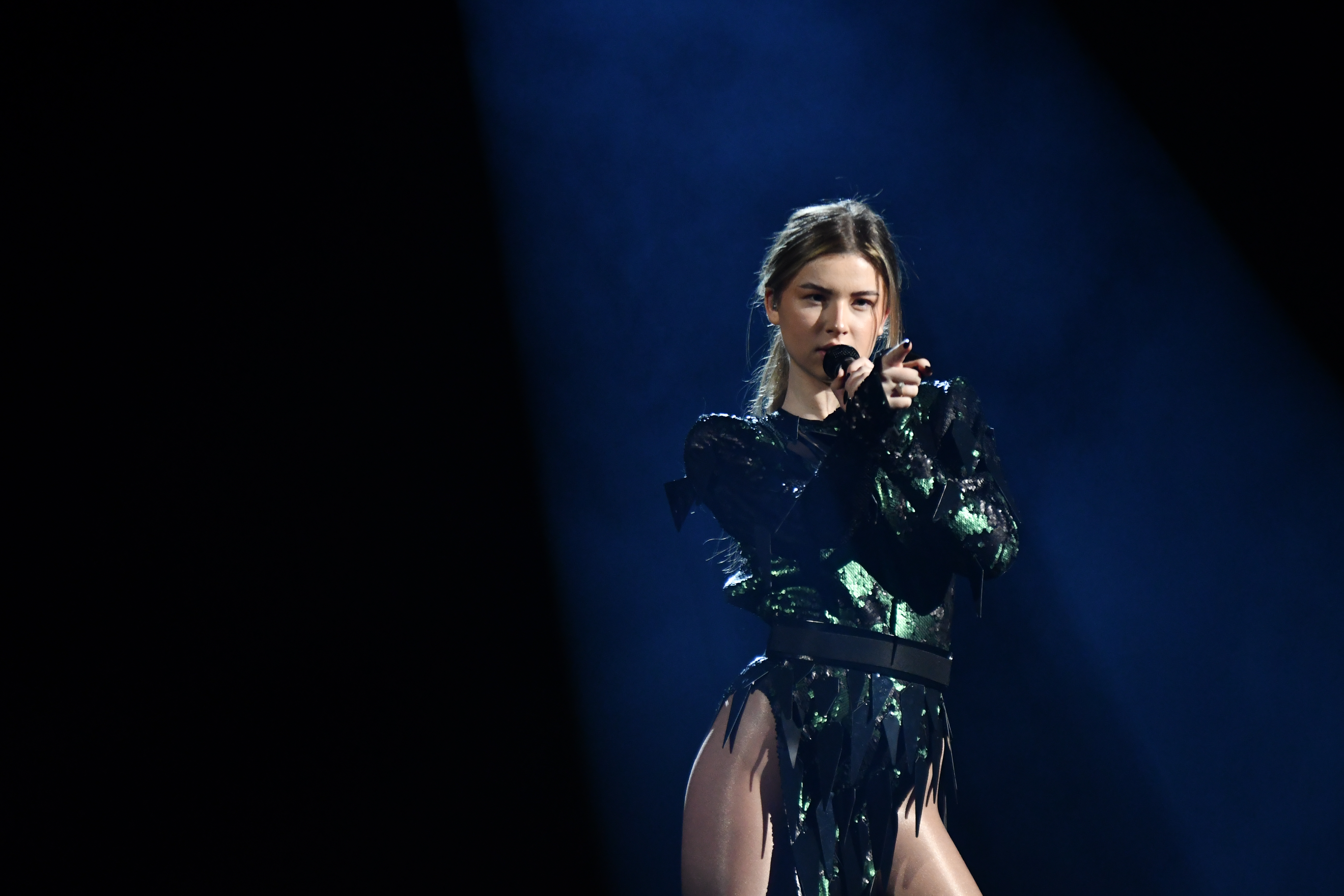
Maria Sur performing "When I'm Gone" in Melodifestivalen 2024

== Discography ==
=== Singles ===
List of singles
Title	Year	Peak chart positions	Album
Title	Year	SWE	Album
"Never Give Up"	2023	17	Non-album singles
"When I'm Gone"	2024	12	Non-album singles
