= Arc North =

Swedish DJ and music producer

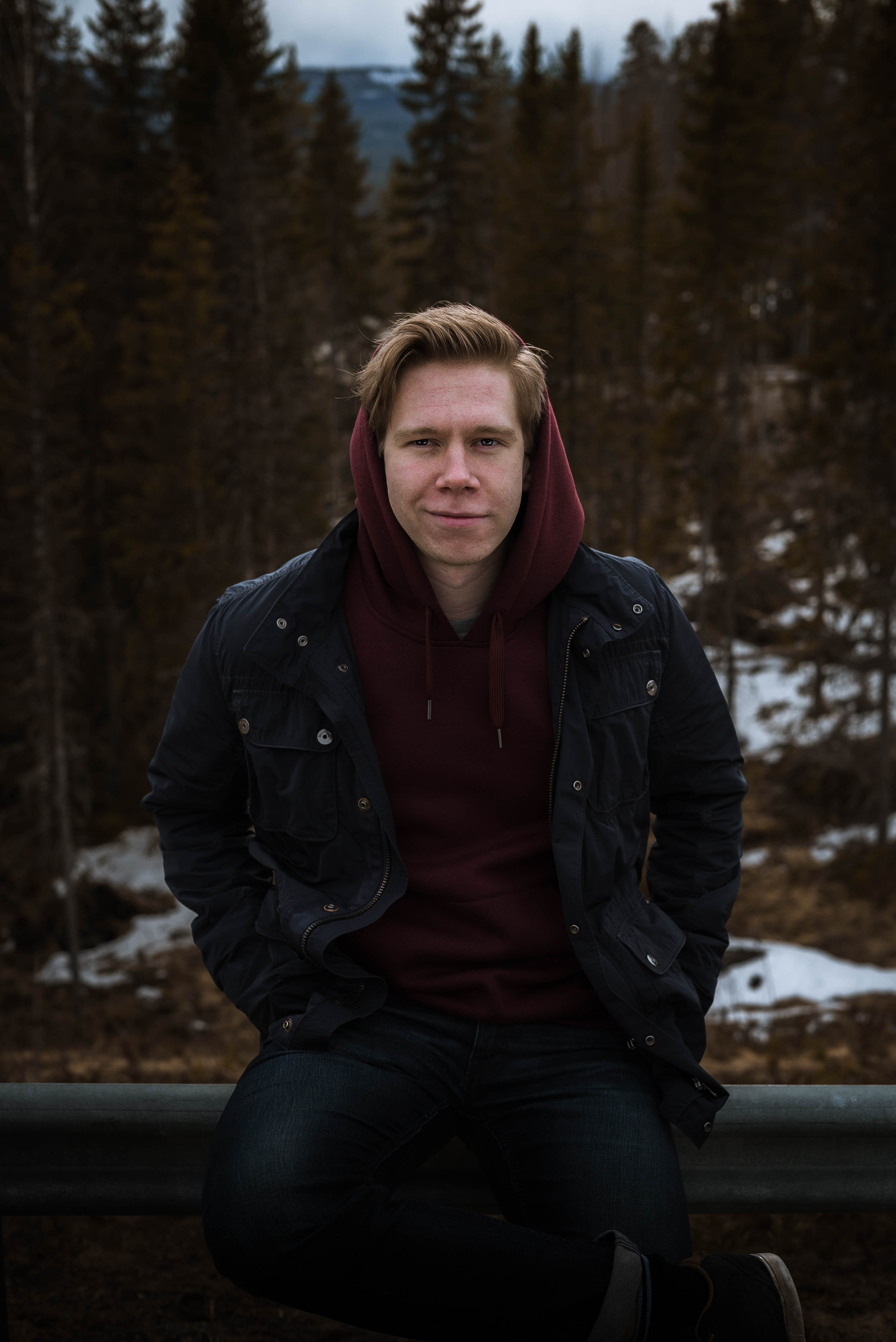
- Arc North in 2020

Background information
- Born: 1 June 1997 (age 28); Stockholm, Sweden

Oscar Jan Bengt Christiansson, professionally known as Arc North, (born 1 June, 1997) is a Swedish DJ and music producer. He participated in Melodifestivalen 2023 with the song "Where You Are (Sávežan)" along with Jon Henrik Fjällgren and Adam Woods.

== Discography ==
=== Extended Plays ===
As main artist
Title	Year	Details
"Where You Are (Sávežan) [feat. Adam Woods] [Alex D'Rosso Remix] (Arc North, Jon Henrik Fjällgren, Adam Woods, Alex D'Rosso)	2023	Label: LoudKult
"No Cow On The Ice" (Arc North)	2020	Label: AntiFragile Music
"Love Me To Life'" (Arc North, AXYL)	2020	Self-release
"Limbo (Remixes)" (Arc North, Veronica Bravo)	2020	Label: Magic Records

=== Singles ===
As main artist
Title	Year	Peak chart positions	Album
Title	Year	SWE	Album
"Where You Are (Sávežan) [Acoustic Version] (Arc North, Jon Henrik Fjällgren, Adam Woods)	2023		Non-album single
"Where You Are (Sávežan)" (Arc North, Jon Henrik Fjällgren, Adam Woods)	2023	6	Non-album single
"Better" (Arc North, Rival, Cadmium)	2022		Non-album single
"Better Life (°AN Sessions Vol.1) (Arc North, Reo Cragun)	2022		Non-album single
"Broken Roads" (Arc North, Rival, The Music Freaks, MIYA MIYA)	2022		Non-album single
"Knight Rider" (Alfons, Arc North)	2022		Non-album single
"Enemy" (Arc North, Meric Again, Fallen Roses)	2022		Non-album single
"Regrets" (Arc North, Axel Johansson)	2022		Non-album single
"I Know" (Arc North, Shiah Maisel)	2022		Non-album single
"Coming Home" (Arc North, Rival, Cadmium)	2021		Non-album single
"Go Home" (Arc North)	2021		Non-album single
"Symphony" (Arc North, Donna Tella)	2021		Non-album single
"Wildfire" (Arc North, LILO, Rynn)	2021		Non-album single
"Numb (Acoustic)" (AXA, Arc North, Pop Mage)	2021		Non-album single
"Save The World" (Arc North, CRVN)	2021		Non-album single
"We're Beautiful" (Arc North, Nicole Bullet, Sharmystic)	2021		Non-album single
"Like Me But Better" (Arc North, Next to Neon)	2021		Non-album single
"Let Me Love You" (Arc North, Jacob Frohde)	2021		Non-album single
"Close To Lonely" (Arc North, Bertie Scott)	2021		Non-album single
"Youngblood" (Arc North, Cour, Charlie Miller)	2021		Non-album single
"Love You Like a Love Song" (Behmer, Arc North, Cour)	2021		Non-album single
"What You Want" (Arc North)	2021		Non-album single
"Loved With Your Love" (Arc North, Rival, Robbie Rosen)	2020		Non-album single
"Faded" (Arc North, Cour, New Beat Order, Lunis)	2020		Non-album single
"Stronger" (Arc North, Shaunt.wav)	2020		Non-album single
"Numb" (Arc North, Aaron Richards, New Beat Order, Cour)	2020		Non-album single
"Back To Life" (Arc North, Elle Vee)	2020		Non-album single
"Down" (Arc North, Badjack, Cour)	2020		Non-album single
"Back To You" (Arc North, JANNA)	2020		No Cow On The Ice
"You're Always With Me" (Arc North) Directed by Alasdair Braxton	2019		No Cow On The Ice
"If You Would Let Me" (Arc North, HANDS)	2019		No Cow On The Ice
"Limbo" (Arc North, Veronica Bravo)	2019		Non-album single
"Sweet Sunshine" (Arc North)	2019		Non-album single
"Catch Me When I Fall" (Arc North, Sarah de Warren)	2019		Non-album single
"End of Time" (Arc North, Laura Brehm, Rival)	2018		Non-album single
"Together Now" (Arc North, Camilla Neideman, Polarbearz)	2018		Non-album single
"Raging" (Arc North)	2018		Non-album single
"My Love" (Arc North, Jonört)	2018		Non-album single
"Darkside" (Arc North, Agiya)	2017		Non-album single
"Onward, Pt.2" (Arc North, Dani Rosenoer)	2017		Non-album single
"Short Story" (Rival, Arc North)	2017		Non-album single
"Never Gonna" (Arc North)	2016		Non-album single
"Meant To Be" (Arc North, Krista Marina) Directed by Alasdair Braxton	2016		Non-album single
"Digital Happiness" (Arc North)	2016		Non-album single
"Short Story" (Arc North, DJ Rival)	2016		Non-album single
"Dusk" (Arc North)	2016		Non-album single
"Daylight" (Arc North)	2016		Non-album single
"Slash" (Arc North)	2016		Non-album single
"Dark Space" (Arc North, Miza)	2016		Non-album single
"Neptune" (Arc North)	2016		Non-album single
"Voltage" (Arc North)	2016		Non-album single
"First Light" (Arc North)	2016		Non-album single
"Passion" (Arc North)	2016		Non-album single
"Lost Time" (Arc North)	2016		Non-album single
"Heroic" (Arc North)	2016		Non-album single
"Tomahawk" (Arc North)	2016		Non-album single
"Morocco" (Arc North)	2016		Non-album single
"Vice" (Arc North)	2016		Non-album single
"Oceanside" (Arc North)	2015		Non-album single
