= Talking in My Sleep =

Single by Paul Rey
- Released: 7 February 2020
- Length: 2:58
- Label: 20/20; Warner Music Sweden
- Songwriters: Lukas Hällgren; Alexander Standal Pavelich; Paul Rey
- Producer: Lukas Hällgren

Paul Rey singles chronology
"Hurt" (2019)	"Talking in My Sleep" (2020)	"Mistakes" (2020)

Music video
- "Talking in My Sleep" on YouTube

"Talking in My Sleep" is a song by Swedish singer Paul Rey. The song was first performed at Melodifestivalen 2020, where it advanced to the final through the Second Chance round. The song ultimately ranked sixth, accumulating a total of 68 points.

== Track listing ==
Digital download
No.	Title	Length
1.	"Talking in My Sleep"	2:59

Acoustic version
No.	Title	Length
1.	"Talking in My Sleep" (Acoustic Version)	3:18

== Charts ==
=== Weekly charts ===
Chart (2020)	Peak position
Sweden (Sverigetopplistan)	8

=== Year-end charts ===
Chart (2020)	Position
Sweden (Sverigetopplistan)	53

== Certifications ==
Region	Certification	Certified units/sales
Sweden (GLF)	Platinum	8,000,000^{†}
^{†} Streaming-only figures based on certification alone.
